= All-time rosters by defunct NFL franchises (Cleveland Tigers/Indians–Miami Seahawks) =

This is a list of players who have appeared in at least one regular season or postseason game for defunct National Football League (NFL) or All-America Football Conference (AAFC) franchises. This list contains franchises sorted alphabetically from "Detroit Heralds" to "Muncie Flyers". For the rest of the franchises, see all-time rosters by defunct NFL franchises (Akron Indians/Pros–Cleveland Indians/Bulldogs) and (Milwaukee Badgers–Washington Senators).

== Cleveland Tigers/Indians ==
- Bert Baston
- Harry Baujan
- J. Philip Bower
- Ed Brawley
- George Brickley
- Jim Bryant
- Pete Calac
- Stan Cofall
- Tuffy Conn
- Bunny Corcoran
- Carl Cramer
- Mark Devlin
- Dinger Doane
- Moon Ducote
- Milt Ghee
- Johnny Gilroy
- Tom Gormley
- Joe Guyon
- Bruno Haas
- Doc Haggerty
- Andy Hastings
- Johnny Hendren
- Pat Herron
- George Kerr
- Bull Lowe
- Phil Marshall
- Joe Mattern
- Moore
- Joe Murphy
- Dan O'Connor
- Ed O'Hearn
- Jack O'Hearn
- Patterson
- Red Pearlman
- Leo Petree
- Al Pierotti
- Frank Rydzewski
- Herb Sies
- Butch Spagna
- Jake Stahl
- George Tandy
- Tiny Thornhill
- Jim Thorpe
- Ray Trowbridge
- Ralph Waldsmith
- Al Wesbecher
- Tom Whelan

== Cleveland Indians (1931) ==
- Chuck Braidwood
- Algy Clark
- Al Cornsweet
- Hank Critchfield
- David Cullen
- Fred Danziger
- Doc Elliott
- Mike Gregory
- Hoot Herrin
- John Hurley
- Merle Hutson
- Leo Jensvold
- Ernie Jessen
- Al Jolley
- Red Joseph
- Howie Kriss
- Buck Lamme
- Biff Lee
- Franklin Lewis
- Tiny Lewis
- Babe Lyon
- Stu MacMillan
- Dave Mishel
- George Munday
- Al Nesser
- Ray Novotny
- Carl Pignatelli
- Don Ridler
- Jim Tarr
- Otto Vokaty
- Dale Waters
- Chuck Weimer
- Drip Wilson
- Hoge Workman

== Columbus Panhandles/Tigers ==
- Dom Albanese
- Burl Atcheson
- Pete Barnum
- John Beckett
- John Beckwith
- Bill Berrehsem
- Jim Bertoglio
- Harry Bliss
- Elliott Bonowitz
- Hi Brigham
- Gale Bullman
- Chuck Carney
- Gene Carroll
- John Conley
- Doc Davis
- Herb Davis
- John Davis
- Earl Duvall
- Ray Eichenlaub
- Walt Ellis
- Charlie Essman
- Jim Flower
- Hal Gaulke
- Morris Glassman
- Paul G. Goebel
- Angus Goetz
- Flop Gorrill
- Andy Gump
- Neil Halleck
- Ray Hanson
- Jack Heldt
- Ted Hopkins
- Babe Houck
- Wilmer Isabel
- Len Johnson
- Bob Karch
- Earl Krieger
- Oscar Kuhner
- John Layport
- Frank Lone Star
- Tom Long
- Paul Lynch
- Joe Mantell
- Wilkie Moody
- Joe Mulbarger
- Tommy Murphy
- Ted Murtha
- Andy Nemecek
- Charlie Nesser
- Frank Nesser
- Fred Nesser
- John Nesser
- Phil Nesser
- Ted Nesser
- Ike Nonnemaker
- Bill Passuelo
- Dwight Peabody
- Harley Pearce
- Boni Petcoff
- Earl Plank
- Harry Randolph
- Bob Rapp
- Jim Regan
- Lou Reichel
- Walt Rogers
- George Rohleder
- Emmett Ruh
- Homer Ruh
- Jack Sack
- Herb Schell
- John Schneider
- Pete Schultz
- Al Shook
- Lee Snoots
- Gus Sonnenberg
- Mark Stevenson
- Gaylord Stinchcomb
- Herb Stock
- Gus Tebell
- Buddy Tynes
- Will Waite
- Red Weaver
- Sonny Winters
- Don Wiper
- Oscar Wolford
- Flash Woods
- Howard Yerges
- Paul Ziegler

== Dallas Texans (NFL) ==
- Ben Aldridge
- Sisto Averno
- Billy Baggett
- Joe Campanella
- Pat Cannamela
- Bob Celeri
- Don Colo
- Jerry Davis
- Art Donovan
- Brad Ecklund
- Dan Edwards
- Gene Felker
- Keith Flowers
- Sonny Gandee
- Chubby Grigg
- Dick Hoerner
- Weldon Humble
- Ken Jackson
- Keever Jankovich
- Tom Keane
- Jim Lansford
- Hank Lauricella
- Gino Marchetti
- Dick McKissack
- Chuck Ortmann
- Ray Pelfrey
- John Petitbon
- Barney Poole
- Joe Reid
- George Robison
- Will Sherman
- Joe Soboleski
- Art Tait
- George Taliaferro
- Hamp Tanner
- Zollie Toth
- Frank Tripucka
- Dick Wilkins
- Stan Williams
- John Wozniak
- Buddy Young

== Dayton Triangles ==
- Faye Abbott
- Dick Abrell
- Sneeze Achiu
- Frank Bacon
- John Beasley
- Johnnie Becker
- Art Beckley
- Bill Belanich
- Bobby Berns
- Elliott Bonowitz
- John Brewer
- Earl Britton
- Max Broadhurst
- Jack Brown
- Steve Buchanan
- Earl Burgner
- Augie Cabrinha
- Eric Calhoun
- Roy Carlson
- Win Charles
- Bill Clark
- Clair Cook
- Ken Crawford
- Harry Cutler
- Doc Davis
- Larry Dellinger
- John Depner
- Ebby DeWeese
- Dick Dobeleit
- Clarence Drayer
- Pat Duffy
- Guy Early
- Dick Egan
- Dick Faust
- Harold Fenner
- Lee Fenner
- John Gabler
- Al Graham
- Clarence Graham
- Charlie Guy
- Bob Haas
- Bruno Haas
- Art Haley
- Russ Hathaway
- Earl Hauser
- Chuck Helvie
- Sam Hipa
- Ken Huffine
- Mack Hummon
- Al Jolley
- Red Joseph
- Zip Joseph
- John Kauffman
- Jackson Keefer
- George Kinderdine
- Shine Kinderdine
- Walt Kinderdine
- Bill Knecht
- Waddy Kuehl
- John Layport
- Pesky Lentz
- Al Mahrt
- Armin Mahrt
- Johnny Mahrt
- Lou Mahrt
- Carl Mankat
- Arthur Matsu
- Gene Mayl
- John Miller
- Wilkie Moody
- Stan Muirhead
- Tip O'Neill
- Lou Partlow
- Gus Redman
- Dave Reese
- Peck Reiter
- George Roudebush
- Nelson Rupp
- Norb Sacksteder
- Archie Sampson
- Ed Sauer
- Ed Seibert
- Herb Sies
- Frank Sillin
- John Singleton
- Fritz Slackford
- Jim Spencer
- Jake Stahl
- Earl Stoecklein
- Aubrey Strosnider
- Jimmy Tays
- Dutch Thiele
- Glenn Tidd
- Ed Tolley
- Chalmers Tschappat
- Tiny Turner
- Jiggs Ullery
- Tillie Voss
- John Wallace
- Inky Williams
- Charlie Winston
- Elmer Wynne
- Russ Young
- Corl Zimmerman

== Detroit Heralds ==
- Lynn Allen
- Clarence Applegran
- Chris Bentz
- Charlie Carman
- Tom Dickinson
- Earl Dunn
- Russ Finsterwald
- Joe Fitzgerald
- Moose Gardner
- Gates
- Charlie Guy
- Bo Hanley
- Steamer Horning
- Stan Jacobs
- Marshall Jones
- Bill Joyce
- Jimmy Kelly
- King
- Ty Krentler
- Alvin Loucks
- Hugh Lowery
- Birtie Maher
- McCoy
- Blake Miller
- Eddie Moegle
- Gil Runkel
- Heine Schultz
- Don Straw
- Ernest Watson
- Ray Whipple
- Perce Wilson
- Wood

== Detroit Panthers ==
- John Barrett
- Bill Bucher
- John Cameron
- Jimmy Conzelman
- Al Crook
- Dinger Doane
- Tom Edwards
- Walt Ellis
- Jack Fleischman
- Bruce Gregory
- Charles Grube
- Al Hadden
- Norm Harvey
- Tom Hogan
- Vivian Hultman
- Dutch Lauer
- Eddie Lynch
- Dutch Marion
- McDonald
- Tom McNamara
- Eddie Scharer
- Russ Smith
- Gus Sonnenberg
- Dick Vick
- Ernie Vick
- Tillie Voss
- Byron Wimberly

== Detroit Tigers ==
- Butch Brandau
- Charlie Carman
- Walt Clago
- Frank Coughlin
- Neno DaPrato
- Cy DeGree
- Earl Dunn
- Moose Gardner
- Buck Gavin
- Charlie Guy
- Steamer Horning
- Earl Krieger
- Waddy Kuehl
- Blake Miller
- Eddie Moegle
- Norb Sacksteder
- Bill Stobbs
- Don Straw
- Tillie Voss
- Vic Whitmarsh
- Pryor Williams

== Detroit Wolverines ==
- Carl Bacchus
- Rip Bachor
- John Barrett
- Les Caywood
- Tom Cobb
- Tiny Feather
- Benny Friedman
- Dosey Howard
- Pete Jackson
- Lyle Munn
- Bill Owen
- Proc Randels
- Eddie Scharer
- Len Sedbrook
- Rex Thomas
- Ernie Vick
- Ossie Wiberg
- Chet Widerquist
- Joe Wostoupal

== Duluth Kelleys/Eskimos ==
- Roger Ashmore
- Bunny Belden
- Charlie Black
- Eddie Bratt
- Walt Buland
- Oke Carlson
- Pots Clark
- Herbert Clow
- Fritz Cronin
- Fred Denfeld
- Roddy Dunn
- Art Engstrom
- Paul Fitzgibbon
- Chuck Gayer
- Wally Gilbert
- Ira Haaven
- Ken Harris
- Fritz Heinisch
- Art Johnson
- Doc Kelley
- Howard Kieley
- Walt Kiesling
- Mike Koziak
- Chick Lang
- Louie Larson
- Allen MacDonald
- Mickey MacDonnell
- John Madigan
- Jimmy Manion
- Bobby Marshall
- Jack McCarthy
- Johnny "Blood" McNally
- Bill McNellis
- Russ Method
- Red Morse
- Jim Murphy
- Jock Murray
- Clem Neacy
- Ernie Nevers
- Dick O'Donnell
- Wally O'Neill
- Bill O'Toole
- Red Quam
- Bill Rooney
- Cobb Rooney
- Joe Rooney
- Porky Rundquist
- Jim Sanford
- Dewey Scanlon
- Shanley
- Bill Stein
- Joey Sternaman
- Leif Strand
- Ray Suess
- Hew Sullivan
- Rex Tobin
- Jack Underwood
- Roy Vexall
- Doc Williams

== Evansville Crimson Giants ==
- Bourbon Bondurant
- Slats Dalrymple
- Winnie Denton
- Vic Endress
- Frank Fausch
- Alec Fishman
- Louie Fritsch
- Bill Garnjost
- Earl Goldsmith
- Doc Gorman
- Herb Henderson
- Mark Ingle
- Red Jackson
- Tiny Ladson
- Pete Lauer
- Vince Lensing
- Menz Lindsey
- John McDonald
- Chief Mullen
- Chuck O'Neil
- Jess Reno
- Tubby Rohsenberger
- Spencer Rork
- Joe Sanders
- Frank J. Skinner
- Lew Skinner
- Bill Slyker
- Dick Spain
- Clarence Spiegel
- Steve Sullivan
- Earl Warweg
- Pete Wathen
- Walker Whitehead
- Travis Williams
- Joe Windbiel
- Leon Winternheimer
- Jerry Zeller

== Frankford Yellow Jackets ==
- Marger Apsit
- George Barna
- Nate Barragar
- Al Bedner
- Bull Behman
- Eddie Bollinger
- Bob Books
- Earl Britton
- Doc Bruder
- Justin Brumbaugh
- Johnny Budd
- Stanley Burnham
- Bill Capps
- Joe Carpe
- Charlie Carton
- Guy Chamberlin
- Pots Clark
- Alex Clement
- Rudy Comstock
- Harry Connaughton
- Chris Cortemeglia
- Clyde Crabtree
- Clark Craig
- Rae Crowther
- Saville Crowther
- Russell Daugherity
- Carl Davis
- Harry Dayhoff
- Wally Diehl
- Emil Dobry
- Bill Donohoe
- Leo Douglass
- Eddie Doyle
- Jug Earp
- Chief Elkins
- Jack Ernst
- John Filak
- Jack Finn
- Paul Fitzgibbon
- Paul Fitzke
- Bill Fleckenstein
- Adrian Ford
- George Gibson
- Royce Goodbread
- Fred Graham
- Tex Grigg
- Mike Gulian
- Ed Halicki
- Tex Hamer
- Hal Hanson
- Art Harms
- Charlie Havens
- Les Haws
- Bill Hoffman
- Paul Hogan
- Two-Bits Homan
- Jack Hutton
- Ted James
- Rob Jamieson
- Herb Joesting
- Ben Jones
- Potsy Jones
- Mort Kaer
- Chuck Kassel
- Jake Kaufman
- Bill Kellogg
- Bill Kelly
- Art Koeninger
- Marty Kostos
- Tony Kostos
- Tom Leary
- Walt LeJeune
- Harvey Long
- Bull Lowe
- Jerry Lunz
- Link Lyman
- Mickey MacDonnell
- Al Maglisceau
- James Magner
- Walter Mahan
- Roger Mahoney
- Harry Malcolm
- Cliff Marker
- Joey Maxwell
- Jack McArthur
- Elmer McCormick
- Frank McGrath
- Ken Mercer
- Warner Mizell
- Lou Molinet
- Sully Montgomery
- Hap Moran
- Dick Moynihan
- Mally Nydall
- Milt O'Connell
- Arnie Oehlrich
- Tony Panaccion
- Jim Pederson
- Art Pharmer
- Daddy Potts
- Ken Provencial
- Frank Racis
- Max Reed
- Neil Rengel
- Pete Richards
- Ray Richards
- Carroll Ringwalt
- Wooky Roberts
- Kelly Rodriguez
- Johnny Roepke
- Charley Rogers
- Herman Seborg
- Walt Sechrist
- Red Seidelson
- Johnny Shultz
- Gene Smith
- Lou Smyth
- Butch Spagna
- Bill Springsteen
- Herb Stein
- Russ Stein
- Tony Steponovich
- Hust Stockton
- Jack Storer
- George Sullivan
- Cookie Tackwell
- Bob Tanner
- Whitey Thomas
- Johnny Thompson
- George Tully
- Clyde Van Sickle
- Carl Waite
- Eddie Wall
- Johnny Ward
- Gordon Watkins
- Charley Way
- Ed Weir
- Joe Weir
- Bub Weller
- Jim Welsh
- Ned Wilcox
- Frank Wilsbach
- George Wilson
- Lee Wilson
- Ab Wright
- Swede Youngstrom

== Hammond Pros ==
- Anderson
- Dunc Annan
- Mose Bashaw
- Gene Bedford
- George Berry
- Teddy Besta
- Brunswick
- Lyle Burton
- Sol Butler
- Ed Carman
- Charley Carr
- Tony Catalano
- Lloyd Cearing
- Ralph Chase
- Ken Crawford
- Harry Curzon
- George Dahlgren
- Edward Davis
- Jack Depler
- Ben Derr
- John Detwiler
- Wop Drumstead
- Guil Falcon
- George Fisher
- William Fortune
- Buck Gavin
- Bill Giaver
- Hank Gillo
- Ray Hahn
- Carl Hanke
- George Hartong
- Wilbur Henderson
- Wally Hess
- Max Hicks
- Dick Hudson
- Merle Hunter
- Red Jackson
- Carroll Johnson
- Marshall Jones
- Ralph Jones
- Jim Kendrick
- Dick King
- Rip King
- Oscar Knop
- Dutch Kohl
- Louis Kolls
- Bill Kovacsy
- Tony LaBissoniere
- Swede Larson
- Paul Leatherman
- Herbert Magida
- Glen Magnusson
- Mathewson
- Charlie Mathys
- McDonald
- Jack McKetes
- Ward Meese
- Klinks Meyers
- Frank Moran
- Ray Neal
- Don Nelson
- Obie Newman
- Russ Oltz
- Joe Pliska
- Fritz Pollard
- Rice
- Elliott Risley
- Mace Roberts
- Ed Robinson
- Frank Rydzewski
- Lenny Sachs
- Walt Sechrist
- Ed Seibert
- Frank Seliger
- Si Seyfrit
- John Shelburne
- Bill Singleton
- Lew Skinner
- Russ Smith
- Wilfred Smith
- Robert Specht
- Dick Stahlman
- Steve Sullivan
- Jim Talbott
- Dave Tallant
- Festus Tierney
- Tommy Tomlin
- Rube Ursella
- Lou Usher
- Walter Voight
- Ward
- Warren
- Rat Watson
- Hal Wendler
- Willert
- Inky Williams

== Hartford Blues ==
- Eddie Barnikow
- Jack Bonadies
- Harry Brian
- Chuck Corgan
- Dilly Dally
- Jim Donlin
- Furlong Flynn
- Jim Foley
- Jake Friedman
- Art Garvey
- Dennis Gildea
- Dimp Halloran
- John Harris
- Lefty Jamerson
- Ed Keenan
- Eddie Lynch
- Jim Manning
- Ernie McCann
- Elmer McCormick
- Ed McEvoy
- Harry McMahon
- Ralph Nichols
- Dick Noble
- Grat O'Connell
- Frank O'Connor
- Red O'Neil
- John Perrin
- Vic Radzievitch
- Joe Santone
- Rocky Segretta
- Stan Sieracki
- Ken Simendinger
- Lou Smyth
- Enid Thomas
- Dutch Webber
- Mule Werwaiss
- Henry Zehrer

== Kansas City Blues/Cowboys ==
- LeRoy Andrews
- Bill Ashbaugh
- Henry Bassett
- Joy Berquist
- Al Bloodgood
- Jim Bradshaw
- Obie Bristow
- Bob Choate
- Tom Cobb
- Chuck Corgan
- Rufe DeWitz
- Joe Guyon
- Charley Hill
- Cowboy Hill
- Dosey Howard
- Swede Hummell
- Jim Jacquith
- Al Krueger
- Lew Lane
- Emmett McLemore
- Joe Milam
- Johnny Milton
- Jack Mintun
- Lyle Munn
- Tommy Murphy
- Bill Owen
- Steve Owen
- Jim Palermo
- Carl Peterson
- Ivan Quinn
- Proc Randels
- Milt Rehnquist
- Dick Sears
- Clyde Smith
- Glen Spear
- Dick Stahlman
- Dutch Strauss
- Steve Sullivan
- Alvie Thompson
- Eddie Usher
- Rat Watson
- Dutch Webber
- Phil White
- Bud Widick
- Joe Wostoupal

== Kenosha Maroons ==
- Jimmy Baxter
- Irv Carlson
- Walt Cassidy
- Marty Conrad
- George Dahlgren
- Dick Egan
- Swede Erickson
- Earl Gorman
- Fritz Heinisch
- Bill Hurst
- Ray Oberbroekling
- Clete Patterson
- Pard Pearce
- Earl Potteiger
- George Seasholtz
- Jimmy Simpson
- Dick Stahlman
- Lou Usher
- Dick Vick
- Whitey Wolter
- Marv Wood

== Los Angeles Buccaneers ==
- Juddy Ash
- Ben Bangs
- Fred Beach
- Bull Finch
- Bill Gutteron
- Del Hufford
- Tut Imlay
- Tuffy Maul
- Jack McArthur
- Harold Muller
- Don Newmeyer
- John Nolan
- Artie Sandberg
- Pete Schaffnit
- Don Thompson
- John Thurman
- Ellery White
- Al Young

== Los Angeles Dons ==
- Ben Agajanian
- Alex Agase
- Joe Aguirre
- Sugarfoot Anderson
- Lee Artoe
- Earl Audet
- Don Avery
- Burr Baldwin
- Pete Berezney
- Angelo Bertelli
- John Brown
- Harry Clarke
- Walt Clay
- Paul Crowe
- Dick Danehe
- Harper Davis
- Glenn Dobbs
- Bob Dobelstein
- John Donaldson
- Gil Duggan
- Jeff Durkota
- Dan Dworsky
- Earl Elsey
- Chuck Fenenbock
- Bill Fisk
- Jack Flagerman
- Oliver Fletcher
- Len Ford
- Ray Frankowski
- Bernie Gallagher
- Dale Gentry
- Mike Graham
- Billy Grimes
- Walt Heap
- Ed Henke
- Bob Hoffman
- Lew Holder
- Harry Hopp
- Earl Howell
- Clyde Johnson
- Ed Kelley
- Bob Kelly
- Bob Kennedy
- Bill Kerr
- John Kimbrough
- Al Krueger
- Mort Landsberg
- Reid Lennan
- Len Levy
- Al Lolotai
- Andy Marefos
- Len Masini
- Jack McQuary
- Shorty McWilliams
- Bus Mertes
- Lou Mihajlovich
- Joe Mihal
- Bob Mitchell
- Paul Mitchell
- Jack Morton
- George Murphy
- Johnny Naumu
- Robert Nelson
- Don Nolander
- Bob Nowaskey
- Bernie Nygren
- Charlie O'Rourke
- Dick Ottele
- Mike Perrotti
- Bert Piggott
- Joyce Pipkin
- John Polanski
- Bill Radovich
- Knox Ramsey
- Bill Reinhard
- Bob Reinhard
- Hank Rockwell
- Hosea Rodgers
- Lin Sexton
- Bob Seymour
- Bill Smith
- Jim Smith
- Bob Sneddon
- Jim Spavital
- Bob Steuber
- George Taliaferro
- Buddy Tinsley
- Bob Titchenal
- Frank Trigilio
- Paul Vinnola
- Herman Wedemeyer
- Ben Whaley
- Dick Wilkins
- Ernie Williamson
- Abner Wimberly
- Bernie Winkler
- Dick Woodard
- Frank Yokas

== Louisville Brecks/Colonels ==
- Dan Bernoske
- Ed Berwick
- Chase Boldt
- Austin Brucklacher
- Ray Bush
- Harper Card
- Red Chenoweth
- Harry Curzon
- Jim Eiden
- Joe Engelhard
- Al Espie
- Tom Ferguson
- Bill Flannigan
- Salem Ford
- Al Gansberg
- Bill Giaver
- Dick Gibson
- Patsy Giugliano
- Gene Golsen
- Tom Golsen
- Vee Green
- Glenn Greenwood
- Edd Gregg
- Herb Gruber
- Steve Hanson
- Fatty Harris
- Austin Higgins
- Karl Hower
- Bill Howser
- Jim Irwin
- Larry Jackson
- Whitey Jansing
- Bob Karch
- Jim Kendrick
- Charlie Lanham
- Gar Leaf
- Henry Lewis
- Max MacCollum
- Joe Martin
- Bill McCaw
- John McDonald
- Brian McGrath
- Eddie Meeks
- Russ Meredith
- Lou Metzger
- Ted Moser
- Bill Netherton
- Harry Newland
- Charlie Olmstead
- Omensky
- Bo Otto
- Bob Padan
- Chuck Palmer
- John Quast
- Earl Reiser
- Ed Robinson
- John Rowan
- Lenny Sachs
- John Scanlon
- Walt Sechrist
- Gerry Sherry
- George Slagle
- Wilfred Smith
- Gaylord Stinchcomb
- Howard Stith
- Pete Vainowski
- Jimmy Van Dyke
- George Wanless
- Robert White
- Gene Wiggs
- Hubert Wiggs

== Miami Seahawks ==
- Ed Bell
- Paul Berezney
- Lamar Blount
- Daryl Cato
- Marty Comer
- Bill Daley
- Bill Davis
- Lamar Davis
- Kay Eakin
- Gene Ellenson
- Dick Erdlitz
- Terry Fox
- Monk Gafford
- Fred Gloden
- George Hekkers
- Ken Holley
- Harry Hopp
- Dick Horne
- Frank Hrabetin
- Pres Johnston
- Dub Jones
- Buddy Jungmichel
- Stan Kozlowski
- Joe Krivonak
- Walt McDonald
- Fondren Mitchell
- Jimmy Nelson
- Mitchell Olenski
- Bob Paffrath
- Hamp Pool
- Cotton Price
- Marion Pugh
- Cal Purdin
- Don Reece
- Jim Reynolds
- Prince Scott
- Jim Sivell
- Stan Stasica
- Jimmy Tarrant
- John Tavener
- Chuck Taylor
- Frank Trigilio
- Hub Ulrich
- Johnny Vardian
- Ken Whitlow
- Tex Williams
- Al Wukits
- George Zorich
