= Paul Lynch =

Paul Lynch may refer to:

- Paul Lynch (politician), Australian politician
- Paul Lynch (director) (born 1946), English television director
- Paul Lynch (canoeist) (born 1967), Australian sprint canoeist
- Paul Lynch (footballer) (born 1973), Australian Football League player
- Paul Lynch (hurler) (1938–2014), Irish hurler
- Paul Lynch (writer) (born 1977), Irish writer; awarded the 2023 Booker Prize
- Paul Lynch (American football) (1901–1961), American football player
- Paul Henry Allen Lynch, world record holder for push-ups
