= Corl =

Corl may refer to:

- Harry L. Corl (1914–1942), a United States Navy officer and Navy Cross recipient
  - USS Harry L. Corl (APD-108), a United States Navy high-speed transport in commission from 1945 to 1946
- Corl Zimmerman (1901–1967), American basketball player
- Conference on Robot Learning (CoRL), an international robotics & machine learning conference

== See also ==
- Dean Corll (1939-1973), American serial killer and pedophile, also known as "The Candy Man"
- Coral (disambiguation)
- Carl (disambiguation)
- KORL (disambiguation)
