= Karch =

Karch is a name. Notable people with the name include:

- Karch Kiraly (born 1960), American volleyball player and coach
- Bob Karch (1894–1958), American football tackle in the National Football League
- Charles A. Karch (1875–1932), American Representative from Illinois
- Frederick J. Karch (1917–2009), United States Marine Corps officer
- Karla Karch (born 1964), Canadian basketball player
- Oswald Karch (1917–2009), German racing driver
- Roy Karch (born 1946), American director of pornographic films
