= Wiper =

Wiper may refer to:

- Windscreen wiper
- Wiper, a Pakistani English term for a squeegee
- Wiper (occupation), a cleaner in the engine room of a ship
- Wiper (malware), a type of malware erasing critical data
- Wiper, a term for a hybrid striped bass
- Wiper, a term for the moving contact on a potentiometer
- Wiper, another brand name for the Lawnbott
- Don Wiper (1900–1961), American football player
- Scott Wiper (born 1970), American writer, film director and actor
- Wiper (One Piece), a character from the manga One Piece
- Wipers (band), an American punk rock group
- Wiper Democratic Movement – Kenya, a 21st-century political party
- Ypres, a city in Belgium nicknamed Wipers by British troops in the First World War
  - The Wipers Times, a First World War trench magazine published by British soldiers in the Ypres Salient
