= Johnny Roepke =

American football player (1905–1962)

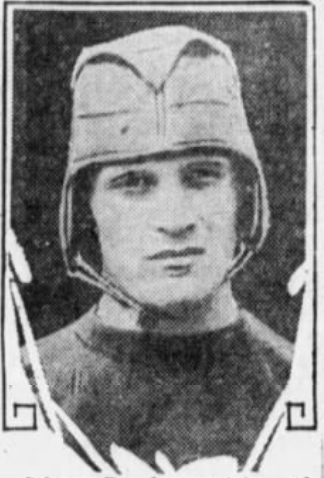
- Roepke pictured in The Mansfield News, 1927

No. 6
- Position: Halfback

Personal information
- Born: December 28, 1905; Jersey City, New Jersey, U.S.
- Died: February 26, 1962 (aged 56); Passaic, New Jersey, U.S.
- Listed height: 5 ft 11 in (1.80 m)
- Listed weight: 175 lb (79 kg)

Career information
- High school: William L. Dickinson (Jersey City)
- College: Penn State

Career history
- Frankford Yellow Jackets (1928); Atlantic City Tornadoes (1929); Clifton Heights Orange & Black (1929); Upper Darby Greenbacks (1930–1931); Paterson Night Hawks (1932)

Awards and highlights
- Third-team All-American (1927)

Career NFL statistics
- Games played: 10
- Games started: 3
- Touchdowns: 1
- Stats at Pro Football Reference

John Peter Roepke (December 28, 1905 – February 26, 1962) was an American football halfback who played one season in the National Football League (NFL) for the Frankford Yellow Jackets as well as four seasons in minor leagues with the Atlantic City Tornadoes, Clifton Heights Orange & Black, Upper Darby Greenbacks, and Paterson Night Hawks. A native of New Jersey, he attended Penn State University, playing football, baseball, and basketball before graduating in 1928. He was selected to the College Football All-America Team following his senior season of 1927. Roepke also briefly played professional baseball for the Scranton Miners in 1928.

== Early life ==
Roepke was born on December 28, 1905, in Jersey City, New Jersey. He attended William L. Dickinson High School there, playing football, baseball, and basketball. Following his third season of high school, where he was named all state as a halfback, Roepke was elected team captain for his senior year of 1923.

Shortly before his last sports game with the high school, the state championship baseball game against Plainfield High School on June 23, 1924, Roepke announced that he would attend Penn State University. As his team's pitcher, he threw a no-hitter versus Plainfield, only letting two people get to a base through a walk.

== College career ==
During his freshman year of 1924, Roepke did not see much action for the Penn State athletic teams. As a sophomore in 1925, he earned a varsity letter and got his first action as a football player. After their game against West Virginia, Roepke was given drills to replace Bas Gray as team punter. He also was given the starting left halfback position for their season finale against Pittsburgh, replacing Bill Pritchard.

Roepke was described by The Wilkes-Barre Record as a "good punter, the best forward passer on the squad and a shifty man with the ball [which] makes him a triple threat player." With Roepke starting at halfback during the season finale, Penn State lost 7–23 before 50,000 fans. The Penn State team ended the year with a record of 4–4–1.

In basketball, Roepke earned a starting position for the 1925–26 team, replacing Mike Hamas, who retired due to injury. He played the forward position.

Roepke was injured playing football during their game against Lebanon Valley on October 2, 1926, forcing him to miss their games against Marietta College, Notre Dame, Syracuse, and George Washington. It left the team without a punter, as he was "the best kicking regular on the squad." His injury required an operation, and sidelined him for "at least a month." "Bus" Harrington was shifted to left halfback as a replacement for Roepke. He returned for their game against Bucknell, where he scored three of nine points, contributing to the other six, and helped shut them out 9–0.

Following the season finale, a loss against Pittsburgh, Roepke was mentioned on several all-Eastern teams for his performance, as well as earned the team captain position for his senior season of 1927.

By the end of week two in 1927, Roepke had already scored 36 points and was the leader in the eastern United States. He scored eight against Lebanon Valley in week one, and "ran wild" versus Gettysburg the following week, scoring 28 out of his team's 34 points. Against Syracuse during week five, Roepke kicked the game-winning field goal in the fourth quarter to win 9–6. It was Penn State's first ever win in their rivalry with Syracuse. By mid-November, Roepke was "considered by many as an outstanding candidate for the all-America team," according to the Ohio News Journal.

By November 21, Roepke was third in the eastern United States in scoring with 89 points, only behind Bob Nork of Georgetown and Myles Lane of Dartmouth. He finished the season ranked fourth in the eastern U.S., after dropping one spot to Jack Conner. He made a total of 12 touchdowns, one field goal, and 14 extra points, earning a third-team All-America selection by Walter Eckersall at the end of the season.

== Professional career ==
=== Baseball ===
Johnny Roepke
- Pitcher
- Batted: Right Threw: Right

Professional baseball debut
- June 13, 1928, for the Scranton Miners

Last appearance
- June 13, 1928, for the Scranton Miners

Teams
- Scranton Miners (1928)

Following his graduation from Penn State, Roepke began a professional baseball career in the New York–Pennsylvania League with the Scranton Miners as a pitcher. He played his first game on June 13, 1928, allowing nine hits in two innings pitched before being benched. The Miners lost the game, 4–10, against the York White Roses. It was his only appearance with the team. The Miners finished the season with a record of 55–78, placing seventh in the league.

=== Football ===
After the baseball season ended, Roepke tried out professional football, playing for the Frankford Yellow Jackets of the National Football League (NFL). He appeared in 10 out of the team's 16 games, starting three of them at a "back" position. In week three of the season, a 10–6 victory over the Providence Steam Roller, Roepke scored his first career points on a field goal. In a 19–0 shutout over the Pottsville Maroons, he scored his first professional touchdown, on a 12-yard rush in the first quarter. In week ten, he threw a touchdown pass to Carl Waite. He also kicked one extra point during the season, as the Yellow Jackets placed second in the league.

Roepke left Frankford after the season to join the Atlantic City Tornadoes, the first 1929 opponents of his former team. After the first game, a 0–6 loss for Atlantic City, Roepke left the team and joined the Clifton Heights Orange & Black. He finished the season with Clifton before joining the Upper Darby Greenbacks the following year. He returned with the Greenbacks for the 1931 season. In October 1932, Roepke was signed by the Paterson Night Hawks prior to their game against the New York Giants. He made two appearances for the Night Hawks before retiring.

== Later life and death ==
Roepke was married on December 22, 1928, to Anne Kost of Tyrone, Pennsylvania.

Roepke later worked for the Manhattan Rubber Division of Raybestos, Inc. He died on February 26, 1962, at the age of 56, following a short illness.
