= Gene Felker =

American football player (1929–2013)

No. 85
- Position: End

Personal information
- Born: March 4, 1929; Milwaukee, Wisconsin
- Died: March 12, 2013 (aged 84); Mesa, Arizona, U.S.
- Listed height: 6 ft 1 in (1.85 m)
- Listed weight: 198 lb (90 kg)

Career information
- High school: North Division (Milwaukee)
- College: Wisconsin (1948–1951)
- NFL draft: 1952: 19th round, 218th overall pick

Career history
- Dallas Texans (1952)

Career NFL statistics
- Receptions: 3
- Receiving yards: 63
- Touchdowns: 1
- Stats at Pro Football Reference

Eugene Marvin "Gene" Felker (March 4, 1929–March 12, 2013) was an American professional football end in the National Football League for the Dallas Texans (1952). He played at the collegiate level at the University of Wisconsin–Madison.

Felker was one of at least 345 NFL players to be diagnosed after death with chronic traumatic encephalopathy (CTE), which is caused by repeated hits to the head.

== See also ==
- List of Dallas Texans (NFL) players
- List of NFL players with chronic traumatic encephalopathy
