= Harvey Long =

American football player (1906–1952)

No. 27
- Positions: Tackle, guard

Personal information
- Born: September 11, 1906; Plymouth, Wisconsin, U.S.
- Died: October 8, 1952 (aged 46); South Haven, Michigan, U.S.
- Listed height: 6 ft 0 in (1.83 m)
- Listed weight: 195 lb (88 kg)

Career information
- High school: Sheboygan (Sheboygan, Wisconsin)
- College: Detroit (1926–1928)

Career history
- Chicago Bears (1929); Frankford Yellow Jackets (1930)

Career statistics
- Games played: 5
- Games started: 3

Harvey John Long (September 11, 1906 – October 8, 1952) was an American football player. He played professionally in the National Football League (NFL) as tackle and guard for the Chicago Bears in 1929 and the Frankford Yellow Jackets in 1930. Long played college football at the University of Detroit Mercy.

Long later operate a floristry in South Haven, Michigan and a greenhouse in Bangor, Michigan. He died on October 8, 1952, in South Haven, of pneumonia.

== See also ==
- List of Chicago Bears players
- List of Frankford Yellow Jackets players
