= Frank J. Skinner =

American football player and boxing official (1891–1935)

Profile
- Position: Tackle

Personal information
- Born: April 6, 1891; Montreal, Quebec, Canada
- Died: October 18, 1935 (aged 44); Indianapolis, Indiana

Career information
- College: Purdue

Career history
- Evansville Crimson Giants (1922)

Frank J. Skinner, also known as Frank William Skinner Jr. (April 6, 1891 – October 18, 1935) was an American football player and boxing official.

Skinner was born in 1891 in Montreal, Quebec, Canada, where his father was engaged in construction work at the time. He attended high school in Indianapolis, Indiana.

He played college football for Purdue. He later played three years for the Hammond Pros, two years for Wabash A.A. and for the Indianapolis Capitols before signing with the Evansville Crimson Giants in September 1922 where he appeared in one NFL game during the 1922 season. He also played for a team in Marion, Indiana, and was later described as "one of the oldest professional football players in Indiana in years of service."

Skinner's brother, Lew Skinner, also played in the National Football League. The Skinner brothers were described in 1919 as "all they are said to be; fast as they make them and scrappers to the final whistle."

After his playing career ended, Skinner later officiated at boxing matches in Indianapolis. He also operated the Skinner Radio Co. He died from a heart attack in 1935 at age 44 at his home in Indianapolis.
