= Jerry Lunz =

American football player (1903–1974)

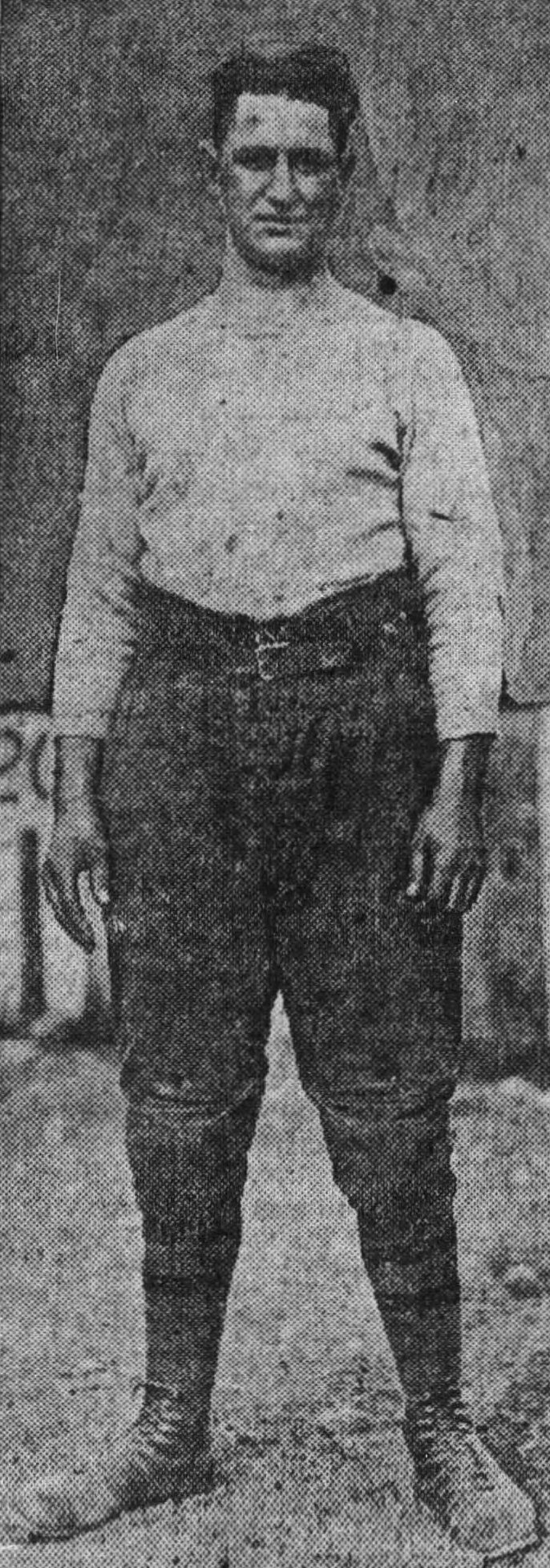
- Lunz as a tackle for Marquette in 1923

No. 91
- Positions: Guard, tackle

Personal information
- Born: March 13, 1903; Milwaukee, Wisconsin, U.S.
- Died: January 11, 1974 (aged 70); Milwaukee, Wisconsin, U.S.
- Listed height: 6 ft 3 in (1.91 m)
- Listed weight: 210 lb (95 kg)

Career information
- College: Marquette

Career history
- Chicago Cardinals (1925–1926); Frankford Yellow Jackets (1930)

Career statistics
- Games played: 27
- Games started: 24
- Stats at Pro Football Reference

Gerald A. Lunz (March 13, 1903 - January 11, 1974) was an American football player who played for the Chicago Cardinals and Frankford Yellow Jackets in 1925, 1926, and 1930 in the National Football League (NFL). He played at the collegiate level at Marquette University.

== See also ==
- List of Frankford Yellow Jackets players
