= Hust Stockton =

American football player (1901–1967)

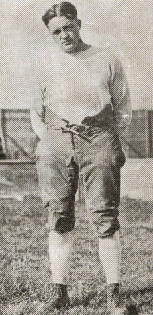
- Stockton in 1926 with the NFL's Frankford Yellow Jackets

Profile
- Positions: Fullback, Halfback, Tailback

Personal information
- Born: September 23, 1901; Parma, Idaho, U.S.
- Died: April 27, 1967 (aged 65); Bremerton, Washington, U.S.
- Listed height: 5 ft 11 in (1.80 m)
- Listed weight: 193 lb (88 kg)

Career information
- High school: Portland (OR) Columbia Prep
- College: Gonzaga

Career history
- Frankford Yellow Jackets (1925–1928); Boston Bulldogs (1929); Providence Steamroller (1929)

Awards and highlights
- NFL champion (1926); GB Press-Gazette: 2nd team All-NFL (1926)
- Stats at Pro Football Reference

John Houston Stockton (September 23, 1901 – April 27, 1967) was a professional football player, a back in the late 1920s in the National Football League (NFL). He played with the Frankford Yellow Jackets from 1925 until 1928, and was a member of Yellow Jackets' 1926 NFL Championship team. During his final season in 1929, Stockton split time between the Boston Bulldogs and the Providence Steamroller. He was the grandfather of basketball Hall of Fame inductee, John Stockton, who played point guard for the National Basketball Association's Utah Jazz from 1984 to 2003.

== Early life ==
Born in Parma, Idaho, Stockton set high school football scoring records as a back at Columbia Prep in Portland, Oregon. Originally enrolled at St. Mary's College, then in Oakland, California, he transferred as a sophomore in 1922 to Gonzaga in Spokane, Washington, where he played baseball and football. A triple-threat halfback, Stockton threw passes to Ray Flaherty, a future member of the Pro Football Hall of Fame, and their head coach was Gus Dorais, who popularized the passing game as a player at Notre Dame with teammate Knute Rockne. While in college, Stockton was compared to the top back of the era, Red Grange of Illinois.

== Professional career ==
During a Thanksgiving Day game in 1926, a pass from Stockton to Two-Bits Homan netted the Yellow Jackets a 20–14 victory over the Green Bay Packers. Stockton made the same pass to Homan again that season, this time against the Chicago Cardinals for a 7–6 Frankford win. In 1928, against the Chicago Cardinals, Stockton threw an 18-yard pass to Carl Waite for a 19–0 win for the Jackets. At the start of his last season in 1929, Stockton and former Gonzaga teammate Flaherty were in training camp with the New York Giants.

Stockton was an assistant coach at his alma mater Gonzaga during the 1927 season.

== After football ==
Following his football career, he was briefly a professional wrestler in Spokane, and worked for the highway department in Idaho.
