= Bill Berrehsem =

American football player (1903–1968)

William Stewart Berrehsem
Profile
- Position: T-E

Personal information
- Born: April 25, 1903; Wheeling, West Virginia, U.S.
- Died: November 1968
- Listed height: 5 ft 10 in (1.78 m)
- Listed weight: 195 lb (88 kg)

Career information
- High school: Linsly Military Institute (Wheeling, West Virginia)
- College: Washington & Jefferson College, United States Naval Academy

Career history
- Columbus Tigers (1926)
- Stats at Pro Football Reference

William Stewart Berrehsem was an American professional football player for the Columbus Tigers. He attended Linsly Military Institute and Washington & Jefferson College. He then attended United States Naval Academy. He died in 1968.

== See also ==
- List of Columbus Tigers players
- Washington & Jefferson Presidents football
