= Jack Storer (American football) =

American football player (1900–1927)

No. 10
- Position: Tailback

Personal information
- Born: November 11, 1900; Wheeling, West Virginia, U.S.
- Died: January 16, 1927 (aged 26); Wheeling, West Virginia, U.S.
- Listed height: 5 ft 10 in (1.78 m)
- Listed weight: 180 lb (82 kg)

Career information
- High school: Linsly School (Wheeling); Mercersburg Academy (Mercersburg, Pennsylvania)
- College: Lehigh (1921–1923)

Career history
- Frankford Yellow Jackets (1924)

Career statistics
- Games played: 14
- Games started: 13
- Rushing touchdowns: 7
- Receiving touchdowns: 1
- Passing touchdowns: 1
- Stats at Pro Football Reference

John Waddell Storer Jr. (November 11, 1900 – January 16, 1927) was an American professional football tailback who played in the National Football League (NFL) with the Frankford Yellow Jackets. He played college football for the Lehigh Brown and White.

== Early life ==
Storer was born on November 11, 1900, in Wheeling, West Virginia. He attended Linsly School in Wheeling and Mercersburg Academy in Mercersburg, Pennsylvania.

== College career ==
Storer attended Lehigh University in Bethlehem, Pennsylvania, where he played college football for the Lehigh Brown and White from 1921 to 1923. He was a three-year letterman from 1921 to 1923. In 1923, Storer was the team's punter, quarterback and left halfback. He was named the captain of the football team for 1924 but did not play for the team.

== Professional career ==
In 1924, Storer played his lone season of professional football with the Frankford Yellow Jackets of the National Football League (NFL). He played in 14 games, starting 13, rushing for seven touchdowns and had one receiving and passing touchdown.

== Later life ==
In February 1925, Storer contracted pneumonia, which forced him to retire from professional football. On January 16, 1927, he died, after the illness developed into tuberculosis.
