= Clarence Drayer =

American football player (1901–1977)

- Drayer, 1963

Profile
- Position: Tackle

Personal information
- Born: August 29, 1901; Columbus, Ohio, U.S.
- Died: October 8, 1977 (aged 76); Indianapolis, Indiana, U.S.
- Listed height: 6 ft 4 in (1.93 m)
- Listed weight: 225 lb (102 kg)

Career information
- High school: Indianapolis Tech (IN)
- College: Illinois

Career history
- Dayton Triangles (1925)

Clarence Tilghman "C.T." or "Shorty" Drayer (August 29, 1901 – October 8, 1977) was an American football player. He played college football for Illinois from 1921 to 1923 and professional football in the National Football League (NFL) for the Dayton Triangles in 1925.

== Early life ==
Drayer was born in 1901 in Columbus, Ohio. He attended Arsenal Tech High School in Indianapolis.

== Football player ==
Drayer played college football as a tackle for the University of Illinois from 1921 to 1923. He later played in the National Football League (NFL) as a tackle for the Dayton Triangles in 1925. He appeared in four NFL games.

== Later life ==
After his football career ended, Drayer operated a stone-contracting firm from 1926 to 1948. He was director of the Indianapolis Department of Public Works and Supply from 1957 to 1960. He was also the unsuccessful Republican candidate in the 1963 Indianapolis mayoral election. He died in 1977 at age 76 at his home in Indianapolis.
