= Jim Spencer (American football) =

American football player (1901–1961)

Profile
- Position: Guard

Personal information
- Born: November 3, 1901; Hawaii
- Died: March 6, 1961 (aged 59); Honolulu, U.S.
- Listed height: 6 ft 0 in (1.83 m)
- Listed weight: 205 lb (93 kg)

Career information
- College: Dayton

Career history
- Dayton Triangles (1928–1929)

Career statistics
- Games: 11

Jim Spencer (November 3, 1901 – March 6, 1961) was an American football player. A native of Hawaii, he competed in football and track at the University of Dayton. He then played professional football in the National Football League (NFL) as a guard for the Dayton Triangles. He appeared in 11 NFL games, nine as a starter, during the 1928 and 1929 seasons.
