= Jerry Zeller =

American football player (1898–1968)

No. 10
- Positions: WB, TB

Personal information
- Born: June 3, 1898; Springfield, Ohio, U.S.
- Died: November 10, 1968 (aged 70); Columbus, Ohio, U.S.
- Listed height: 5 ft 11 in (1.80 m)
- Listed weight: 170 lb (77 kg)

Career information
- High school: Brazil (IN)
- College: Illinois

Career history
- Evansville Crimson Giants (1921)

Career statistics
- Games played: 4
- Games started: 2
- Touchdowns: 1
- Stats at Pro Football Reference

Gerald T. Zeller (June 3, 1898 – November 10, 1968) was an American football tailback who played one season for the Evansville Crimson Giants of the National Football League (NFL). He played college football at Illinois and appeared in four NFL games, scoring one touchdown.

== Early life ==
Zeller was born on June 3, 1898, in Springfield, Ohio. He went to high school at Brazil (IN). He went to college at Illinois Fighting Illini football.

== Professional career ==
In 1921, he played four games for the Evansville Crimson Giants. He scored one receiving touchdown. He wore number 10.

== Later life ==
He died on November 10, 1968, in Columbus, Ohio.
