= Bill O'Toole =

American football player

Milton Timothy O'Toole was a member of the Duluth Kelleys of the National Football League.

== Biography ==
O'Toole was born on June 16, 1902, in Trego, Wisconsin. He attended high school in Duluth, Minnesota.

== Career ==
O'Toole was a member of the Kelleys during the 1924 NFL season. He was a guard.
