= Roy Carlson (American football player) =

American football player (1906–1984)

Profile
- Positions: End, guard

Personal information
- Born: May 8, 1906; Chicago, U.S.
- Died: September 10, 1984 (aged 78); Phoenix, Arizona, U.S.
- Listed height: 5 ft 9 in (1.75 m)
- Listed weight: 178 lb (81 kg)

Career information
- College: Bradley

Career history
- Chicago Bears (1928); Dayton Triangles (1929)

Career NFL statistics
- Games: 16

Roy Harold Carlson (May 8, 1906 – September 10, 1984) was an American football player.

Carlson was born in 1906 in Chicago and attended Bowen High School. He enrolled at Bradley University in Peoria, Illinois, and played football for the Bradley Braves afrom 1924 to 1927. He later received a master's degree from the University of Chicago.

Carlson also professional football in the National Football League (NFL) as an end and guard for the Chicago Bears in 1928 and the Dayton Triangles in 1929. He appeared in 16 NFL games, seven as a starter.

Carlson later worked as a teacher and football coach at Joliet High School in Joliet, Illinois. He also served in the Army during World War II. He moved to Phoenix, Arizona, in 1969 and worked there for an architecture firm. Carlson died on September 10, 1984, in Phoenix, Arizona. He was survived by his wife, Ellen.
