= Russ Smith (guard) =

American football player (1895–1958)

No. 11 (1923), 16 (1924), 9 (1926)
- Position: Guard

Personal information
- Born: November 11, 1895; Carbondale, Illinois, U.S.
- Died: June 13, 1948 (aged 52); Johnston City, Illinois, U.S.
- Listed height: 5 ft 10 in (1.78 m)
- Listed weight: 220 lb (100 kg)

Career information
- College: University of Illinois; United States Naval Academy; Southern Illinois University

Career history
- Chicago Staleys/Bears (1921–1922); Milwaukee Badgers (1923); Canton Bulldogs (1923); Cleveland Bulldogs (1924); Chicago Bears (1925); Detroit Panthers (1925); Hammond Pros (1926)
- Stats at Pro Football Reference

Eugene Russell Smith (November 11, 1895 - June 13, 1948) was a professional football player during the early years of the National Football League (NFL) with the Chicago Staleys/Bears, Canton Bulldogs, Milwaukee Badgers, Cleveland Bulldogs, Detroit Panthers and Hammond Pros. Smith won NFL championships with the Staleys in 1921, the Canton Bulldogs in 1923 and the Cleveland Bulldogs in 1924. He played a total of 50 games in the NFL.
