= George Wanless =

American football player (1898–1961)

Profile
- Positions: Back, end, guard

Personal information
- Born: July 13, 1898; Louisville, Kentucky
- Died: November 1, 1961 (aged 63); Tampa, Florida
- Listed height: 5 ft 8 in (1.73 m)
- Listed weight: 160 lb (73 kg)

Career history
- Louisville Brecks (1922–1923)

Career statistics
- Games: 3
- Stats at Pro Football Reference

George Smith "Babe" Wanless (July 13, 1898 – November 1, 1961) was an American football player.

Wanless was born in Louisville, Kentucky, in 1898.

He played professional football as a back, end, and guard for the Louisville Brecks in the National Football League (NFL). He appeared in three NFL games during the 1922 and 1923 seasons.

After his football career ended, Wanless became an automobile dealer in Louisville. In 1924, he became the youngest Ford dealer. He had dealerships in both Louisville and West Point, Kentucky. In 1950, he moved to Tarpon Springs, Florida. He became manager of the Tarpon Springs chamber of commerce starting in 1956. He died in Tampa, Florida, in 1961.
