= Tom Ferguson (American football) =

American football player (1892–1979)

Profile
- Position: Tackle

Personal information
- Born: September 24, 1892; Henryville, Indiana, U.S.
- Died: December 8, 1979 (aged 87); Plantation, Florida, U.S.
- Listed height: 5 ft 10 in (1.78 m)
- Listed weight: 220 lb (100 kg)

Career information
- College: None

Career history
- Louisville Brecks (1921)

Career NFL statistics
- Games played: 2
- Games started: 2
- Stats at Pro Football Reference

Thomas B. Ferguson (September 24, 1892 – December 8, 1979) was an American football tackle for the Louisville Brecks of the American Professional Football Association (APFA) which later became the National Football League (NFL).
