= Jack McCarthy (American football) =

American football player (1903–1973)

Profile
- Position: Tackle

Personal information
- Born: October 4, 1903; San Francisco, California, U.S.
- Died: May 29, 1973 (aged 69)
- Listed weight: 186 lb (84 kg)

Career information
- College: California

Career history
- Duluth Eskimos (1927)

Career statistics
- Games: 8
- Stats at Pro Football Reference

John Lacey McCarthy (October 4, 1903 – May 29, 1973) was an American football player.

A native of San Francisco, McCarthy played college football for California. He later played professional football in the National Football League (NFL) as a tackle for the Duluth Eskimos during the 1927 season. He appeared in a total of eight NFL games, all of them as a starter.
