= Homer Ruh =

American football player (1895–1971)

Profile
- Positions: End, halfback

Personal information
- Born: September 19, 1895; Columbus, Ohio
- Died: October 4, 1971 (aged 76)
- Listed height: 5 ft 10 in (1.78 m)
- Listed weight: 178 lb (81 kg)

Career history
- Columbus Panhandles (1916–1917, 1919–1922); Columbus Tigers (1923–1925)
- Stats at Pro Football Reference

Homer Lewis "Tiny" Ruh (September 19, 1895 – October 4, 1971) was an American football player who played at the end and halfback positions.

He was born in Columbus, Ohio, in 1895 and attended that city's East High School. He then attended Ohio Wesleyan University where he starred as an Ohio Conference football player.

He played professional football for the Columbus Panhandles in 1916 and 1917. During World War I, he served in the Army and was the star end for the 37th Division ("Buckeye Division") football team. After the war, he returned to Columbus and appeared in 10 games at end for the Panhandles in 1919. He played at the end and safety positions and returned punts. In 1919, he was rated as "without peer as a receiver of the forward pass."

With the formation in 1920 of the American Professional Football League (later renamed the National Football League, the Panhandles were one of the original teams). Ruh appeared in nine games for the Panhandles in the inaugural NFL season of 1920 and continued with the Panhandles through the 1922 season and then with the Columbus Tigers from 1923 to 1925. He appeared in a total of 46 NFL games, 33 as a starter. In 1921, The Buffalo Times wrote of Ruh: "He is a wonderful player and a great all-around athlete, having starred in basketball and other sports."

Ruh died in 1971 in Hollywood, Florida, at age 76.
