= Rufe DeWitz =

American football back

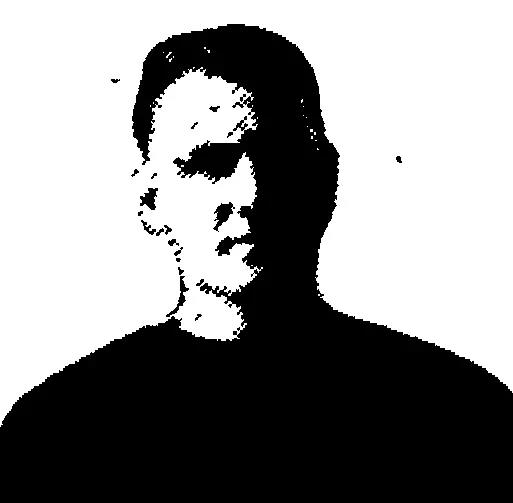
- DeWitz in 1923

No. 28
- Position: Back

Personal information
- Born: June 9, 1900; Stanton, Nebraska, U.S.
- Died: March 20, 1984 (aged 83); Roselle, Illinois, U.S.

Career information
- High school: Stanton
- College: Nebraska (1922–1923)

Career history
- Kansas City Cowboys (1924–1926)

Rufus Elbeno DeWitz (June 9, 1900 – March 20, 1984) was an American professional football back. He played for the Kansas City Cowboys of the National Football League (NFL).

== Life and career ==
DeWitz was born in Stanton, Nebraska. He was the brother of Herb DeWitz, a halfback for the Cleveland Bulldogs. He played high school football as an end at Stanton High School. He then enrolled at the University of Nebraska–Lincoln to play college football for the Nebraska Cornhuskers. He was a two-year varsity letterman from 1922 to 1923, and was captain of the football team.

In 1924, DeWitz joined the Kansas City Cowboys of the National Football League (NFL). He started seven games for the team, and played in eight games during the 1924 NFL season. He also started five games for the team, and played in eight games during the 1926 NFL season.

DeWitz coached football at Mendota High School in Mendota, Illinois, and coached at an academy school in Elgin, Illinois.

== Death ==
DeWitz died on March 20, 1984, of congestive heart failure in a care center in Roselle, Illinois, at the age of 83.
