= Jimmy Van Dyke =

American football player (1898–1980)

Profile
- Position: Back

Personal information
- Born: October 2, 1898; Louisville, Kentucky
- Died: August 30, 1980 (aged 81); Louisville, Kentucky
- Listed height: 5 ft 7 in (1.70 m)
- Listed weight: 140 lb (64 kg)

Career information
- High school: Louisville Male (KY)

Career history
- Louisville Brecks (1921–1923)

Career statistics
- Games: 5
- Stats at Pro Football Reference

James Bemiss Van Dyke (October 2, 1898 – August 30, 1980) was an American football player.

Van Dyke was born in Louisville, Kentucky, in 1898. He attended Louisville Male High School. He was captain of Louisville' Male's football team in 1919. In November 1919, he was disqualified from the team as he had turned 21 years old and thus exceeded the age limit for interscholastic competition.

Van Dyke also played professional football as a back for the Louisville Brecks in the National Football League (NFL). He appeared in five NFL games, four as a starter, during the 1921, 1922, and 1923 seasons. He also played for and/or coached several other professional or semi-professional sports teams, including the following:

- He was player-coach for the Clifton football team in 1923 and 1924.
- He was captain of the Epps-Kola football team in 1925.
- He was player-coach of the Southern Stars basketball team in 1926.
- He was coach of the Clifton Athletic Club football team in 1931.

Van Dyke died in 1980 in Louisville.
