= Salem Ford =

American football player (1896–1976)

Profile
- Position: Halfback

Personal information
- Born: February 14, 1896; Louisville, Kentucky
- Died: June 16, 1976 (aged 80); Louisville, Kentucky
- Listed height: 5 ft 7 in (1.70 m)
- Listed weight: 150 lb (68 kg)

Career information
- High school: Male (KY)
- College: Louisville

Career history
- Louisville Brecks (1922–1923)

Career statistics
- Games played: 4
- Games started: 1
- Stats at Pro Football Reference

Salem Holland Ford (February 14, 1896 – June 16, 1976) was an American football halfback. He played college football at the University of Louisville from 1914 to 1916 and professional football in the National Football League (NFL) for the Louisville Brecks in 1922 and 1923.

== Early life ==
Ford was born in 1896 in Louisville, Kentucky, and attended Louisville Male High School. He attended the University of Louisville and played for the Louisville football team from 1914 to 1916. In 1914, he set a Louisville record with a 48-yard field goal by dropkick. He served in the Army during World War I. His father, Arthur Younger Ford, served as president of the University of Louisville from 1921 to 1926.

== Professional football ==
In October 1922, six year after his final year of college football, Ford was signed by the Louisville Brecks of the National Football League (NFL). He appeared in four NFL games during the 1922 and 1923 seasons.

== Family and later years ==
Ford was married to Sarah Johnson Brashear in 1925; they had two daughters. After his football career ended, Ford worked for 38 years as a lumber buyer for the Mengel Co. He retired in 1961 and died in 1976 at age 90 at Norton-Children's Hospitals in Louisville.
