= Drip Wilson =

American football player (1907–1950)

No. 44
- Position: Center

Personal information
- Born: May 4, 1907; Sharon, Pennsylvania, U.S.
- Died: November 25, 1950 (aged 43); Massillon, Ohio, U.S.

Career information
- High school: Sharon (PA)
- College: St. Bonaventure

Career history
- Cleveland Indians (1931)

Career statistics
- Games played: 1
- Stats at Pro Football Reference

Earl Thomas "Drip" Wilson (May 4, 1907 (Note: Date disputed: Pro-Football-Reference.com lists March 17, 1905; Pro Football Archives.com lists May 4, 1907; different obituaries list an age of forty-eight or forty-three; his grave claims 1907) – November 25, 1950) was an American football center who played one season for the Cleveland Indians of the National Football League (NFL).

Previously, Wilson played college football at St. Bonaventure.

== Biography ==
Drip Wilson was born on May 4, 1907, in Sharon, Pennsylvania. He attended high school in Sharon before playing college football at St. Bonaventure. Fewer than fifteen people from St. Bonaventure ever played professionally.

After playing at St. Bonaventure, he played professionally for one season with the Cleveland Indians of the National Football League (NFL); however, Wilson only made one appearance with the Indians, which folded the next season, ending his playing career.

After playing professionally, he served as an assistant coach for Albion and Lawrence Park during four seasons.

He then accepted a position with an industrial firm in Massillon, Ohio.

== Death and interment ==
Wilson died on November 25, 1950, in Massillon. His cause of death was reportedly a heart attack caused by shoveling snow in his driveway. He was buried at St. Mary's Cemetery in Mercer County, Pennsylvania.
