= Pots Clark =

American football player (1900–1973)

Profile
- Position: Halfback

Personal information
- Born: November 26, 1900; Ogden, Utah
- Died: September 18, 1973 (aged 72); Ontario, California
- Listed height: 5 ft 7 in (1.70 m)
- Listed weight: 180 lb (82 kg)

Career information
- College: Nevada

Career history
- Duluth Eskimos (1927); Frankford Yellow Jackets (1927)

Career statistics
- Games: 8
- Stats at Pro Football Reference

Alfred F. "Pots" Clark (November 26, 1900 – September 18, 1973) was an American football player.

A native of Ogden, Utah, Clark played college football for Nevada. He later played professional football in the National Football League (NFL) as a tackle for the Duluth Eskimos and Frankford Yellow Jackets during the 1927 season. He appeared in a total of seven NFL games, four of them as a starter.
