= Paul Fitzgibbon =

American football player and neurologist (1903–1975)

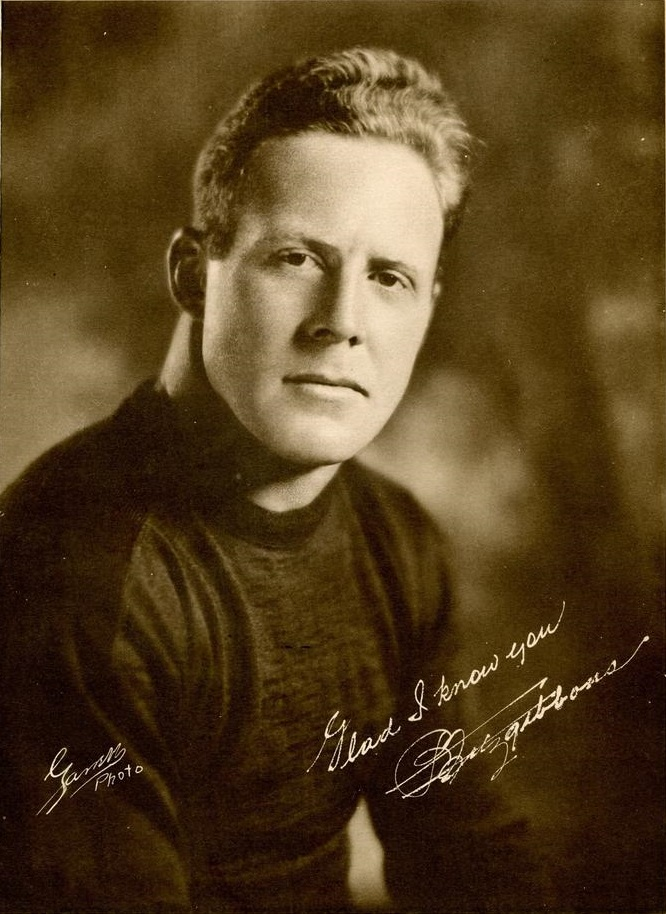

No. 27, 5, 14, 18
- Position: Wide receiver

Personal information
- Born: March 21, 1903; South Dakota, U.S.
- Died: March 12, 1975 (aged 71); Los Angeles, U.S.
- Listed height: 5 ft 8 in (1.73 m)
- Listed weight: 176 lb (80 kg)

Career information
- College: Creighton

Career history
- 1926: Duluth Eskimos
- 1927: Frankford Yellow Jackets
- 1928: Chicago Cardinals
- 1930–1932: Green Bay Packers
- Stats at Pro Football Reference

Joseph Paul Fitzgibbon (March 21, 1903 – March 12, 1975) was an American professional football player who was a wide receiver for six seasons for the Duluth Eskimos, Frankford Yellow Jackets, Chicago Cardinals, and Green Bay Packers. Following his football career Paul Fitzgibbon became a neurologist and later one of the seven founding members of the Permanente Medical Group, now Kaiser Permanente.
