= Art Beckley =

American football player (1901–1965)

Profile
- Position: Back

Personal information
- Born: September 1, 1901; Bloomfield, Iowa, U.S.
- Died: January 6, 1965 (aged 63); Alameda County, California, U.S. (age 63)
- Listed height: 5 ft 10 in (1.78 m)
- Listed weight: 180 lb (82 kg)

Career information
- High school: Bay City Central (MI)
- College: Michigan Agricultural College

Career history
- Dayton Triangles (1926)
- Stats at Pro Football Reference

Arthur K. Beckley (September 1, 1901 – January 6, 1965) was an American football player and politician. He played college football for the Michigan Agricultural Aggies from 1921 to 1924 and professional football for the Dayton Triangles during the 1926 season. He served as a city councilman in Berkeley, California, for 20 years.

== Early life ==
Beckley was born in 1901 in Bloomfield, Iowa. He attended Central High School in Bay City, Michigan, and then enrolled at Michigan Agricultural College (now known as Michigan State University). He played college football for the Michigan Agricultural Aggies from 1921 to 1924.

== Professional football ==
Beckley also played professional football in the National Football League as a halfback for the Dayton Triangles during the 1926 season. He started five games for the Triangles.

== Later life ==
After his football career ended, Beckley moved to California. He became a vice president of Cutter Laboratories and served for 20 years on the Berkeley city council. He died in 1965 in Merritt Hospital in Oakland, California.
