= Earl Reisser =

American football player (1899–1956)

Profile
- Position: Halfback

Personal information
- Born: May 26, 1899; Guthrie, Kentucky, US
- Died: September 29, 1956 (aged 57); Louisville, Kentucky, US
- Listed weight: 160 lb (73 kg)

Career information
- High school: Male (KY)

Career history
- Louisville Brecks (1923)

Career statistics
- Games: 2
- Stats at Pro Football Reference

Earl Schwab "Jack" Reisser (May 26, 1899 – September 29, 1956), also referenced as Earl Reiser, was an American football player.

A native of Todd County, Kentucky, he moved to Louisville as a boy. He attended Louisville Male High School where he played at the fullback position for the football team during the 1917 season .

He served in the United States Navy during World War I and played on the Great Lakes Navy football team.

After the war, he played several years of semiprofessional football with the Louisville Brecks. The Brecks joined the National Football League in 1921, and Reisser played halfback for the 1923 team. He was described in November 1923 as "the hardest smashing back of the season."

Reisser continued living in Louisville and helped organize the Louisville Tanks and Stansanco Club football teams in the 1930s. He worked for 35 years for the bathroom-fixtures division of American Radiator & Standard Sanitary Corporation.

Reisser and his wife Dolores Houchin Reisser had three sons, Richard, Arthur, and Earl Jr. Reisser died in 1956 at age 57 of a heart ailment.
