= Don Straw =

American football player (1896–1961)

Profile
- Position: Guard / Tackle

Personal information
- Born: November 22, 1896; Detroit, Michigan, U.S.
- Died: July 31, 1961 (aged 64)
- Listed height: 5 ft 11 in (1.80 m)
- Listed weight: 210 lb (95 kg)

Career information
- High school: Detroit (MI) Central
- College: Washington & Jefferson

Career history
- Detroit Heralds (1920); Detroit Tigers (1921)
- Stats at Pro Football Reference

Donald McAlpine Straw (November 22, 1896 – July 31, 1961) was an American professional football player for the Detroit Tigers and Detroit Heralds. He attended Washington & Jefferson College. He attended Central High School in Detroit, Michigan.
