= Jimmy Manion =

American football player (1904–1978)

Profile
- Position: Guard

Personal information
- Born: September 20, 1904; Jasper, Minnesota, U.S.
- Died: July 11, 1978 (aged 73); Hennepin County, Minnesota, U.S.
- Listed height: 5 ft 10 in (1.78 m)
- Listed weight: 178 lb (81 kg)

Career information
- High school: St. Mary's (MN)
- College: St. Thomas

Career history
- Duluth Eskimos (1926–1927)

Career statistics
- Games: 17
- Stats at Pro Football Reference

James Henry Manion (September 20, 1904 – July 11, 1978) was an American football lineman. He played college football for the St. Thomas Tommies from 1922 to 1925 and professional football in the National Football League (NFL) for the Duluth Eskimos during the 1926 and 1927 seasons.

== Early life ==
Manion was born in 1904 at Jasper, Minnesota. He was the son of James H. and Lena Manion and grew up on their farm. He attended St. Mary's High School in Winona, Minnesota. He also attended St. Mary's College in Winona before transferring to St. Thomas College in St. Paul. He played college football for the St. Thomas Tommies from 1922 to 1925.

== Professional football ==
Manion also played professional football in the National Football League (NFL) as a guard for the Duluth Eskimos during the 1926 and 1927 seasons. He appeared in a total of 17 NFL games, 12 of them as a starter.

== Later life ==
Manion graduated from St. Thomas with a law degree. After his football career, he practiced law at Slayton and Jasper, Minnesota, until 1934. He moved to Pipestone, Minnesota, in 1934, and served as Pipestone county attorney for 32 years. He also served as a probate and county judge later in his career.

Manion was married to Mary Gunderson in 1938. She died in 1972, and Manion was remarried to Vi Engbarth in 1973. He had two sons, James and Michael. Manion died in 1978 at age 73 in a Minneapolis hospital.
