= Doc Kelley =

American football player (1902–1963)

Profile
- Position: Running back / halfback

Personal information
- Born: March 1, 1902; Chicago, Illinois
- Died: July 5, 1963 (aged 61); Chatham County, Georgia
- Listed height: 5 ft 10 in (1.78 m)
- Listed weight: 170 lb (77 kg)

Career information
- High school: Central (Superior, WI)
- College: Northwestern

Career history
- Duluth Kelleys/Eskimos (1924–1926)
- Stats at Pro Football Reference

Albert James Kelley (March 1, 1902 – July 5, 1963) played in three seasons with the Duluth Kelleys/Eskimos of the National Football League. He was a running back and halfback.
