= John Barrett (American football) =

American football player (1899–1966)

No. 7, 1, 30, 18
- Position: Offensive lineman

Personal information
- Born: February 25, 1899; Holyoke, Massachusetts
- Died: September 30, 1966 (aged 67); Detroit, Michigan
- Listed height: 5 ft 6 in (1.68 m)
- Listed weight: 170 lb (77 kg)

Career information
- High school: Holyoke High School (Holyoke, Massachusetts)
- College: Detroit Titans

Career history
- Akron Pros (1924–1925); Detroit Panthers (1926); Pottsville Maroons (1927); Detroit Wolverines (1928)
- Stats at Pro Football Reference

John Patrick Barrett (February 25, 1899 – September 30, 1966) was a professional football player from Holyoke, Massachusetts. He played during the early years of the National Football League. A graduate of the University of Detroit Mercy, Barrett made his professional debut in the NFL in 1924 with the Akron Pros. He played for the Pros, Detroit Wolverines, Detroit Panthers and Pottsville Maroons over the course of his career.
