= George Robison =

American football player (1931–2016)

No. 33
- Position: Guard

Personal information
- Born: February 14, 1931; Jackson County, Missouri
- Died: August 6, 2016 (aged 85); Sparks, Nevada
- Listed height: 6 ft 2 in (1.88 m)
- Listed weight: 215 lb (98 kg)

Career information
- High school: Piedmont (CA)
- College: VMI

Career history
- Dallas Texans (1952)

Career statistics
- Games played: 4
- Stats at Pro Football Reference

George Alfred Robison (February 14, 1931 – August 6, 2016) was an American football guard who played for the Dallas Texans. He played college football at Virginia Military Institute, having previously attended Piedmont in Piedmont, California.
