= Ken Crawford (American football) =

American football player (1898–1957)

Profile
- Position: Back

Personal information
- Born: September 7, 1898; Woodstock, Ohio, U.S.
- Died: March 9, 1957 (aged 58)
- Listed height: 5 ft 11 in (1.80 m)
- Listed weight: 185 lb (84 kg)

Career information
- High school: Urbana (Urbana, Ohio), Woodstock HS (Woodstock, OH)
- College: Miami (OH)

Career history
- Akron Pros (1920); Hammond Pros (1921); Cincinnati Celts (1921); Dayton Triangles (1923); Hammond Pros (1925)

Awards and highlights
- NFL champion (1920)

Career statistics
- Games played: 13
- Games started: 5
- Stats at Pro Football Reference

Kenneth James Crawford (September 7, 1898 – March 9, 1957) was an American professional football player, who played in the early National Football League (NFL) for the Akron Pros, Hammond Pros, Dayton Triangles and Cincinnati Celts. As a member of the 1920 Akron Pros, Crawford won the very first NFL Championship with the team. Prior to his professional career, he played at the college level at Miami University.
