= Tom Long (American football) =

American football player (1899–1969)

Profile
- Position: Guard

Personal information
- Born: August 7, 1899; Columbus, Ohio, U.S.
- Died: July 22, 1969 (aged 69); Columbus, Ohio, U.S.
- Listed height: 6 ft 0 in (1.83 m)
- Listed weight: 205 lb (93 kg)

Career information
- College: Ohio State

Career history
- Columbus Tigers (1925); Hocking Valley (1927); Columbus Tigers (1928)

Thomas Noble Long Jr. (August 7, 1899 – July 22, 1969) was an American football player.

Long was born in 1899 in Columbus, Ohio. He attended Ohio State University where he studied mechanical engineering. He played as a guard for the Ohio State Buckeyes football team from 1921 to 1923 and was named to the All-Western football team.

He played professional football as a guard in the National Football League (NFL) for the Columbus Tigers in 1925. He appeared in seven NFL games, one as a starter. He also played for Jim Thorpe's Hocking Valley team of Columbus in 1927. He also played for the Columbus Tigers in 1928, though the Tigers were no longer members of the NFL that year.

Long later worked as an engineer for a gas company. He died in 1969 in Columbus.
