= Mickey MacDonnell =

American football player (1902–1983)

Profile
- Position: Running back

Personal information
- Born: April 30, 1902; Duluth, Minnesota, U.S.
- Died: November 1, 1983 (aged 81); Huntington Beach, California, U.S.

Career information
- College: None

Career history
- 1923, 1925: Duluth Kelleys
- 1925–1930: Chicago Cardinals
- 1931: Frankford Yellow Jackets

Awards and highlights
- Duluth Hall of Fame

Mickey MacDonnell (April 30, 1902 – November 1, 1983) was an American football player who played eight seasons in the National Football League (NFL), mainly for the Chicago Cardinals.
