= Dick Gibson (American football) =

American football player (1900–1968)

Profile
- Positions: Tackle, guard

Personal information
- Born: December 5, 1900; Jefferson County, Kentucky, U.S.
- Died: November 23, 1968 (aged 67); Greenville, Indiana, U.S.
- Listed height: 6 ft 0 in (1.83 m)
- Listed weight: 188 lb (85 kg)

Career information
- High school: Male (KY)
- College: Centre

Career history
- Louisville Brecks (1922–1923)

Career statistics
- Games played: 5
- Games started: 5
- Stats at Pro Football Reference

Richard Marion Gibson (December 5, 1900 – November 23, 1968) was an American football player.

Gibson was born in Jefferson County, Kentucky, in 1900. He attended Louisville Male High School and then enrolled at Centre College. He played college football at Centre where he was one of the stars in the team's line. He left school during the 1922 football season, prior to the team's October 21 loss to Harvard, and joined the Louisville Brecks of the National Football League (NFL). He appeared in two games for the Brecks, both as a starter at the tackle position. In September 1923, Gibson was selected as captain and coach of the 1923 Brecks team. He appeared in three games, all as a starter at tackle and guard during the 1923 season.

Gibson died in 1968 in Greenville, Indiana.
