= Chase Boldt =

American football player (1900–1973)

- Boldt, c. 1958

Profile
- Position: Back

Personal information
- Born: May 7, 1900; Louisville, Kentucky
- Died: May 16, 1973 (aged 73); Louisville, Kentucky
- Listed height: 5 ft 7 in (1.70 m)
- Listed weight: 145 lb (66 kg)

Career information
- High school: Male (KY)

Career history
- Louisville Brecks (1921–1923)

Career statistics
- Games: 8
- Stats at Pro Football Reference

Stephen Chase Boldt (May 7, 1900 – May 16, 1973) was an American football player and career officer in the United States Army.

Boldt was born Louisville, Kentucky, in 1900. He attended Louisville Male High School. When the United States entered World War I, he enlisted in the First Kentucky Infantry and left for Camp Shelby in October 1917. His unit received orders to move up to the front in late 1918, but the Armistice was signed before the unit saw combat.

He played professional football as a back for the Louisville Brecks in the National Football League (NFL). He appeared in eight NFL games, seven as a starter, during the 1921, 1922, and 1923 seasons. He played at the quarterback for the Brecks.

He was a career Army officer, serving for 38 years, including 27 years of active service. He was on a ship heading for the Philippines when Japan attacked Pearl Harbor. His ship immediately rerouted to Pearl Harbor which was still burning when he arrived. During World War II, he initially was in command of the 198th Field Artillery Battalion and was then assigned as chief of staff to the artillery command for the Central Pacific Theater. He attained the rank of colonel before retiring in 1958. He died in 1973 at age 73.
