= Jack Brown (American football) =

American football player (1902–1987)

No. 15, 9, 8
- Positions: Center, guard, tackle

Personal information
- Born: October 24, 1902; Dayton, Ohio, U.S.
- Died: November 25, 1987 (aged 85); Dayton, Ohio, U.S.
- Listed height: 6 ft 0 in (1.83 m)
- Listed weight: 191 lb (87 kg)

Career information
- College: Dayton

Career history
- Dayton Triangles (1926–1929)

Career statistics
- Games: 16

John Roman Brown (October 24, 1902 – November 25, 1987) was an American football player and college athletics administrator. He played college football for the University of Dayton and professional football for the Dayton Triangles. He later served as an administrator of the University of Dayton's athletic department.

== Early life ==
Brown was born in 1902 in Dayton, Ohio. His father, Charles E. Brown, was the superintendent of Triangle Park in Dayton. He played college football at the center position for the University of Dayton. He also a member of the school's rifle team.

== Professional career ==
Brown also played professional football in the National Football League (NFL) as a center, guard, and tackle for the Dayton Triangles. He appeared in 16 NFL games over the course of four seasons from 1926 to 1929.

== Later life ==
After his playing career ended, Brown worked for many years as the business and ticket manager for the University of Dayton athletic department. He became the athletic department's first finance director in 1960 and served in that capacity until 1968. He also became an avid student of Civil War and American history and a collector of related memorabilia.

Brown died in 1987 in Dayton at age 85.
