= Lyle Munn =

American football player (1893–1939)

Profile
- Position: End

Personal information
- Born: April 13, 1902; Fairbury, Nebraska, U.S.
- Died: January 12, 1984 (aged 81); Topeka, Kansas, U.S.
- Listed height: 6 ft 0 in (1.83 m)
- Listed weight: 186 lb (84 kg)

Career information
- College: Kansas State

Career history
- Kansas City Cowboys (1925–1926); Cleveland Bulldogs (1927); Detroit Panthers (1928); New York Giants (1929)

Career NFL statistics
- Games played: 53
- Starts: 44
- Touchdowns: 1
- Stats at Pro Football Reference

Lyle Smith Munn (April 13, 1902 – January 12, 1984) was an American athlete who played professional football for four different teams in the National Football League (NFL) from 1925 through 1929. Munn was a graduate of Kansas State University, for whom he played collegiately.

== Biography ==
Lyle Munn was born April 13, 1902, in Fairbury, Nebraska. He attended Norton County High School in Norton, Kansas, playing tackle on the Norton High football team.

Munn as a Kansas State Aggie in 1923.

Munn enrolled at Kansas State Agricultural College (today's Kansas State University) in 1921, making the freshman football team as an end. This would remain his position throughout his playing career.

In the fall of 1922, Munn was one of 45 Kansas State students to go out for the Aggies' varsity football team. He made the squad, beginning the season as the second team left end. The Aggies would finish the 1922 season with a record of 5–1–2, losing only to a powerhouse Nebraska Cornhuskers team.

He also participated in track and field, throwing the 16-pound shot put for the K State team.

After his time in football, Munn was employed as a civil engineer, working for the Kansas Department of Transportation. He was an assistant construction engineer at the time of his retirement in 1968.

Munn died January 12, 1984, in a hospital at Topeka, Kansas. He was 81 years old at the time of his death. His body was interred at Memorial Park Cemetery in Hutchinson, Kansas.
