= Dick Hudson (American football, born 1898) =

American football player

Profile
- Position: Back

Personal information
- Born: October 7, 1898
- Listed weight: 182 lb (83 kg)

Career history
- Minneapolis Marines (1923); Hammond Pros (1925–1926)

Career statistics
- Games: 8
- Stats at Pro Football Reference

Richard Hudson (October 7, 1898 – ) was an American football player. He played professional football in the National Football League (NFL) as a back for the Minneapolis Marines in 1923 and for the Hammond Pros in 1925 and 1926. He appeared in eight NFL games, seven as a starter. He was sometimes known by the nickname "Super Six", a reference to the Hudson Super Six automobile of the era. He was among the early African Americans to play in the NFL and one of only 13 African-Americans to play in the league prior to World War II. Hudson and one of the other black players, end Ink Williams, both played for Hammond in 1925 and 1926.
