= Peck Reiter =

American football player (1899–1968)

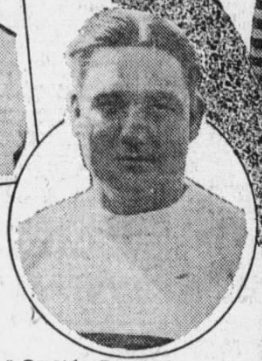
- Reiter, circa 1926

No. 14, 18
- Position: Guard

Personal information
- Born: February 15, 1899; Dayton, Ohio, U.S.
- Died: May 15, 1968 (aged 69); Los Angeles, California, U.S.
- Listed height: 5 ft 9 in (1.75 m)
- Listed weight: 185 lb (84 kg)

Career information
- High school: Steele (Dayton)
- College: Marietta

Career history
- Dayton Triangles (1926–1927)
- Stats at Pro Football Reference

Herbert Gustave "Peck" Reiter (February 15, 1899 – May 15, 1968) was an American professional football guard who played for the Dayton Triangles of the National Football League (NFL). He played college football and basketball for the Miami Redskins and Marietta Pioneers.

== Early life ==
Herbert Gustave Reiter was born on February 15, 1899, in Dayton, Ohio. He was a four-sport "star" at Steele High School in Dayton.

== College career ==
Reiter enrolled at Miami University to play college football and basketball for the Redskins. He was a varsity letterman during the 1918 football season. He earned all-state honors in basketball as a guard during the 1918 season, helping Miami win the state title.

Reiter transferred to Marietta College, where he was a member of the Pioneers football team from 1919 to 1921. He also played basketball for the Pioneers.

== Professional career ==
Reiter started all six league games for the Dayton Triangles of the National Football League (NFL) in 1926 as a guard. The Triangles finished the year with a 1–4–1 NFL record. He appeared in two games, starting one, for the Triangles in 1927.

== Personal life ==
Reiter had a boxing match against Fiddy Wiehl in Marietta, Ohio in March 1922. Reiter won the match. He coached high school football in West Virginia and Bridgeport, Ohio from 1922 to 1926. He later spent many years as a physical education teacher in Ohio. Reiter moved to California in the early 1960s. He died of a heart ailment on May 15, 1968, in the Sherman Oaks neighborhood of Los Angeles, California.
