= John Miller (fullback) =

American football player (1894–1971)

Profile
- Position: Fullback

Personal information
- Born: December 8, 1894; Clinton, Illinois, U.S.
- Died: March 28, 1971 (aged 76); Riverside County, California, U.S.
- Listed height: 6 ft 0 in (1.83 m)
- Listed weight: 188 lb (85 kg)

Career information
- High school: Clinton
- College: Notre Dame

Career history
- Massillon Tigers (1919); Dayton Triangles (1921)

Career statistics
- Games played: 1
- Stats at Pro Football Reference

John Milton Miller (December 8, 1894 – March 28, 1971) was an American football fullback who played one season for the Dayton Triangles of the American Professional Football Association (APFA). He went to college at Notre Dame.

Miller was born on December 8, 1894, in Clinton, Illinois. He went to Clinton High School before attending the University of Notre Dame. He played for their football team, the Fighting Irish, from 1914 to '17. He served in World War I as a Lieutenant from late 1917 to 1918. He also won an athletic competition in 1917. In 1919, he played in one game for the Massillon Tigers of the Ohio League. He did not play in 1920. In 1921, he joined the Dayton Triangles of the newly formed American Professional Football Association (APFA) and appeared in one game. He died on March 28, 1971, in Riverside County, California at the age of 76.
