= Leif Strand =

American football player (1899–1968)

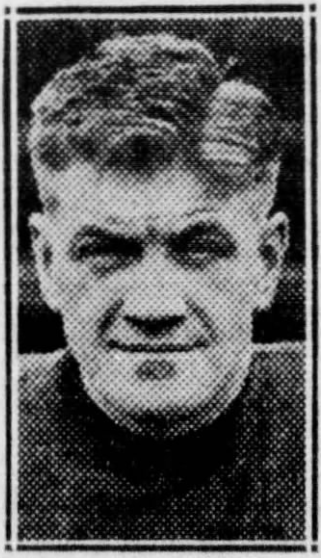
- Strand, c. 1927

Profile
- Positions: Center, middle guard

Personal information
- Born: January 6, 1899; Two Harbors, Minnesota, U.S.
- Died: April 26, 1968 (aged 69); Orlando, Florida, U.S.
- Listed height: 6 ft 0 in (1.83 m)
- Listed weight: 210 lb (95 kg)

Career information
- High school: Two Harbors
- College: Minnesota

Career history
- Duluth Kelleys (1924)
- Stats at Pro Football Reference

Leif Richard Strand (January 6, 1899 – April 26, 1968) was an American football and basketball player. He played college football for the Fordham Maroon and Minnesota Golden Gophers, and college basketball for the Golden Gophers. He played professional football for the Duluth Kelleys of the National Football League (NFL) and professional basketball for a team in Two Harbors, Minnesota.

== Early life ==
Leif Richard Strand was born on January 6, 1899, in Two Harbors, Minnesota. He played high school football and basketball at Two Harbors High School. He served with the American Expeditionary Forces in France during World War I.

== Athletic career ==
=== Fordham University ===
On September 9, 1921, it was reported that Strand had enrolled at Fordham University to play college football. He was a varsity letterman for the Fordham Maroon during the 1921 season. In February 1922, he helped the Two Harbors All Stars win a local professional basketball title. He also played basketball for Two Harbors in 1924.

=== National Football League ===
Strand started all six league games for the Duluth Kelleys of the National Football League (NFL) in 1924 as a center and middle guard.

=== University of Minnesota ===
In 1926, Strand enrolled at the University of Minnesota to play college football for the Golden Gophers. He was on the freshman team in 1925 and a varsity letterman at guard in 1926. His college football eligibility was questioned in 1926 but he was permitted to play after authorities determined that his brother Iver Strand was the Duluth Kelleys player. In mid-October 1926, a cartilage in his knee slipped out of place. He was thought to be lost for the season but returned to the team a week later. He also played college basketball for the Gophers.

=== Skull-fighting ===
In a January 13, 1927, article in the Austin Daily Herald, Strand said he was proficient in the Scandinavian sport of skull-fighting, in which "participants, after becoming fiercely angry at one another glare steadily for about ten seconds, draw in their necks, and then shoot out their heads like a couple of pistons." He declined to exhibit the sport as he could not find anyone to skull-fight. Fellow University of Minnesota athlete Emil Iverson, originally from Denmark, said he had witnessed many skullfights among Scandinavian sailors. Later that month, Strand was challenged by the supposed world head-bumping champion Johnny Carmody, whose manager claimed that the sport originated in Ireland, not Scandinavia. Carmody had supposedly head-bumped in Russia, Japan, Turkey, China, Abyssinia, Kaffirland, and Ireland. Downey said that Carmody had fractured the skull of Matsadu Sorokichi in Tokyo, and broken the neck of the "skull-bumping" champion of Zululand. However, there is no evidence of a world head-bumping champion ever having existed.

Bud Jenkins, the claimed Pennsylvania champion, challenged Carmody in January 1927. Jenkins' manager, J. V. Hannigan stated "I have affidavits from eminent specialists claiming my man has the thickest skull in America." Jenkins said the "sport" was of Welsh origin.

=== Retirement ===
In March 1927, Strand was banned by the Big Ten Conference after it was discovered that his brother Iver had died in 1922 and that Leif had played for the Kelleys in 1924. Strand said he was only paid for expenses and just played for fun. He was summoned to stand before the University of Minnesota senate committee on March 21, 1927. In May 1927, it was reported that his eligibility had still not been decided by the Big Ten Conference. On July 12, 1927, Strand announced that he would not be returning to the Golden Gophers for the 1927 season, instead deciding to focus full-time on dentistry.

== Later life ==
Strand graduated from the University of Minnesota Dental School in 1929. He was a dentist in Minneapolis until retiring in 1966. In June 1957, he was named the president of the University of Minnesota Alumni association. He lived in Edina, Minnesota, in his later years. He died on April 26, 1968, in Orlando, Florida.
