= Paul Henry Allen Lynch =

Paul Henry Allen Lynch was a multiple Guinness World Record holder through the 1980s, and 1990s. Paul was best known for his previous world records in push-ups, and most notably consecutive one-finger push-ups.

== Records ==
One-Arm Push-Ups

Paul's first world record happened in 1982, June 10, when Paul accomplished 760 one-armed push-ups at the YMCA, Wimbledon, Greater London, at the age of 27 years. As an effect Paul's record appeared in the, 1983 - Guinness Book of Records.

Paul's second world record occurred in 1983, July 10, when Paul accomplished 1,753 one-armed push-ups at the Wimbledon YMCA, London.

One-Finger Push-Ups

The One-Finger push-up is done with just one finger of one arm only, and must be done consecutively with no breaks. The back must remain straight, and the elbow must make a 90 degree angle to mark each successful push-up. However, Guinness does allow the one-finger to be performed on the knuckle of the finger being used (Paul used his fully extended finger). The One-Finger can be subjectively argued as the hardest push-up in the Guinness category, as most Guinness push-ups are well with the thousands.

The Pioneer of the first documented one finger push-up can be credited to Mich (Michael Gooch) who in 1982, March 20 achieved 39 one finger push-ups during the Kyokushinkai European Championships (Karate Championships) at Wembley Arena, London UK. Soon after, Mich Gooch, broke his record achieving 45 one-finger push-ups to become the first Guinness World Record Holder in the one-finger in 1985.

The Attempt

On 21 April 1992 at London's Hippodrome, Lynch performed 124 consecutive one-finger push-ups over approximately 5 minutes, during what would have been his 125th push-up, Paul shattered the bones in his finger.

After the attempt, Lynch was quoted as saying, "It felt like sticking my finger in an electrical socket."

Guinness no longer publicizes the consecutive one-finger push-up, rather a new category of most one-finger in 30 seconds has been introduced.
