= Harry Malcolm =

American football player (1905–1987)

Profile
- Position: G/T

Personal information
- Born: November 25, 1905; Indiana County, Pennsylvania, U.S.
- Died: September 15, 1987 (aged 81); Upland, Pennsylvania
- Listed height: 6 ft 0 in (1.83 m)
- Listed weight: 195 lb (88 kg)

Career information
- College: Washington & Jefferson College, Indiana University of Pennsylvania

Career history
- Frankford Yellow Jackets (1929)
- Stats at Pro Football Reference

Harry Elmer Malcolm (November 25, 1905 – September 15, 1987) was an American professional football player for the Frankford Yellow Jackets. He attended Washington & Jefferson College and the Indiana University of Pennsylvania.

== See also ==
- 1929 Frankford Yellow Jackets season
