= Buck Gavin =

American football player (1891–1943)

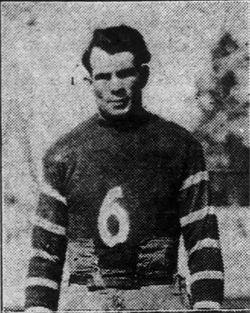
- Gavin with the Rock Island Independents

No. 2, 3, 6, 10
- Position: Running back

Personal information
- Born: June 8, 1891; Spring Valley, Illinois, U.S.
- Died: October 14, 1943 (aged 52); Chicago, Illinois, U.S.
- Listed height: 5 ft 10 in (1.78 m)
- Listed weight: 179 lb (81 kg)

Career information
- College: None

Career history
- 1920, 1922: Buffalo
- 1921: Detroit
- 1921, 1922, 1924–1925: Rock Island Independents
- 1923: Green Bay Packers
- 1926: Hammond Pros

Career statistics
- Games played: 47
- Starts: 39
- Touchdowns: 13

Patrick James "Buck" Gavin (June 8, 1891 – October 14, 1943) was an American professional football player who was a fullback for seven seasons for the Buffalo All-Americans, Detroit Tigers, Rock Island Independents, Green Bay Packers, and Hammond Pros. After his retirement, he became a plumbing inspector in Chicago and made local headlines after a woman was found dead in his Chicago apartment in 1931. Although he was initially convicted of the crime, he was let go with no bail and never faced any formal charges. He later died of heart disease in 1943.
