= Roger Mahoney =

American football player (1906–1981)

Profile
- Positions: Center, guard, end

Personal information
- Born: July 19, 1906; Philadelphia
- Died: March 12, 1981 (aged 74); Reading, Pennsylvania
- Listed height: 6 ft 0 in (1.83 m)
- Listed weight: 205 lb (93 kg)

Career information
- High school: Northeast (PA)
- College: Penn State

Career history
- Frankford Yellow Jackets (1928-1930); Minneapolis Red Jackets (1930)
- Stats at Pro Football Reference

Roger Sylvis Mahoney (July 19, 1906 – March 12, 1981) was an American football player. He played college football for Penn State and in the National Football League (NFL) as a center, guard and end for the Frankford Yellow Jackets (1928–1930) and Minneapolis Red Jackets (1930). He appeared in 42 NFL games, 30 as a starter.
