= Tiny Ladson =

American football player (1896–1934)

Profile
- Position: Guard

Personal information
- Born: October 2, 1896; Sullivan, Indiana, US
- Died: April 16, 1934 (aged 37); Sullivan, Indiana, US
- Listed weight: 254 lb (115 kg)

Career history
- Evansville Crimson Giants (1922)

Career NFL statistics
- Games started: 3
- Games played: 3
- Stats at Pro Football Reference

Glessie Mitchell "Tiny" Ladson (October 2, 1896 - April 16, 1934) was a professional American football guard in the National Football League (NFL). He played with the Evansville Crimson Giants in 1922.
