= George Barna (American football) =

American football and lacrosse player (1908–1972)

Profile
- Position: End

Personal information
- Born: March 23, 1908; Clifton, New Jersey, U.S.
- Died: November 24, 1972 (aged 64); Royalton, New York, U.S.
- Listed height: 6 ft 1 in (1.85 m)
- Listed weight: 198 lb (90 kg)

Career information
- High school: Somerville (NJ)
- College: Hobart College

Career history
- Frankford Yellow Jackets (1929)

Career statistics
- Games: 17

George J. Barna (March 23, 1908 – November 24, 1972) was an American football and lacrosse player. He played college football and lacrosse at Hobart College and professional football in the National Football League for the Frankford Yellow Jackets in 1929.

== Early life and college ==
Barna was born in 1908 in Clifton, New Jersey. He attended Clifton High School where he was captain of the football team as a senior.

He enrolled at Hobart College where he played college football from 1925 to 1928. At the end of the 1927 season, he was selected as captain of Hobart's 1928 team. He was also named to the Syracuse all-opponent team. Hobart's trainer remembered him as "the best defensive player I ever saw" and one who played without a helmet or padding of any kind. He was also an All-American lacrosse player.

== Professional football ==
He played professional football in the National Football League (NFL) as an end for the Frankford Yellow Jackets during the 1929 season. He appeared in 17 NFL games, 13 as a starter, and scored one touchdown. His wife later recalled that Barna received $35 a game "for just playing the game he loved."

== Later life ==
After retiring from football, Barna taught social studies for 36 years from 1930 until his retirement in 1965. He taught for one-and-a-half years at East Rochester High School and approximately 34 years at Kenmore High School. He died in November 1972 at age 64. His body was discovered in the woods where he had been hunting deer. It was believed that Barna suffered a heart attack.
