= Austin Brucklacher =

American football player (1898–1941)

No. 5, 3
- Position: Guard

Personal information
- Born: April 12, 1898; Louisville, Kentucky
- Died: January 7, 1941 (aged 42); Louisville, Kentucky
- Listed weight: 193 lb (88 kg)

Career history
- Louisville Brecks (1921–1923)

Career statistics
- Games played: 7
- Games started: 5
- Stats at Pro Football Reference

Henry Austin Brucklacher (April 12, 1898 – January 7, 1941) was an American professional football guard who played three seasons with the Louisville Brecks of the National Football League (NFL).

== Early life ==
Henry Austin Brucklacher was born on April 12, 1898, in Louisville, Kentucky. He did not play college football.

== Professional career ==
Brucklacher signed with the Louisville Brecks of the American Professional Football Association in 1921. He played in one game, a start, for the Brecks during the 1921 season. He appeared in four games, starting two, for the Brecks in 1922 in the newly renamed National Football League (NFL). Brucklacher wore jersey number 5 during the 1922 season. He played in two games, both starts, in 1923 and wore number 3. He weighed 193 pounds during his NFL career and was listed as a guard.

== Personal life ==
Brucklacher died on January 7, 1941, in Louisville. His name is sometimes misspelled as "Brunklacher".
