= George Dahlgren =

American football player (1887–1940)

No. 8
- Positions: Guard, Tackle

Personal information
- Born: April 17, 1887; La Crosse, Wisconsin, United States
- Died: January 16, 1940 (aged 52); Chicago, Illinois, United States
- Listed height: 5 ft 10 in (1.78 m)
- Listed weight: 200 lb (91 kg)

Career history
- Kenosha Maroons (1924); Hammond Pros (1925); Rock Island Independents (1925); Hammond Pros (1926)
- Stats at Pro Football Reference

George Arthur Dahlgren (April 17, 1887 – January 16, 1940) was a football player in the National Football League.

Dahlgren was born in La Crosse, Wisconsin. He was the eldest son of Edwin Dahlgren, who was born in Sweden, and Pauline, who was an immigrant from Norway. He played at the collegiate level at Beloit College and the University of Wisconsin–La Crosse. Dahlgren played for the Kenosha Maroons, Rock Island Independents and the Hammond Pros from 1924 to 1926 as a guard and tackle.

Outside of playing football, Dahlgren also coached the freshmen football and basketball teams at Beliot. Dahlgren also set the Wisconsin state record in the hammer throw.
