= Proc Randels =

American football player (1900–1933)

No. 13
- Position: End

Personal information
- Born: August 5, 1900; Anthony, Kansas
- Died: January 17, 1933 (aged 32); Salt Lake City, Utah
- Listed height: 6 ft 0 in (1.83 m)
- Listed weight: 180 lb (82 kg)

Career information
- High school: Chaparral (Anthony, Kansas)
- College: Kansas State

Career history
- Kansas City Cowboys (1926); Cleveland Bulldogs (1927); Detroit Wolverines (1928)

Awards and highlights
- Al Demaree second team All-American (1925)
- Stats at Pro Football Reference

Horace Malvern "Proc" Randels (August 5, 1900 – January 17, 1933) was an American football end who played three seasons in the National Football League with the Kansas City Cowboys, the Cleveland Bulldogs, and the Detroit Wolverines. He played college football at Kansas State.

== Early life ==
Horace Malvern Randels was born on August 5, 1900, in Anthony, Kansas, to James Bennett Randels and Florence May Coulson Randels. He attended Chaparral High School in Anthony, where he played high school football.

== College career ==
Randels played college football at Kansas State University, then known as Kansas State Agricultural College. His nickname of "Proc" originated during his time at Kansas State, and he was also referred to as "Young Chief" while on the team.

Randels' first stint on the Kansas State football team was from 1918 to 1920, during which he played under coach Zora Clevenger. He left the team after 1920, but returned in 1925 to play one final season of college football under coach Charlie Bachman. That season, Randels made second team All-American.

== NFL career ==
=== Kansas City Cowboys ===
Randels played with the Kansas City Cowboys in 1926, the team's final season. He started all eleven games at left end.

=== Cleveland Bulldogs ===
Following the 1926 season, the Cowboys merged with the Cleveland Bulldogs, and Randels followed the team to play with them for their final season in 1927. In six games with three starts, he recorded two receptions for 67 yards and one touchdown. He also recorded one rushing touchdown.

In the first quarter of a November 13, 1927 game against the Frankford Yellow Jackets, Randels blocked a punt, scoring a safety for the Bulldogs. The game was a 37–0 blowout win for Cleveland.

=== Detroit Wolverines ===
In 1928, the Bulldogs relocated to Detroit and were renamed the Wolverines, after Michigan's college football team. Randels played ten games with the Wolverines with three starts, and made four receptions for 75 yards and one touchdown.

== Later life and death ==
In the years following his NFL career, Randels remained in Detroit, where he worked for an automobile finance company. In 1930, he married Ione Dull, with whom he had two children. In June 1932, the family moved to a ranch near Butlerville, Utah, southeast of Salt Lake City, which directly adjoined the ranch of Ione's father, Dr. Lafayette Jackson Dull, a 72-year-old retired dentist.

On the evening of January 17, 1933, Dr. Dull called the Randels home to ask for eggs and milk, but Randels refused to give him the amount he asked for, causing Dull to become enraged and shout at Randels over the phone, "I'll get you." Later that evening, around 6:30 p.m., Proc and Ione Randels went to the Dull house to help care for Junior Dull, Ione's 12-year-old brother, who was ill. They brought two eggs with them, which displeased Dr. Dull, who then suddenly shot Randels in the back in the presence of his young nephew. Randels attempted to defend himself by pushing Dull into a chair, which caused the revolver to go off again and shoot Randels in the chest.

Randels died almost immediately due to the bullet wounds in his back and chest. His body was taken back to Anthony for burial on January 20.

Ione Randels was the primary witness out of six that testified against her father in his trial. He pled not guilty to the charge of first-degree murder, and was charged with second-degree murder and initially sentenced to 20 years in prison. However, given Dull's history of poorly controlled emotional outbursts that had affected his dentistry career and family life, he was later declared insane and moved to the Utah State Mental Hospital. He died there in 1934, after about a year at the hospital.
