= Johnny Shultz =

American football player (1909–1932)

Profile
- Position: Fullback

Personal information
- Born: ca. 1909
- Died: November 28, 1932; Ashland, Pennsylvania, U.S.
- Listed height: 6 ft 1 in (1.85 m)
- Listed weight: 189 lb (86 kg)

Career information
- High school: Pen Argyl (PA)
- College: Temple

Career history
- Frankford Yellow Jackets (1930)
- Stats at Pro Football Reference

John H. "Shebo" Shultz (c. 1909 – November 28, 1932) was an American football player.

Shultz attended Pen Argyl High School in eastern Pennsylvania. He played college football for Temple from 1927 to 1929. As a senior in 1929, he converted on 48 of 52 runs for first down. While playing for Temple, The Philadelphia Inquirer described him as Temple's best defensive back and a "star of the first order."

He also played professional football in the National Football League (NFL) as a fullback for the Frankford Yellow Jackets in 1930. He appeared in six NFL games, one as a starter.

Shultz later became coach of the undefeated Ashland High School football team. He died in an automobile crash in November 1932. He was buried at St. Elizabeth's Cemetery in Pen Argyl, Pennsylvania.
