= John Layport =

American football player (1901–1986)

- John Layport, 1922

Profile
- Positions: Guard, tackle

Personal information
- Born: March 19, 1901; Pataskala, Ohio, U.S.
- Died: November 4, 1986 (aged 85); Hendersonville, North Carolina, U.S.
- Listed height: 5 ft 9 in (1.75 m)
- Listed weight: 170 lb (77 kg)

Career information
- High school: East (OH), Loveland (CO)
- College: Wooster

Career history
- Columbus Tigers (1924); Dayton Triangles (1925–1926)

John Evans Layport (March 19, 1901 – November 4, 1986) was an American football player.

Layport was born in 1901 in Pataskala, Ohio, and attended East High School in Cincinnati and Loveland High School. He played college football for Wooster College from 1920 to 1922 as a guard and was the captain of the 1922 Wooster football team. His brothers, Herbert and Charles Layport, also played for Wooster's football team.

Layport also played in the National Football League (NFL) for the Columbus Tigers in 1924 and the Dayton Triangles in 1925 and 1926. He appeared in 13 NFL games.

He served in the Army during World War II and worked as a traffic department executive from AT&T. After retiring from AT&T, he moved to Virginia. He was married to Marguerite LaPorte, an opera singer. He died in 1986 in Hendersonville, North Carolina.
