= KORL =

KORL may refer to:

- KORL-FM, a radio station (101.1 FM) licensed to serve Waianae, Hawaii, United States
- KORL (AM), a defunct radio station (1180 AM) formerly licensed to serve Honolulu, Hawaii
- Orlando Executive Airport (ICAO code KORL)
