= Wilkie Moody =

American football player (1897–1976)

Wilkie Osgood Moody (May 12, 1897, in Irabo, Congo Free State – February 22, 1976) was an American football player in the American Professional Football Association. The son of missionary parents, he is distinguished as being the first African-born player to play in the league that became the National Football League. He served in the US Army in World War I.

He played wingback for the Columbus Panhandles.
