= Elliott Bonowitz =

American football and basketball player (1902–1966)

Profile
- Positions: Guard, end, tackle, back

Personal information
- Born: May 7, 1902; Columbus, Ohio, U.S.
- Died: August 24, 1966 (aged 64); Columbus, Ohio, U.S.
- Listed height: 6 ft 1 in (1.85 m)
- Listed weight: 190 lb (86 kg)

Career information
- College: Wilmington

Career history
- Columbus Tigers (1923); Dayton Triangles (1924–1925)
- Stats at Pro Football Reference

Elliott Bonowitz (May 7, 1902 – August 24, 1966) was an American football and basketball player. He played professional football in the National Football League (NFL) from 1923 to 1925, appearing in 20 NFL games, 10 as a starter.

== Early years and Wilmington College ==
Borowitz was born in 1902 in Columbus, Ohio. He attended Wilmington College in Wilmington, Ohio. He was Wilmington' basketball star in 1922, described as "a fast scorer" and "big enough to jump with any center on any team and not get the worst of it." He also played college football at Wilmington. He was regarded as one of the all-time great athletes at Wilmington College.

== Professional football and basketball ==
In early 1923, Bonowitz joined the Columbus Mendels basketball team.

In the fall of 1923, Bonowitz played professional football in the National Football League (NFL) for the Columbus Tigers in 1923. He appeared in six games for the Tigers, playing at the back guard, and tackle positions.

He continued to play football in the NFL, playing for the Dayton Triangles from 1924 to 1925. He appeared in 14 games with the Triangles, 10 as a starter. He played at the guard and end positions at Dayton. In all, Bonowitz appeared in 20 NFL games.

In February 1926, after recovering from a knee injury sustained while playing football, he signed to play basketball for the Niehuas and Dohse club.

== Family and later years ==
Bonowitz later had his name legally changed to "Bonnie". He married Margaret Burris and three sons. Two of his sons, twins David and Dale Bonnie, played college football for Ohio State. After retiring from football, he worked as a national sales supervisor for National Linen Service Industries. He died in 1966 at age 64.
