= Linsly School =

The Linsly School
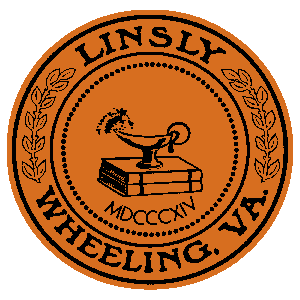

Location
- 60 Knox Lane; Wheeling, West Virginia 26003; United States
- Coordinates: 40°04′23″N 80°41′44″W

Information
- Former name: Lancastrian Academy (1814–1877); Linsly Military Institute (1877–1978)
- Type: Independent college-preparatory boarding & day school
- Motto: Forward and No Retreat
- Religious affiliation: Nonsectarian
- Established: 1814; 212 years ago
- Founder: Noah Linsly
- Status: Currently operational
- Trust: Board of Trustees
- CEEB code: 491410
- NCES School ID: 01489745
- Chair: John Holloway
- Head of school: Justin Zimmerman
- Faculty: 41.9 (FTE)
- Grades: 5–12
- Gender: Coeducational
- Enrollment: 431 (2017–2018)
  - Grade 5: 25
  - Grade 6: 36
  - Grade 7: 50
  - Grade 8: 42
  - Grade 9: 65
  - Grade 10: 76
  - Grade 11: 71
  - Grade 12: 66
- Average class size: 10
- Student to teacher ratio: 10.3:1
- Hours in school day: 7
- Campus: 18 buildings, including 4 dormitories
- Campus size: 57 acres (23 ha)
- Campus type: Urban
- Colors: Orange & Black
- Slogan: Learn Lead Live
- Song: The Linsly Alma Mater
- Athletics: 20 interscholastic teams
- Athletics conference: OVAC
- Nickname: Cadets
- Rival: Wheeling Central Catholic High School
- Accreditation: NCA
- Publication: Linsly Today
- Newspaper: The Linsly Line
- Endowment: $31.47 million
- School fees: $500–1,500
- Annual tuition: High school $42,740 (boarding) $19,850 (day); Middle School $40,740 (boarding) $17,850 (day)
- Revenue: $14.89 million
- Affiliations: NAIS, TABS, & PCACAC
- Website: linsly.org

The Linsly School, formerly known as the Linsly Military Institute, is a boarding and day school located in Wheeling, West Virginia. It was founded in 1814 by Noah Linsly and chartered by the State of Virginia in the same year. The school is the oldest preparatory school west of the Alleghenies. It was originally known as the Lancastrian Academy.

== History ==
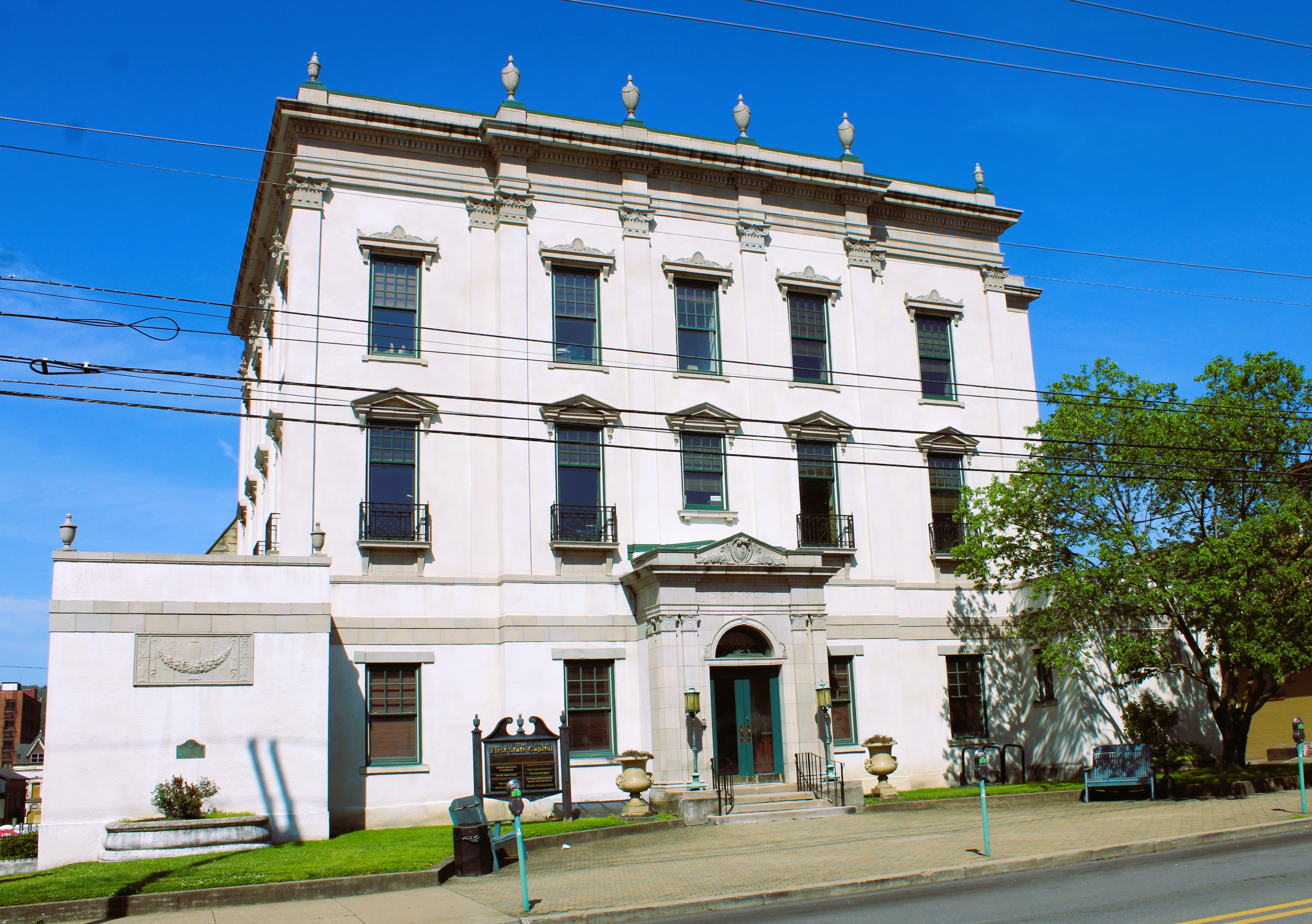
Linsly Institute building in 2023

Upon Noah Linsly's death in 1814, his will provided money for the establishment of a Lancastrian Academy in Wheeling, Virginia. In 1877, the Academy, located in the then newly-formed state of West Virginia, was renamed the Linsly Military Institute in honor of its founding benefactor. In July 1979 (between academic years), the school switched from a military-structured school to a traditional boys' preparatory school, and was renamed The Linsly School.

The school's first location was in downtown Wheeling, purchased with the sale of two farms that Noah Linsly had left to the Lancastrian Academy. The second building was in downtown Wheeling, Va. This building was used as a temporary statehouse when West Virginia became a state. The building is known as the First State Capitol. The third school building was located on National Road in the Woodsdale section of Wheeling. It was built in 1925 and officially named Thedah Place but was known as Old Main. Linsly owned property across the creek from this building, where the dormitories were (and still are) located. The current school building was built as an extension of the Paul Gym in 1966 with a donation from Sophie Banes and is known as Banes Hall.

Louis Bennett Jr. never attended Linsly but is memorialized by a statue, "The Aviator", outside of Banes Hall, one of 7 that his mother commissioned in his honor. Bennett joined the Royal Flying Corps in World War I and defeated enough German aircraft to become an ace before being shot down over France. Along with the statue, Sallie Maxwell Bennett also had a window inside Westminster Abbey created.

Louis Bennett, Jr. spent much time in Wheeling during his youth, so when his mother's request to put the aviator statue in Washington, D.C., failed, she turned to Wheeling, where he had developed his love for aviation. After speaking with people in Wheeling, someone suggested that Linsly might be interested in hosting the statue. Linsly accepted, and the Aviator is now a Linsly icon. In 1927, Charles Lindbergh visited the statue and placed a wreath at the foot of the Aviator.

Linsly originally enrolled both girls and boys. The Lancastrian Academy system required older students to reinforce their education by mentoring their younger peers. In 1861, during the American Civil War, Linsly became an all-boys school. In 1876, Linsly became a military institute under Headmaster John Burch and would continue to be so for the next 102 years. In 1979, Headmaster Reno Diorio transitioned Linsly to a traditional college preparatory school format. Then in 1988, Diorio led Linsly back to being a co-educational school, as it once had been.

The Linsly Extravaganza, formerly known as the Minstrel, is a tradition begun in 1939 by Douglas Haigwood. The Extravaganza has allowed Linsly students to perform on stage for over 80 years.

The Linsly Alma Mater was used for decades but fell into disuse:

All Hail Alma Mater, Thy Children Call. Mighty Thy Power, Dearest Friend To All. Sing For Dear Old Linsly, Sing For Loyalty Strong. All Hail Alma Mater, Linsly Hear Our Song.

== The Linsly School Today ==
In 2007, Linsly ranged from 5th to 12th grade with a student body of about 420.

In the 2023-2024 school year, the school enrolled 449 students in grades 5–12.

In celebration of Linsly's 200th academic year, the school campaigned to raise $10,000,000 for an addition to Banes Hall, the main academic building, renovations to many other on-campus facilities, and enriching Linsly's instructing capability.

As of 2024, Linsly had a 100% college acceptance rate for its graduating seniors.

As a day and boarding school, Linsly is home to international students from many countries, including China, Finland, Canada, South Korea, Spain, Argentina, Costa Rica, Germany, Italy, Serbia, Brazil, and Japan.

== Notable alumni ==
- Carl G. Bachmann 1908, Member of the U.S. House of Representatives
- Ashley Battle 2000, WNBA player for the New York Liberty
- Max Baer (judge) Chief Justice of the Pennsylvania Supreme Court
- Bill Berrehsem, professional American football player
- Jack Canfield 1962, Author of the Chicken Soup for the Soul book series
- Willie Clay 1988, NFL football player and sports commentator
- Eddie Drummond 1998, NFL football player
- C. J. Goodwin 2008, NFL football player and philanthropist
- Heath Haynes 1987, MLB baseball player
- Jon Robert Holden 1994, former professional basketball player
- Tom Keane 1944, NFL football player and coach
- Chris Stirewalt, digital politics editor for the Fox News Channel
- Robert E. L. Strider, president of Colby College
- Jason Wilson (politician) 1987, Member of the Ohio Senate
- Glenn Elliott Mayor of Wheeling

== Notable staff ==
- Eugene Lamone, former football coach
- Skip Prosser, former basketball coach (1977–1979)

== Sources ==
- Official website
- The Association of Boarding Schools profile
