= Bill Springsteen =

American football player (1899–1985)

Profile
- Position: Center / End

Personal information
- Born: October 27, 1899; New York City, U.S.
- Died: October 1, 1985 (aged 85); Lakeville, Connecticut, U.S.
- Listed height: 6 ft 0 in (1.83 m)
- Listed weight: 200 lb (91 kg)

Career information
- High school: Detroit (MI) Northwestern
- College: Lehigh

Career history
- Frankford Yellow Jackets (1925–1926); Chicago Cardinals (1927–1928)

Awards and highlights
- NFL champion (1926)
- Stats at Pro Football Reference

William Watson Springsteen (October 27, 1899 – October 1, 1985) was a professional football player for the National Football League (NFL)'s Frankford Yellow Jackets from 1925 until 1926. He won the 1926 NFL championship with the Yellow Jackets. He then played for the Chicago Cardinals during the 1927 and 1928 seasons. He attended Northwestern High School, located in Detroit, Michigan.

On December 8, 1923, during his junior year of college, Springsteen was elected captain of the Lehigh University football team.
