= Joe Wostoupal =

American football player (1903–1966)

Profile
- Position: Center

Personal information
- Born: January 1, 1903; West Point, Nebraska, U.S.
- Died: July 31, 1966 (aged 63)
- Listed height: 6 ft 3 in (1.91 m)
- Listed weight: 208 lb (94 kg)

Career information
- College: Nebraska

Career history
- Kansas City Cowboys (1926); Detroit Panthers (1928); New York Giants (1928–1930)
- Stats at Pro Football Reference

Joseph Wostoupal Jr. (January 1, 1903 – July 31, 1966) was an American professional football player who played offensive lineman for four seasons for the Kansas City Cowboys, Detroit Panthers, and New York Giants.
