= Eddie Bollinger =

American football player (1906–1984)

- Eddie Bollinger, 1929

Profile
- Position: Tackle

Personal information
- Born: July 9, 1906; Westmoreland County, Pennsylvania
- Died: July 14, 1984 (aged 78); Lancaster, Pennsylvania
- Listed height: 6 ft 1 in (1.85 m)
- Listed weight: 215 lb (98 kg)

Career information
- High school: Youngwood (PA)
- College: Bucknell

Career history
- Frankford Yellow Jackets (1930); Eighth Ward A. A. (1931)
- Stats at Pro Football Reference

Edward Ebbert Bollinger (July 9, 1906 – July 14, 1984) was an American football player.

Bollinger was born in 1906 in Huntingdon Township, Westmoreland County, Pennsylvania. He attended Youngwood High School, Pennsylvania State University, and Bucknell University. He played college football at Bucknell from 1926 to 1929 and was an All-American there.

He played professional football in the National Football League (NFL) as a tackle for the Frankford Yellow Jackets in 1930. He appeared in four NFL games, two as a starter. In 1931, he was the captain of the Eighth Ward A. A. football team. He was selected by the Lancaster New Era as a first-team tackle on its 1931 all-star football team. He played for the Maple Grove A. A. in 1932. In 1934, he announced his retirement as a football player.

After his football career ended, Bollinger worked for Armstrong World Industries for more than 36 years. While working for Armstrong, he invented a device for use in connection with a lift truck in transporting heavy loads. He retired in 1971. As a retiree, he operated a woodworking shop and crafts museum in Lancaster County, Pennsylvania. He died in 1984 at age 78 at Lancaster General Hospital in Lancaster, Pennsylvania.
