= Pascal Giugliano =

American football player (1900–1976)

Profile
- Position: Back

Personal information
- Born: December 11, 1900; Louisville, Kentucky, U.S.
- Died: May 1, 1976 (aged 75); Louisville, Kentucky, U.S.
- Listed height: 5 ft 4 in (1.63 m)
- Listed weight: 140 lb (64 kg)

Career information
- High school: Louisville Male (KY)

Career history
- Louisville Brecks (1923)

Career statistics
- Games: 1
- Stats at Pro Football Reference

Pascal Raphael "Patsy" Giugliano (December 11, 1900 – May 1, 1976) was an American football player.

Giugliano was born in 1900 in Louisville, Kentucky. He attended du Pont Manual Training High School where he was quarterback on the football team.

Giugliano played professional football as a back for the Louisville Brecks in the National Football League (NFL). He appeared in one NFL game during the 1923 season. He later worked as a promotional man for a circus.

Giugliano later worked as a promotional man for a circus. He died in 1976 at age 75.
