= Neil Rengel =

American football and baseball player (1906–1995)

Profile
- Position: Fullback

Personal information
- Born: April 9, 1906; St. Cloud, Minnesota
- Died: January 14, 1995 (aged 88); Sauk Rapids, Minnesota
- Listed height: 5 ft 9 in (1.75 m)
- Listed weight: 205 lb (93 kg)

Career information
- High school: Technical (MN)
- College: Minnesota, St. Cloud Teachers, Davis & Elkins

Career history
- Frankford Yellow Jackets (1930)
- Stats at Pro Football Reference

Neil Albert Rengel (April 9, 1906 – January 14, 1995) was an American football and baseball player.

== Early life ==
Rengel was born in 1906 in St. Cloud, Minnesota, and attended Technical High School in that city. He began his college career at the University of Minnesota where he played for the football team. In 1924, he transferred to St. Cloud Teachers College where he played for the football team. He later attended Davis & Elkins College in West Virginia, starring for the Davis & Elkins football team in 1928 and 1929. He was selected as a third-team halfback on the 1928 college football All-America team. He was known as "Five Yard Rengel" for his rushing prowess and also won a reputation as "one of the greatest pass heavers of all time."

== Professional football and baseball ==
Rengel played professional football in the National Football League (NFL) as a fullback for the Frankford Yellow Jackets in 1930. He appeared in 11 NFL games, four as a starter.

He also played baseball as a pitcher. His baseball career included stints with the St. Cloud Saints, Eagles, and semi-pros. He threw a no-hitter on June 24, 1934.

== Family and later years ==
Rengel married Ermelda "Billie" Pattock in 1934. They had five daughters and three sons. After his playing career ended, he coached football at Cathedral High School and St. Cloud State. He also worked for Nash Finch and the Johnston Chocolate Co. He was inducted into the Technical High School Athletic Hall of Fame and the Davis & Elkins Athletic Hall of Fame.
