= Ben Whaley =

American football player, sports coach (1926–2001)

Biographical details
- Born: October 14, 1926; Richmond, Virginia, U.S.
- Died: November 4, 2001 (aged 75); Richmond, Virginia, U.S.

Playing career

Football
- 1944: Virginia State
- 1946–1948: Virginia State
- 1949: Los Angeles Dons
- Positions: Tackle, guard

Coaching career (HC unless noted)

Football
- ?–1953: North Carolina College (line)
- 1954–1956: Hampton (assistant)
- 1957–1964: Hampton

Basketball
- 1954–1957: Hampton

Baseball
- ?–1954: North Carolina College
- 1958–1966: Hampton

Head coaching record
- Overall: 34–38–1 (football); 20–49 (basketball, Hampton only)

Benjamin Franklyn Whaley (October 14, 1926 – November 4, 2001) was an American college football, college basketball, and college baseball coach and professional football player. He served as the head football coach at Hampton Institute—now known as Hampton University—from 1957 to 1964, compiling a record of 34–38–1.

== Head coaching record ==
=== Football ===
Year	Team	Overall	Conference	Standing	Bowl/playoffs
Hampton Pirates (Central Intercollegiate Athletic Association) (1957–1964)
1957	Hampton	4–5	4–5	12th	
1958	Hampton	7–3	6–3	10th	
1959	Hampton	4–4–1	4–4	10th	
1960	Hampton	5–4	5–2	5th	
1961	Hampton	6–3	3–3	10th	
1962	Hampton	3–6	2–4	14th	
1963	Hampton	4–5	2–5	13th	
1964	Hampton	1–8	0–7	18th	
Hampton:		34–38–1	26–33		
Total:		34–38–1			
