= Hi Brigham =

American football player (1892–1987)

Haven Brigham
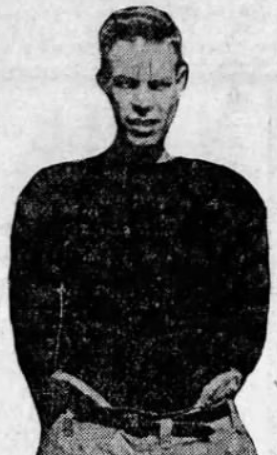
- Brigham in 1920

No. 12
- Positions: Center, Guard, End

Personal information
- Born: July 13, 1892; Toledo, Ohio, U.S.
- Died: October 6, 1987 (aged 95); Toledo, Ohio, U.S.
- Listed height: 5 ft 11 in (1.80 m)
- Listed weight: 185 lb (84 kg)

Career information
- High school: Bowling Green (OH)
- College: Ohio State

Career history
- Columbus Panhandles (1913–1920)

Career statistics
- Games played: 3
- Games started: 1
- Stats at Pro Football Reference

Haven Alva "Hi" Brigham (July 13, 1892 – October 6, 1987) was an American football lineman who played eight seasons with the Columbus Panhandles, including one while they were in the National Football League (NFL).

== Early life and education ==
Brigham was born on July 13, 1892, in Toledo, Ohio. He was one of four children. His family moved to Bowling Green, Ohio, shortly after his birth. He was nicknamed "Hi" when he was young. He did not play high school football until his senior year of high school, after several friends suggested he try out for the team. His coach, Jim Lehmann, gave him the center position. He also played fullback, and scored his only touchdown in a 111–0 win over North Baltimore High School. He attended college at Ohio State University, studying horticulture. He enrolled in fall of 1910, playing for the school's freshman team. While at Ohio State, Brigham met a clerk from Fahrney Tailors, who asked him if he was interested in playing professional football. He played a few games for the team, getting paid ten dollars per game, before being caught by OSU. He was caught when Lynn St. John, the Ohio State athletic director, refereed a game that he was playing in. St. John recognized Brigham and gave him an ultimatum the next day. "He told me to make up my mind. Either it was going to be football with OSU or the professional ranks. I was young then and the money was too good to pass up," Brigham later said.

== Professional career ==
He played with the team until the 1913 season, being considered one of the best in Ohio. He was then recruited by Joseph Carr, the owner of the Ohio League Columbus Panhandles, to play for his team. Carr gave Brigham an offer of 20 dollars per game, and a job at a local railroad station with a salary of 75 dollars a month. He accepted the offer, and ended up playing eight seasons with the team. By 1915 he had become one of the team's top players, starting nearly every game of the season at center. However, near the end of the 1915 season, Brigham nearly lost his life. While chasing a Columbus Barracks player, Brigham fell out of bounds on an iron water bucket. He finished the game, but soon afterwards experienced pain and went to the hospital. He was diagnosed with a ruptured spleen and given a small chance to live. He was described by The Columbus Dispatch as "near death", but recovered and played five more seasons. He retired in 1921, after playing three games in the inaugural National Football League (NFL) season.

== Later life ==
After retiring from sports, Brigham worked at his family's greenhouse before opening a collectibles store. The store, titled Brigham's Stamps and Coins, was operated by him from 1936 to 1980, closing when he retired at the age of 87. When asked about his football career in 1983, Brigham said "I really wouldn't have given it up for anything." He died of natural causes on October 6, 1987, in his hometown of Toledo, Ohio. He was 95, and the last living former Panhandle.
