= Wally O'Neill =

American football player (1902–1974)

Profile
- Positions: End, guard, tackle

Personal information
- Born: May 19, 1902; Moorhead, Minnesota, U.S.
- Died: August 18, 1974 (aged 72); Wauwatosa, Wisconsin, U.S.
- Listed height: 6 ft 0 in (1.83 m)
- Listed weight: 195 lb (88 kg)

Career information
- College: Superior Normal

Career history
- Duluth Kelleys (1925)

Career statistics
- Games played: 3

Richard Wallace O'Neill (May 19, 1902 – August 18, 1974) was an American football player. He played professionally as an end, guard, and tackle in the National Football League (NFL) for the Duluth Kelleys during the 1925 NFL season.
