= Walt Ellis =

American football player (1898–1980)

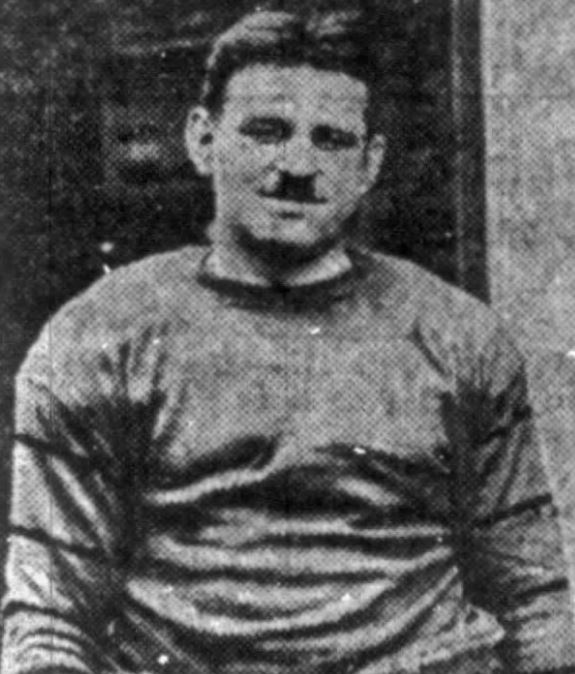

Profile
- Position: Tackle

Personal information
- Born: May 26, 1898; Groton, Connecticut
- Died: January 31, 1980 (aged 81); Waterbury, Connecticut

Career information
- College: Detroit

Career history
- Columbus Tigers (1924–1925); Detroit Panthers (1925); Chicago Cardinals (1926–1927)

Awards and highlights
- All-Pro (1926)

Career NFL statistics
- Games played: 36
- Games started: 31
- Stats at Pro Football Reference

Walter Joseph Ellis (May 26, 1898 – January 31, 1980) was an American professional football tackle in the National Football League. He played four seasons for the Columbus Tigers (1924–1925), Detroit Panthers (1925), and Chicago Cardinals (1926–1927).
