= Chris Cortemeglia =

American football player (1903–1989)

- Cortemeglia, 1943

Profile
- Positions: Halfback, defensive end, wingback

Personal information
- Born: September 21, 1903; Bryan, Texas, U.S.
- Died: March 14, 1989 (aged 85)
- Listed height: 6 ft 0 in (1.83 m)
- Listed weight: 210 lb (95 kg)

Career information
- High school: Bryan (TX)
- College: SMU

Career history
- Frankford Yellow Jackets (1927)

Awards and highlights
- 2× First-team All-Southwest Conference team (1925, 1926)

Career NFL statistics
- Games played: 2
- Stats at Pro Football Reference

Christopher Cortemeglia (September 21, 1903 – March 14, 1989) was an American football player. He played college football as an offensive halfback and defensive end for SMU from 1924 to 1926. He also played professional football in the National Football League (NFL) for the Frankford Yellow Jackets in 1927.

== Early life ==
Cortemeglia was born in 1903 at Bryan, Texas. He was a star back for the football teams at Bryan High School and Allen Academy from 1920 to 1922.

== SMU ==
Cortemglia, 1934

Cortemeglia played college football for SMU from 1924 to 1926. He played offensive halfback and defensive end and was known as a "bruising blocker and tackler" on the undefeated 1926 SMU Mustangs football team that won the Southwest Conference championship. Houston sports writer Kelly Cousins wrote that Cortemeglia, known as "the bull of the Brazos Valley" and the "Wallopin' Wop", was "the most powerful plunger" in the Southwest Conference since Jack Mahan and said that he had legs "as massive as church pillars and as strong as it is possible for human props to be."

Cortemeglia was selected by John Heisman as a first-team halfback on the 1925 All-Southwest Conference football team In 1926, he was selected as a first-team end on the All-Southwest Conference team and also as the best defensive lineman in the conference.

== Professional football ==
Cortemeglia also played professional football in the National Football League (NFL) as a wingback for the Frankford Yellow Jackets during 1927 season. He appeared in a total of two NFL games.

== Later life ==
During World War II, Cortemeglia served as a physical education instructor at the Great Lakes Naval Station. He also worked into the wholesale and retail beer business. He retired in 1975 and died in Houston in 1989 at age 85.
