= Herb Gruber =

American football player (1901–1979)

Profile
- Position: End

Personal information
- Born: December 22, 1901; Shelbyville, Kentucky
- Died: February 2, 1979 (aged 77); St. Matthews, Kentucky
- Listed height: 5 ft 9 in (1.75 m)
- Listed weight: 155 lb (70 kg)

Career information
- High school: Male (KY)
- College: Kentucky

Career history
- Louisville Brecks (1921–1923)

Career statistics
- Games played: 8
- Games started: 7
- Stats at Pro Football Reference

Herbert Calvin Gruber (December 22, 1901 – February 1, 1979) was an American football player.

Gruber was born in 1901 at Shelbyville, Kentucky. He attended Louisville Male High School. He was selected as an all-state player and served as captain of the 1919 Louisville team. He played college football at the University of Kentucky.

Gruber played professional football as an end for the Louisville Brecks in the National Football League (NFL). He appeared in eight NFL games, seven as a starter, during the 1921, 1922 and 1923 seasons.

After his football career was over, Gruber worked for the Jefferson County Board of Education and Gulf Oil Co. He died in 1979 in Louisville, Kentucky, at age 77.
