= Herb Davis (American football) =

American football player (1899–1997)

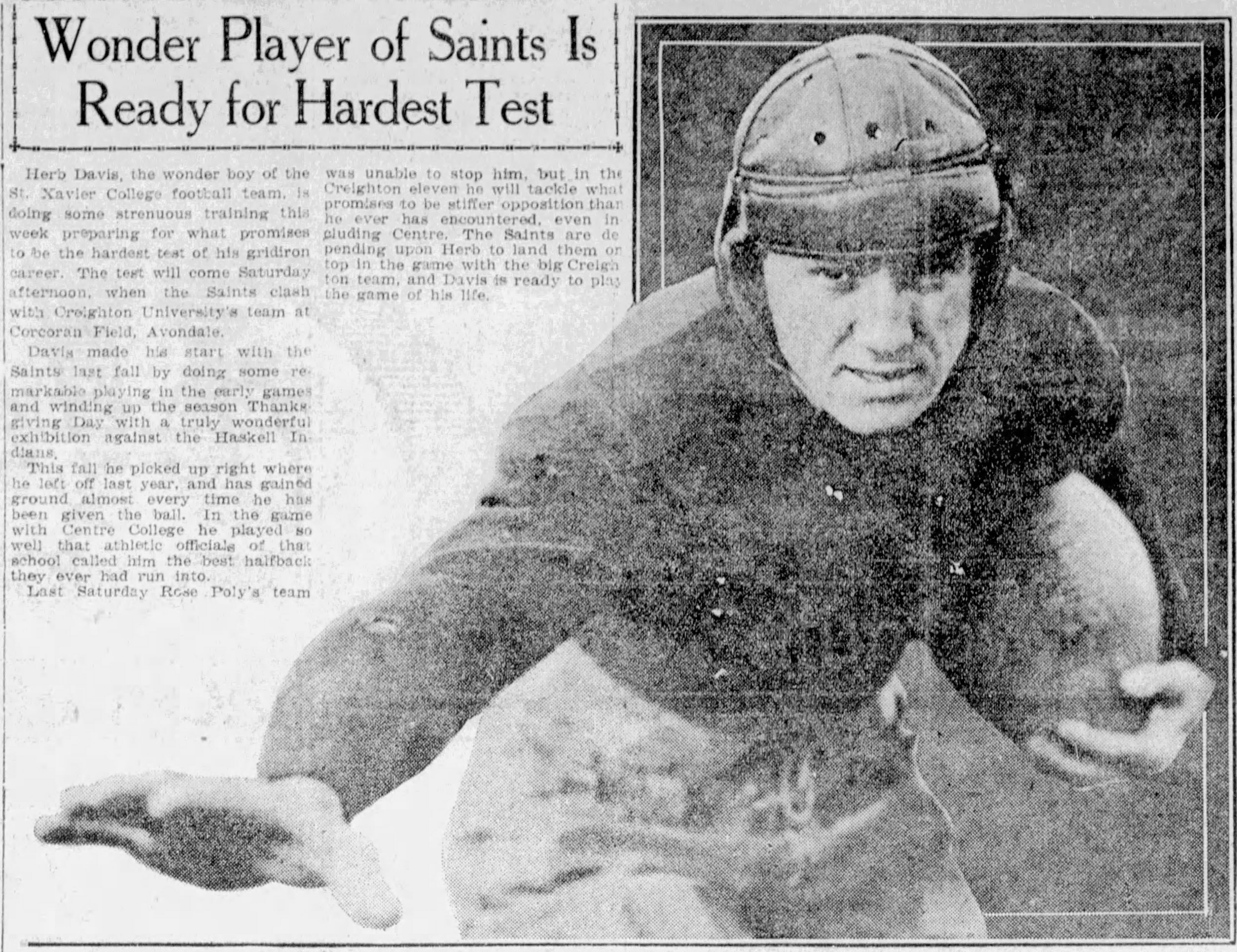
- Herb Davis, 1921

Profile
- Positions: Back, End

Personal information
- Born: November 12, 1899; Piqua, Ohio, U.S.
- Died: January 9, 1997 (aged 97); Lynchburg, Virginia, U.S.
- Listed height: 5 ft 11 in (1.80 m)
- Listed weight: 173 lb (78 kg)

Career information
- High school: Middletown (OH)
- College: Xavier

Career history
- Columbus Tigers (1925–1926)

Herbert Allan Davis (November 12, 1899 – January 9, 1997) was an American football player.

== Early life ==
Davis was born in Piqua, Ohio, in 1899. He attended Middletown High School in Ohio.

== St. Xavier ==
Davis declined a contract to play professional baseball for the Detroit Tigers and instead enrolled at St. Xavier College (later renamed Xavier University) of Cincinnati. He played college football as a halfback for St. Xavier from 1920 to 1923. By 1921, he had become known as "the wonder boy" of the Xavier football team. The Centre College athletic director called Davis the best all-around halfback that he and Centre's coach had seen. The Cincinnati Post in 1922 selected Davis as the best of Cincinnati's athletes. As a senior in 1922, he scored 41 of St. Xavier's 87 points.

While at St. Xavier, Davis also played baseball and basketball and was captain of the baseball and basketball teams.

== Professional football ==
Davis played semi-pro football for Cincinnati's Potter semi-pro team in 1924. He also played professional football at the back and end positions in the National Football League (NFL) for the Columbus Tigers in 1925 and 1926. He appeared in 10 NFL games. And in 1927, he played for the Cincinnati National Guards.

== Family and later years ==
Davis was married in 1923 to Mary Sander. After his playing career ended, Davis became the first sports announcer for WCKY radio in Cincinnati. He was also the city's recreation superintendent. He retired in 1967 and moved to Florida and then to Virginia. He died in 1997 at age 97 in Lynchburg, Virginia.
