= Eddie Scharer =

American football player (1902–1989)

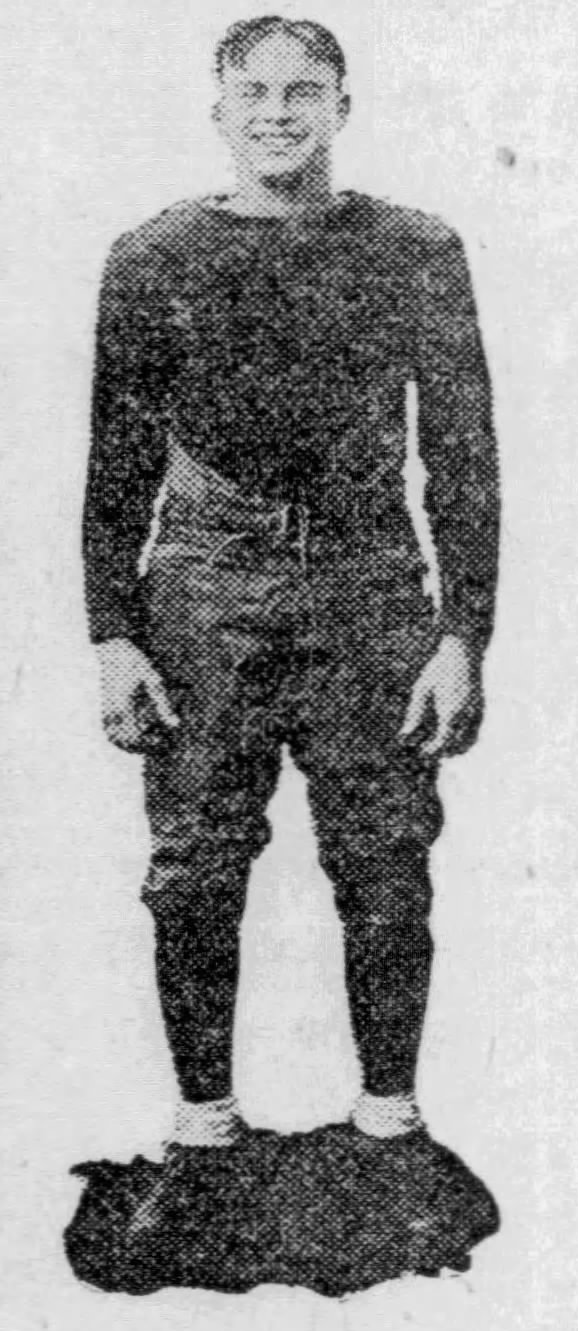

Profile
- Position: Halfback / Quarterback

Personal information
- Born: January 26, 1902; Toledo, Ohio, United States
- Died: May 5, 1989 (aged 87); Long Beach, California, United States
- Listed height: 5 ft 6 in (1.68 m)
- Listed weight: 165 lb (75 kg)

Career information
- College: Notre Dame

Career history
- Detroit Panthers (1926); Pottsville Maroons (1927); Detroit Wolverines (1928)
- Stats at Pro Football Reference

Edward Scharer (January 26, 1902 – May 5, 1989) was a professional football player from Toledo, Ohio. He attended and played his college football at the University of Notre Dame and University of Detroit Mercy. While at Notre Dame, Scharer caused a rift between the college's president, Father Charles L. O'Donnell and Knute Rockne. In 1925 O'Donnell expelled Scharer from Notre Dame, for "breaches of discipline". This led to a protest by Scharer's sponsor, Bill Hayes, a contractor from Saint Louis. Rockne then argued on Scharer's behalf for months to O'Donnell. Finally Scharer was allowed to play for the 1925 season.

Scharer then played in the National Football League with the Detroit Panthers in 1926, the Pottsville Maroons in 1927 and the Detroit Wolverines in 1928.
