= Bo Otto =

American football player (1902–1983)

Profile
- Positions: Center, guard, tackle

Personal information
- Born: June 5, 1902; Louisville, Kentucky, US
- Died: October 7, 1983 (aged 81); Cincinnati, Ohio, US
- Listed weight: 182 lb (83 kg)

Career information
- College: None

Career history
- Louisville Brecks (1922–1923)

Career statistics
- Games played: 7
- Games started: 7
- Stats at Pro Football Reference

Albert J. "Bo" Otto (June 5, 1902 – October 7, 1983) was an American football center for the Louisville Brecks of the National Football League (NFL) from 1922 to 1923. He played also guard and tackle.
