= Tubby Rohsenberger =

American football player (1896–1954)

Profile
- Position: Tackle

Personal information
- Born: November 6, 1896; Evansville, Indiana, US
- Died: January 15, 1954 (aged 57)

Career information
- College: Wisconsin, Illinois

Career history
- Evansville Crimson Giants (1921)

Career statistics
- Games played: 2
- Stats at Pro Football Reference

Otto Lee "Tubby" Rohsenberger (November 6, 1896 – January 15, 1954) was a player in the National Football League. He played with the Evansville Crimson Giants during the 1921 NFL season.

In college, Rohsenberger played for Wisconsin and Illinois.
