= Lew Skinner =

American football player

Profile
- Positions: Center, Fullback, Guard

Personal information
- Born: May 29, 1898; Indianapolis, Indiana, U.S.
- Died: September 21, 1942 (age 44); Indianapolis, Indiana, U.S.

Career information
- College: Purdue

Career history
- Hammond Pros (1920); Evansville Crimson Giants (1922)
- Stats at Pro Football Reference

Lewis Brittan Skinner Jr. was a professional football player in the early 1920s. He played in the early National Football League for the Hammond Pros and the Evansville Crimson Giants. Prior to playing pro football, Skinner played at the college level at Purdue University.
