= Don Wiper =

American football player (1900–1961)

Profile
- Position: Quarterback

Personal information
- Born: July 8, 1900; Columbus, Ohio, U.S.
- Died: November 8, 1961 (aged 61); Columbus, Ohio, U.S.
- Listed height: 5 ft 10 in (1.78 m)
- Listed weight: 150 lb (68 kg)

Career information
- High school: North (Columbus)
- College: Ohio State

Career history
- Columbus Panhandles (1922)
- Stats at Pro Football Reference

Donald Williams Wiper (July 8, 1900 – November 8, 1961) was an American football quarterback. He played college football for the Ohio State Buckeyes and professionally for the Columbus Panhandles of the National Football League (NFL).

== Early life ==
Donald Williams Wiper was born on July 8, 1900, in Columbus, Ohio. He attended North High School in Columbus.

== College career ==
Wiper enrolled at Ohio State University to play college football for the Buckeyes. He was a two-year letterman from 1920 to 1921. He was quarterback of the first Rose Bowl team in school history, the 1920 Buckeyes.

== Professional career ==
Wiper played in two games, starting one, for the Columbus Panhandles of the National Football League (NFL) during the 1922 season.

== Post-playing career ==
Wiper was an assistant football coach for the Buckeyes from 1924 to 1925. He also spent time coaching at Gahanna-Lincoln High School. He was an attorney. Ohio governor John W. Bricker appointed Wiper employers' representative of the board of review of the Bureau of Unemployment Compensation. He was the executive director of the Ohio Manufacturers Association from 1951 until his death. He died on November 8, 1961, at University Hospital in Columbus after having suffered a heart attack a week prior.
