= Paul Lynch (American football) =

American football player (1901–1961)

Profile
- Position: Back

Personal information
- Born: January 10, 1901; Wichita, Kansas
- Died: January 25, 1961 (aged 60); Olmsted County, Minnesota
- Listed height: 6 ft 1 in (1.85 m)
- Listed weight: 190 lb (86 kg)

Career information
- College: Ohio Northern

Career history
- Columbus Tigers (1925)

Eugene Paul Lynch (January 10, 1901 – January 25, 1961) was an American football player.

Lynch was born in 1901 in Wichita, Kansas. He attended Sievers High School in Dayton, Ohio. He next attended Marietta College and Ohio Northern University.

He played professional football as a back in the National Football League (NFL) for the Columbus Tigers in 1925. He appeared in seven NFL games, six as a starter.

He died in 1961 in Olmsted County, Minnesota.
