= Bob Karch =

American football player (1894–1958)

Profile
- Position: Tackle

Personal information
- Born: July 4, 1894; Columbus, Ohio, US
- Died: November 14, 1958 (aged 64); Bexley, Ohio, US
- Listed height: 6 ft 1 in (1.85 m)
- Listed weight: 220 lb (100 kg)

Career information
- High school: Columbus (OH) South
- College: Ohio State

Career history
- Columbus Panhandles (1922); Louisville Brecks (1923)

Career statistics
- Games played: 6
- Games started: 6
- Stats at Pro Football Reference

Robert Hosack Karch (July 4, 1894 – November 14, 1958) was an American football player.

Karch was born in 1894 in Columbus, Ohio.

He played college football at Ohio State and was selected by Frank G. Menke to the 1916 All-America college football team.

He also played professional football as a tackle in the National Football League (NFL). He played for the Columbus Panhandles (1922) and the Louisville Brecks (1923). He appeared in six NFL games, all as a starter.

Karch sustained a heart attack in 1955 and shot and killed himself at his home in Bexley, Ohio, in 1958.
