= Corl Zimmerman =

American football player (1901–1967)

Profile
- Positions: Guard, tackle

Personal information
- Born: September 23, 1901; Center, Ohio, U.S.
- Died: August 14, 1967 (aged 65); Dayton, Ohio, U.S.
- Listed height: 6 ft 0 in (1.83 m)
- Listed weight: 185 lb (84 kg)

Career information
- High school: Central (OH)
- College: Mount Union

Career history
- Dayton Triangles (1927–1929)

Career statistics
- Games: 13

Pleasant L. "Corl" Zimmerman (September 23, 1901 – August 14, 1967) was an American football player.

He played college football at Mount Union and professional football in the National Football League (NFL) as a guard and tackle for the Dayton Triangles. He appeared in 13 NFL games, seven as a starter, during the 1927, 1928, and 1929 seasons.

In later years, Zimmerman owned and operated the Fernwood Nursery. He died in 1967 at age 65 in a fire that engulfed his home located behind his nursery.
