= Carl Waite =

American football player (1902–1961)

No. 0
- Positions: Back, end

Personal information
- Born: February 27, 1902; White Plains, New York, U.S.
- Died: October 14, 1961 (aged 59); Monticello, New York, U.S.
- Listed height: 5 ft 9 in (1.75 m)
- Listed weight: 205 lb (93 kg)

Career information
- High school: White Plains
- College: Rutgers; Georgetown

Career history
- Frankford Yellow Jackets (1928); Orange/Newark Tornadoes (1929–1930)

Career statistics
- Rushing touchdowns: 1
- Receiving touchdowns: 2
- Stats at Pro Football Reference

Carl Ebenezer Waite (February 27, 1902 – October 14, 1961) was an American professional football player who was a back and end for three seasons in the National Football League (NFL) with the Frankford Yellow Jackets, and the Orange/Newark Tornadoes. Waite appeared in 27 games, making 15 starts. He played college football for the Rutgers Scarlet Knights before transferring to the Georgetown Hoyas.
