= 1920 Detroit Heralds season =

National Football League team season

- Owner: Detroit Herald newspaper
- Head coach: Bill Marshall
- Home stadium: Navin Field (1), Mack Park (3)

Results
- Record: 2–3–3 Overall; 1–3–0 APFA
- League place: 9th APFA

The 1920 Detroit Heralds season was the 16th season for the Detroit Heralds, an independent American football team. Led by coach Bill Marshall, the team compiled a 2–3–3 record. The 1920 season was the team's first competing in the new American Professional Football Association (predecessor to the National Football League). The team finished in ninth place in the league.

== Schedule ==
Game	Date	Opponent	Result	Record	Venue	Attendance	Recap	Sources
1	October 10	Cleveland Panthers	W 40–14	1–0	Navin Field		Recap	
2	October 17	at Chicago Tigers	L 0–12	1–1	Cubs Park	5,000	Recap	
3	October 24	Columbus Panhandles	W 6–0	2–1	Mack Park	"big crowd"	Recap	
4	October 31	at Racine Cardinals	L 0–21	2–2	Cubs Park	3,000	Recap	
—	November 7	at Akron Pros	Cancelled due to rain					
5	November 14	at Fort Wayne Friars	T 0–0	2–2–1	League Park	5,000	Recap	
—	November 21	Detroit Armadas	Cancelled due to rain					
6	November 25	at Dayton Triangles	L 0–28	2–3–1	Triangle Park		Recap	
7	November 28	Lansing Oldsmobile	T 0–0	2–3–2	Mack Park		Recap	
8	December 5	Detroit Maroons	T 7–7	2–3–3	Mack Park		Recap	
Note: Non-APFA teams in italics. Thanksgiving Day: November 25.

== Game summaries ==
=== Game 1: vs. Cleveland Panthers ===
	1	2	3	4	Total
Panthers	0	0	7	7	14
Heralds	6	13	14	7	40

October 10, 1920, at Navin Field

The Heralds opened their season with a game against the Cleveland Panthers, played at Navin Field on October 10, 1920. The Heralds won by a 40–14 score. Eddie Moegle, the Heralds' right halfback, scored the team's first touchdown of the 1920 NFL season. Additional touchdowns were scored by left end Heinie Schultz, left tackle Hugh Lowery, substitute left end Joe Fitzgerald, substitute fullback Wood, and quarterback Perce Wilson. Right tackle Steamer Horning converted four goals after touchdown for Detroit. After "a mix-up" with Detroit's Charlie Guy and Gil Runkel, Cleveland's star halfback Arnold Vogel was carried off the field in the fourth quarter with a broken left shoulder and three broken ribs; he was taken to Detroit Receiving Hospital for medical treatment. The Detroit Free Press called it "a rough and tumble match," but also wrote that it was "a slow and rather uninteresting football battle."

The Heralds' starting lineup against Columbus was Heinie Schultz (left end), Hugh Lowery (left tackle), Clarence Appelgran (left guard), Gil Runkel (center), Charlie Guy (right guard), Steamer Horning (right tackle), Ray Whipple (right end), Perce Wilson (quarterback), King (left halfback), Eddie Moegle (right halfback), and Earl Dunn (fullback). Jimmy Kelly (left halfback), Fitzgerald (left end), Wood (fullback), and McCoy (right tackle) appeared in the game as substitutes.

=== Game 2: at Chicago Tigers ===
	1	2	3	4	Total
Heralds	0	0	0	0	0
Tigers	6	0	6	0	12

October 17, 1920, at Cub Park

The Heralds lost by a 12–0 score to the Chicago Tigers on October 17, 1920, in a game played at Cub Park in Chicago.

=== Game 3: vs. Columbus Panhandles ===
	1	2	3	4	Total
Panhandles	0	0	0	0	0
Heralds	0	6	0	0	6

October 24, 1920, at Mack Park

Following the loss, the Heralds were visited by the Columbus Panhandles, an APFA team. The Panhandles' passing attack helped them outgain the Heralds, but, according to the Ohio State Journal, it was a close game and "one play decided the outcome." The Heralds' left end, Joe Fitzgerald, intercepted a pass from Frank Nesser and ran it back for an 85-yard touchdown.

The Heralds' starting lineup against Columbus was Fitzgerald (left end), Hugh Lowery (left tackle), Moose Gardner (left guard), Gil Runkel (center), Charlie Guy (right guard), Steamer Horning (right tackle), Ray Whipple (right end), Bill Joyce (quarterback), Bo Hanley (left halfback), Jimmy Kelly (right halfback), and Earl Dunn (fullback). Perce Wilson (quarterback), Birtie Maher (left end) and Ty Krentler (fullback) appeared in the game as substitutes.

=== Game 4: at Chicago Cardinals ===
	1	2	3	4	Total
Heralds	0	0	0	0	0
Cardinals	0	0	21	0	21

October 31, 1920, at Cub Park

The Heralds lost to the Chicago Cardinals on October 31, 1920, in a game played at Cub Park in Chicago. The game was a scoreless tie until the middle of the third period. Over a five-minute period, the Cardinals blocked three punts by Steamer Horning. Chicago scored touchdowns each time and won the game 21–0.

=== Game 5: at Fort Wayne Friars ===
	1	2	3	4	Total
Heralds	0	0	0	0	0
Friars	0	0	0	0	0

November 14, 1920, at League Park

On November 14, 1920, the Heralds played the Fort Wayne Friars to a scoreless tie at League Park in Fort Wayne, Indiana. The game was called "one of the best games of football seen here this season."

=== Game 6: at Dayton Triangles ===
	1	2	3	4	Total
Heralds	0	0	0	0	0
Triangles	0	0	0	0	0

November 25, 1920, at Triangle Park

=== Game 7: vs Lansing Oldsmobile ===
	1	2	3	4	Total
Oldsmobile	0	0	0	0	0
Heralds	0	0	0	0	0

November 28, 1920, at Mack Park

On November 28, 1920, the Heralds played to a scoreless tie against the Lansing Oldsmobile team on a muddy field at Mack Park. The Heralds came closest to scoring on a long forward pass from Ernest Watson to Joe Fitzgerald who was downed at Lansing's six-yard line. The Heralds were held on downs from the six-yard line.

The Heralds' starting lineup against Lansing was Blake Miller (left end), Hugh Lowery (left tackle), Gates (left guard), Gil Runkel (center), Tom Dickinson (right guard), Steamer Horning (right tackle), Joe Fitzgerald (right end), Ernest Watson (quarterback), Stan Jacobs (left halfback), Lynn Allen (right halfback), and Jimmy Kelly (fullback). Earl Dunn (fullback) and Perce Wilson (left halfback) appeared in the game as substitutes.

=== Game 8: vs. Detroit Maroons ===
	1	2	3	4	Total
Maroons	0	0	0	7	7
Heralds	0	0	7	0	7

December 5, 1920, at Mack Park

The Heralds finished the 1920 season with a game against the Detroit Maroons for the city championship. Substitute fullback Ty Krentler scored the Heralds' touchdown in the final minute of the third quarter. The Maroons tied the game with a touchdown in the fourth quarter by fullback Schultz.

== Standings ==
1920 APFA standings
	W	L	T	PCT	DIV	DPCT	PF	PA	STK
Akron Pros†	8	0	3	1.000	6–0–3	1.000	151	7	T2
Decatur Staleys	10	1	2	.909	5–1–2	.833	164	21	T1
Buffalo All-Americans	9	1	1	.900	4–1–1	.800	258	32	T1
Chicago Cardinals	6	2	2	.750	3–2–1	.600	101	29	T1
Rock Island Independents	6	2	2	.750	4–2–1	.667	201	49	W1
Dayton Triangles	5	2	2	.714	4–2–2	.667	150	54	L1
Rochester Jeffersons	6	3	2	.667	0–1–0	.000	156	57	T1
Canton Bulldogs	7	4	2	.636	4–3–1	.571	208	57	W1
Detroit Heralds	2	3	3	.400	1–3–0	.250	53	82	T2
Cleveland Tigers	2	4	2	.333	1–4–2	.200	28	46	L1
Chicago Tigers	2	5	1	.286	1–5–1	.167	49	63	W1
Hammond Pros	2	5	0	.286	0–3–0	.000	41	154	L3
Columbus Panhandles	2	6	2	.250	0–5–0	.000	41	121	W1
Muncie Flyers	0	1	0	.000	0–1–0	.000	0	45	L1

† Awarded the Brunswick-Balke Collender Cup and named APFA Champions
by vote of league owners. Staleys claimed a co-title.

== Players ==
- Lynn Allen, kicker, 2 games, 170 pounds, 6' 0", University of Detroit
- Clarence Appelgran, guard, 4 games, 200 pounds, 6' 2", University of Illinois
- Chris Bentz, tackle, 2 games, 215 pounds, 6' 4", Northern State Univ., Montana
- Charlie Carman, 1 game, 215 pounds, 5' 10", Vanderbilt
- Tom Dickinson, end, 3 games, 175 pounds, 5' 8", Syracuse
- Earl Dunn, fullback, 8 games, 182 pounds
- Russ Finsterwald, wingback, 2 games, 165 pounds, 5' 9", Ohio, Syracuse
- Joe Fitzgerald, end, 8 games, 150 pounds
- Moose Gardner, guard, 2 games, 220 pounds, 6' 1", Wisconsin
- Gates, 1 game
- Charlie Guy, guard, 7 games, 170 pounds, 6' 0', Dartmouth, Washington & Jefferson
- Bo Hanley, wingback, 3 games, 150 pounds, 5' 7", Marquette
- Steamer Horning, tackle, 8 games, 198 pounds, 6' 0", Colgate
- Stan Jacobs, tailback, 3 games
- Marshall Jones, 1 game, 165 pounds, 5' 11", North Dakota
- Bill Joyce, quarterback, 1 game, 180 pounds, 5' 8", Holy Cross, Catholic
- Jimmy Kelly, tailback, 6 games, 160 pounds, 5' 9", St. Louis, Detroit
- King, 1 game
- Ty Krentler, fullback, 5 games, 160 pounds, Univ. of Detroit
- Alvin Loucks, 1 game, 170 pounds, Michigan
- Hugh Lowery, tackle, 7 games, 220 pounds, 6' 0", Indiana, Franklin (IN)
- Birtie Maher, end, 2 games, 180 pounds, 5' 8", Univ. Detroit
- McCoy, 1 game, 175 pounds
- Blake Miller, 2 games, 170 pounds, 5' 7", Michigan St.
- Eddie Moegle, 1 game, 186 pounds, 5' 9", Univ. Detroit
- Gil Runkel, center, 7 games, 210 pounds
- Heinie Schultz, 1 game, 182 pounds, 5' 10"
- Don Straw, guard, 1 game, 210 pounds, 5' 11", Washington & Jefferson
- Ernest Watson, 2 games, 155 pounds, 5' 8", Olivet
- Ray Whipple, end, 5 games, 170 pounds, 5' 9", Notre Dame
- Perce Wilson, back, 7 games, 150 pounds
- Wood, fullback, 2 games
