= Tillie Voss =

American football player (1897–1975)

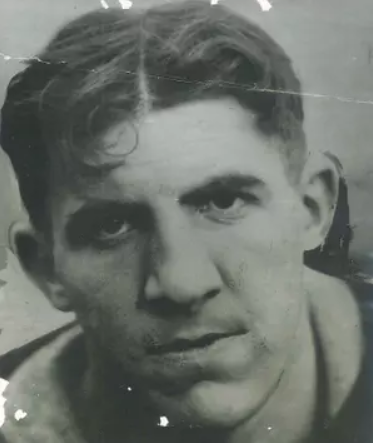
- c. 1920

No. 8, 18, 7, 3, 11, 27, 14
- Positions: End, tackle

Personal information
- Born: March 28, 1897; Detroit, Michigan, U.S.
- Died: December 14, 1975 (aged 78); Stuart, Florida, U.S.
- Listed height: 6 ft 3 in (1.91 m)
- Listed weight: 208 lb (94 kg)

Career information
- High school: Detroit Jesuit (Detroit, Michigan); Georgetown Preparatory (North Bethesda, Maryland)
- College: Detroit (1915–1917, 1919–1920)

Career history

Playing
- Detroit Heralds (1918); Detroit Tigers (1921); Buffalo All-Americans (1921); Rock Island Independents (1922); Akron Pros (1922); Toledo Maroons (1923); Cleveland Bulldogs (1924)*; Green Bay Packers (1924); Detroit Panthers (1925); New York Giants (1926); Chicago Bears (1927–1928); Dayton Triangles (1929); Buffalo Bisons (1929); Milwaukee Nighthawks (1930); Memphis Tigers (1930)
- * Offseason or practice squad member only

Coaching
- Toronto (1931) Assistant coach

Operations
- Detroit Tigers (1921) Vice president

Awards and highlights
- NFL receiving touchdowns leader (1924); 2× First-team All-Pro (1923, 1924); 2× Second-team All-Pro (1922, 1925); First-team All-American (1920)

Career NFL statistics
- Games played: 94 or 95 (Note: Sources conflict.)
- Games started: 88
- Touchdowns: 10
- Stats at Pro Football Reference

Other information
- Basketball career

Career information
- College: Detroit (1915–1921)
- Playing career: 1915–1930
- Position: Center / forward

Career history

Playing
- 1915–1916: Detroit Rayls
- 1918–1919: Detroit Rayls
- 1921: Detroit YMO
- 1921–1924: Fort Wayne Caseys
- 1921–1925: Detroit Kelly Greens / Detroit McCarthys
- 1922: Omars
- 1923: American Oils
- 1923: Delco
- 1923: Detroit Red Arrows
- 1924: Milwaukee Badgers
- 1924–1926: Detroit Pulaski
- 1925: Port Clinton American Legion
- 1925: Consumers Power
- 1926: Rochester Centrals
- 1926: Brooklyn Arcadians
- 1926–1927: Washington Palace Five
- 1927–1928: Detroit Cardinals
- 1928: Fort Wayne Hoosiers
- 1928–1930: Chicago Bruins

Coaching
- 1925–1926: Detroit Pulaski

Career highlights
- Second-team All-ABL (1927)

Walter Clarence "Tillie" Voss (March 28, 1897 – December 14, 1975) was an American professional football and basketball player. An end and tackle in football, and a center and forward in basketball, he played for record 10 National Football League (NFL) teams (tied with Shayne Graham and Nick Vannett) along with seven teams in the American Basketball League (ABL). A native of Detroit, Michigan, Voss was a top athlete in high school and college, where he competed in four sports for the University of Detroit: football, basketball, baseball, and track and field. He captained both the football and basketball teams and starred in both sports, earning first-team All-American honors in football and All-Western honors in basketball. Voss concluded his collegiate career as Detroit basketball's all-time leading scorer.

Considered, at the peak of his career, both one of the greatest ends in football and one of the best centers in basketball, Voss played many seasons professionally in both sports. In football, Voss played in the NFL for nine seasons, being a member of the Detroit Tigers (1921), Buffalo All-Americans (1921), Rock Island Independents (1922), Akron Pros (1922), Toledo Maroons (1923), Green Bay Packers (1924), Detroit Panthers (1925), New York Giants (1926), Chicago Bears (1927–1928), Dayton Triangles (1929) and Buffalo Bisons (1929). He also had stints with several other independent teams and a non-playing stint with the NFL's Cleveland Bulldogs. Voss was honored as an All-Pro four times and was a first-team selection in 1923 and 1924, becoming the first first-team All-Pro in the history of the Green Bay Packers. While in Green Bay, he also led the NFL in receiving touchdowns for the 1924 season.

Voss also played for numerous basketball teams in his career. He was a star player for the Fort Wayne Caseys and Detroit Kelly Greens early in his career, before becoming one of the founders of the American Basketball League (ABL) in 1925. At the start of the ABL, Voss served as player-coach for the Detroit Pulaski, although he did not remain there long. Across five ABL seasons, he played for Detroit Pulaski (1925–1926), the Rochester Centrals (1926), Brooklyn Arcadians (1926), Washington Palace Five (1926–1927), Detroit Cardinals (1927–1928), Fort Wayne Hoosiers (1928) and Chicago Bruins (1928–1930), earning All-ABL honors in 1927. Voss retired from playing after the 1930 season. He later was a welfare worker in Michigan before moving to Florida for the final years of his life. Voss died in 1975 and was posthumously inducted into the University of Detroit Sports Hall of Fame in 1978.

== Early life ==
Voss was born on March 28, 1897, in Detroit, Michigan. He grew up there and began playing basketball in grammar school. Voss attended the University of Detroit Jesuit High School and Academy, as well as Georgetown Preparatory School in North Bethesda, Maryland. He was an accomplished athlete in high school and continued competing in sports in college at the University of Detroit.

== College career ==
=== 1915–1917 ===
At the University of Detroit, Voss competed in football, basketball, baseball, and track and field. While still attending high school, he began appearing for the University of Detroit varsity basketball team. Starting in 1915, Voss also began playing for the Detroit Tigers football team, playing tackle, end and placekicker in his career.

In the 1915 football season, Voss "gave signs of developing into one of the best tackles the U. of D has turned out," reported the Detroit Free Press. After the season, he was elected team captain for 1916, although he missed the beginning of that year due to an eligibility issue. He started as a member of the Detroit reserve team before returning to the varsity team when his eligibility was restored in October 1916. Playing end, he earned a varsity letter for the 1916 season while the Tigers compiled a record of 3–2–2. While playing end, Voss was noted for his pass catching ability. In 1917, Voss remained Detroit's captain and played as a tackle, being one of the heaviest players on the team at 197 pounds (89 kg). He led the team to a record of 8–1, with Detroit outscoring opponents by a margin of 389 to 34, with their only loss being to the Michigan Wolverines. Among his notable performances that year were 10 extra points kicked in a 145–0 win over Toledo and two blocked punts in a 35–6 win against Kalamazoo Normal.

Voss was also a standout center and forward for the Detroit basketball team, earning recognition as being "about the best pivot man in the city or state" during the 1915–16 season. The next year, he served as the team's captain, making him the first person in the history of the University of Detroit to serve as team captain in two major sports; he led the 1916–17 basketball team with an average of 12.9 points per game. Outside of college basketball, Voss was also a member of an independent club, the Detroit Rayls, helping them win a championship series over the Detroit YMCA in 1916, and later playing for them again from 1918 to 1919. In his second stint with the Rayls, he contributed to them winning the middle west championship.

=== 1918–1921: World War I enlistment and return to Detroit ===
Voss left the University of Detroit in June 1918, enlisting in the U.S. Army Tank Corps during World War I. He was stationed at Camp Gettysburg before being sent back to Detroit to assist in recruiting efforts for the Army. While back in Detroit, Voss played football for the Detroit Heralds during the 1918 season. In 1919, he returned to college and rejoined the Detroit football team, although he missed the start of the season due to injury. Voss helped the 1919 Detroit football team to a record of 8–1. He was honored as All-Western for the 1919 season and reported to be an All-American selection. Voss then returned to Detroit's basketball team for the 1919–20 season; according to the Buffalo Courier, some critics considered him to be the best center in the country.

Voss played his last season with the football team in 1920 as they compiled a record of 8–2. He was named All-Western and first-team All-American by Walter Eckersall, as well as third-team All-American by Walter Camp. Voss is the lone player in the history of Detroit's football program to be named All-American by Camp, while Eckersall called him "the greatest tackle seen in the middle west" since Curtis Redden. In naming him, along with Duke Slater, All-Western, the Detroit Free Press noted that he and Slater had no equals at their position: "Both have great physical strength and rugged endurance ... Offensively and defensively, Voss and Slater have done all and even more than anyone could reasonably expect of a tackle." After his last football season, Voss played his final season with the basketball team in 1920–21; he received a fifth varsity letter in the sport as an exemption due to the war. Voss was the team's leading scorer with 8.7 points per game in his last year. In his final game in college, he made eight field goals and "turned in a brilliant floor performance [to] finish his intercollegiate career in a veritable burst of glory", according to the Free Press. He was an All-Western selection with the basketball team. Following Detroit's 1920–21 season, Voss joined the Detroit YMO team. By the end of his basketball career, Voss was regarded as the greatest player in school history. He scored 752 points with the Detroit basketball team, a school record that stood until the late 1930s when it was eclipsed by Bob Calihan. In 1936, he was a first-team selection on an all-time All-Detroit basketball team.

According to the son of Howard Philippart, one of Voss's Detroit football teammates, Voss once allegedly ran into a cinder block to get sleep before an important game. Philippart's son said, "so the story was told from my father ... [Voss] one day had a terrible toothache. Aspirin did not seem to help and he desperately needed sleep for the big Navy game the following day. 'I gotta do something,' he told my father and ran full tilt head first into the cinder block wall. As they carted him off to bed for a good night sleep, the players silently applauded his dedication and loyalty."

== Professional football career ==
=== 1920–1921: Start of career ===
According to a 1921 article in The Dayton Herald, Voss made one appearance for the Dayton Triangles of the American Professional Football Association (APFA) – now known as the National Football League (NFL) – during the inaugural 1920 APFA season. The paper mentioned that he made a brief appearance in their season-ending loss to the Akron Pros, (Note: The Triangles played two games against the Pros, but only the last one was in Dayton, Ohio, and the Herald stated his appearance was "in Dayton".) and "the few minutes the Triangle fans had to see him in action sold them on him". However, Voss was still in college at the time of the Pros–Triangles game and did not appear in newspaper box scores.

Voss signed with the Detroit Tigers of the APFA for the 1921 season to play at tackle and end; he was also the team's vice president. He opened the 1921 season as the Tigers' starting right end, blocking a field goal in the season-opening 0–0 tie to the Rock Island Independents. The following week, he led the Tigers to what would be their lone win as an APFA franchise – a 10–7 defeat over the Dayton Triangles in which Voss returned a fumble 66 yards for a touchdown and kicked an extra point. The Tigers then lost all five of their remaining APFA games, being shut out in four of them. Despite the team's poor performances, newspaper reports several times mentioned Voss as one of their top players. In a 20–0 loss to the Akron Pros, Voss caught a 35-yard pass, the Tigers' only completed pass of the game, while he scored an extra point in a 20–9 loss to the Decatur Staleys. The Tigers finished the season with a record of 1–5–1, placing 16th in the APFA, as Voss started all of their games. He was responsible for 8 of the 19 total points the Tigers scored in their one-year stay in the league.

Newspaper advertisement featuring Voss

After the Tigers season ended, Voss, along with teammates Charlie Guy, Steamer Horning and Waddy Kuehl, joined the Buffalo All-Americans, a team that still had several remaining games to play. He appeared in four or five games, four as a starter, for the All-Americans, as they finished the season with a record of 9–1–2 and controversially placed second in the league. Voss ended the year with 11 or 12 games played, one touchdown, and two extra points.

=== 1922–1924: Rock Island, Akron, Toledo, Cleveland, and Green Bay ===
In September 1922, Voss, along with his college and Tigers teammate Walt Clago, signed with the Rock Island Independents, who were impressed by his play against them the previous season. He became one of the team's top receivers and was also known for his speed in punt coverage. For the Independents, Voss started all seven games and helped the team to a record of 4–2–1, fifth place in the now-NFL, with three of their wins being shutouts. Among his performances with Rock Island were six extra points in a 60–0 win against the Evansville Crimson Giants, a receiving touchdown and fumble return touchdown in a 43–0 victory against the Dayton Triangles, and a 72-yard interception return in a season-ending 3–0 loss to the Chicago Bears.

After Rock Island's season ended, Voss joined the Akron Pros in time for their next game, against the Bears. He started the Pros' final three games of the season, (Note: Pro Football Archives lists him as having appeared in two games, both as a starter, for the Pros, while Pro Football Reference states he appeared in three games, two as a starter. However, newspaper accounts mention Voss as a starter for all three games.) all losses. Voss ended the season with 10 games played, posting two touchdowns and six extra points, for a total of 18 points; he was Rock Island's fourth-leading scorer. George Halas, an NFL founder and head coach of the Bears, selected Voss second-team All-Pro for the 1922 season.

In September 1923, Voss was traded from the Independents to the Toledo Maroons for Bob Phelan. He caught a 35-yard touchdown pass in his Maroons debut, in a 7–7 tie to the Racine Legion. Playing at tackle and end, he started all eight of the Maroons' games and was one of their top players, as the team compiled a record of 3–3–2, finishing 10th in the NFL. He scored a total of seven points, coming from a touchdown and an extra point, and was Toledo's second-leading scorer for the 1923 season. Voss was honored as an All-Pro by two selectors for his play during the 1923 season, being a first-team choice of the Canton Daily News and a third-team selection by the Green Bay Press-Gazette.

Following his season with the Maroons, Voss was the first player purchased by Samuel Deutsch, owner of the Cleveland Bulldogs, for the 1924 season. However, Deutsch later purchased the Canton Bulldogs and thus received Bird Carroll and Guy Chamberlin at the end position. As a result of having multiple talented ends, Deutsch decided to sell Voss to the Green Bay Packers prior to the season. With the Packers, he had the best season of his professional career and was one of the team's top players at end. Voss was the leading receiver for the Packers, a team that was known for their frequent use of passes.

Starting all 11 games for the 7–4 Packers, Voss caught a total of five touchdown passes, tying Bob Rapp for the NFL lead and breaking the single-season league record. With 30 points, he was the number one scorer for Green Bay that season. In a 6–3 win over the Racine Legion that year, Voss had what Jerry Roberts described as one of the highlights of his career, as he caught the game-winning touchdown in the fourth quarter. The Journal said of his catch, "Capt. [Curly] Lambeau, standing on the 45-yard line, zipped the pigskin to Voss, who collided with [Bill] Giaver. Tillie went down on his knees, but lunged forward and grabbed the oval, just inches off the ground." He also, in a game against the Chicago Bears, got ejected along with opponent Frank Hanny after the two punched each other. Some sources have considered this the first ejection in the history of the NFL, although contemporary sources show otherwise. Voss was a Press-Gazette first-team All-Pro for the 1924 season, becoming the first Packers' player to receive this recognition.

=== 1925–1930: Later career ===
Voss signed with the Detroit Panthers in September 1925. He was one of their leading receivers and helped them go unbeaten in their first seven games before injuring his ankle in a 21–0 win against the Milwaukee Badgers. Amidst his absence, the Panthers lost to the Chicago Bears, their first defeat of the season. In total, Voss appeared in 10 of the Panthers' 12 games, helping them to a record of 8–2–2 and a third-place finish in the league. He was named second-team All-Pro by the Ohio State Journal and third-team All-Pro by Collyer's Eye magazine in 1925. After the Panthers season ended, the Chicago Bears asked him to join them, but he was unable to due to basketball season starting up.

In 1926, Voss signed with the New York Giants. He was identified one of their star players and appeared in 12 of 13 games, 11 as a starter at end, only missing a game against the Bears due to an ankle injury. Voss was released at the start of November for a violation of team training rules, but shortly after rejoined the team and had the game-winning block of a kick in a 14–13 win against the Duluth Eskimos. It was one of several kicks he blocked during the season, in which he helped the Giants to a record of 8–4–1, sixth place in the league; all of their losses were by a margin of one score.

Voss was purchased from the Giants by the Chicago Bears for the 1927 season. He became the first former Green Bay Packers player to join the Bears, their biggest rival. According to the Green Bay Press-Gazette, most NFL teams felt that his "football days were over", but he "more than earn[ed] his money" with the Bears. He appeared in 11 games, starting eight, for the 1927 Bears, helping them to a third-place finish in the league with a record of 9–3–2. Voss returned to the Bears for the 1928 season, the only time in his NFL career he returned to his team for the next season. Despite entering his 30s, he started all 13 games for the Bears, helping them place fifth in the NFL with a record of 7–5–1. He caught a touchdown pass in a 34–0 win against the Chicago Cardinals in what ended up being his final NFL score.

Voss (in striped sleeves) has no chance to hold the edge against Bears quarterback Joey Sternaman when faced with a body-block and the interference of fullback Red Grange, October 1929.

Voss signed with the Buffalo Bisons in 1929 for his last NFL season. He played his first game of the season on September 28, as a backup for the Dayton Triangles in their 14–7 loss to the Frankford Yellow Jackets, before starting with the Bisons the next day in their game against the Chicago Cardinals, a 9–3 loss. He appeared in seven or eight games, seven as a starter, for the Bisons, before being released in November to allow him to return to basketball. Buffalo compiled a record of 1–7–1, placing 10th in the NFL, while Dayton lost all six of their games en route to a 12th-place finish in their final season.

Voss joined the Milwaukee Nighthawks in 1930, an independent football team that scheduled some games against NFL franchises. He was a leading player for the Nighthawks, a team that compiled a record of 4–5. After the end of the Nighthawks' season, Voss signed with the Memphis Tigers, one of the team's opponents, for the end of the year. He debuted in a win against the Wichita Panthers and was with the Tigers as they went 2–3 in their final five games. Voss retired following the 1930 season due to injuries.

=== Player profile ===
Across his professional career, which spanned from 1918 to 1930, Voss played for 10 NFL teams and three independent teams. (Note: See ESPN for 10 NFL teams. The three independents teams included the Detroit Heralds (1918), Milwaukee Nighthawks (1930) and Memphis Tigers (1930).) Towards the end of his career, he was described in the Pottsville Republican as a "former member of practically every team in the professional circuit". Jerry Roberts described Voss's career as being "as illustrative as any of the vagabond player's fate in those volatile NFL times, when teams folded sometimes in mid-season". By the time of his retirement, all but three (Green Bay Packers, New York Giants, Chicago Bears) of the NFL teams he played for had folded. Voss's 10 NFL teams played for remains an all-time record, since tied by Shayne Graham and Nick Vannett. However, the NFL was much smaller during the time of Voss's career. He is credited by Pro Football Archives as having appeared in 94 games, 88 as a starter, while Pro Football Reference credits him with 95 appearances and the same number of starts. He scored a total of 10 touchdowns in the NFL, seven receiving, two on fumble returns, and one rushing. Voss also tallied nine extra points, finishing his NFL career with 69 points scored.

Voss was an early star of the NFL and a four-time All-Pro honoree. He stood at 6 feet 3 inches (1.91 m) during his professional career and weighed 207 pounds (94 kg), being "one of the larger players of the 1920s". At the peak of his career, he was regarded as one of the greatest ends in football. Voss was considered particularly talented as a receiver in the NFL's early days and was known for his speed and aggressiveness. He was also a top performer on defense and special teams. Voss's speed came despite him being one of the larger players in the league, and The Daily Times reported him to be "as fast as an ordinary college sprinter", while noting he had the ability to "play end, tackle, guard or fullback with an equal degree of skill". Another report, in describing his profile in college, said Voss was "sturdy" and appeared "like a battering ram. He is of powerful build and his ability to force his way through the line has won many a game for Detroit." He was noted in The News-Messenger to be "one bunch of beef that moves rapidly and to a certain point and his path is strewn with human wreckage whenever he starts down the line with the [football]."

== Professional basketball career ==
=== 1921–1925: Early career ===
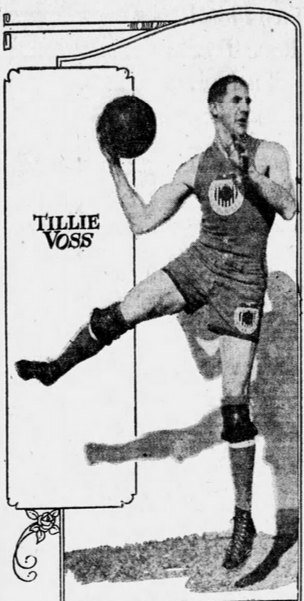
Voss with the basketball

In November 1921, Voss signed to play center for the Fort Wayne Caseys, a Knights of Columbus team which was defending middle west basketball champions. The following month, he also joined the Detroit Kelly Greens, becoming one of their top scorers and serving as team captain. He spent the 1921–22 season with both clubs, playing for Fort Wayne on days when Detroit did not have games; in February 1922, Voss played for the Kelly Greens against the Caseys and was leading the scorer in a Detroit victory. He set team scoring records for Detroit and, according to local newspapers, was regarded as the best center in all of basketball. Voss helped the team to the Michigan state title by defeating the 11-time defending champion Detroit Rayls, his former team.

The Muskegon Chronicle remarked that Voss was "undoubtedly the greatest drawing card in the middle west", stating that his presence alone could "pack the Y[MCA] gym to the doors", and Columbia University athletic director Tom Thorp said that he was even more talented at basketball than football. With Fort Wayne, Voss helped the Caseys defeat the national champion Original Celtics, and he also was a member of a team known as the Omars towards the end of the season. In total, for the Caseys, he scored 126 points and scored in all but one game.

Voss re-signed with Fort Wayne in November 1922 and also played with the Kelly Greens again during the 1922–23 season; the Kelly Greens were renamed the Detroit Jerry McCarthys. He also spent time with the American Oils team of Jackson, Michigan, and was a member of a Delco team for their game against the claimed world champion Original Celtics. Voss returned to Fort Wayne for the 1923–24 season as a guard on a contract stipulating he only play for them; nevertheless in December 1923 he was loaned for a game to the Detroit Red Arrows for their game against the Hewitts of Buffalo, New York, which they won 53–33. He helped Fort Wayne to a victory in a series over the Original Celtics for the claimed world championship and was second on the team in scoring with over 200 points. Later in the season, Voss also returned to the McCarthys and played for the Milwaukee Badgers. He was Milwaukee's top player in a victory over the Celtics.

Voss did not return to Fort Wayne for the 1924–25 season and instead played for Detroit Pulaski, a team sponsored by the American Legion; the McCarthys, his other former team, had folded after the prior season. He served as Detroit Pulaski's captain and led them to wins over many prominent teams, including the Celtics, New York Kingstons and Cleveland Rosenblums. Towards the end of the season, he also made appearances for an American Legion team from Port Clinton, Ohio, and the Consumers Power team of Jackson, Michigan.

=== 1925–1930: ABL founding and later career ===
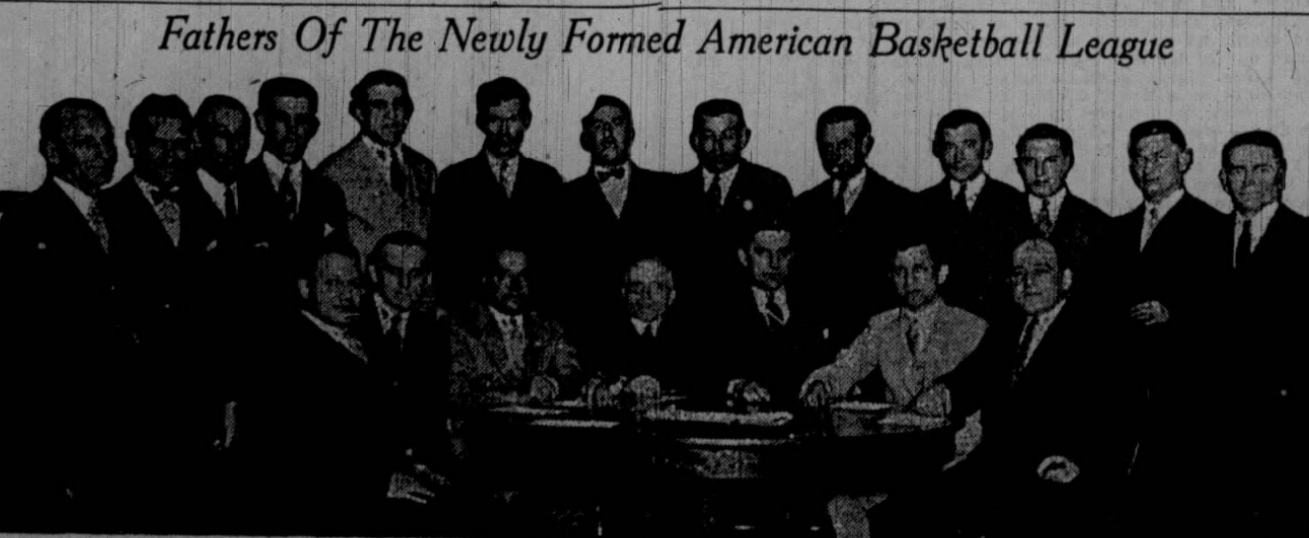
Founders of the American Basketball League; Voss is standing, fifth from the left

Voss was one of the founders of the American Basketball League (ABL) and attended the meeting which established the league on April 25, 1925, in Cleveland, Ohio. He was a delegate representing Detroit Pulaski and was active in league meetings. In the 1925–26 season, Voss served as player-coach for Detroit and was described in some sources as one of the ABL's top centers at the start of the season. However, at the start of February 1926, the team manager suspended him, stating that Voss "failed to gain his true form and fail[ed] to train seriously and adhere to the rules laid down for the other players". He departed the team later that month and joined the Rochester Centrals. After less than a month with Rochester, he was purchased by the Brooklyn Arcadians for the last stretch of the season and was credited by The Brooklyn Daily Times with having significantly improved their performance. Voss helped them to the inaugural ABL championship but Brooklyn lost the series. In total, he appeared in 30 regular season games during the 1925–26 ABL season, scoring a total of 140 points while averaging 4.7 points per game; he also scored nine points in three playoff games.

After the Arcadians folded prior to the 1926–27 season, Voss signed with the Washington Palace Five in December 1926, a team owned by George Preston Marshall. In January, it was announced he was soon to be released due to disappointing play; however, immediately after, he had a top performance against the Fort Wayne Caseys, including making the game-winning shot, and the team withdrew the waivers that had been placed on him. The Plain Dealer commented that the initial decision to release Voss "seems to have injected new life into [him]", while The Washington Daily News reported his improvement helped turn the team into a title contender. After placing second in the league in its first half with a record of 16–5, Washington went 14–7 in the second half of the 1926–27 ABL season and placed third in the league. Voss appeared in 31 games for the Palace Five, scoring 144 points, an average of 4.6 points per game. He was selected by the New York Daily News as a second-team All-ABL player for the season.

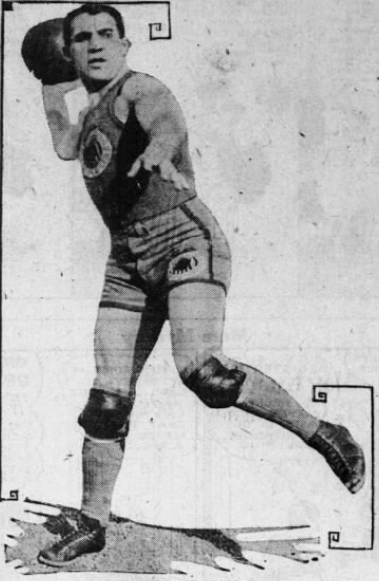
Voss in 1927

Following the season, Voss was involved in what was then the biggest trade in ABL history, with three players from Washington, including him, being sent to the Philadelphia Warriors in exchange for three players. However, at his request, he was sold from Philadelphia to the Detroit Cardinals before the 1927–28 season, missing some games early in the season due to a broken hand. At the start of January 1928, Detroit folded, and he then moved to the Fort Wayne Hoosiers. He only briefly played for the Hoosiers before joining the Chicago Bruins, serving as a key player in his team debut, a win against Rochester. In total, Voss appeared in 27 games for three teams during the 1927–28 season, scoring 44 points, an average of 1.6 per game.

Voss played a second season for the Bruins in 1928–29, although he was a backup, spent some time injured, and was reported as "not what he used to be". In 27 games, he scored only 40 points, averaging 1.5 points per game. Voss spent a final season in Chicago in 1929–30 as a substitute and utility player. He posted a career-low 36 points, 1.1 per game, in 32 appearances for the Bruins, and did not return to basketball in 1930–31.

=== Player profile ===
Voss was a member of seven ABL teams in five seasons and played for numerous other independent teams in his basketball career. His appearances with numerous ABL and NFL teams led one paper to dub him the "world champion globe trotter in sports", while another said that he "has probably played with more different professional teams ... than any other big league man". In his ABL career, he appeared in 147 games, scoring 404 points on 131 field goals and 142 free throws. His points per game in the ABL stood at 2.7, although his seasons in the ABL came towards the end of his career. At his best, he was regarded as one of the best centers nationally, as well as one of the best overall players in the west and in the country. Voss was described in one source as the Babe Ruth of basketball.

At 6 feet 3 inches (1.91 m) and over 200 pounds (91 kg), Voss was large for a basketball player of his era, with local newspapers stating that his size had given him an advantage in the sport. He was often used by his teams on tip-offs. As in football, Voss was known for his speed, despite his size, with one paper calling him "the fastest big man in the game". He was considered an "ideal leader on the court" and according to the Detroit Free Press, he was one of the most valuable players for his team because of his "speed, weight, height, knowledge of the game, and willingness to bury himself for the team". The Belvidere Daily Republican praised his shooting abilities and said that, "He attempts few from a distance, but the ball in his hands in his favorite under the basket position – running or standing – is two points certain."

Voss also played baseball and at times competed in other sports. He has been described in some sources as one of the greatest athletes in the history of Detroit, while one contemporary source also called him one of the greatest all-around athletes in the U.S.

== Personal life ==
During his athletic career, Voss also worked as a lifeguard at Detroit beaches during summers. One newspaper commented that, "If ever a being bore the appearances of what a life guard [sic] ought to be, 'Tillie' does". Following his retirement from professional football, Voss served one season as an assistant to head coach Harry Hobbs for the Toronto Varsity Blues, a collegiate Canadian football team. After briefly working with the team, he attracted criticism from local commentators after remarking that "Canadians don't know very much about the art of playing football". After a loss to the Queen's Gaels in October 1931, he left Toronto and returned home. The Globe and Mail commented that while he was unsuccessful in teaching Toronto how to effectively use the passing game, "he did improve the work of the wingline in respect to interference, and it may be that his instruction will bear more fruit in the games to come".

After his career, Voss said that he thought he "would have been much further ahead had he devoted less time and energy to [football]." He said that "football is a great game in its proper place. It is all right for a young man to play for his college. But ... too many young men ... are trying to make football their life's work, and are living to regret it." In 1939, Voss played for a Detroit alumni team and scored a touchdown in a spring training game against the university's active football team. Voss worked for a Works Progress Administration (WPA) program and was a district supervisor in Detroit. In 1940, he was seriously injured after being stabbed when he intervened in a fight between two other employees.

Voss married and had a daughter, Marjory, who also attended the University of Detroit. He later worked for the welfare department in Wayne County, Michigan. He lived in Dearborn before moving to Stuart, Florida, where he lived for the remainder of his life. He died there on December 14, 1975, at the age of 79. Voss was posthumously inducted into the University of Detroit's Sports Hall of Fame in 1978.

== See also ==
- List of NFL players by most teams played for
