= 1913 Detroit Heralds season =

Sports season

- Head coach: Bill Marshall
- Home stadium: Mack Park

Results
- Record: 7–0

The 1913 Detroit Heralds season was the ninth season for the Detroit Heralds, an independent American football team. Led by coach Bill Marshall, the team compiled a 7–0 record, shut out seven opponents, and allowed only six points during the entire season. In addition to playing teams from within the State of Michigan, the 1913 Heralds also played and defeated teams from Canada (the Windsor Independents), Ohio (the Cleveland Tomahawks), and Illinois (Eckersall's Maroons from Chicago).

The Heralds' undefeated season in 1913 was followed by a second consecutive undefeated season in 1914, a winning streak that lasted 17 games.

== Schedule ==
| Date | Opponent | Site | Result | Attendance | Source |
|---|---|---|---|---|---|
| October 12 | Windsor Independents | Mack Park; Detroit | W 7–0 | 1,200 | |
| October 19 | Adrian Independents | Mack Park; Detroit | W 75–0 | | |
| October 26 | Cleveland Tomahawks | Mack Park; Detroit | W 13–0 | | |
| November 2 | Argonauts | Mack Park; Detroit | W 7–0 | | |
| November 9 | Eckersall's Maroons | Detroit | W 19–0 | | |
| November 30 | Greys | Mack Park; Detroit | W 14–0 | | |
| December 7 | Wolverines | Mack Park; Detroit | W 16–6 | 2,200 | |

== Players ==
The team's players included the following, those players with at least four starts shown in bold:

- Allen - started 3 games at end
- Cheney - started 1 game at tackle
- **Fogel** - started 3 games at tackle, 3 games at halfback
- Hoffman - started 1 game at guard
- Houck - started 1 game at fullback, started 1 game at guard, 1 game at tackle
- Jacobs - started 1 game at end
- **Lingrel** - started 3 games at guard, 3 games at end
- Birtie Maher - started 1 game at quarterback, 1 game at end
- **Mauer** - started 4 games at halfback, 1 game at fullback
- **Moran** - started all 7 games at center
- Lawrence Nadeau - started 1 game at halfback
- Neumann - started 1 game at guard
- **Runkel** - started 6 games at tackle, 1 game at halfback
- **Schaeffer** - started 3 games at halfback, 1 game at end
- **Seubert** - started 4 games at fullback, 2 games at halfback
- **R. "Dick" Shields** - started 5 games at end, 1 game at fullback; also served as a team captain
- **G. Shields** - started 3 games at guard, 2 games at tackle
- Watson - started 1 game at tackle
- **Perce Wilson** - started 6 games at quarterback
- **Wayne** - started 5 games at guard
