= 1910 Detroit Heralds season =

- Head coach: Bill Marshall
- Home stadium: Mack Park

Results
- Record: 3–0

The 1910 Detroit Heralds season was the sixth season of independent American football played by the Detroit Heralds. The team was coached by Bill Marshall and compiled a 3–0 record.

The team's lineup included Birtie Maher (end), Polly La Grue (quarterback), Lawrence Nadeau (fullback), and Sylvester "Ole" Mauer (halfback).

== Schedule ==
Date	Opponent	Site	Result	Attendance	Source
November 6	Walkerville	Belle Isle; Detroit			
November 13	Redeemers		W 45–0		
November 20	Orioles	Mack Park; Detroit	W 42–0	1,000	
November 27	Argonauts	Mack Park; Detroit	W 26–0		
