= List of NFL players by most teams played for =

This is a list of National Football League (NFL) players by most teams played for, with a minimum of seven. Players on this list must have appeared in at least one regular season or postseason game for each of their teams. This also includes teams from the American Football League (AFL) and All-America Football Conference (AAFC). (Note: The NFL began recognizing AAFC statistics in 2025.)

== List ==
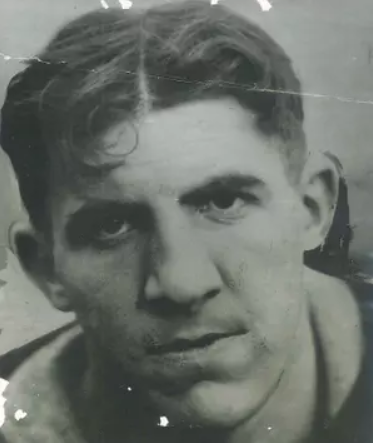
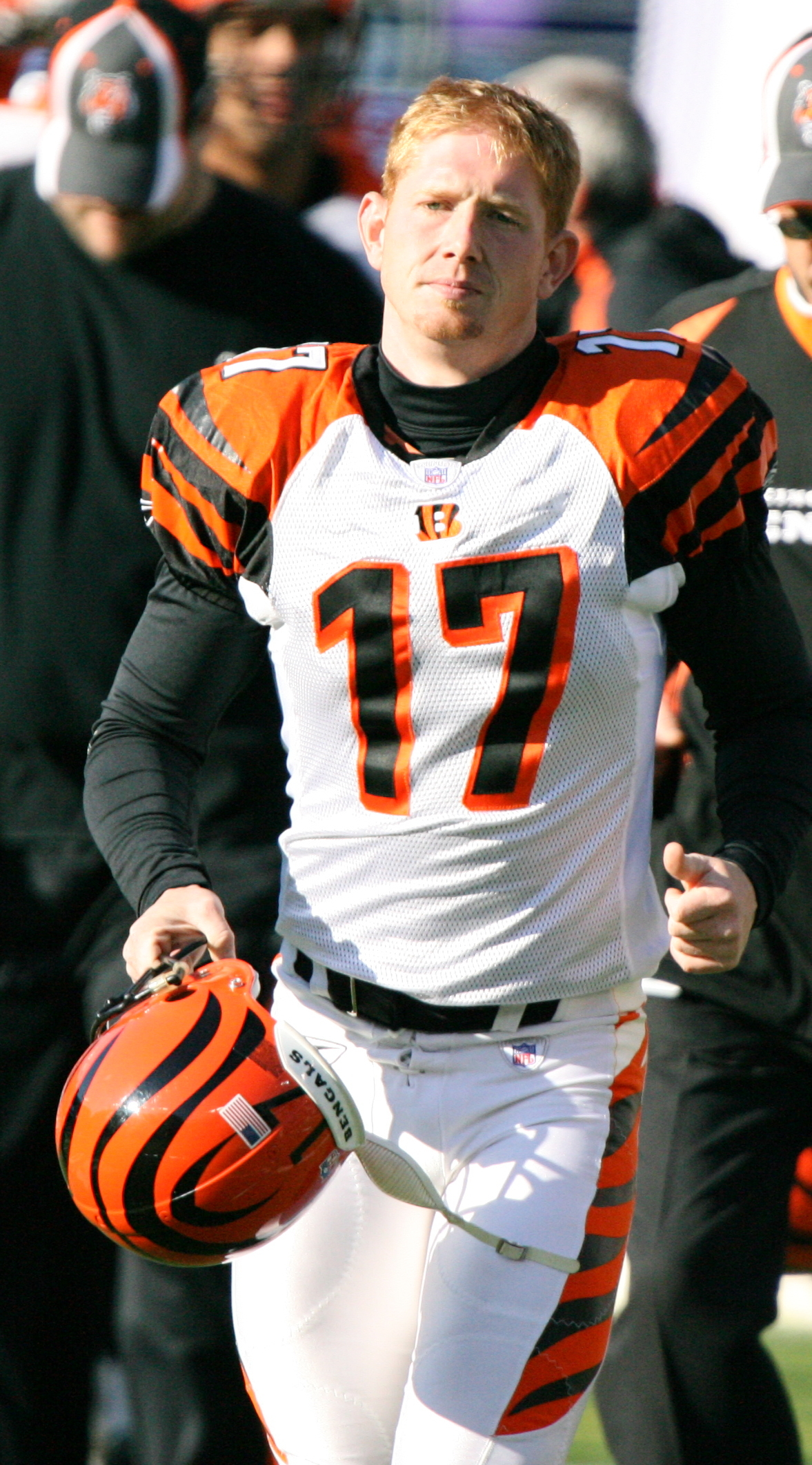
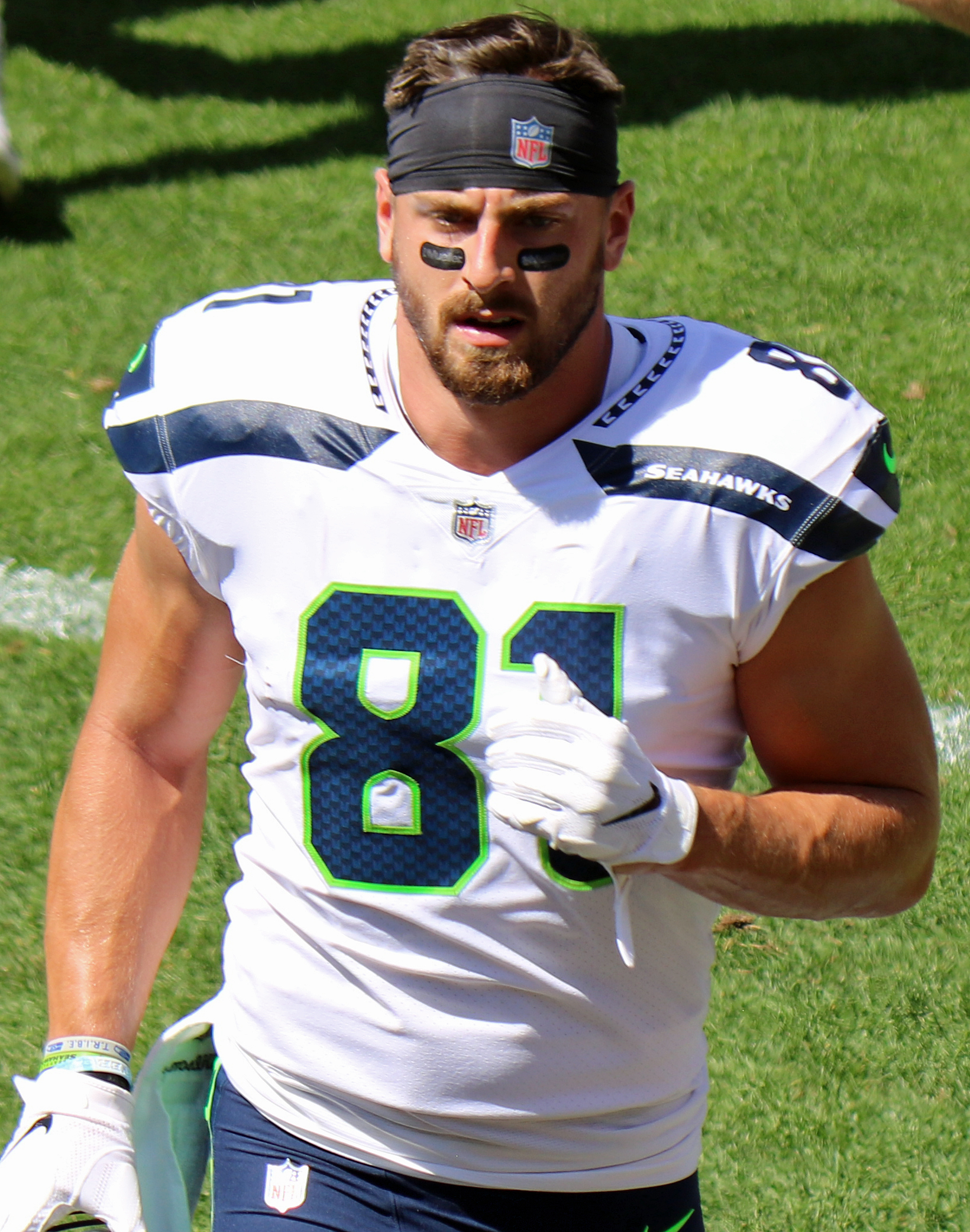
Tillie Voss, Shayne Graham, and Nick Vannett are tied for the most NFL teams played for with ten.
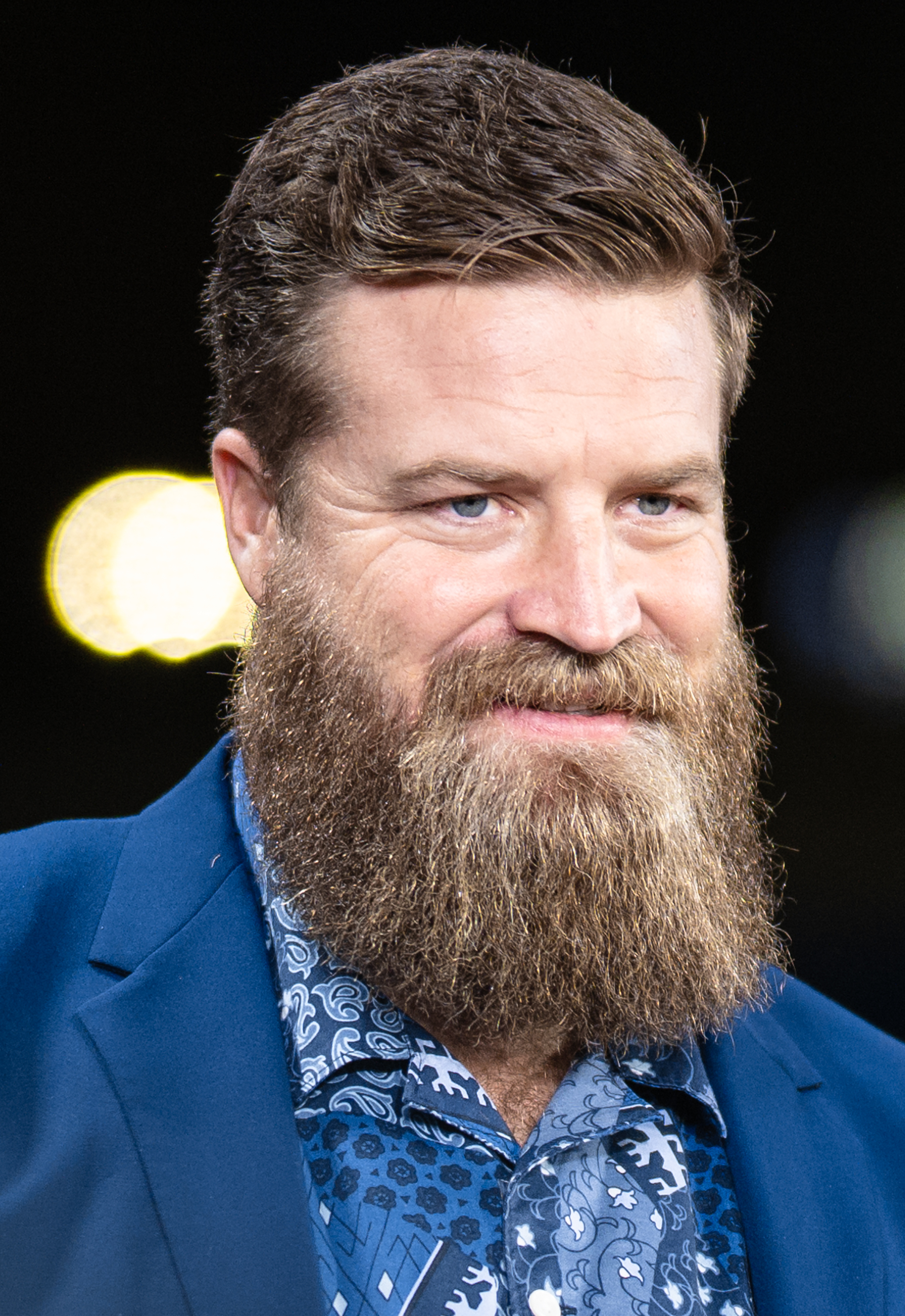
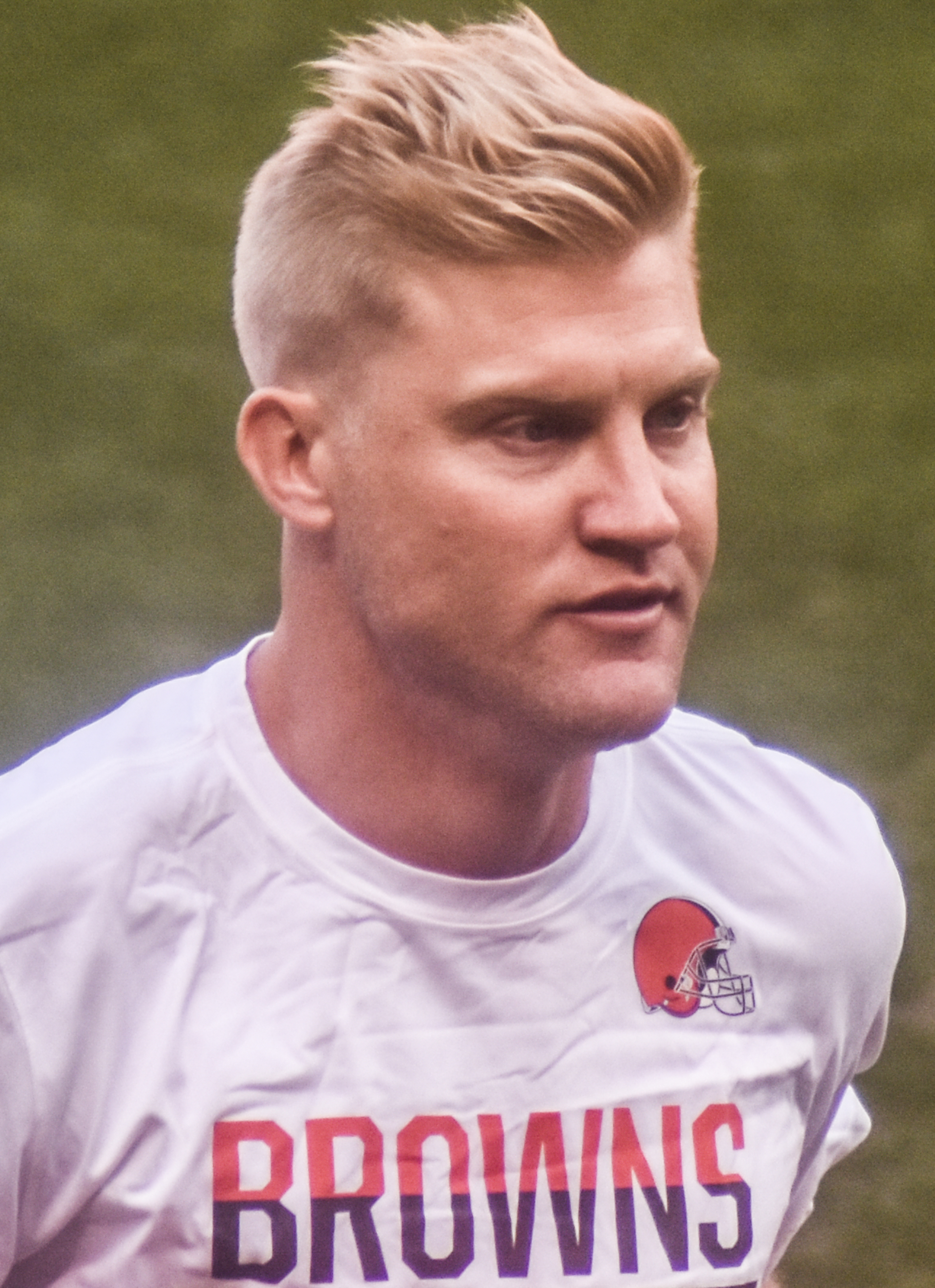
Ryan Fitzpatrick and Josh McCown are tied for the most NFL teams played for, among quarterbacks, with nine.

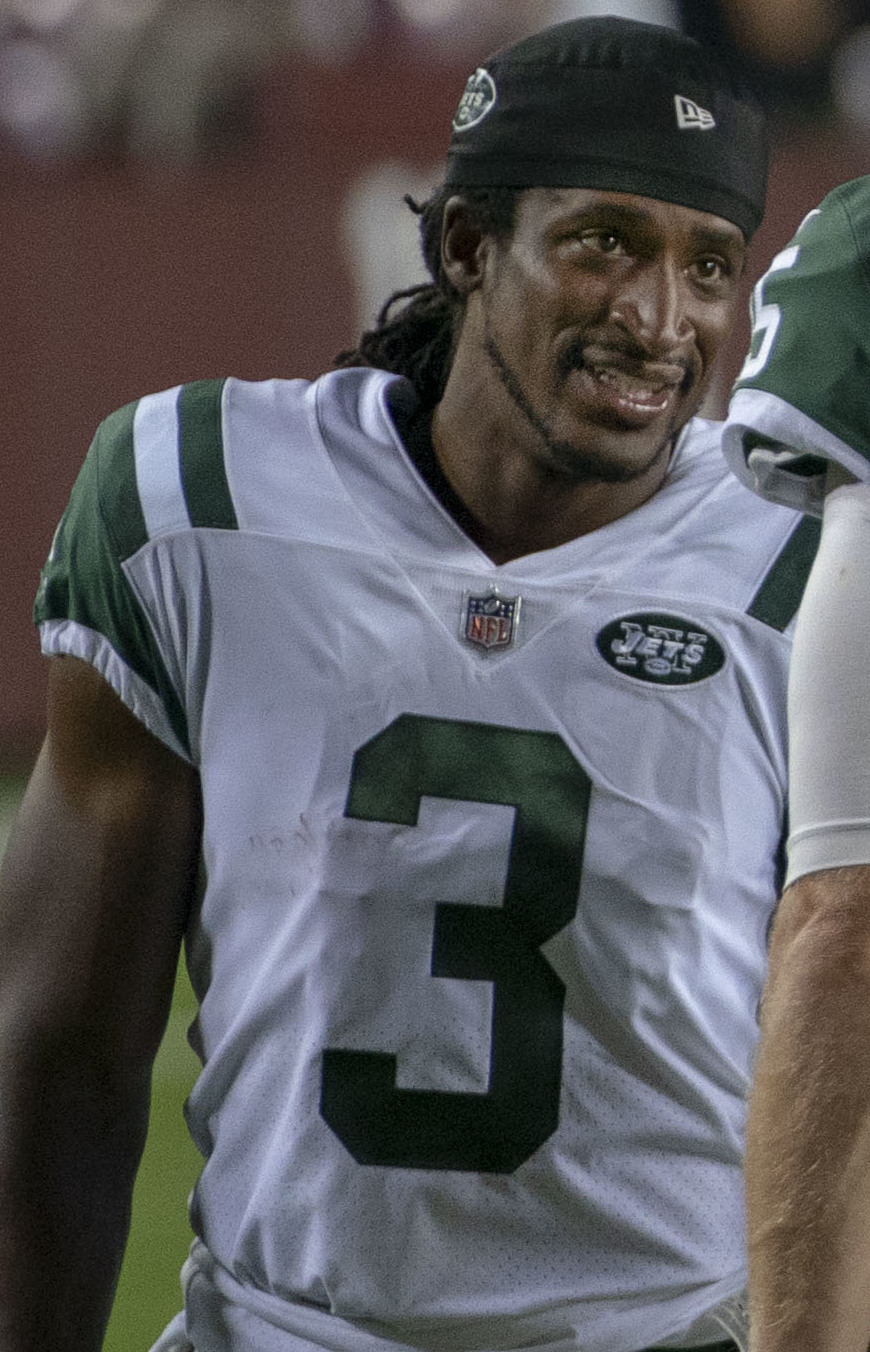
Andre Roberts played for nine NFL teams, the most in league history for a wide receiver or return specialist.

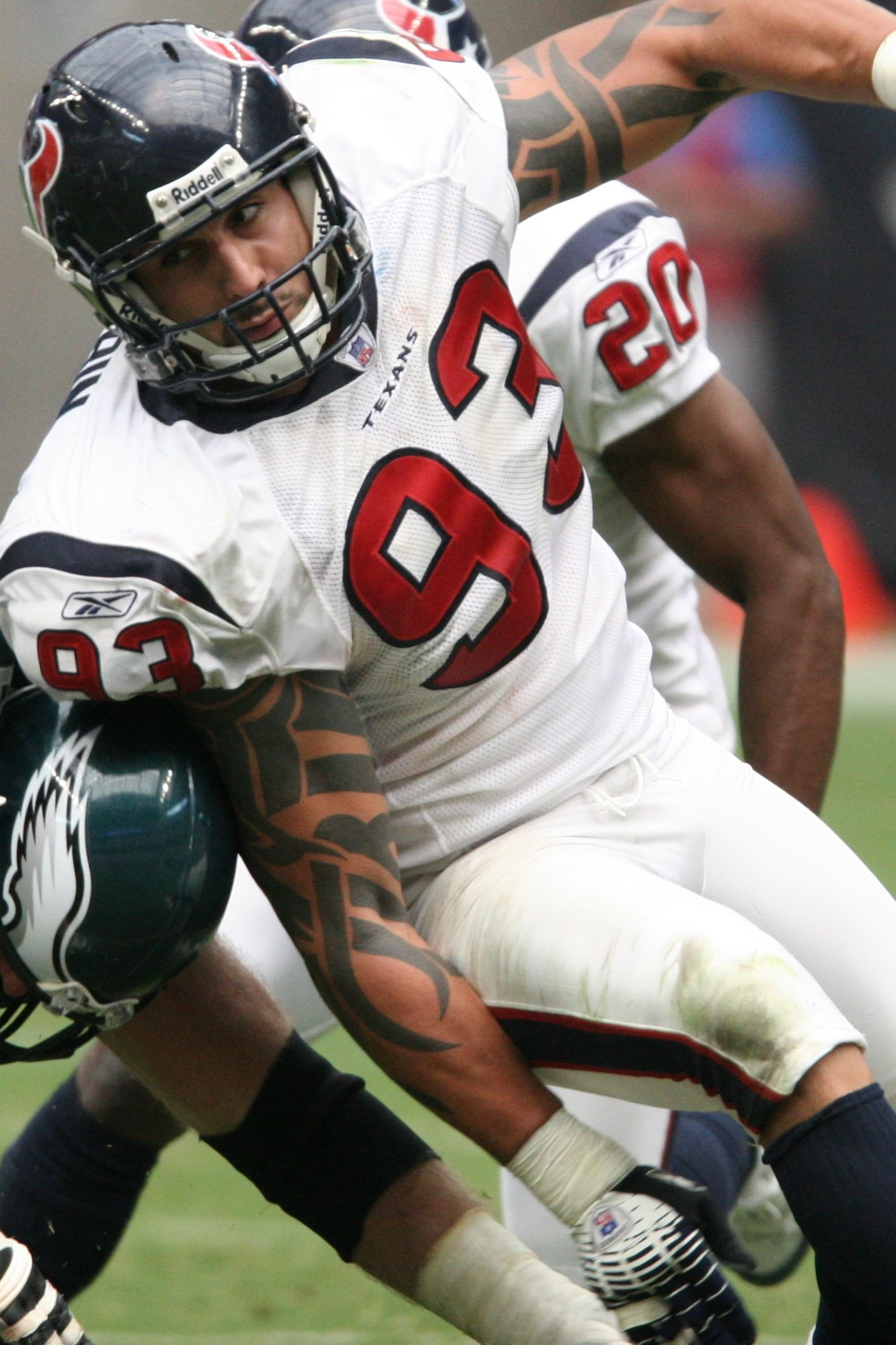
Jason Babin played for nine NFL teams, the most in league history for a defensive lineman or linebacker.

Legend
Symbol	Meaning
†	Pro Football Hall of Famer
^	Active

Player	Position(s)	No. of teams	Years	Teams
Tillie Voss	End, tackle	10	1921–1929	Detroit Tigers (1921); Buffalo All-Americans (1921); Rock Island Independents (1922); Akron Pros (1922); Toledo Maroons (1923); Green Bay Packers (1924); Detroit Panthers (1925); New York Giants (1926); Chicago Bears (1927–1928); Dayton Triangles (1929); Buffalo Bisons (1929) (Note: The early Buffalo NFL teams were one franchise.)
Shayne Graham	Placekicker	10	2001–2015	Buffalo Bills (2001); Carolina Panthers (2002); Cincinnati Bengals (2003–2009); New York Giants (2010); New England Patriots (2010); Miami Dolphins (2011); Baltimore Ravens (2011); Houston Texans (2012); New Orleans Saints (2013–2014); Atlanta Falcons (2015)
Nick Vannett^	Tight end	10	2016–present	Seattle Seahawks (2016–2019); Pittsburgh Steelers (2019); Denver Broncos (2020); New Orleans Saints (2021–2022); New York Giants (2022); Los Angeles Chargers (2023); Tennessee Titans (2024); Minnesota Vikings (2025); Los Angeles Rams (2025); Baltimore Ravens (2026)
Jim Kendrick	End	9	1922–1927	Toledo Maroons (1922); Canton Bulldogs (1922); Louisville Brecks (1923); Chicago Bears (1924); Hammond Pros (1925); Buffalo Bisons (1925); Rochester Jeffersons (1925); Rock Island Independents (1925); Buffalo Rangers (1926); New York Giants (1927)
Ben Agajanian	Placekicker	9	1945–1964	Philadelphia Eagles (1945); Pittsburgh Steelers (1945); Los Angeles Dons (1947–1948); New York Giants (1949); Los Angeles Rams (1953); New York Giants (1954–1957); Los Angeles Chargers (1960); Dallas Texans (1961); Green Bay Packers (1961); Oakland Raiders (1962); San Diego Chargers (1964)
Josh McCown	Quarterback	9	2002–2019	Arizona Cardinals (2002–2005); Detroit Lions (2006); Oakland Raiders (2007); Carolina Panthers (2008–2009); Chicago Bears (2011, 2013); Tampa Bay Buccaneers (2014); Cleveland Browns (2015–2016); New York Jets (2017–2018); Philadelphia Eagles (2019)
Jason Babin	Defensive end, linebacker	9	2004–2015	Houston Texans (2004–2006); Seattle Seahawks (2007–2008); Kansas City Chiefs (2008); Philadelphia Eagles (2009); Tennessee Titans (2010); Philadelphia Eagles (2011–2012); Jacksonville Jaguars (2012–2013); New York Jets (2014); Baltimore Ravens (2015); Arizona Cardinals (2015)
Ryan Fitzpatrick	Quarterback	9	2005–2021	St. Louis Rams (2005–2006); Cincinnati Bengals (2007–2008); Buffalo Bills (2009–2012); Tennessee Titans (2013); Houston Texans (2014); New York Jets (2015–2016); Tampa Bay Buccaneers (2017–2018); Miami Dolphins (2019–2020); Washington Football Team (2021)
Andre Roberts	Wide receiver, return specialist	9	2010–2022	Arizona Cardinals (2010–2013); Washington Redskins (2014–2015); Detroit Lions (2016); Atlanta Falcons (2017); New York Jets (2018); Buffalo Bills (2019–2020); Houston Texans (2021); Los Angeles Chargers (2021); Carolina Panthers (2022)
Les Caywood	Guard, tackle	8	1926–1934	Buffalo Rangers (1926); Cleveland Bulldogs (1927); Pottsville Maroons (1927); New York Giants (1927); Detroit Wolverines (1928); New York Giants (1929–1931); Chicago Cardinals (1931); Brooklyn Dodgers (1932); New York Giants (1932); Cincinnati Reds (1933–1934)
Mark Royals	Punter	8	1987–2003	St. Louis Cardinals (1987); Philadelphia Eagles (1987); Tampa Bay Buccaneers (1990–1991); Pittsburgh Steelers (1992–1994); Detroit Lions (1995–1996); New Orleans Saints (1997–1998); Tampa Bay Buccaneers (1999–2001); Miami Dolphins (2002–2003); Jacksonville Jaguars (2003)
Karl Wilson	Defensive lineman	8	1987–1995	San Diego Chargers (1987–1988); Phoenix Cardinals (1989); Miami Dolphins (1990); Los Angeles Rams (1991); New York Jets (1992–1993); Miami Dolphins (1993); San Francisco 49ers (1993); Tampa Bay Buccaneers (1994); Buffalo Bills (1995)
Jeff Brady	Linebacker	8	1991–1999	Pittsburgh Steelers (1991); Green Bay Packers (1992); Los Angeles Rams (1993); San Diego Chargers (1993); Tampa Bay Buccaneers (1994); Minnesota Vikings (1995–1997); Carolina Panthers (1998); Indianapolis Colts (1999)
Dave Rayner	Placekicker	8	2005–2011	Indianapolis Colts (2005); Green Bay Packers (2006); Kansas City Chiefs (2007); San Diego Chargers (2007); Cincinnati Bengals (2008); Detroit Lions (2010); Oakland Raiders (2011); Buffalo Bills (2011)
Mike Nugent	Placekicker	8	2005–2020	New York Jets (2005–2008); Tampa Bay Buccaneers (2009); Arizona Cardinals (2009); Cincinnati Bengals (2010–2016); Dallas Cowboys (2017); Chicago Bears (2017); Oakland Raiders (2018); New England Patriots (2019); Arizona Cardinals (2020)
Micheal Spurlock	Wide receiver	8	2006–2014	Arizona Cardinals (2006); Tampa Bay Buccaneers (2007); San Francisco 49ers (2009); Tampa Bay Buccaneers (2009–2011); San Diego Chargers (2012); Jacksonville Jaguars (2012); San Diego Chargers (2012); Detroit Lions (2013); Dallas Cowboys (2013); Detroit Lions (2013); Chicago Bears (2014)
Brian Hoyer	Quarterback	8	2009–2023	New England Patriots (2009–2011); Arizona Cardinals (2012); Cleveland Browns (2013–2014); Houston Texans (2015); Chicago Bears (2016); San Francisco 49ers (2017); New England Patriots (2017–2018); Indianapolis Colts (2019); New England Patriots (2020–2022); Las Vegas Raiders (2023)
Crezdon Butler	Defensive back	8	2010–2016	Pittsburgh Steelers (2010); Arizona Cardinals (2011); Washington Redskins (2012); Arizona Cardinals (2012); Buffalo Bills (2012); San Diego Chargers (2013); Tampa Bay Buccaneers (2014); Seattle Seahawks (2015); Detroit Lions (2015–2016)
Tyrod Taylor^	Quarterback	8	2011–present	Baltimore Ravens (2011–2014); Buffalo Bills (2015–2017); Cleveland Browns (2018); Los Angeles Chargers (2019–2020); Houston Texans (2021); New York Giants (2022–2023); New York Jets (2024–2025); Green Bay Packers (2026–present)
Marshall Newhouse	Offensive tackle	8	2011–2020	Green Bay Packers (2010–2013); Cincinnati Bengals (2014); New York Giants (2015–2016); Oakland Raiders (2017); Buffalo Bills (2018); Carolina Panthers (2018); New England Patriots (2019); Tennessee Titans (2020)
Terrell McClain	Defensive lineman	8	2011–2019	Carolina Panthers (2011); New England Patriots (2012); Houston Texans (2012–2013); Dallas Cowboys (2014–2016); Washington Redskins (2017); Atlanta Falcons (2018); Kansas City Chiefs (2019); Oakland Raiders (2019)
Case Keenum^	Quarterback	8	2013–present	Houston Texans (2013–2014); St. Louis / Los Angeles Rams (2015–2016); Minnesota Vikings (2017); Denver Broncos (2018); Washington Redskins (2019); Cleveland Browns (2020–2021); Buffalo Bills (2022); Houston Texans (2023); Chicago Bears (2026–present)
Akeem Spence	Defensive tackle	8	2013–2022	Tampa Bay Buccaneers (2013–2016); Detroit Lions (2017); Miami Dolphins (2018); Philadelphia Eagles (2019); Jacksonville Jaguars (2019); New England Patriots (2020); Washington Football Team (2021); San Francisco 49ers (2022)
Ray-Ray Armstrong	Linebacker	8	2013–2020	St. Louis Rams (2013–2014); Oakland Raiders (2014–2015); San Francisco 49ers (2015–2017); New York Giants (2017–2018); Cleveland Browns (2018); New Orleans Saints (2019); Dallas Cowboys (2019); Seattle Seahawks (2020)
Cassius Marsh	Linebacker	8	2014–2021	Seattle Seahawks (2014–2016); New England Patriots (2017); San Francisco 49ers (2017–2018); Arizona Cardinals (2019); Jacksonville Jaguars (2020); Indianapolis Colts (2020); Pittsburgh Steelers (2020); Chicago Bears (2021)
Patrick Omameh	Offensive guard	8	2014–2021	Tampa Bay Buccaneers (2013–2014); Chicago Bears (2015); Jacksonville Jaguars (2016–2017); New York Giants (2018); Jacksonville Jaguars (2018); New Orleans Saints (2019); Las Vegas Raiders (2020); New Orleans Saints (2020); Kansas City Chiefs (2020); Carolina Panthers (2021)
Eric Saubert^	Tight end	8	2017–present	Atlanta Falcons (2017–2018); Chicago Bears (2019–2020); Jacksonville Jaguars (2020); Denver Broncos (2021–2022); Dallas Cowboys (2023); Houston Texans (2023); San Francisco 49ers (2024); Seattle Seahawks (2025–present)
Jacob Martin^	Defensive end	8	2018–present	Seattle Seahawks (2018); Houston Texans (2019–2021); New York Jets (2022); Denver Broncos (2022); Indianapolis Colts (2023); Chicago Bears (2024); Washington Commanders (2025); Tennessee Titans (2026–present)
DeAndre Carter^	Wide receiver / Return specialist	8	2018–present	Philadelphia Eagles (2018); Houston Texans (2018–2020); Chicago Bears (2020); Washington Football Team (2021); Los Angeles Chargers (2022); Las Vegas Raiders (2023); Chicago Bears (2024); Cleveland Browns (2025); Detroit Lions (2026–present)
Matthew Wright	Placekicker	8	2020–2025	Pittsburgh Steelers (2020); Jacksonville Jaguars (2021); Kansas City Chiefs (2022); Pittsburgh Steelers (2022); Carolina Panthers (2023); San Francisco 49ers (2024); Kansas City Chiefs (2024); Tennessee Titans (2024); Tennessee Titans (2025); Washington Commanders (2025); Houston Texans (2025)
Al Pierotti	Center	7	1920–1929	Akron Pros (1920); Cleveland Tigers (1920); New York Brickley Giants (1921); Milwaukee Badgers (1922); Racine Legion (1923); Milwaukee Badgers (1923–1924); Providence Steamrollers (1927); Boston Bulldogs (1929)
Joe Guyon†	Tackle, halfback	7	1920–1927	Canton Bulldogs (1920); Washington Senators (1921); Cleveland Indians (1921); Oorang Indians (1922–1923); Rock Island Independents (1924); Kansas City Cowboys (1925); New York Giants (1927)
Art Garvey	Lineman	7	1922–1931	Chicago Bears (1922–1923); Brooklyn Lions (1926); Hartford Blues (1926); New York Giants (1927–1928); Providence Steam Roller (1929); Brooklyn Dodgers (1930); Staten Island Stapletons (1931)
Dick Stahlman	Offensive lineman	7	1924–1933	Akron Pros (1924); Hammond Pros (1924); Kansas City Blues (1924); Kenosha Maroons (1924); Akron Pros (1925); New York Giants 1927); New York Giants (1930); Green Bay Packers (1931–1932); Chicago Bears (1933)
Dutch Webber	Running back	7	1924–1930	Kansas City Blues-Cowboys (1924–1925); Cleveland Bulldogs (1925); Hartford Blues (1926); New York Giants (1926); Kansas City Cowboys (1926); Cleveland Bulldogs (1927); Green Bay Packers (1928); Providence Steam Roller (1930); Newark Tornadoes (1930)
Jack McArthur	Center	7	1926–1931	Los Angeles Buccaneers (1926); New York Yankees (1927); Buffalo Bisons (1927); New York Yankees (1928); Orange Tornadoes (1929); Frankford Yellow Jackets (1930); Newark Tornadoes (1930); Brooklyn Dodgers (1930); Providence Steamroller (1930–1931)
Hardy Brown	Linebacker, defensive back, fullback	7	1948–1960	Brooklyn Dodgers (1948); Chicago Hornets (1949); Baltimore Colts (1950); Washington Redskins (1950); San Francisco 49ers (1951–1955); Chicago Cardinals (1956); Denver Broncos (1960)
Eddie Murray	Placekicker	7	1980–2000	Detroit Lions (1980–1991); Kansas City Chiefs (1992); Tampa Bay Buccaneers (1992); Dallas Cowboys (1993); Philadelphia Eagles (1994); Washington Redskins (1995); Minnesota Vikings (1997); Dallas Cowboys (1999); Washington Redskins (2000)
Adam Schreiber	Center, long snapper	7	1984–1999	Seattle Seahawks (1984); New Orleans Saints (1985); Philadelphia Eagles (1986–1988); New York Jets (1988–1989); Minnesota Vikings (1990–1993); New York Giants (1994–1996); Atlanta Falcons (1997–1999)
Steve Bono	Quarterback	7	1985–1999	Minnesota Vikings (1985–1986); Pittsburgh Steelers (1987–1988); San Francisco 49ers (1989–1993); Kansas City Chiefs (1994–1996); Green Bay Packers (1997); St. Louis Rams (1998); Carolina Panthers (1999)
Tim McKyer	Cornerback	7	1986–1997	San Francisco 49ers (1986–1989); Miami Dolphins (1990); Atlanta Falcons (1991–1992); Detroit Lions (1993); Pittsburgh Steelers (1994); Carolina Panthers (1995); Atlanta Falcons (1996); Denver Broncos (1997)
Vinny Testaverde	Quarterback	7	1987–2007	Tampa Bay Buccaneers (1987–1992); Cleveland Browns (1993–1995); Baltimore Ravens (1996–1997); New York Jets (1998–2003); Dallas Cowboys (2004); New York Jets (2005); New England Patriots (2006); Carolina Panthers (2007)
Mark Rodenhauser	Center, long snapper	7	1987–1999	Chicago Bears (1987); Minnesota Vikings (1989); San Diego Chargers (1990–1991); Chicago Bears (1992); Detroit Lions (1993–1994); Carolina Panthers (1995–1997); Pittsburgh Steelers (1998); Seattle Seahawks (1999)
John Carney	Placekicker	7	1988–2010	Tampa Bay Buccaneers (1987–1989); Los Angeles Rams (1990); San Diego Chargers (1990–2000); New Orleans Saints (2001–2006); Jacksonville Jaguars (2007); Kansas City Chiefs (2007); New York Giants (2008); New Orleans Saints (2009–2010)
Chris Chandler	Quarterback	7	1988–2004	Indianapolis Colts (1988–1989); Tampa Bay Buccaneers (1990–1991); Phoenix Cardinals (1991–1993); Los Angeles Rams (1994); Houston Oilers (1995–1996); Atlanta Falcons (1997–2001); Chicago Bears (2002–2003); St. Louis Rams (2004)
Tom Tupa	Punter, quarterback	7	1988–2004	Phoenix Cardinals (1988–1991); Indianapolis Colts (1992); Cleveland Browns (1993–1995); New England Patriots (1996–1998); New York Jets (1999–2001); Tampa Bay Buccaneers (2002–2003); Washington Redskins (2004–2005)
Eric Metcalf	Running back, wide receiver, return specialist	7	1989–2002	Cleveland Browns (1989–1994); Atlanta Falcons (1995–1996); San Diego Chargers (1997); Arizona Cardinals (1998); Carolina Panthers (1999); Washington Redskins (2001); Green Bay Packers (2002)
Andre Rison	Wide receiver	7	1989–2000	Indianapolis Colts (1989); Atlanta Falcons (1990–1994); Cleveland Browns (1995); Jacksonville Jaguars (1996); Green Bay Packers (1996); Kansas City Chiefs (1997–1999); Oakland Raiders (2000)
Tim Hauck	Defensive back	7	1990–2002	New England Patriots (1990); Green Bay Packers (1991–1994); Denver Broncos (1995–1996); Seattle Seahawks (1997); Indianapolis Colts (1998); Philadelphia Eagles (1999–2002); San Francisco 49ers (2002)
Ted Washington	Nose tackle	7	1991–2007	San Francisco 49ers (1991–1993); Denver Broncos (1994); Buffalo Bills (1995–2000); Chicago Bears (2005–2002); New England Patriots (2003); Oakland Raiders (2004–2005); Cleveland Browns (2006–2007)
Jeff Blake	Quarterback	7	1992–2005	New York Jets (1992–1993); Cincinnati Bengals (1994–1999); New Orleans Saints (2000–2001); Baltimore Ravens (2002); Arizona Cardinals (2003); Philadelphia Eagles (2004); Chicago Bears (2005)
Tom Myslinski	Guard	7	1992–2000	Cleveland Browns (1992); Washington Redskins (1992); Buffalo Bills (1993); Chicago Bears (1993–1994); Jacksonville Jaguars (1995); Pittsburgh Steelers (1996–1997); Indianapolis Colts (1998); Dallas Cowboys (1999); Pittsburgh Steelers (2000)
Jeff Zgonina	Defensive tackle	7	1993–2009	Pittsburgh Steelers (1993–1994); Carolina Panthers (1995); Atlanta Falcons (1996); St. Louis Rams (1997); Indianapolis Colts (1998); St. Louis Rams (1999–2002); Miami Dolphins (2003–2006); Houston Texans (2007–2009)
Lorenzo Neal	Fullback	7	1993–2008	New Orleans Saints (1993–1996); New York Jets (1997); Tampa Bay Buccaneers (1998); Tennessee Titans (1999–2000); Cincinnati Bengals (2001–2002); San Diego Chargers (2003–2007); Baltimore Ravens (2008)
Mitch Berger	Punter	7	1994–2009	Philadelphia Eagles (1994); Minnesota Vikings (1996–2001); St. Louis Rams (2002); New Orleans Saints (2003–2006); Arizona Cardinals (2007); Pittsburgh Steelers (2008); Denver Broncos (2009)
Gus Frerotte	Quarterback	7	1994–2008	Washington Redskins (1994–1998); Detroit Lions (1999); Denver Broncos (2000–2001); Cincinnati Bengals (2002); Minnesota Vikings (2003–2004); Miami Dolphins (2005); St. Louis Rams (2006–2007); Minnesota Vikings (2008)
Doug Brien	Placekicker	7	1994–2005	San Francisco 49ers (1994–1995); New Orleans Saints (1995–2000); Indianapolis Colts (2001); Tampa Bay Buccaneers (2001); Minnesota Vikings (2002); New York Jets (2003–2004); Chicago Bears (2005)
Rob Holmberg	Linebacker	7	1994–2001	Los Angeles/Oakland Raiders (1994–1997); Indianapolis Colts (1998); New York Jets (1998); Minnesota Vikings (1999); New England Patriots (2000–2001); Carolina Panthers (2001); Green Bay Packers (2001)
Joe Nedney	Placekicker	7	1996–2010	Miami Dolphins (1996); Arizona Cardinals (1997–1999); Oakland Raiders (1999); Denver Broncos (2000); Carolina Panthers (2000); Tennessee Titans (2001–2003); San Francisco 49ers (2005–2010)
Steve Martin	Defensive tackle	7	1996–2004	Indianapolis Colts (1996–1998); Philadelphia Eagles (1998–1999); Kansas City Chiefs (2000); New York Jets (2001); New England Patriots (2002); Houston Texans (2003); Minnesota Vikings (2004)
Terry Cousin	Cornerback	7	1997–2008	Chicago Bears (1997–1999); Atlanta Falcons (2000); Miami Dolphins (2001); Carolina Panthers (2002–2003); New York Giants (2004); Jacksonville Jaguars (2005–2007); Cleveland Browns (2008)
José Cortez	Placekicker	7	1999–2005	New York Giants (1999); San Francisco 49ers (2001–2002); Washington Redskins (2002); Minnesota Vikings (2003); (2004); Dallas Cowboys (2005); Philadelphia Eagles (2005); San Francisco 49ers (2005); Indianapolis Colts (2005)
Darian Barnes	Fullback	7	2002–2008	Tampa Bay Buccaneers (2002–2003); Dallas Cowboys (2004); Miami Dolphins (2005–2006); New York Jets (2007); Buffalo Bills (2008); Detroit Lions (2008); New Orleans Saints (2008)
Matt Cassel	Quarterback	7	2005–2018	New England Patriots (2005–2008); Kansas City Chiefs (2009–2012); Minnesota Vikings (2013–2014); Buffalo Bills (2015); Dallas Cowboys (2015); Tennessee Titans (2016–2017); Detroit Lions (2018)
Adrian Peterson	Running back	7	2007–2021	Minnesota Vikings (2007–2016); New Orleans Saints (2017); Arizona Cardinals (2017); Washington Redskins (2018–2019); Detroit Lions (2020); Tennessee Titans (2021); Seattle Seahawks (2021)
Justin Forsett	Running back	7	2008–2016	Seattle Seahawks (2008); Indianapolis Colts (2008); Seattle Seahawks (2008–2011); Houston Texans (2012); Jacksonville Jaguars (2013); Baltimore Ravens (2014–2016); Detroit Lions (2016); Denver Broncos (2016)
Josh Johnson^	Quarterback	7	2009–present	Tampa Bay Buccaneers (2008–2011); Cleveland Browns (2012); Cincinnati Bengals (2013); Washington Redskins (2018); New York Jets (2021); Baltimore Ravens (2021); San Francisco 49ers (2022); Baltimore Ravens (2024); Washington Commanders (2025)
Matthew Mulligan	Tight end	7	2009–2016	New York Jets (2009–2011); St. Louis Rams (2012); New England Patriots (2013); Chicago Bears (2014); Arizona Cardinals (2014); Tennessee Titans (2014); Buffalo Bills (2015); Detroit Lions (2016)
Dekoda Watson	Linebacker	7	2010–2019	Tampa Bay Buccaneers (2010–2013); Jacksonville Jaguars (2014); Dallas Cowboys (2014); New England Patriots (2015); Denver Broncos (2016); San Francisco 49ers (2017–2018); Seattle Seahawks (2019)
Kevin Zeitler^	Offensive guard	7	2012–present	Cincinnati Bengals (2012–2016); Cleveland Browns (2017–2018); New York Giants (2019–2020); Baltimore Ravens (2021–2023); Detroit Lions (2024); Tennessee Titans (2025); Green Bay Packers (2026–present)
Greg Van Roten^	Offensive guard	7	2012–present	Green Bay Packers (2012–2013); Carolina Panthers (2017–2019); New York Jets (2020–2021); Buffalo Bills (2022); Las Vegas Raiders (2023); New York Giants (2024–2025); New England Patriots (2026–present)
Kai Forbath	Placekicker	7	2012–2020	Dallas Cowboys (2011); Washington Redskins (2012–2015); New Orleans Saints (2015); Minnesota Vikings (2016–2017); Jacksonville Jaguars (2018); New England Patriots (2019); Dallas Cowboys (2019); Los Angeles Rams (2020)
John Jenkins^	Defensive tackle	7	2013–present	New Orleans Saints (2013–2016); Seattle Seahawks (2016); Chicago Bears (2017); New York Giants (2018); Miami Dolphins (2019); Chicago Bears (2020); Miami Dolphins (2021–2022); Las Vegas Raiders (2023–2024); Baltimore Ravens (2025–present)
Tom Compton	Offensive tackle	7	2013–2022	Washington Redskins (2012–2015); Atlanta Falcons (2016); Chicago Bears (2017); Minnesota Vikings (2018); New York Jets (2019); San Francisco 49ers (2020–2021); Denver Broncos (2022)
Jamar Taylor	Cornerback	7	2013–2020	Miami Dolphins (2013–2015); Cleveland Browns (2016–2017); Arizona Cardinals (2018); Denver Broncos (2018); Seattle Seahawks (2019); Atlanta Falcons (2019); San Francisco 49ers (2020)
Jadeveon Clowney^	Defensive end	7	2014–present	Houston Texans (2014–2018); Seattle Seahawks (2019); Tennessee Titans (2020); Cleveland Browns (2021–2022); Baltimore Ravens (2023); Carolina Panthers (2024); Dallas Cowboys (2025); Houston Texans (2026––present)
Brandin Cooks^	Wide receiver	7	2014–present	New Orleans Saints (2014–2016); New England Patriots (2017); Los Angeles Rams (2018–2019); Houston Texans (2020–2022); Dallas Cowboys (2023–2024); New Orleans Saints (2025); Buffalo Bills (2025); San Francisco 49ers (2026–present)
Teddy Bridgewater	Quarterback	7	2014–2025	Minnesota Vikings (2014–2017); New Orleans Saints (2018–2019); Carolina Panthers (2020); Denver Broncos (2021); Miami Dolphins (2022); Detroit Lions (2023–2024); Tampa Bay Buccaneers (2025)
Oday Aboushi	Offensive guard	7	2014–2022	New York Jets (2013–2015); Houston Texans (2015–2016); Seattle Seahawks (2017); Arizona Cardinals (2018); Detroit Lions (2019–2020); Los Angeles Chargers (2021); Los Angeles Rams (2022)
Za'Darius Smith^	Defensive end	7	2015–present	Baltimore Ravens (2015–2018); Green Bay Packers (2019–2021); Minnesota Vikings (2022); Cleveland Browns (2023–2024); Detroit Lions (2024); Philadelphia Eagles (2025); Atlanta Falcons (2026–present)
Michael Burton^	Fullback	7	2015–present	Detroit Lions (2015–2016); Chicago Bears (2017–2018); Washington Redskins (2019); New Orleans Saints (2020); Kansas City Chiefs (2021–2022); Denver Broncos (2023–2025); Cleveland Browns (2026–present)
Mario Edwards Jr.^	Defensive tackle	7	2015–2025	Oakland Raiders (2015–2017); New York Giants (2018); New Orleans Saints (2019); Chicago Bears (2020–2021); Tennessee Titans (2022); Seattle Seahawks (2023); Houston Texans (2024–2025)
Kwon Alexander	Linebacker	7	2015–2024	Tampa Bay Buccaneers (2015–2018); San Francisco 49ers (2019–2020); New Orleans Saints (2020–2021); New York Jets (2022); Pittsburgh Steelers (2023); Denver Broncos (2024); Detroit Lions (2024)
Carl Davis	Defensive tackle	7	2015–2024	Baltimore Ravens (2015–2017); Cleveland Browns (2018); Indianapolis Colts (2019); Jacksonville Jaguars (2019–2020); New England Patriots (2020–2022); Dallas Cowboys (2023); Washington Commanders (2024)
Jonathan Bullard^	Defensive end	7	2016–present	Chicago Bears (2016–2018); Arizona Cardinals (2019–2020); Seattle Seahawks (2020); Atlanta Falcons (2021); Minnesota Vikings (2022–2024); New Orleans Saints (2025); Dallas Cowboys (2026–present)
Eli Apple	Cornerback	7	2016–2025	New York Giants (2016–2018); New Orleans Saints (2018–2019); Carolina Panthers (2020); Cincinnati Bengals (2021–2022); Miami Dolphins (2023); Los Angeles Chargers (2024); San Francisco 49ers (2025)
Jihad Ward^	Linebacker	7	2016–2025	Oakland Raiders (2016–2017); Indianapolis Colts (2018–2019); Baltimore Ravens (2019–2020); Jacksonville Jaguars (2021); New York Giants (2022–2023); Minnesota Vikings (2024); Tennessee Titans (2025)
Yannick Ngakoue	Linebacker	7	2016–2024	Jacksonville Jaguars (2016–2019); Minnesota Vikings (2020); Baltimore Ravens (2020); Las Vegas Raiders (2021); Indianapolis Colts (2022); Chicago Bears (2023); Baltimore Ravens (2024); New England Patriots (2024)
Eric Tomlinson	Tight end	7	2016–2024	New York Jets (2016–2018); New York Giants (2019); New England Patriots (2019); Oakland Raiders (2019); New York Giants (2020); Baltimore Ravens (2020–2021); Denver Broncos (2022); Los Angeles Chargers (2024)
Daryl Worley	Safety	7	2016–2024	Carolina Panthers (2016–2017); Oakland Raiders (2018–2019); Dallas Cowboys (2020); Buffalo Bills (2020); Las Vegas Raiders (2020); Detroit Lions (2021); Baltimore Ravens (2021–2023); Tennessee Titans (2024)
Pharaoh Brown^	Tight end	7	2017–present	Oakland Raiders (2017); Cleveland Browns (2018–2019); Houston Texans (2020–2022); Cleveland Browns (2022); New England Patriots (2023); Seattle Seahawks (2024); Arizona Cardinals (2025); Indianapolis Colts (2026–present)
Marquez Valdes-Scantling^	Wide receiver	7	2018–present	Green Bay Packers (2018–2021); Kansas City Chiefs (2022–2023); Buffalo Bills (2024); New Orleans Saints (2024); San Francisco 49ers (2025); Pittsburgh Steelers (2025); Los Angeles Chargers (2026)
Isaac Yiadom^	Cornerback	7	2018–present	Denver Broncos (2018–2019); New York Giants (2020); Green Bay Packers (2021); Houston Texans (2022); New Orleans Saints (2022–2023); San Francisco 49ers (2024); New Orleans Saints (2025); Washington Commanders (2026–present)
Joshua Dobbs^	Quarterback	7	2018–present	Pittsburgh Steelers (2018, 2020); Tennessee Titans (2022); Arizona Cardinals (2023); Minnesota Vikings (2023); San Francisco 49ers (2024); New England Patriots (2025); Detroit Lions (2026–present)
Tre Flowers	Cornerback	7	2018–2025	Seattle Seahawks (2018–2021); Cincinnati Bengals (2021–2022); Atlanta Falcons (2023); Jacksonville Jaguars (2024); Indianapolis Colts (2024); Detroit Lions (2025); Pittsburgh Steelers (2025)
Chase McLaughlin^	Placekicker	7	2019–present	Los Angeles Chargers (2019); San Francisco 49ers (2019); Indianapolis Colts (2019); Jacksonville Jaguars (2020); New York Jets (2020); Cleveland Browns (2021); Indianapolis Colts (2022); Tampa Bay Buccaneers (2023–present)
Evan Brown^	Center	7	2019–present	New York Giants (2019); Miami Dolphins (2019); Cleveland Browns (2020); Detroit Lions (2020–2022); Seattle Seahawks (2023); Arizona Cardinals (2024–2025); Houston Texans (2026–present)

== See also ==
- Journeyman quarterback
- List of NFL players who spent their entire career with one franchise
