= Tom Dickinson (American football) =

American football player (1897–1999)

Profile
- Position: End

Personal information
- Born: July 20, 1897; Detroit, Michigan, U.S.
- Died: October 20, 1999 (aged 102); Georgetown, Ohio, U.S.
- Listed height: 5 ft 8 in (1.73 m)
- Listed weight: 175 lb (79 kg)

Career information
- High school: Northwestern (Detroit, Michigan)
- College: Syracuse

Career history
- Detroit Heralds (1920)
- Stats at Pro Football Reference

Thomas Passmore Dickinson (July 20, 1897 – October 29, 1999) was an American football player, United States Army officer, and lawyer. He played professionally for three games as an end for the Detroit Heralds of the American Professional Football Association (APFA) — now known as the National Football League (NFL) — during their 1920 season. He was an alumnus of Syracuse University and enlisted to fight World War I although he never made it overseas. He later served in World War II and the Korean War, retiring from the armed forces as a lieutenant colonel in 1955.

Dickinson was born Detroit, and graduated from the Detroit College of Law — now known as the Michigan State University College of Law. He admitted to practice law in 1928, focusing on real estate and corporate law. He died at the age of 102, on October 29, 1999, at the Meadow Wood Care Center in Georgetown, Ohio.
