= Joe Fitzgerald (American football) =

American football player (1899–1978)

Profile
- Position: End

Personal information
- Born: March 6, 1899; Detroit, Michigan, U.S.
- Died: March 1, 1978 (aged 78)
- Listed weight: 150 lb (68 kg)

Career history
- Detroit Heralds (1920)
- Stats at Pro Football Reference

Joseph Morris Fitzgerald (March 6, 1899 – March 1, 1978) was an American football player. He played at the end position for the 1920 Detroit Heralds during the first regular season of the NFL (then known as the American Professional Football Association). He was the first player in NFL history to return an interception for a touchdown, and he was the Heralds' leading scorer in 1920 with 12 points on two touchdowns.

== Early life ==
Fitzgerald was born in 1899 in Detroit, Michigan. His father was Andrew Fitzgerald, an immigrant from Canada. His mother, Anna, was also an immigrant from Canada. In 1910, Fitzgerald was living with his parents and five siblings at Charlevoix, Michigan, where his father was a laborer in a gravel pit.

Fitzgerald attended Detroit's Western High School, and in 1918 he was employed by the Checker National Biscuit Co. in Detroit.

== Professional career ==
In 1920, Fitzgerald played for the Detroit Heralds during the first regular season of the National Football League (then known as the American Professional Football Association). The Heralds opened their season with a game against the Cleveland Panthers, played at Navin Field on October 10, 1920. The Heralds won by a 40-14 score, and Fitzgerald, the Heralds' substitute left end, scored the team's fourth touchdown.

On October 24, 1920, Fitzgerald appeared in the Heralds' game against the Columbus Panhandles as the team's starting left end. Fitzgerald scored the only points of the game, as he intercepted a pass from Frank Nesser and returned it 85 yards for a touchdown. Fitzgerald's score against Columbus was the first interception return for a touchdown in NFL history.

With 12 points on two touchdowns, Fitzgerald was the leading scorer on the 1920 Heralds team.

== Later life ==
In his later years, Fitzgerald lived in Grand Rapids, Michigan. He died there in 1978 at age 78. He was buried at the Resurrection Cemetery in Wyoming, Michigan.
