= Hugh Lowery =

American football player (1892–1972)

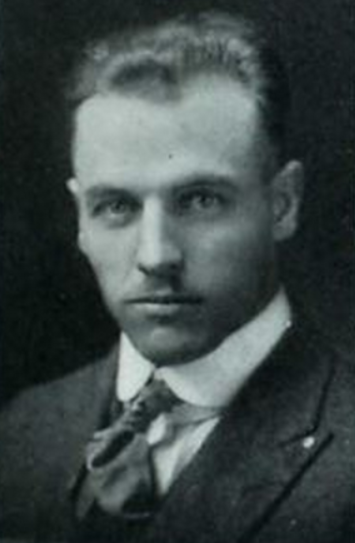

Profile
- Position: Tackle

Personal information
- Born: July 19, 1892; Cutler, Indiana, US
- Died: September 5, 1972 (aged 80); Bradenton, Florida, US
- Listed weight: 220 lb (100 kg)

Career information
- College: Franklin College

Career history
- Detroit Heralds (1920)
- Stats at Pro Football Reference

Hugh Lowery (July 19, 1892 – September 5, 1972) was an American football player. He played at the tackle position for the 1920 Detroit Heralds during the first regular season of the National Football League (NFL), then known as the American Professional Football Association (APFA). He was also a member of the football, basketball, baseball and track and field teams at Franklin College.

== Early life ==
Lowery was born in 1892 in Cutler, Indiana. He had a twin sister Ruie Lowery. In 1900, Lowery was living with his mother, Irene Lowery, grandmother, Rebecca Jervis, and three siblings in Democrat Township, Carroll County, Indiana. By 1910, Lowery was 17 and working as a farm laborer in Democrat Township. His mother was no longer part of the household, which was headed by his grandmother, Rebecca Jervis.

Lowery played basketball at Cutler High School and led that team to the county championship in two consecutive years.

== College athletics and military service ==
Lowery played college football for Franklin College in Indiana. He was also a member of the baseball, basketball and track teams at Franklin College. He was captain of the Franklin basketball team, playing at the center position, for the 1916–17 season and captain of the track team, competing in sprint and weight events, in 1916. As a basketball player, he was regarded in 1916 as "the best defensive pivotal man in Indiana." As a sprinter, he ran the 100-yard dash in 10-2/5 seconds and the 220-yard event in 23 seconds.

His collegiate athletic career was interrupted by military service during World War I, though he continued to play during his training in New York. During the fall of 1917, Lowery was captain of the undefeated Mineola Flying Squad football team from the Aviation Training Camp at Mineola, Long Island, New York. On December 8, 1917, while playing in a blizzard at St. Paul School in Garden City, New York, Lowery recovered a fumble in the end zone for a touchdown during Mineola's 13–0 victory over Fort Slocum. The Mineola team finished the season undefeated and won the championship of the New York Athletic Club's Metropolitan District Army and Navy Posts Football League.

He attained the rank of first lieutenant in the Aviation Corps and served as an instructor of cross country and formation flights at the Third Aviation Instruction Center at Issoudun, France. He served from April 1917 until February 1919 and was stationed in England and France. In March 1918, Lowery wrote to his coach at Franklin advising that he was flying and hoped to be "in the big game on the front" and to "give the Hun a fight, one at least, I hope more."

Lowery returned to Franklin College after the war and received his Bachelor of Science degree in June 1919. He continued to play for the football team in the fall of 1919 and also served as the team's captain.

== Professional football ==
In January 1920, Lowery was hired to teach and coach the basketball team for the Young America schools in Indiana. He made his mark later that year as a player in the first season of the National Football League (NFL).

In September 1920, the NFL (called the American Professional Football Association during the 1920 and 1921 seasons) was founded at a meeting in the Hupmobile auto showroom of the owner of the Canton Bulldogs. In the inaugural season of the NFL, Lowery played for the Detroit Heralds. While playing for the Heralds, the Detroit Free Press reported his weight to be 240 pounds, though Pro-Football-Reference.com lists his weight at 220 pounds. The Heralds opened their season with a game against the Cleveland Panthers, played at Navin Field on October 10, 1920. The Heralds won by a 40–14 score, and Lowery, the Heralds' starting left tackle, scored the team's third touchdown.

== Family and later years ==
Lowery was married on June 22, 1921, to Myrtle "May" Hardin in a ceremony at Edinburgh, Indiana. They intended at that time to make their home in Detroit. They had a son, Hugh Lowery, born in approximately 1922.

In 1930 and 1940, Lowery was living with his wife and son in Alton, Illinois, where he was employed as a chemist for Standard Oil Co. According to a profile in the Franklin College Hall of Fame, Lowery became the chief chemist for Standard Oil of Indiana.

By 1951, Lowery and his wife May had moved to Bradenton, Florida. He died there in 1972 at age 80.

Lowery was posthumously inducted into the Franklin College Hall of Fame in 1975.
