= Charlie Carman =

American football player (1895–1976)

Profile
- Position: Guard

Personal information
- Born: January 13, 1895; McNairy County, Tennessee
- Died: October 30, 1976 (aged 81); Saint Petersburg, Florida
- Listed height: 5 ft 10 in (1.78 m)
- Listed weight: 215 lb (98 kg)

Career information
- High school: Clinton (KY) Marvin University
- College: Vanderbilt University

Career history
- Detroit Heralds (1920); Detroit Tigers (1921)
- Stats at Pro Football Reference

William Charles "Charlie" "Chili" Carman (January 13, 1895 – October 30, 1976) was an American football player. He played college football for Vanderbilt University and professional football at the guard position for the 1920 Detroit Heralds and the 1921 Detroit Tigers.

== Early life ==
Carman was born in 1895 in rural McNairy County, Tennessee, near Bethel Springs. He was the second child born to George Jefferson Carman and Laura (Lockman) Carman, both natives of McNairy County, Tennessee.

== Football player ==
Carman played college football at Vanderbilt University. During World War I, he served in the U.S. Army. In May 1917, he was a student officer in the R.O.T.C., serving at Fort Sheridan, to the north of Chicago. He attained the rank of captain.

In September 1920, the National Football League (called the American Professional Football Association during the 1920 and 1921 seasons) was founded at a meeting in the Hupmobile auto showroom of the owner of the Canton Bulldogs. In the inaugural season of the NFL, Carman appeared in one game for the 1920 Detroit Heralds. The following year, he appeared in six games for the 1921 Detroit Tigers.

== Later life ==
After retiring from football, Carman remained in Detroit and became an officer with the Detroit Police Department. He was married in approximately 1928 to his wife, Margaret, and, in 1930, they were living in an apartment in Detroit's 17th precinct. In 1940, Carman and his wife were living at 131 West Chicago Boulevard in Detroit. He was employed as a real estate broker, and she was employed as a school teacher.

Carman died in 1976 in Saint Petersburg, Florida, at age 81. He was buried at the Norway Township Cemetery in Norway, Michigan.
