= Moegle =

Moegle is a surname. Notable people with the surname include:

- Dicky Moegle (1934–2021), American football player
- Eddie Moegle (1896–1983), American football player
- Fritz Moegle (1916–1986), Austrian art director
