= Lynn Allen =

American football player (1891–1958)

- Lynn Allen, 1932

Profile
- Position: Halfback

Personal information
- Born: February 27, 1891; Birmingham, Michigan, U.S.
- Died: May 31, 1958 (aged 67); Grayling, Michigan, U.S.
- Listed height: 6 ft 0 in (1.83 m)
- Listed weight: 170 lb (77 kg)

Career information
- High school: Central (Detroit)
- College: Detroit (1917)

Career history
- Detroit Heralds (1920)
- Stats at Pro Football Reference

Lynn D. Allen (February 27, 1891 – May 31, 1958) was an American football player and politician. He played college football for the University of Detroit and professional football for the Detroit Heralds. He also served as the Oakland County Clerk from 1932 until his death in 1958.

== Early life and college ==
Allen was born in 1891 in Birmingham, Michigan, on a farm near Telegraph and Maple Roads. He began high school in Birmingham but transferred to Detroit Central High School as a sophomore, becoming a football star there. He then enrolled at the University of Detroit where he played for the 1917 Detroit Tigers football team that compiled an 8–1 record. He was rated as "one of the greatest halfbacks in University of Detroit football history." He enlisted in the Navy in 1918 during World War I.

== Professional career ==
He also played professional football for the 1920 Detroit Heralds. He appeared in two games for the Heralds. He lost a hand in a hunting accident in 1921.

== Personal life ==
Allen was elected as a Republican as the Oakland County Clerk in 1932. He was then reelected 12 more times. He died of heart failure in Grayling, Michigan, over the Memorial Day weekend in 1958.
