= Ray Whipple =

American football player (1893–1973)

Profile
- Position: End

Personal information
- Born: November 14, 1893; Elgin, Illinois, US
- Died: December 1973 (aged 80); Joliet, Illinois, US
- Listed height: 5 ft 9 in (1.75 m)
- Listed weight: 170 lb (77 kg)

Career information
- High school: Elgin (IL)
- College: Notre Dame

Career history
- Detroit Heralds (1920)
- Stats at Pro Football Reference

Ray Christopher Whipple (November 14, 1893 - December 1973) was an American football player. He played at the end position in college football for the Notre Dame Fighting Irish and in professional football for the Detroit Heralds from 1917 to 1920. He played for the 1920 Detroit Heralds during the first regular season of the National Football League (then known as the American Professional Football Association). He was selected as an All-Pro player in 1917.

== Early life ==
Whipple was born in 1893 at Elgin, Illinois. His father, L. F. Whipple, was a Michigan native, and his mother, Jennie Whipple, was an immigrant from Ireland. His father was employed as a carpenter when Whipple was a boy.

== Football career ==
Whipple played college football for the Notre Dame Fighting Irish football team in Indiana. In December 1915, The Notre Dame Scholastic wrote: "The stocky little end played the style of game that the rooters like. Always ready for a hard struggle, he put forth his every effort. 'Whip' is a deadly tackler and a terror to the opposition. At the end position, he has been a most valuable adjunct to Harper's great machine . . ."

After graduating from Notre Dame, Whipple worked as a cooper at the Elgin Butter Tub Co. in Elgin, Illinois. That fall, he also played professional football for the Detroit Heralds, a team that played opponents in the Ohio State League before the formation of the National Football League. After the 1917 season, the Toledo News-Bee selected Whipple and Greasy Neale as the ends for its "All-Western Team of Professional Football Players".

In September 1920, the NFL (called the American Professional Football Association during the 1920 and 1921 seasons) was founded at a meeting in the Hupmobile auto showroom of the owner of the Canton Bulldogs. In the inaugural season of the NFL, Whipple played for the Detroit Heralds.

== Family and later years ==
After retiring from football, Whipple had a number of different occupations. In 1930, he was living in Elgin, Illinois with his wife, Genevieve, and was working as a golf pro at the Wing Park Golf Course. In 1940, Whipple was living in Elgin, Illinois, and working as an auditor's clerk for the Illinois State Auditor. In 1942, Whipple was employed by Sanderson-Porter in Joliet, Illinois. Whipple died in December 1973 in Joliet at age 80.
