= Ty Krentler =

American football player (1895–1971)

Profile
- Position: Fullback

Personal information
- Born: April 23, 1895; Detroit, Michigan
- Died: November 30, 1971 (aged 76); St. Clair Shores, Michigan
- Listed weight: 160 lb (73 kg)

Career information
- High school: Eastpointe (MI) East Detroit
- College: Detroit

Career history
- Detroit Heralds (1920); Detroit Maroons (1921)
- Stats at Pro Football Reference

Walter Lisle "Ty" Krentler (April 23, 1895 - November 30, 1971), sometimes shown as Walter Lyle Krentler, was an American football player. He played at the fullback position for the 1920 Detroit Heralds during the first regular season of the NFL (then known as the American Professional Football Association). He also played college football for the University of Detroit in 1918 and 1919 and professional football for the Detroit Maroons in 1921.

== Early life ==
Krentler was born in 1895 in Detroit, Michigan. He attended Detroit's Eastern High School (now Martin Luther King High School and first gained notoriety in 1913 when he scored two touchdowns in the first five minutes of a game against Bay City Eastern High School.

== Football player ==
After graduating from high school, Krentler enrolled at Washington & Jefferson College intending to play college football for the Washington & Jefferson Presidents, then one of the leading football programs in the country. He left Washington & Jefferson due to "poor scholarship" and later enrolled at the University of Detroit. He played for the Detroit Titans football team in 1918 and 1919. After a game against the University of Michigan, the Detroit Free Press wrote that Krentler "showed the greatest exhibition of line plunging seen in a long while on Goldberg field." He also worked in 1918 as an accident investigator for the Detroit United Railway.

In 1920, Krentler played for the Detroit Heralds during the first regular season of the National Football League (then known as the American Professional Football Association). The Heralds finished the 1920 season with a game against the Detroit Maroons for the city championship. Krentler scored the Heralds' only touchdown in the final minute of the third quarter. The Maroons tied the game with a touchdown in the fourth quarter by fullback Schultz.

In 1921, Krentler played for the Detroit Maroons, a professional football team based in Detroit.

== Family and later years ==
Krentler was married to Alice McClenmont in 1921. They had two sons, Walter (born c. 1923) and Robert (born c. 1924). In 1930, Krentler was living with his family in Detroit and was employed as a salesman of automobile tires. Krentler and his wife divorced in 1938.

In 1940, Krentler lived in Detroit and was employed as a state sales tax auditor. In 1942, he lived in Warren, Ohio, where he worked for the U.S. Navy at the Cleveland Diesel Motor Co. Krentler lived in his later years at St. Clair Shores, Michigan. He died there in 1971 at age 76.
