= Earl Dunn =

American football player

No. 10
- Position: Fullback

Personal information
- Born: December 13, 1890; Washington, Pennsylvania, U.S.
- Died: September 20, 1949 (aged 58); Detroit, Michigan, U.S.
- Listed height: 5 ft 11 in (1.80 m)
- Listed weight: 176 lb (80 kg)

Career information
- High school: Washington (Pennsylvania)
- College: None

Career history
- Detroit Heralds (1909–1920); Detroit Tigers (1921)
- Stats at Pro Football Reference

Earl Guy Dunn (December 13, 1890 – September 20, 1949), sometimes referred to as Pat Dunne, was an American professional football fullback who played two seasons in the American Professional Football Association (APFA) with the Detroit Heralds and Detroit Tigers.

== Early life ==
Earl Guy Dunn was born on December 13, 1890, in Washington, Pennsylvania. He played high school football at Washington High School. He did not play college football.

== Professional career ==
Dunn played for the Detroit Heralds from 1909 to 1920. He was mostly a fullback during his football career but also spent time at halfback and linebacker. He started all nine games for the Heralds in 1915 as the team finished with a 7–1–1 record. Dunn played in all 11 games, starting ten, the following year in 1916 and the Heralds went 6–5. He appeared in nine games, all starts, during the 1917 season as Detroit went 8–2. He was also a member of the Heralds in 1918 but it is not known how many games he played in. Dunn played in three games, starting one, in 1919. In 1920, the Heralds were founding members of the American Professional Football Association (later known as the National Football League). Dunn played in three games, starting two, as a fullback/linebacker during the APFA's first season.

The Heralds were reorganized into the Detroit Tigers, after the city's Major League Baseball team, for the 1921 season. Dunn appeared in two games for the Tigers in 1921. Several players complained about not getting paid and left the team during the season. As a result, the Tigers officially folded in mid-November 1921.

== Personal life ==
In 1932, the Detroit Tigers major league baseball team signed minor leaguer Sammy Griest at the recommendation of Dunn. Griest and Dunn were both from Washington, Pennsylvania. In 1939, Dunn organized a reunion of former Heralds and Tigers football players. He died on September 20, 1949, in Detroit. The Detroit Free Press called Dunn "one of the pioneers of professional football in Detroit." His funeral was held on September 22, 1949.
