= Steamer Horning =

American football player (1892–1982)

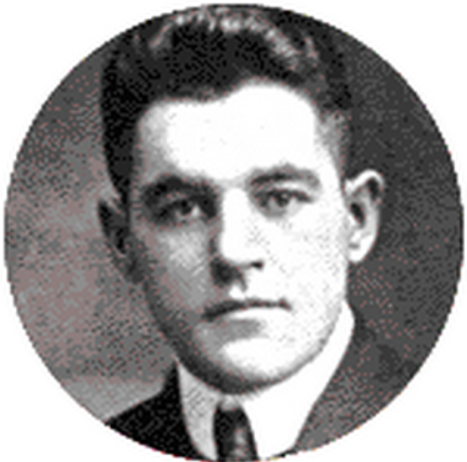

Profile
- Position: Tackle

Personal information
- Born: November 15, 1892; Phoenix, New York, U.S.
- Died: January 24, 1982 (aged 89)

Career information
- College: Colgate

Career history
- Detroit Heralds (1920); Detroit Tigers (1921); Buffalo All-Americans (1921); Toledo Maroons (1922–1923)

Awards and highlights
- First-team All-Pro (1922); Consensus All-American (1916); Colgate University Athletics Hall of Honor

Career statistics
- Games played: 36
- Games started: 30
- Touchdowns: 2
- Stats at Pro Football Reference

Clarence Edward "Steamer" Horning (November 15, 1892 January 24, 1982) was an American football player in the 1910s and 1920s. He played college football for at Colgate University, and was selected in 1916 as a first-team All-American at the tackle position. He also played professional football in the Ohio State League in 1917 and 1919 and in the National Football League (NFL) from 1920 to 1923. He was selected as a first-team All-NFL player in both 1922 and 1923.

== Early life ==
Horning was born in 1892 in Phoenix, New York. His parents, Wilburt (or William) and Amelia Horning, were both New York natives. In 1900, the family lived in Phoenix, and Horning's father was described as a "paper machine tender". By 1910, the family had moved to Wheatland, New York, where Horning's father worked as a fireman in another paper mill.

== Athletic career ==
=== Colgate University ===
Horning played college football at Colgate University from 1913 to 1916. In December 1915, he was selected as the captain of the 1916 Colgate team. After the 1916 season, Walter Camp, writing in Collier's Weekly, selected Horning as a first-team All-American at the tackle position.

=== Pittsburgh Pirates ===
In early 1917, Horning was signed by Barney Dreyfuss of the Pittsburgh Pirates to play professional baseball, In a draft registration card completed in June 1917, Horning described himself as a baseball player under contract to play for the Pittsburgh National League baseball club. However, it appears from the records of Baseball-Reference.com that he never played at the professional level.

=== Professional football and military ===
In the fall of 1917, Horning began his professional football career playing for the Detroit Heralds, a team that competed against teams in Michigan and in the Ohio League. However, his first stint in professional football was interrupted by military service during World War I. Horning was inducted into the military at Fort Niagara, New York, at the end of November 1917.

In 1919, Horning was hired as the assistant coach responsible for the linemen on the University of Detroit football team. He also played for the Detroit Heralds during the 1919 season.

In September 1920, the NFL (called the American Professional Football Association during the 1920 and 1921 seasons) was founded at a meeting in the Hupmobile auto showroom of the owner of the Canton Bulldogs. In the inaugural season of the NFL, Horning played for the 1920 Detroit Heralds. The Heralds opened the 1920 season with a game against the Cleveland Panthers, played at Navin Field on October 10, 1920. The Heralds won by a 40–14 score, and Horning, playing at the right tackle position, also handled kicking for the club and converted on four goals after touchdown for Detroit. Horning's four conversions were the first special team points scored by a Detroit NFL team.

Horning played a total of four seasons in the NFL. After the 1920 season, he played for the Detroit Tigers (1921). When the Tigers folded, Horning was among the players loaned to the Buffalo All-Americans to finish out their season; he scored the All-Americans' only touchdown on a blocked punt return in the de facto championship game that year, falling on the ball in the end zone after the block. The touchdown was one of two Horning, a lineman, scored during his NFL career. Horning spent the 1922 and 1923 seasons with the Toledo Maroons, where he was selected as a first-team All-NFL player by the Canton Daily News in both seasons.

== Later life ==
In 1921, Horning became the coach for the University of Detroit High School football team.

In 1940, Horning was living with his wife, Georgianna, and daughter, Betty Jane, in Royal Oak, Michigan, and was employed as a school teacher. Two years later, he was employed at the high school located at the corner of Glendale and 2nd in Highland Park, Michigan.

In his later years, Horning lived in Beverly Hills, Michigan, a suburb of Detroit. He died there in 1982 at age 89.
