= Percy Wilson (American football) =

American football player (1890–1936)

Profile
- Positions: Quarterback, halfback

Personal information
- Born: February 22, 1890; Lifford, Ontario, Canada
- Died: September 20, 1936 (aged 46); Detroit, Michigan, U.S.
- Listed height: 5 ft 7 in (1.70 m)
- Listed weight: 150 lb (68 kg)

Career information
- High school: Western (Detroit)

Career history
- Detroit Heralds (1913–1920)
- Stats at Pro Football Reference

Percival James Wilson (February 22, 1890 – September 20, 1936), sometimes shown as Perce Wilson, was an American football player. He was the quarterback for the 1920 Detroit Heralds during the first regular season of the National Football League (NFL). He was one of the first Canadian-born players and the first Canadian-born quarterback, to play in the NFL.

== Early life ==
Wilson was born in 1890 in Lifford, Ontario, Canada. His father, James Wilson, was born in Canada to Irish immigrants. His mother, Anna, was also born in Canada.

Wilson moved to Detroit as a young boy and attended Detroit's Western High School. By 1917, Wilson had become a naturalized United States citizen and was employed in the milk and creamery business in Detroit.

== Professional athlete ==
Prior to the formation of the National Football League, Wilson was a star for the Detroit Heralds dating back to at least 1910. In 1915, the Detroit Free Press wrote that Wilson, who had been playing for Detroit and other teams for eight years, "passed splendidly, blocked and tackled with deadliness" despite being half the size of the opposing players.

Wilson was rated as "one of the best all-around athletes in Detroit" who also played basketball as a guard for the Detroit Rayls and baseball as a second baseman in the Illinois–Indiana–Iowa League.

In 1920, he played for the Detroit Heralds during the first regular season of the National Football League (then known as the American Professional Football Association). The Heralds opened their season with a game against the Cleveland Panthers, played at Navin Field on October 10, 1920. The Heralds won by a 40–14 score, and Wilson, the Heralds' starting quarterback, scored the team's fifth touchdown. Two weeks later, Wilson appeared in the Heralds' game against the Columbus Panhandles as a substitute at the quarterback position. On November 28, 1920, he played at the left halfback position for the Heralds.

Wilson was one of the first Canadian-born players, and the first Canadian-born quarterback, to play in the NFL. The other three Canadian-born players to play in the NFL during its inaugural 1920 season were Buck MacDonald, a guard, Tommy Hughitt, a halfback, and Jim Bryant, a halfback.

== Later life ==
Wilson and his brother, Ernie Wilson, also played basketball for the Detroit Rayls, a team that existed in the late 1910s and early 1920s.

Wilson died in 1936 in Detroit at age 46.
