= Eddie Moegle =

American football player (1896–1983)

Profile
- Position: Halfback

Personal information
- Born: July 11, 1896; Ann Arbor, Michigan, U.S.
- Died: June 4, 1983 (aged 86); Bruce, Michigan, U.S.
- Listed height: 5 ft 9 in (1.75 m)
- Listed weight: 186 lb (84 kg)

Career information
- High school: Detroit (MI) Central
- College: Detroit

Career history
- Detroit Heralds (1920); Detroit Tigers (1921); Royal Oak Merchants (1922)

Career statistics
- Games played: 5
- Games started: 2
- Touchdowns: 2
- Stats at Pro Football Reference

Edgar Louis Moegle (July 11, 1896 – June 4, 1983) was an American football player. After serving in World War I, he played halfback for the University of Detroit in 1919 and for the Detroit Heralds and Detroit Tigers during the first and second regular seasons of the National Football League (NFL). He scored the first touchdown in the Heralds' first game of the first NFL season.

== Early life ==
Moegle was born in Ann Arbor, Michigan, in 1896. During World War I, he served two years in the U.S. Army, enlisting in April 1917 and serving until May 1919.

Moegle played college football at halfback position for the University of Detroit during the 1919 college football season. He scored the game-winning touchdown in Detroit's 16–13 victory over Georgetown on October 26, 1919.

== Professional football ==
In 1920, he played professional football for the Detroit Heralds during the first NFL regular season. The Heralds opened their season with a game against the Cleveland Panthers, played at Navin Field on October 10, 1920. The Heralds won by a 40–14 score, and Moegle, the Heralds' starting right halfback, scored the team's first touchdown.

Later in the 1920 season, Moegle became the head coach, and left halfback, of the Detroit Maroons, a competing professional football team in Detroit. On December 5, 1920, the Maroons and Heralds played for the city championship. With Moegle playing at the left halfback position, the teams played to a 7–7 tie.

During the 1921 NFL season, Moegle played for the Detroit Tigers.

== Family and later years ==
At the time of the 1920 U.S. Census in January 1920, Moegle was living in Detroit with his mother, Elizabeth, and was employed as a clerk in the post office.

After retiring from football, Moegle worked as a bank clerk and lived in Royal Oak, Michigan. In his later years, he lived in Armada, Michigan, though he died at Bruce, Michigan, in 1983. He was buried at the Romeo Cemetery in Romeo, Michigan.
