= Charlie Guy =

American football player (1896–1974)

No. 11
- Positions: Guard, center

Personal information
- Born: December 5, 1896; Schenectady, New York, U.S.
- Died: April 9, 1974 (aged 77); Tampa, Florida, U.S.
- Listed height: 6 ft 0 in (1.83 m)
- Listed weight: 170 lb (77 kg)

Career information
- High school: Pinkerton Academy (NH)
- College: Washington & Jefferson College; Dartmouth College

Career history
- Detroit Heralds (1920); Detroit Tigers (1921); Buffalo All-Americans (1921–1922); Cleveland Indians (1923); Dayton Triangles (1924)

Awards and highlights
- Canton Daily News: 1st team All-NFL (1923); GB Press-Gazette: 3rd team All-NFL (1923)
- Stats at Pro Football Reference

Charles Howgate Guy (December 5, 1896 – April 9, 1974) was an American football player. He played college football for Dartmouth College and Washington & Jefferson College and professional football in the National Football League (NFL) for five teams between 1920 and 1924. He was selected as an All-NFL player in 1923.

== Early life ==
Guy was born in 1896 at Schenectady, New York. He attended secondary school at the Pinkerton Academy in Derry, New Hampshire. His father was Charles S. Guy, an immigrant from England. His mother was Carrie Guy.

== College football and military service ==
Guy played college football at Dartmouth College and Washington & Jefferson College.

Prior to the United States entering World War I, Guy left Washington & Jefferson when he was accepted into the American Volunteer Motor Ambulance Corps. His February 1917 passport application to travel to France for that purpose was personally sponsored by Eliot Norton, a member of the family that organized the Ambulance Corps (aka the Norton-Harjes Ambulance Corps). He traveled to England on the SS Lapland, arriving in September 1917. After the United States entered the war, Guy served in the U.S. Army infantry from September 1918 to December 1919. He attained the rank of second lieutenant.

== Professional football ==
In September 1920, the National Football League (called the American Professional Football Association during the 1920 and 1921 seasons) was founded at a meeting in the Hupmobile auto showroom of the owner of the Canton Bulldogs. In the inaugural season of the NFL, Guy played at the guard position for the 1920 Detroit Heralds. The Heralds opened the 1920 season with a game against the Cleveland Panthers, played at Navin Field on October 10, 1920. The Heralds won by a 40-14 score. After "a mix-up" with Guy and teammate Gil Runkel, Cleveland's star halfback Arnold Vogel was carried off the field in the fourth quarter with a broken left shoulder and three broken ribs; he was taken to Detroit Receiving Hospital for medical treatment. The Detroit Free Press called it "a rough and tumble match."

Guy played professional football in the NFL for five seasons. Following the 1920 season, he played for the Detroit Tigers (1921), Buffalo All-Americans (1921-1922), Cleveland Indians (1923), and Dayton Triangles (1924). In 1923, he was selected as a first-team All-NFL player by the Canton Daily News and a third-team All-NFL player by the Green Bay Press-Gazette.

== Family and later years ==
After retiring from football, Guy was married to Garnette Guy. They had five sons, Charles, John, David, Richard and Michael. Guy became involved in the electrical appliance business and moved his family to locations in Massachusetts and Ohio. In 1930, Guy was living in Belmont, Massachusetts, with his wife, Garnette, and their two oldest sons, Charles and John. He was employed at that time as a manager for a vacuum cleaner company. By 1935, Guy had moved to Mansfield, Ohio. In 1940, Guy was living in Mansfield with his wife, Garnette, and their five sons. He was employed at that time as a manager with an electric appliance company. In 1942, Guy was still living in Mansfield with his wife, Garnette, and he was employed there with the Westinghouse E & M Co.

His son, Charlie Guy, Jr., graduated from the United States Naval Academy in 1946. He played on the Navy lacrosse team and received the Schmeisser Award as the nation's best defenseman.

Guy died in 1974 at Tampa, Florida at age 77.
