= Ernest Watson =

American football player and coach (1895–1995)

Biographical details
- Born: December 13, 1895; Pontiac, Michigan, U.S.
- Died: March 10, 1995 (aged 99); Newberry, Michigan, U.S.

Playing career
- 1916–1919: Olivet
- 1920: Detroit Heralds
- Position: Blocking back

Coaching career (HC unless noted)
- 1920–1921: Olivet

Head coaching record
- Overall: 3–10–1

Ernest J. Watson (December 13, 1895 – March 10, 1995) was an American football player and coach.

== Head coaching record ==
Year	Team	Overall	Conference	Standing	Bowl/playoffs
Olivet Crimson (Michigan Intercollegiate Athletic Association) (1920–1921)
1920	Olivet	1–5	1–2	T–4th	
1921	Olivet	2–5–1	1–3	5th	
Olivet:		3–10–1	2–5		
Total:		3–10–1			
