= Jimmy Kelly (American football) =

American football running back (1892–1964)

Profile
- Position: Halfback

Personal information
- Born: November 9, 1892; Punxsutawney, Pennsylvania, U.S.
- Died: August 19, 1964 (aged 71); Detroit, Michigan, U.S.
- Listed height: 5 ft 9 in (1.75 m)
- Listed weight: 160 lb (73 kg)

Career information
- College: Detroit

Career history
- Detroit Heralds (1918–1920)
- Stats at Pro Football Reference

James Patrick Kelly (November 9, 1892 – August 19, 1964) was an American professional football halfback who played one season in the American Professional Football Association (APFA) with the Detroit Heralds. He played college football at the University of Detroit.

== Early life and college ==
James Patrick Kelly was born on November 9, 1892, in Punxsutawney, Pennsylvania. He played college football for the Detroit Titans of the University of Detroit, with his final year being in 1917.

== Professional career ==
After his college career, Kelly was a member of the Detroit Heralds in 1918 and was listed as a halfback. He played in six games, starting four, for the Heralds in 1919. He was listed as a halfback/fullback that year. The Heralds joined the American Professional Football Association for the league's first season in 1920. Kelly played in six games, starting three, for the Heralds that year as a tailback/defensive halfback.

== Personal life ==
Kelly spent time as a youth sports coach after his playing career. He opened Jimmy Kelly's Cafe in Detroit in 1932. He died on August 19, 1964, at Harper Hospital in Detroit.
