= 1921 NFL Championship controversy =

American football dispute

1921 de facto championship
Buffalo All-Americans (9–0–2)	Chicago Staleys (7–1)
7	10
Head coach: Tommy Hughitt	Head coach: George Halas
	1	2	3	4	Total
BUF	0	0	7	0	7
CHI	7	0	3	0	10
- Date: December 4, 1921
- Stadium: Cubs Park; Chicago, Illinois
- Attendance: 12,000

The 1921 NFL Championship controversy, known among Buffalo sports historians and fans as the Staley Swindle, is a dispute in which the Buffalo All-Americans unintentionally surrendered the 1921 APFA Championship title to the Chicago Staleys (later renamed the Chicago Bears). The controversy began at the conclusion of the 1921 season, when the All-Americans finished the season with the best record in the American Professional Football Association (renamed the National Football League in 1922). However, after losing what the All-Americans owner had intended to be an exhibition game to the Staleys on December 4, 1921, the All-Americans lost their title to Chicago on a tiebreaker.

== Background ==
The Buffalo All-Americans finished 1921 with a 9–0–2 record; meanwhile, Chicago captured second place with its only loss coming against Buffalo on Thanksgiving. The Staleys refused to play any road games that season except for their Thanksgiving game against the then-undefeated All-Americans, who also had played all of their games at home. Chicago owner George Halas then challenged the All-Americans to a rematch. Buffalo owner, Frank McNeil, having already scheduled the team's last game for December 3 against the Akron Pros, agreed on the condition that it be considered only a "post-season exhibition match" and not be counted in the standings. McNeil made a point of telling the Buffalo media that the two games were exhibitions and would have no bearing on the team's claim to the APFA title. He also released the players Buffalo had borrowed from the then-defunct Detroit Tigers NFL team to play one last exhibition game under the Tigers banner (the same day as the Staleys/All-Americans matchup, the Tigers played the Detroit Maroons; McNeil made one exception and kept lineman Clarence "Steamer" Horning, who would incidentally score the All-Americans' only points in the Staleys rematch by recovering a blocked punt for a touchdown). McNeil then scheduled the game against the Staleys for one day after the team's final game against Akron. Therefore, after a game against the tough Akron Pros on December 3, McNeil's team would take an all-night train to Chicago to play the Staleys the next day.

The All-Americans defeated the Pros, 14–0, then the team boarded a train for Chicago. Several of their players instead left to play in the Detroit Tigers game. Despite the defections and being worn out from the previous game, the All-Americans held their own against the Staleys, with the game tied in the third quarter; a field goal from Dutch Sternaman broke the tie and won the game for Chicago, 10–7. McNeil continued to assert that his team was the AFPA's 1921 champion, and even invested in tiny gold footballs for his players to commemorate the achievement. Even with the loss, Buffalo was still 9–1–2, while Chicago was 8–1, 0.5 games behind Buffalo in the standings (Buffalo played more games earlier in the season). If the season had ended that day, Buffalo would still have won the league title. Chicago, however, saw their opportunity, and swiftly scheduled two more games in December: one against the Canton Bulldogs, and the other against their crosstown rivals, the Chicago Cardinals. Winning both would have propelled Chicago to 10–1, one win ahead of Buffalo, and secure the championship. The Staleys defeated Canton, 10–0, on December 11, but managed only to reach a scoreless tie with the Cardinals on December 18. Thus, the two teams finished with identical records of 9–1 (ties did not count in the APFA standings at the time).

Halas decided to declare that the title belonged to Chicago and began to persuade the other owners in the league to give his Staleys the title. Halas based his claim for the championship on his belief that the second game of the Buffalo-Chicago series mattered more than the first. He also pointed out that the aggregate score of the two games was 16–14 in favor of the Staleys. McNeil insisted that Buffalo was the champion and maintained that the last two games his team played were merely exhibitions, to which Halas rebutted that there were no such things as exhibitions, since no set end of the season existed, and thus, according to him, all games had to be counted, whether Buffalo intended them to or not. (Both the All-Americans and the Staleys had disputed the previous year's title, but were both overruled and the Brunswick-Balke Collender Cup went to the Akron Pros.)

The league then instituted the first tiebreaker for the championship. The new rule stated that a rematch counted more than a first matchup, which handed the championship to Chicago. In their decision, based on a generally accepted (but now obsolete) rule that if two teams play each other more than once in a season, the second game counts more than the first, the executive committee followed established tradition. Had Buffalo not played the last game (or if it had not been counted per Buffalo's wishes), they would have had an undefeated season and won the title. This tiebreaker was discontinued by the NFL in 1933.

The winner of the game was supposed to have received possession of the Brunswick-Balke Collender Cup, the championship trophy established as a rotating prize the previous season. However it never arrived, so the Staleys did not receive the trophy, which is now thought to have been lost.

Throughout the rest of his life, McNeil made numerous attempts to get the league's decision overturned. Buffalo never again reached the level of success they did in the 1918-1921 period; the franchise barely stayed over .500 winning percentage for the next three seasons, after which the team fell to the bottom of the league in the standings for most of the rest of the decade, suspending operations in 1927 and folding in 1929.

The Professional Football Researchers Association has recognized both sides of the debate. Jeffrey J. Miller, who coined the phrase "Staley Swindle" to describe the controversy, has argued most fervently that the All-Americans were wronged by the league's decision, which stands to the present day. Kenneth Crippen, in contrast, has noted that Buffalo's competition was not as stiff and that, overall, the Staleys had a better season when factoring in margins of victory and strength of schedule. Ultimately the legitimacy of Buffalo's claim to the title rests on whether the game in question was on or off the record.

== Game box score ==
=== Box score ===
Quarter	1	2	3	4	Total
All-Americans	0	0	7	0	7
Staleys	7	0	3	0	10

at Cubs Park, Chicago, Illinois

- Date: December 4, 1921

Game information
- CHI – TD: Guy Chamberlin 75 yard interception return (Dutch Sternaman kick) 7–0 CHI
- BUF – TD: Steamer Horning blocked punt recovery in end zone (Elmer Oliphant kick) 7–7
- CHI – FG: Dutch Sternaman 20 yard field goal 10–7 CHI

== Long-term impact ==
The league was also forced to place a finite end to the season to prevent a repeat of this incident: in 1924, Chicago attempted to do the same thing with a post-season match against the Cleveland Bulldogs, but the league disallowed it, meaning the Bulldogs kept their title, and banned the use of postseason championship games.

In 1932, Chicago (now known as the Bears) and the Portsmouth Spartans finished tied for first in the standings, while the tiebreaker was not applicable since both their games had ended in ties. This situation forced the league to rescind the rule and schedule a playoff game to decide the championship.

The NFL Championship Game would become permanent in 1933 when the NFL was divided into Eastern and Western divisions with a standardized schedule: the "greater weight to a later game" tiebreaker was also formally abolished.
