= Moose Gardner =

American football player (1894–1954)

No. n/a
- Position: Guard

Personal information
- Born: July 2, 1894; Ashland, Wisconsin
- Died: December 23, 1954 (aged 60); Rocky River, Ohio

Career information
- College: Wisconsin

Career history
- Detroit Heralds/Tigers (1920–1921); Buffalo All-Americans (1921); Green Bay Packers (1922–1926)

Career NFL statistics
- Games played: 65
- Games started: 57
- Touchdowns: 1
- Stats at Pro Football Reference

Milton LeRoy "Moose" Gardner (July 2, 1894 – December 23, 1954) was a professional American football guard in the National Football League. He played for the Detroit Heralds/Tigers (1920–1921), the Buffalo All-Americans (1921), and the Green Bay Packers (1920–1926). He played at the collegiate level at the University of Wisconsin–Madison.
