= Birtie Maher =

American football player (1892–1980)

Profile
- Position: End

Personal information
- Born: December 16, 1892; Detroit, Michigan, U.S.
- Died: December 3, 1980 (aged 87); Royal Oak, Michigan, U.S.
- Listed height: 5 ft 8 in (1.73 m)
- Listed weight: 180 lb (82 kg)

Career information
- College: Detroit

Career history
- Detroit Heralds (1911–1920)

Career statistics
- Games played: 2
- Games started: 1
- Stats at Pro Football Reference

Gilbert Thomas "Birtie" Maher (December 16, 1892 – December 3, 1980) was an American football player.

Maher was born in 1892 to Irish immigrant parents in the Corktown neighborhood of Detroit. He played college football for the University of Detroit as its star halfback in 1913, and for the Detroit Heralds starting in 1911. When the Heralds joined the new National Football League (NFL) in 1920, Maher was a member of Detroit's first NFL team.
