= Bill Marshall (American football) =

American football coach and owner (1887–1926)

Personal information
- Born: October 24, 1887; Detroit, Michigan, U.S.
- Died: November 24, 1926 (aged 39); Detroit, Michigan, U.S.

Career information
- College: Detroit

Career history

Coaching
- 1905–1920: Detroit Heralds
- 1921: Detroit Tigers

owner/manager
- 1905–1920: Detroit Heralds
- 1921: Detroit Tigers
- Coaching profile at Pro Football Reference

William H. Marshall (October 24, 1887 – November 24, 1926) was the founder and long-time head coach of the Detroit Heralds (renamed the Detroit Tigers in 1921) of the early National Football League.

Marshall, as a student at the University of Detroit, founded the Heralds in 1905, as an amateur team, after the university didn't field a team that year due to financial issues. While the university's football team resumed play in 1906, the Heralds continued to play as an amateur team.

In 1911, the team dropped its amateur status and became semi-professional and left the campus. The team would go on to regularly play teams from the "Ohio League", namely the Canton Bulldogs and Massillon Tigers.

In 1920, the American Professional Football Association (later renamed the National Football League in 1922) was established. While the Heralds didn't officially join the association, they are listed in league standings for the season. The Heralds, under Marshall, had a 1–3 record, while inclement weather eliminated their November schedule, financially devastating the team.

In 1921, the Heralds were reorganized into the Detroit Tigers. Marshall remained the team's head coach, however financial issues caused that team to fold by year's end.
