= Detroit (1920s NFL teams) =

Former teams of the National Football League

Detroit (1920s NFL teams era)

General information
- Founded: 1905 (Heralds/Tigers); 1925 (Panthers); 1928 (Wolverines)
- Folded: 1921 (Heralds/Tigers); 1926 (Panthers); 1928 (Wolverines)
- Stadium: Navin Field (Heralds, Tigers, Panthers); Dinan Field (Wolverines)
- Headquartered: Detroit, Michigan, U.S.
- Colors: Red, white (Heralds) Orange, black, white (Tigers) Blue, gold, white (Panthers) Blue, white (Wolverines)

Team history
- Detroit Heralds (1905–1920); Detroit Tigers (1921); Detroit Panthers (1925–1926); Detroit Wolverines (1928)

League / conference affiliations
- Ohio League (1911–1919); American Professional Football Association (1920–1921); National Football League (1925–1926, 1928)

Detroit had four early teams in the National Football League before the Detroit Lions. The Heralds played in 1920, and had played as an independent as far back as 1905. The Tigers, a continuation of the Heralds, played in 1921, folding midseason and sending their players to the Buffalo All-Americans. The Panthers competed from 1925 to 1926 and the Wolverines in 1928.

== Team histories ==
=== Detroit Heralds/Tigers ===
In 1905, several University of Detroit football players, led by Bill Marshall, organized the Heralds as an amateur team after the university did not field a squad. While the university's football team resumed play in 1906, the Heralds continued to play as an amateur team. In 1911, the team dropped its amateur status and became semi-professional. In 1916, several out-of-town players were brought in to replace some of the older players, several of whom had been with the Heralds since 1905.

Despite not being based in Ohio, the Heralds played many of their games against teams in the Ohio League. In 1917, the team recorded an 8–2 record, their only losses coming at the hands of the Ohio League champion Canton Bulldogs and a military team from Battle Creek. The Heralds were a rarity in 1918; while most teams either stopped play or reduced their schedules to only local teams because of World War I and the flu pandemic, the Heralds continued to play a full schedule and even travel to other cities, accruing a 6–2 record with both losses coming to the Ohio League champion Dayton Triangles. In 1919, as the suspended teams resumed play and travel restrictions eased significantly, the Heralds went 1–4–2, including losses to the Bulldogs and the Massillon Tigers.

In 1920, the American Professional Football Association, predecessor to the National Football League, was established. While the Heralds did not officially join the association, they are listed in league standings for the season. Overall, the Heralds went 2–3–3.

The Heralds were reorganized into the Detroit Tigers, after the city's Major League Baseball team, for the 1921 season. However, after a tie and a win in their first two games, the Tigers lost the next five. Several players complained about not getting paid and left the team during the season. As a result, the Tigers officially folded in mid-November. Its remaining players were given to the Buffalo All-Americans.

=== Detroit Panthers ===
In 1925, Detroit fielded its second NFL franchise, the Detroit Panthers. The team was organized by future Hall of Famer, Jimmy Conzelman. Conzelman was a quarterback who had recently played with the Decatur Staleys, Rock Island Independents and the Milwaukee Badgers. Conzelman served as the team's owner, coach, and starting quarterback. The Panthers started the season 8–1. However, a 6–3 upset loss to the Independents on Thanksgiving Day knocked them out of first place and they ended the season in third with a 8–2–2 record.

The Panthers hoped to build on their 1925 season, but they opened the 1926 season with an 0–3 record. After rallying to a 4–0–2 record in their next six games, they lost their last three. Conzelman gave up the franchise and joined the Providence Steam Rollers as player-coach.

=== Detroit Wolverines ===
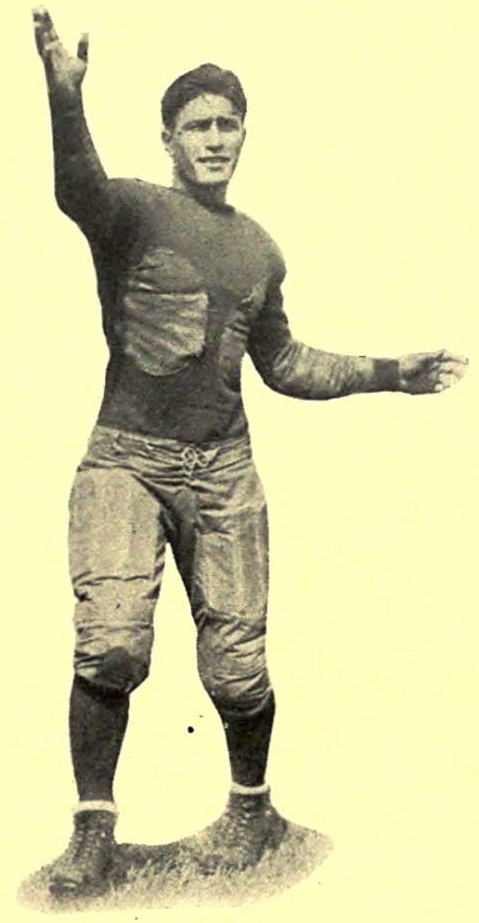
Benny Friedman

Following the 1927 season, the Cleveland Bulldogs were sold to a group of investors, who moved the team to Detroit. Coached by LeRoy Andrews, the team was renamed the Detroit Wolverines. They were named after quarterback Benny Friedman's alma mater, the Michigan Wolverines. The Wolverines finished their 1928 season in third place with a 7–2–1 record, losing only to the Providence Steam Rollers and the Frankford Yellow Jackets, the NFL's first and second place teams.

During the offseason, Tim Mara, the owner of the New York Giants, was interested in acquiring Friedman. Rather than simply trade for Friedman, Mara bought the entire Wolverines franchise and promptly deactivated it, delivering Friedman and other star Wolverines players to New York. The NFL would not return to the Motor City for six years, until the Portsmouth Spartans became the Detroit Lions in 1934.

== Thanksgiving Day games ==
While the Lions are well known for playing on Thanksgiving Day, the other Detroit teams had a history of playing on Thanksgiving Day as well:

- 1917 Heralds vs. Canton Bulldogs (lost 7–0)
- 1920 Heralds at Dayton Triangles (lost 28–0)
- 1921 Tigers, merged with the Buffalo All-Americans, at Chicago Staleys (won 7–6)
- 1925 Panthers vs. Rock Island Independents (lost 6–3)
- 1926 Panthers vs. Los Angeles Buccaneers (lost 9–6)
- 1928 Wolverines vs. Dayton Triangles (won 33–0)

== Pro Football Hall of Famers ==
Detroit Heralds / Tigers / Panthers / Wolverines Hall of Famers
Players
No.	Name	Position	Tenure	Inducted
—	Jimmy Conzelman	HB/QB; Coach	1925–1926	1964
—	Benny Friedman	QB	1928	2005

== Season-by-season ==
	Year	W	L	T	Finish	Coach
Heralds	1920	2	3	3	9th	Bill Marshall
Tigers	1921	1	5	1	16th	Bill Marshall
Panthers	1925	8	2	2	3rd	Jimmy Conzelman
Panthers	1926	4	6	2	12th	Jimmy Conzelman
Wolverines	1928	7	2	1	3rd	LeRoy Andrews
