= Daddy Potts =

American football player (1898–1981)

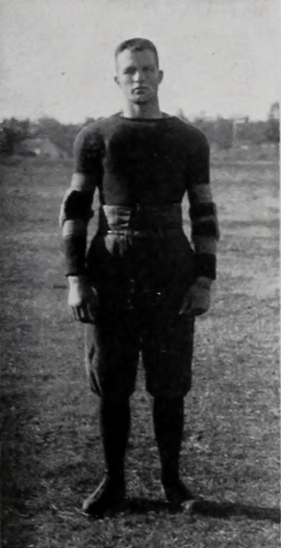
- Potts at Clemson in 1918

No. 10
- Position: Tackle

Personal information
- Born: August 16, 1898; York County, South Carolina, U.S.
- Died: August 11, 1981 (aged 82); Columbia, South Carolina, U.S.
- Listed height: 6 ft 1 in (1.85 m)
- Listed weight: 235 lb (107 kg)

Career information
- High school: Fort Mill (Fort Mill High School)
- College: Clemson, Washington and Lee

Career history
- Frankford Yellow Jackets (1926)

Awards and highlights
- NFL champion (1926)
- Stats at Pro Football Reference

Robert Crockett "Daddy" Potts (August 16, 1898 – August 11, 1981) was an American football player. He played professionally in the National Football League (NFL) for the Frankford Yellow Jackets in the 1926 NFL season. Potts won the 1926 NFL championship with the Yellow Jackets. Outside of the NFL, he played for the Millville Big Blue, a successful independent team out of New Jersey. In 1925 Rae and Millville (sometimes called the Haven-Villa of Winter Haven) played several pick-up games in Florida against the Tampa Cardinals, featuring Red Grange.

Potts played college football at Clemson University and Washington and Lee University.
