= Rae Crowther =

American football player (1902–1980)

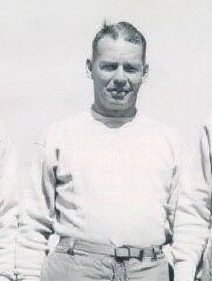
- Crowther in 1937

No. 11
- Position: End

Personal information
- Born: December 11, 1902; Rosemont, Pennsylvania, U.S.
- Died: November 3, 1980 (aged 77); Haddonfield, New Jersey, U.S.
- Listed height: 5 ft 11 in (1.80 m)
- Listed weight: 175 lb (79 kg)

Career information
- College: Colgate; Penn State

Career history
- Frankford Yellow Jackets (1925–1926); Millville Big Blue (1925)

Awards and highlights
- NFL champion (1926); Collyers Eye Mag.: 1st team all-NFL (1925)
- Stats at Pro Football Reference

Rae Crowther (December 11, 1902 – November 3, 1980) was a professional football player for the National Football League (NFL) Frankford Yellow Jackets from 1925 until 1926. He won the 1926 NFL Championship with the Yellow Jackets. Outside of the NFL, he played for the Millville Big Blue, a successful independent team out of New Jersey. In 1925 Rae and Millville played several pick-up games in Florida against the Tampa Cardinals, featuring Red Grange. Rae's brother Saville also played alongside him with Frankford and Millville in 1925.

Rae later became a very successful line coach at Drexel University, Harvard University, and the University of Pennsylvania, which at the time were football powerhouses. In 1932, he became the designer and founder of the football blocking sled, used by many high school, college and professional teams today. His sleds received praise from Green Bay Packers coach, Vince Lombardi, and Woody Hayes of the Ohio State Buckeyes.
