= Leo Douglass =

American football player (1901–1985)

Profile
- Position: Fullback / Tailback

Personal information
- Born: February 13, 1901; Wakefield, Massachusetts, U.S.
- Died: April 3, 1985 (aged 84); Melrose, Massachusetts, U.S.
- Listed height: 5 ft 11 in (1.80 m)
- Listed weight: 190 lb (86 kg)

Career information
- College: Vermont

Career history
- Millville Big Blue (1925); Haven-Villa of Winter Haven (1926); Brooklyn Lions (1926); Frankford Yellow Jackets (1926); Bethlehem Bears (1926)

Awards and highlights
- NFL champion (1926)
- Stats at Pro Football Reference

Leo Frederick Douglass (February 13, 1901 – April 3, 1985) was a professional football who played in the National Football League (NFL) in 1926. Douglass split the 1926 season playing for the Brooklyn Lions and the Frankford Yellow Jackets. He won the 1926 NFL championship when with Yellow Jackets.

Prior to joining the NFL, Douglass played for the Millville Big Blue based in Millville, New Jersey. He scored 8 touchdowns for the Big Blue that season. In January 1926, several members of the team traveled to Florida to play several pick-up games against the Tampa Cardinals, featuring Jim Thorpe. The team that was formed was called the Haven-Villa of Winter Haven, which consisted of many Big Blue players as well as some other from the Frankford Yellow Jackets and the NFL's Pottsville Maroons. Douglass also played for the Bethlehem Bears of the Eastern League of Professional Football in 1926.

Prior to playing professional football, Douglass played college football at Lehigh University and the University of Vermont
