= Two-Bits Homan =

American football player (1898–1953)

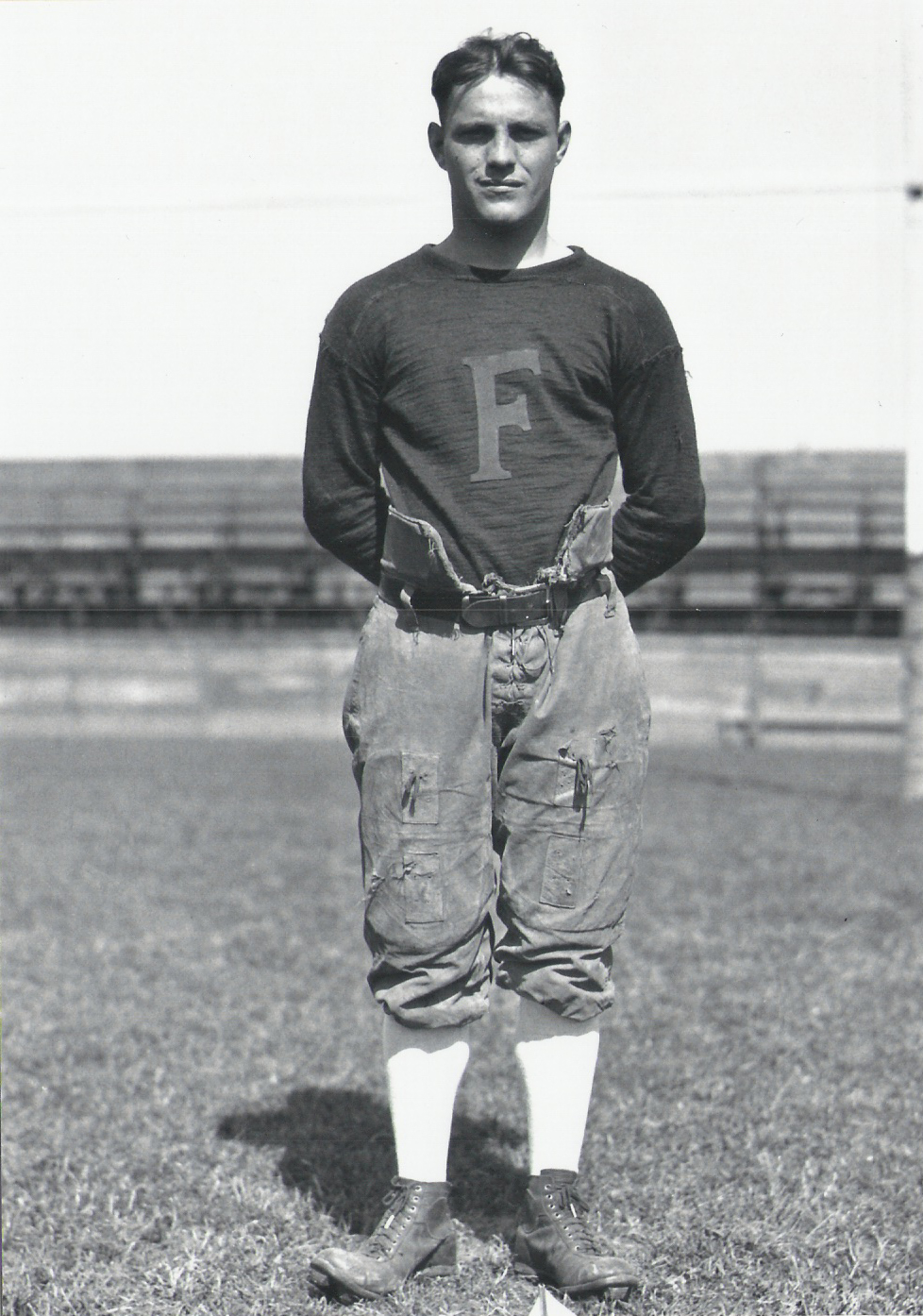
- Henry "Two Bits" Homan, courtesy of Historical Society of Frankford

Profile
- Position: Quarterback / Safety

Personal information
- Born: June 7, 1898; Reading, Pennsylvania, U.S.
- Died: May 11, 1953 (aged 54); Glens Falls, New York, U.S.
- Listed height: 5 ft 5 in (1.65 m)
- Listed weight: 145 lb (66 kg)

Career information
- High school: Lebanon (PA)
- College: Lebanon Valley College

Career history
- Frankford Yellow Jackets (1925–1930); Millville Football & Athletic Club (1925); Haven-Villa of Winter Haven (1926)

Awards and highlights
- NFL champion (1926)
- Stats at Pro Football Reference

Henry "Two-Bits" Homan (June 7, 1898 – May 11, 1953) was a professional American football player. Homan was a college stand-out at Lebanon Valley College where he played quarterback and graduated in 1924. He gained his nickname of "Two Bits" due to his size. Standing at 5 ft 5 in (1.65 m) and weighing in at an average 150 lb (68 kg) throughout his playing day, Homan was one of the smallest players ever in the National Football League (NFL).

Homan joined the NFL in 1925 with the Frankford Yellow Jackets and played his whole career with them until 1930. Though one of the lesser known NFL players, he was one of the most popular Yellow Jacket players. The Yellow Jackets, with Homan, would go on to win the 1926 NFL Championship.

Homan also played football with the independent Millville Football & Athletic Club, a professional football team based in New Jersey in 1925. The team won the "Pro Football Championship of New Jersey" that year. In January 1926, Homan and several other members of the Millville Big Blue, traveled to Florida to play a series of exhibition games. They formed a team called the Haven-Villa of Winter Haven played against Jim Thorpe and his Tampa Cardinals. The team left Florida with a 5-0-1 record.

He was elected into the Lebanon Valley College Athletic Hall of Fame in 1976.

== Season stats ==
(Record of NFL play only)

Year	Age	Team	Games
1925	27	Frankford	15
1926	28	Frankford	6
1927	29	Frankford	16
1928	30	Frankford	11
1929	31	Frankford	17
1930	32	Frankford	14
