= 1928 All-Pro Team =

Official list of the best NFL players in 1928

The 1928 All-Pro Team consisted of American football players chosen by various selectors for the All-Pro team of the National Football League (NFL) for the 1928 NFL season. Teams were selected by, among others, the Green Bay Press-Gazette (GB), based on the results of a questionnaires sent to the league managers and reporters, and the Chicago Tribune (CT).

The Chicago Tribune picked quarterback Benny Friedman as the captain of its team, calling him "not only a great player but a magnificent showman," "a great passer and a field general par excellence."

== Team ==
Position	Player	Team	Selector(s)
Quarterback	Benny Friedman	Detroit Wolverines	GB-1, CT-1
Quarterback	Paddy Driscoll	Chicago Bears	CT-1
Halfback	Verne Lewellen	Green Bay Packers	GB-1, CT-1 [fullback]
Halfback	Wildcat Wilson	Providence Steam Roller	GB-1, CT-1
Fullback	Wally Diehl	Frankford Yellow Jackets	GB-1
End	LaVern Dilweg	Green Bay Packers	GB-1, CT-1
End	Ray Flaherty	New York Yanks	GB-1
End	Cal Hubbard	New York Giants	CT-1
Tackle	Bill Owen	Detroit Wolverines	GB-1, CT-1
Tackle	Bull Behman	Frankford Yellow Jackets	GB-1
Tackle	Gus Sonnenberg	Providence Steam Roller	CT-1
Guard	Mike Michalske	New York Yankees	GB-1, CT-1
Guard	Jim McMillen	Chicago Bears	GB-1, CT-1
Center	Clyde Smith	Providence Steam Roller	GB-1
Center	Joe Wostoupal	Detroit Wolverines	CT-1
