= Lewis F. Castor Jr. =

American businessman and politician (1890–1958)

Member of the Pennsylvania House of Representatives for the 17th Philadelphia County District
- In office 1935–1937
- Preceded by: Sheppard H. Royle
- Succeeded by: Henry M. Dubbs Jr.

Personal details
- Born: July 6, 1890 Philadelphia, Pennsylvania, U.S.
- Died: May 22, 1958 (aged 67) Philadelphia, Pennsylvania, U.S.
- Resting place: William Penn Cemetery; Philadelphia, Pennsylvania, U.S.
- Party: Republican
- Occupation: General contractor

Lewis Frank Castor Jr. (July 6, 1890 – May 22, 1958) was an American businessman who served one term in the Pennsylvania House of Representatives.

Castor was born on July 6, 1890, in Philadelphia. He worked as a general contractor and was the financial secretary of the Frankford Yellow Jackets. He was a director of the poor for the city of Philadelphia from 1921 to 1933 and was elected to the Pennsylvania House of Representatives in 1934. He did not run for reelection in 1936. He died on May 22, 1958, in Philadelphia.
