= Russell Daugherity =

American football player and coach (1902–1971)

Russ Daugherity
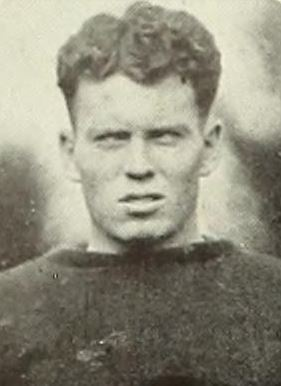
- The Illio, 1927

Profile
- Positions: Fullback, halfback

Personal information
- Born: January 31, 1902; Streator, Illinois, U.S.
- Died: March 17 1971 (aged 69); Duarte, California, U.S.
- Listed height: 5 ft 10 in (1.78 m)
- Listed weight: 175 lb (79 kg)

Career information
- College: Illinois

Career history
- Frankford Yellow Jackets (1927)
- Coaching profile at Pro Football Reference
- Stats at Pro Football Reference

Russell S. "Pug" Daugherity (January 31, 1902 – March 1971) was a professional football player-coach in the National Football League (NFL) for the Frankford Yellow Jackets in 1927.

== Early life and education ==
Daugherity was from Streator, Illinois, the son of Amelia Daugherity. He played football while attending the University of Illinois, where he was also captain of the basketball team. One of his Illinois teammates was Red Grange.

== Career ==
After college, he was signed to the Frankford Yellow Jackets in 1927. He coached basketball at the Rice Institute in Texas, and a candidate for assistant football coach at his alma mater, Streator High School, in 1934.

Daugherity was a salesman later in life, worked in the county highway department, and ran for public office. He was chair of the LaSalle County Young Men's Republican Club. He served in the United States Navy during World War II.

== Personal life and legacy ==
He married Maude Pool in Michigan in 1948. He died in 1971, at the age of 69, in Duarte, California. In 1975, he and his older brother Byron were posthumously inducted into the Streator High School Athletic Hall of Fame.
