= Swede Youngstrom =

American football player and coach (1897–1968)

Profile
- Position: Center / Guard / End / Tackle

Personal information
- Born: May 24, 1897; Waltham, Massachusetts, U.S.
- Died: August 5, 1968 (aged 71); Boston, Massachusetts, U.S.
- Listed height: 6 ft 1 in (1.85 m)
- Listed weight: 187 lb (85 kg)

Career information
- High school: Waltham
- College: Dartmouth

Career history

Playing
- Buffalo All-Americans (1920–1921); Union Club of Phoenixville (1920); Union Quakers of Philadelphia (1921); Canton Bulldogs (1921); Buffalo All-Americans (1922–1923); Buffalo Bisons (1924–1925); Cleveland Bulldogs (1925); Millville Big Blue (1925); Haven-Villa of Winter Haven (1926); Frankford Yellow Jackets (1926–1927)

Coaching
- Frankford Yellow Jackets (1926, assistant); Frankford Yellow Jackets (1927)

Awards and highlights
- NFL champion (1926); 3× First-team All-Pro (1922, 1923, 1924); Consensus All-American (1919)
- Coaching profile at Pro Football Reference
- Stats at Pro Football Reference

Adolf Frederick "Swede" Youngstrom (May 24, 1897 – August 5, 1968) was an American professional football player in the National Football League (NFL). He played college football for the Dartmouth Big Green, earning consensus All-American honors in 1919. Over the span of his NFL career, Youngstrom played with the Buffalo All-Americans, Canton Bulldogs, Buffalo Bisons, Cleveland Bulldogs and the Frankford Yellow Jackets. He also served as a player-coach for the Yellow Jackets in 1927. Outside of the NFL, Youngstrom played pro football for the Millville Big Blue and the Haven-Villa of Winter Haven.

The Professional Football Researchers Association notes of Youngstrom's career that “He was, quite possibly, the best guard of his era, considering that the only guards in the Pro Football Hall of Fame who played during the 1920s—Mike Michalske and Walt Kiesling—actually played the majority of their careers in the 1930s.”

== Early career ==
Swede's first exposure to football came during his time at Waltham High School. The school's football team practiced after classes. Youngstrom then sought his parents' permission to go out for the football team. However his parents refused to let him play. Swede's father feared that his son, who weighed just 140 pounds, would be susceptible to injury.

However, during his senior year at Waltham, Swede joined the team without his parents' consent or knowledge. However, when a local paper included some highlights involving Swede's on-field performance the secret was revealed. Youngstrom's father however did not let on that he knew of his son's involvement with the team. Instead, he sneaked to a Waltham practice session and watched his boy in action. After being impressed by his son's performance, Swede's father permitted him to stay with the team.

== College ==
After high school, Swede entered Dartmouth College in 1914. At Dartmouth, he played every position on the offensive line, however he was best known for playing the guard position. However, he also played on defense as well. Swede's defensive play was also outstanding. He was credited with blocking nine punts in his senior year, three of those blocks came in the 1919 title game against Colgate University. His stellar play earned him a spot on Walter Camp's All-American team.

== The NFL ==
=== Buffalo ===
After graduating, Swede was operating a candy store in Hanover, New Hampshire, with Dartmouth teammate Ed Healey when he was approached by representatives from Buffalo with an offer to play for their 1920 team in the new American Professional Football Association (renamed the National Football League in 1922). During his first season with the All-Americans, Youngstrom is reported to have blocked nine punts, the same number of blocks he attained during his senior year at Dartmouth. Three of those blocks were returned for touchdowns.

In 1922, Youngstrom's play began to attract All-Pro mention. In 1923 the All-Americans went 5–4–3, but Youngstrom's stellar play earned him a spot on the Green Bay Press-Gazette All-Pro team. A year later, Swede ended up being the only bright spot for the Buffalo franchise (now called the Bisons) during terrible season, receiving All-Pro honors for the third consecutive year.

=== Frankford Yellow Jackets ===
In 1926, Youngstrom accepted an offer to play for the Frankford Yellow Jackets. In addition to his duties on the field, Swede was asked to coach the linemen. He spent two seasons with the Jackets, and played a major role in helping the team win the 1926 NFL title. He would then serve as the team's player-coach for the 1927 season.

== Independent football ==
In 1921 the rules governing players in the AFPA were somewhat lax and many players took advantage of this situation by playing for teams in other leagues to make a little extra money between games. Eight members of the Buffalo squad, including Youngstrom) played for a non-league team called the Union Quakers of Philadelphia on Saturdays, then hopped the train for Buffalo and the next day's game. The Quakers played their games on Saturdays because Philadelphia blue laws prohibited professional sports being played on Sunday.

Youngstrom also played for the Millville Big Blue, a professional football team based in Millville, New Jersey from 1921 until around 1928. The team won the mythical "Pro Football Championship of New Jersey" in 1923 and again in 1925. He also played for the Haven-Villa of Winter Haven, a barnstorming team, made up of several Big Blue members.

== Legacy ==
In 2012, the Professional Football Researchers Association named Youngstrom to the PRFA Hall of Very Good Class of 2012, an honor bestowed upon outstanding NFL players not in the Pro Football Hall of Fame.
