= Dinty Moore =

Dinty Moore may refer to:

== People ==
- Dinty Moore, a comic strip character in Bringing Up Father (also known as Jiggs and Maggie) and the eponym of many other "Dinty" Moores
- Charles "Dinty" Moore, American band leader and christener of Red Buttons
- Dinty Moore (American football) (1903-1978), American football player
- Dinty W. Moore (born 1955), American essayist
- Francis Moore (ice hockey) (1900–1976), Canadian hockey player

== Other uses ==
- Dinty Moore, a line of food products by American Hormel Foods
- Dinty Moore sandwich, in the cuisine of Detroit, a sandwich similar to a Reuben sandwich
- F. W. "Dinty" Moore Trophy, a trophy of the Ontario Hockey League
