= Millville Football & Athletic Club =

General information
- Founded: 1921
- Folded: 1928
- Stadium: MSAA Field
- Headquartered: Millville, New Jersey
- Colors: Blue, White

Personnel
- Owners: Millville Football & Athletic Club
- General manager: Virgil Johnson
- Head coach: Mickey Hummel

Nickname
- Big Blue

Team history
- Millville Football & Athletic Club (1921-c1928)

League / conference affiliations
- Independent

Millville Football & Athletic Club also known as the Millville Big Blue was a professional football team based in Millville, New Jersey from 1921 until around 1928. The team won the mythical "Pro Football Championship of New Jersey" in 1923 and again in 1925.

At end of the 1925, several members of the Big Blue traveled to Florida to play a series of exhibition games. After a game against the Tampa Cardinals, a team put together by the legendary Jim Thorpe, they took the name Haven-Villa of Winter Haven. During their time in Florida, the Big Blue comprised a 5-0-1 record.

== Pro Football Hall of Fame ==
- Guy Chamberlin

== Other notable players ==
- Punk Berryman
- Rae Crowther
- Leo Douglass
- Gyp Downey
- Carroll "Ginny" Gooch
- Two-Bits Homan
- Ben Jones
- Elmer McCormick
- Dinty Moore
- Daddy Potts
- Swede Youngstrom
