= Bill Owen (American football) =

American football player (1903–1975)

- Owen, late 1920s

No. 9, 1, 36
- Positions: Tackle, guard, defensive tackle

Personal information
- Born: September 29, 1903; Aline, Oklahoma Territory, U.S.
- Died: March 15, 1975 (aged 71); New Mexico, U.S.
- Listed height: 6 ft 0 in (1.83 m)
- Listed weight: 211 lb (96 kg)

Career information
- College: Oklahoma A&M, Phillips

Career history
- Kansas City Cowboys (1926); Cleveland Bulldogs (1927); Detroit Wolverines (1928); New York Giants (1929–1936)

Awards and highlights
- NFL champion (1934); First-team All-Pro (1928)

Career statistics
- Games played: 138
- Starts: 99
- Stats at Pro Football Reference

William Criswell "Red" Owen (September 29, 1903 – March 15, 1975) was an American football lineman who played in the National Football League (NFL) for the Kansas City Cowboys, Cleveland Bulldogs, Detroit Wolverines, and New York Giants. He was the younger brother of Pro Football Hall of Fame Giants lineman and coach Steve Owen, with whom and for whom he played.

== Early life ==
Bill Owen was born September 29, 1903, in Aline, Oklahoma Territory.

He entered Oklahoma A&M College (today's Oklahoma State University) in 1924 and played football there on the freshman team. In October the red-haired tackle was unanimously elected team captain by his peers to serve in that capacity for the rest of the year.

The following year Owen transferred to Phillips University, a now-defunct religious private school in Enid, Oklahoma, where his brother Steve Owen had been a gridiron star. Owen played for Phillips for only one year, 1925.

== Professional career ==
The professional ranks beckoned, however, and Owen signed a contract to play with the Kansas City Cowboys of the National Football League. He first saw pro action in the fall of 1926, a team which his brother Steve had recently played for before being sold to the New York Giants for $500.

After 1926 the Kansas City franchise folded and Owen followed team manager LeRoy Andrews to the newly relaunched Cleveland Bulldogs for the 1927 season. After one year in Cleveland, Owen would join the Detroit Wolverines for 1928, continuing to play barnstorming games for a percentage of the gate as a member of an NFL All-Star team following the conclusion of the season schedule.

Box score for the October 27, 1929, game against the Providence Steam Roller, listing the Owen brothers together on the Giants line.

In 1929, with the Detroit franchise folding, Owen was relocated as team asset for a third time. This time he became a member of the New York Giants — an NFL franchise entering its fifth season — giving him an opportunity to play on the line with his older brother. Bill broke in with the team as the starting left guard, with Steve the established veteran at the left tackle position.

Although New York would finish the 1929 season with a 13–1–1 record, the Giants' one loss was to the undefeated Green Bay Packers — and in the absence of a post-season championship playoff game, the title was accorded to the Packers.

Steve Owen was made a player-coach by the Giants in 1930. Bill would play the rest of his career under Steve's watchful eye, anchoring the line as the starter at right tackle through 1934.

On December 9, the 1934 Giants, winners in the Eastern Conference with a record of 8–5, faced off at the end of the season to play the undefeated champions of the West, the Chicago Bears. The day was bitter cold and the footing was treacherous, but the Bears managed to slip-slide themselves to a 10–3 lead at halftime. Spotting trouble in the making, prior to the game the Giants had sent a representative to purchase as many pairs of rubber-soled basketball should as could be obtained. Nine pairs had been found at Manhattan College.

Bill Owen was one of the first New York players to try the new footwear out. "You know, they feel pretty good," he announced to his teammates, "maybe they will help." Eight pairs of shoes were ultimately donned. With an advantage in traction, the Giants came back in the second have, with 27 points scored in the final quarter en route to a 30–13 victory. The Owen brothers and the Giants were champions in a game remembered in football lore as "The Sneakers Game."

Owen played the 1935 and 1936 seasons for the Giants as well, seeing action primarily in a reserve capacity. He retired from the sport after the 1936 season, at the age of 33.

== Coaching career ==
Early in 1941, the Giants moved their training camp to Superior, Wisconsin, and hired Bill Owen and his former teammate Mike Palm as assistant coaches. Owen, in charge of coaching the linemen, worked on the staff of his brother Steve, who would remain at the helm of the New York squad through 1953.

== Death and legacy ==
Owen died March 15, 1975, in New Mexico and was buried March 20 in Kinsley, Kansas.

== See also ==
- History of the New York Giants (1925–1978)
