= Sheppard H. Royle =

American politician and sports promoter (1891–1959)

Member of the Pennsylvania House of Representatives
- In office 1925–1935
- Preceded by: James A. Dunn
- Succeeded by: Lewis F. Castor Jr.
- Constituency: 16th Philadelphia County (1925–1933); 17th Philadelphia County (1933–1935)

Personal details
- Born: July 26, 1891 Mays Landing, New Jersey, U.S.
- Died: April 18, 1959 (aged 67) Meadowbrook, Pennsylvania, U.S.
- Party: Republican
- Occupation: Textile manufacturer

Sheppard Herbert Royle (July 26, 1891 – April 18, 1959) was an American manufacturer, politician, and sports promoter from Philadelphia.

== Early life ==
Royle was born on July 26, 1891, in Mays Landing, New Jersey. He was educated in the School District of Philadelphia. In 1913 he was an incorporator of the Royle-Craven Co., a textile manufacturer. In 1914 he incorporated another textile company, George Royle & Co., with George Royle and George Royle Jr. From May 8, 1918, to December 19, 1918, Royle was a gunner in the United States Army.

== Frankford Yellow Jackets ==
In 1920, Royle was elected president of Frankford Athletic Association, which owned the Frankford Yellow Jackets professional football team. The Yellow Jackets were one of the strongest independent football teams in the country, losing only 3 games between 1920 and 1923. In 1922, the FAA spent $100,000 to construct Frankford Stadium. The Yellow Jackets were admitted to the National Football League in 1924 and Royle was elected to the NFL's executive committee in 1928. In 1926, Royle was succeeded as president by Theodore E. Holden, but remained on the Frankford Athletic Association's board of directors and was given the title of honorary president.

== Politics ==
Royle was elected to the Pennsylvania House of Representatives in 1924 and was reelected to 4 consecutive terms. He did not run for reelection in 1934 and later served as a property assessor for the Philadelphia County, Pennsylvania Board of Revision of Taxes.
