= Nation Ford High School =

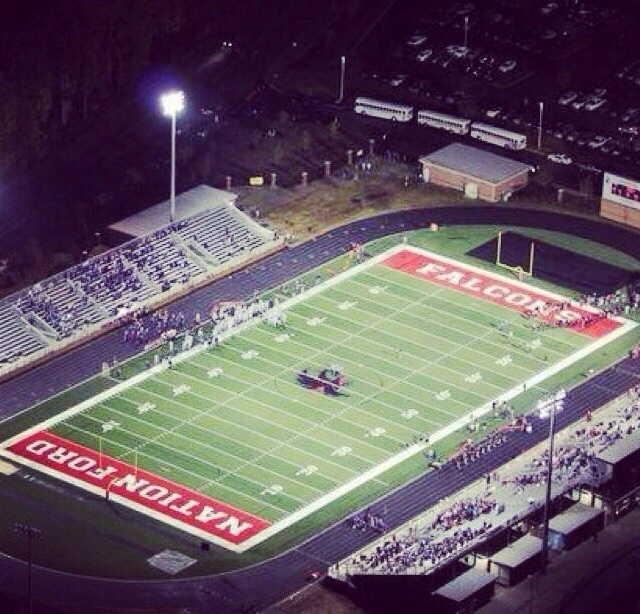

Location
- 1400 A.O. Jones Blvd; Fort Mill, South Carolina 29715; United States; 35°02′48″N 80°55′06″W

Information
- Other name: NFHS, nafo
- Type: Public high school
- Established: 2007 (19 years ago)
- School district: York County School District 4
- NCES School ID: 450390001103
- Principal: Chris Chandler
- Teaching staff: 135.30 (on an FTE basis)
- Grades: 9–12
- Enrollment: 1,871 (2023–2024)
- Student to teacher ratio: 13.83
- Colors: Red and black
- Mascot: Falcon
- Nickname: Falcons, NAFO
- Accreditation: Southern Association of Colleges and Schools
- Newspaper: The Talon
- Yearbook: The Ford
- Website: nfhs.fortmillschools.org

Nation Ford High School (NFHS) is a public high school in Fort Mill, South Carolina. It is part of the York County School District 4. It takes its name from the historic Nation Ford Road.

== Academics ==
The school is accredited by both the state of South Carolina as well as the Southern Association of Colleges and Schools. It offers over 200 courses, including Advanced Placement, dual credit, honors, college-preparatory and applied technology courses.

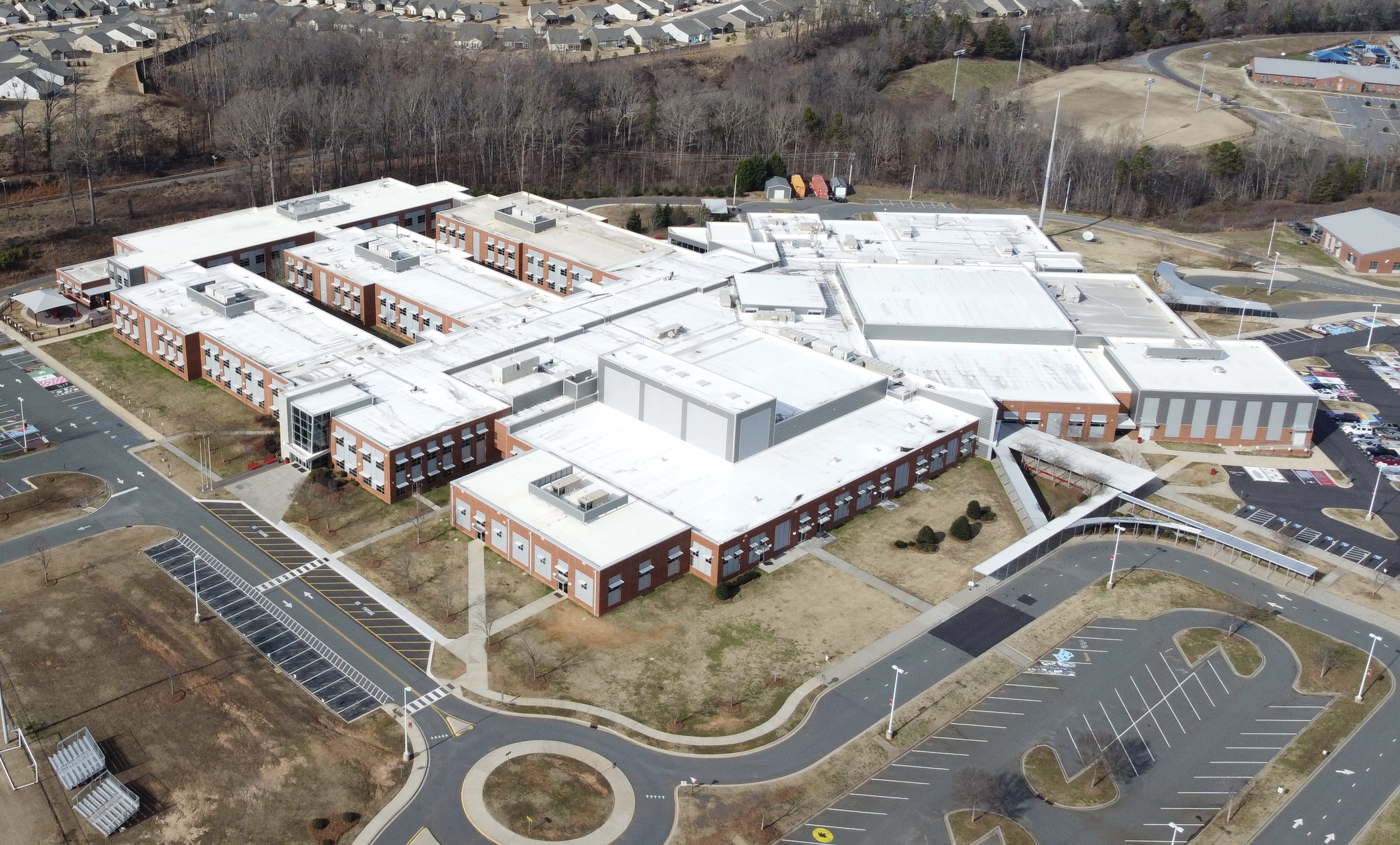
Aerial of Nation Ford High School

== Athletics ==
Nation Ford High School is a member of the SCHSL. Athletic teams include swim, volleyball, softball, football, soccer, cross country, track, tennis, golf, lacrosse, wrestling, and basketball.

=== State championships ===
- Boys Cross Country: 2026
- Boys Lacrosse: 2023
- Softball: 2011
- Boys Swimming: 2008
- Volleyball: 2010, 2018, 2019

== Marching band ==
The school's marching band was 2009, 2010, and 2011 South Carolina 3A State Marching Band Champions. The band has also won the 2013, 2015-2017, 2019 and 2021 state championships in the 4A category. In the year of 2024, the band won another state championship title in the 5A category. Additionally, the school's band has marched in the Macy's Thanksgiving Day parade in 2011 and 2017.

The band has a record of performances on the national stage with the BOA (Bands of America) organization, performing regionally between 2011 and 2022, taking a short break in 2020 due to the COVID-19 virus.
