= New American High Schools =

National recognition program for US secondary schools

NAHS logo.

The New American High Schools initiative, started in 1996 under the direction of the United States secretary of education Richard W. Riley, is a national recognition program for United States secondary schools.

== Description ==
In 1996, 1998, 1999, and 2000, a varying number of high schools were selected and honored with the title of "New American High School showcase site" at the White House; they are intended to serve as models for schools that have achieved high levels of success. In addition to receiving national recognition, each winning school receives a stipend and technical assistance from the United States Department of Education.

No new awards have been given since 2000.

== List of showcase sites ==
The following is an exhaustive list of sites that have been awarded the New American High School designation:

=== 1996 (10 sites) ===
- Chicago High School for Agricultural Sciences, Chicago, Illinois
- David Douglas High School, Portland, Oregon
- Encina High School, Sacramento, California
- Fenway Middle College High School, Boston, Massachusetts
- St. Louis Career Academy, St. Louis, Missouri
- High School of Economics and Finance, New York, New York
- Sussex Technical High School, Georgetown, Delaware
- Thompson School District, Loveland, Colorado
- Walhalla High School, Walhalla, South Carolina
- William H. Turner Technical Arts High School, Miami, Florida

=== 1998 (7 sites) ===
- Adlai E. Stevenson High School, Lincolnshire, Illinois
- Coronado High School, Coronado, California
- DeBakey High School for Health Professions, Houston, Texas
- Greene JROTC Academy, Dayton, Ohio
- Marine Academy of Science and Technology, Sandy Hook, New Jersey
- Newman Smith High School, Carrollton, Texas
- Saunders Trades and Technical High School, Yonkers, New York

=== 1999 (13 sites) ===
- Angola High School, Angola, Indiana
- Brooklyn Technical High School, Brooklyn, New York
- East Grand Rapids High School, Grand Rapids, Michigan
- Eastern Technical High School, Baltimore, Maryland
- Eleanor Roosevelt High School, Greenbelt, Maryland
- Fox Chapel Area High School, Pittsburgh, Pennsylvania
- MAST Academy, Miami, Florida
- Niceville High School, Niceville, Florida
- Northeast Magnet High School, Wichita, Kansas
- Rex Putnam High School, Milwaukie, Oregon
- Sir Francis Drake High School, San Anselmo, California
- South Grand Prairie High School, Grand Prairie, Texas
- The School of Environmental Studies at the Minnesota Zoo, Apple Valley, Minnesota

=== 2000 (27 sites) ===
- Academy for the Arts, Science and Technology, Myrtle Beach, SC
- Aliso Niguel High School, Aliso Viejo, CA
- Beverly Hills High School, Beverly Hills, CA
- Chugach School District, Anchorage, Alaska
- Fort Mill High School, Fort Mill, SC
- Fred J. Page High School, Franklin, TN
- Fredericksburg High School, Fredericksburg, TX
- Grapevine High School, Grapevine, TX
- Irvington High School, Fremont, California
- John Dewey High School, Brooklyn, NY
- Judson High School, Converse, TX
- Laguna Creek High School, Elk Grove, CA
- Lake Orion High School, Lake Orion, MI
- Las Vegas Academy of International Studies, Visual and Performing Arts, Las Vegas, NV
- Leland High School, San Jose, CA
- Los Fresnos High School, Los Fresnos, TX
- Menchville High School, Newport News, VA
- New Technology High School, Napa, California
- Paint Branch High School, Burtonsville, MD
- Palatine High School, Palatine, IL
- Palos Verdes Peninsula High School, Rolling Hills Estates, CA
- Reynolds High School, Troutdale, OR
- Swain County High School, Bryson City, NC
- Torrey Pines High School, San Diego, CA
- Troy High School, Fullerton, CA
- Upper St. Clair High School, Upper St. Clair, PA
- Urban Academy Laboratory High School, New York, NY
