= York County School District 4 =

School district in South Carolina, United States

York County School District 4 Fort Mill School District

Address
- 2233 Deerfield Drive Fort Mill, South Carolina, 29715; United States

District information
- Type: Public school district
- Grades: PK–12
- Superintendent: Chuck Epps
- Schools: 20
- NCES District ID: 4503900

Students and staff
- Enrollment: 15,011 (2017-2018)
- Teachers: 989.20 (on an FTE basis)
- Student–teacher ratio: 15.17

Other information
- Website: www.fortmillschools.org

Fort Mill School District, officially known as York County School District 4, is a public school district in Fort Mill, South Carolina, United States. It also serves students from Lake Wylie and Tega Cay.

== Schools ==
The district is currently made up of eleven elementary schools, six middle schools, and three high schools. Below is a complete list of component schools:

Elementary

- Doby's Bridge Elementary School
- Fort Mill Elementary School
- Gold Hill Elementary School
- Kings Town Elementary School
- Orchard Park Elementary School
- Pleasant Knoll Elementary School
- River Trail Elementary School
- Riverview Elementary School
- Springfield Elementary School
- Sugar Creek Elementary School
- Tega Cay Elementary School

Middle

- Banks Trail Middle School
- Forest Creek Middle School
- Fort Mill Middle School
- Gold Hill Middle School
- Pleasant Knoll Middle School
- Springfield Middle School

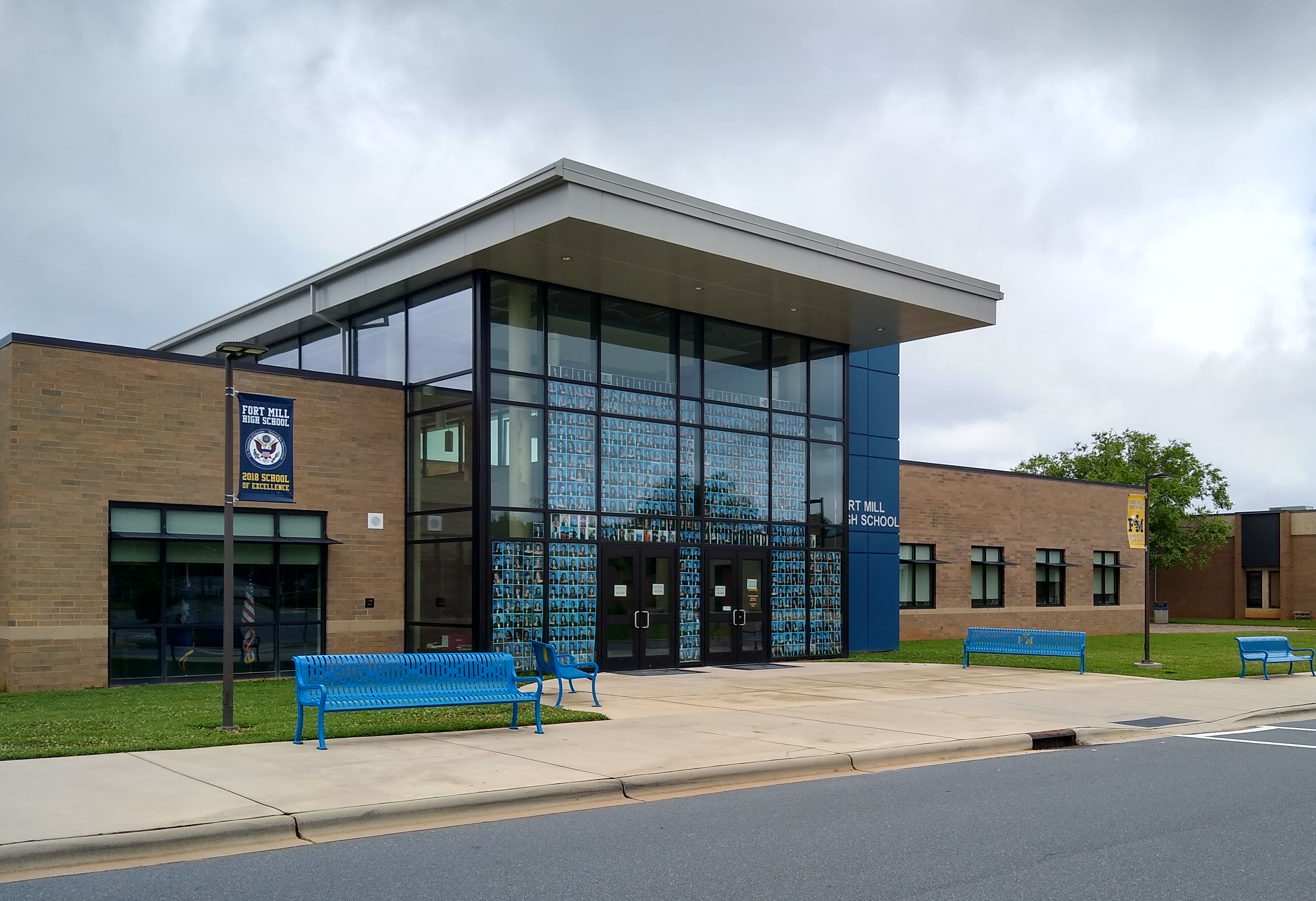
Fort Mill High School

High

- Fort Mill High School
- Nation Ford High School
- Catawba Ridge High School

== Awards ==
In 2000, Fort Mill High School was awarded New American High School designation meaning the United States Department of Education recognized it as one of the nation's best high schools and a model to other schools.
