= Fort Mill High School =

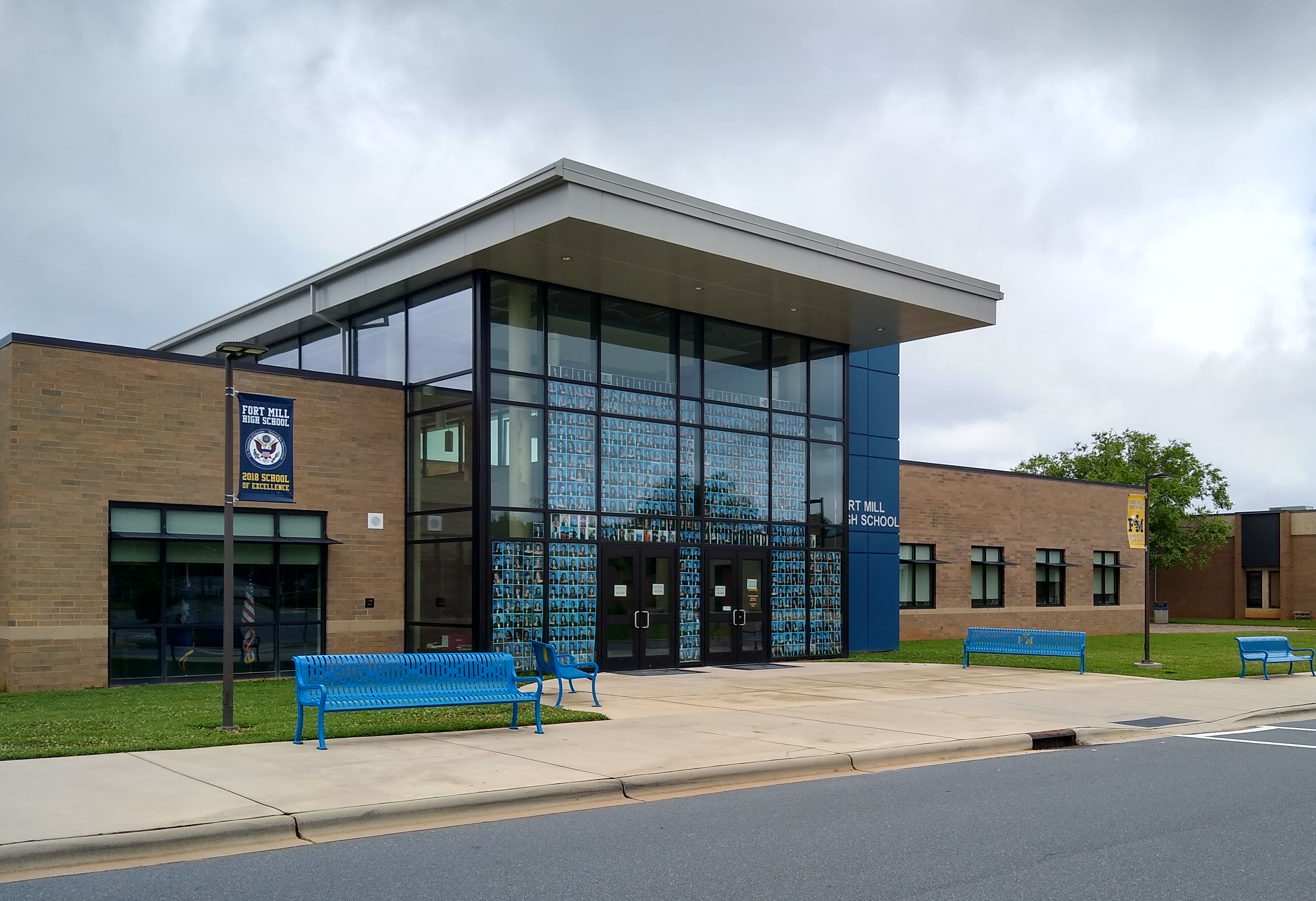
- Front of Fort Mill High School in 2020

Location
- 215 North Highway 21 ByPass; Fort Mill, South Carolina 29715; United States; 35°00′51″N 80°57′56″W

Information
- Other name: FMHS
- Type: Public high school
- Established: 1930 (96 years ago)
- School district: York County School District 4
- NCES School ID: 450390001156
- Principal: Zachary Beam
- Teaching staff: 135.50 (on an FTE basis)
- Grades: 9–12
- Enrollment: 2,041 (2023–2024)
- Student to teacher ratio: 15.06
- Campus type: Suburban
- Colors: blue and gold
- Mascot: Yellow Jackets
- Publication: Illusion
- Newspaper: The Loudspeaker
- Yearbook: Yejacka
- Website: fmhs.fortmillschools.org

Fort Mill High School (FMHS) is a public high school in Fort Mill, South Carolina, United States. It is part of the York County School District 4.

== Achievements ==
Two-time National Blue Ribbon School – 2004, 2018

=== Marching Band ===
24 South Carolina Marching Band State Championships:

Class 4A Champions—2003, 2004, 2005, 2009, 2012, 2014
Class 3A Champions—1981, 1985, 1986, 1987, 1989, 1990, 1991, 1992, 1993, 1995, 1996, 1997, 1998, 1999
Class 2A Champions—1976, 1977, 1982, 1983

3-time Bands of America Regional Champion: Akron, Ohio in 2011, Powder Springs, Georgia in 2015, and Winston-Salem, NC in 2017. 7-time Band Grand National Semi-Finalist: 1992, 2000, 2002, 2003, 2005, 2016, and 2017. Marching Band 2005 Western Carolina Tournament of Champions Champion.

The Fort Mill High School Marching Band has also been featured in the Macy's Thanksgiving Parade, The Pasadena Rose Parade, has traveled to Dublin, Ireland to perform in the 2013 and 2023 St. Patrick's Parade, and performed at the American Military Cemetery in Normandy, France in 2016.

=== State Championships ===
- Baseball: 1960, 1961, 2002
- Basketball–Boys: 1974, 2007
- Cross Country – Boys: 2006, 2021, 2024
- Cross Country – Girls: 2010, 2023, 2024
- Golf–Boys: 1976, 1984, 1985, 1986, 1988
- Lacrosse–Boys: 2011, 2014, 2019
- Lacrosse–Girls: 2012
- Soccer–Boys: 2012, 2024
- Softball: 2022
- Swimming–Boys: 2005, 2006, 2010, 2011, 2023
- Swimming–Girls: 2022, 2023, 2024
- Tennis–Boys: 1995, 1996, 1997, 1998, 1999
- Track–Girls: 2011, 2025
- Wrestling: 2023, 2024, 2025

== Notable alumni ==
- Ernest Dixon — former NFL linebacker
- Cheslie Kryst — Miss USA 2019
- Robert "Daddy" Potts — former NFL player
- Isabella Robusto — racecar driver competing full-time in the ARCA Menards Series in the No. 55 car for Nitro Motorsports
- Charlie Rymer — professional golfer who played on the PGA Tour
- Melvin Stewart — two-time Olympic gold medalist swimmer, co-founder of SwimSwam
- Vance Walker — former NFL defensive end and Super Bowl 50 champion with the Denver Broncos
- Billy Mays - renowned as-seen-on-TV salesperson and TV personality
