= Harry Dayhoff =

American football player (1896–1963)

Profile
- Positions: Halfback, Fullback, Quarterback

Personal information
- Born: May 25, 1896; Gettysburg, Pennsylvania, U.S.
- Died: February 17, 1963 (aged 66); Harrisburg, Pennsylvania, U.S.
- Listed height: 5 ft 8 in (1.73 m)
- Listed weight: 170 lb (77 kg)

Career information
- College: Bucknell

Career history
- 1924: Frankford Yellow Jackets
- 1925: Pottsville Maroons

Awards and highlights
- Disputed NFL champion (1925)

Harry Oscar Dayhoff (May 25, 1896 - February 17, 1963) was a professional football player from Gettysburg, Pennsylvania. He attended Bucknell University and later made his professional debut in the National Football League (NFL) with the Frankford Yellow Jackets in 1924. In 1925 he played for the Pottsville Maroons and won the 1925 Championship with the team before the title was stripped from the team due to a disputed rules violation.
