= Al Bedner =

American football player (1898–1988)

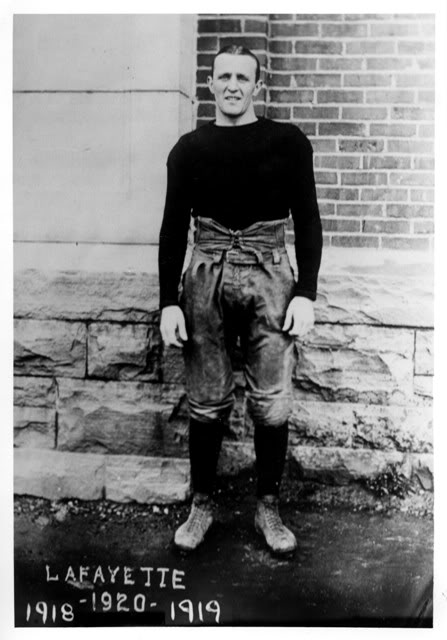

No. 17, 3, 30
- Position: Guard / Tackle

Personal information
- Born: July 9, 1898; Wilkes-Barre, Pennsylvania, U.S.
- Died: July 12, 1988 (aged 90); Wilkes-Barre, Pennsylvania, U.S.
- Listed height: 5 ft 10 in (1.78 m)
- Listed weight: 195 lb (88 kg)

Career information
- High school: Wilkes-Barre (Pennsylvania)
- College: Lafayette (1917—1920)

Career history
- Frankford Yellow Jackets (1924); New York Giants (1925–1926)
- Stats at Pro Football Reference

Albert Leon Bedner (July 9, 1898 – July 12, 1988) was an American professional football player who played three seasons in the National Football League (NFL) with the Frankford Yellow Jackets and New York Giants. He played college football at Lafayette College.

== Early life ==
Albert Leon Bedner was born on July 9, 1898, in Wilkes-Barre, Pennsylvania. He played high school football for four years at Wilkes-Barre High School in Wilkes-Barre. He was inducted into the Luzerne County Sports Hall of Fame in 2007.

== College career ==
Bedner played college football at Lafayette College from 1917 to 1920, and was a four-year letterman. He also participated in wrestling, boxing, and track in college. He earned honorable mention All-American honors in football in 1919.

== Professional career ==
Bedner played for Mt. Carmel’s of the Coal region League in 1921, Thomas A.C. of Bethlehem in 1922, and Shenandoah in 1923.

Bedner signed with the Frankford Yellow Jackets of the National Football League (NFL) in 1924, and played in six games for the team during the 1924 season. He was released in 1924.

Bedner signed with the NFL's New York Giants in 1925. He appeared in nine games, starting two, for the Giants during their inaugural 1925 season. He played in eight games in 1926.

== Personal life ==
Bedner served in the United States Navy. He sold real estate and insurance after his football career. He died on July 12, 1988, in Wilkes-Barre.
