= Bull Behman =

American football player and coach (1900–1950)

Profile
- Positions: Tackle, guard, kicker

Personal information
- Born: January 15, 1900; Steelton, Pennsylvania, U.S.
- Died: March 24, 1950 (aged 50); Harrisburg, Pennsylvania, U.S.
- Listed height: 5 ft 10 in (1.78 m)
- Listed weight: 215 lb (98 kg)

Career information
- High school: Steelton (PA)
- College: Lebanon Valley, Dickinson

Career history

Playing
- Frankford Yellow Jackets (1924–1925); Philadelphia Quakers (1926); Frankford Yellow Jackets (1927–1931)

Coaching
- Frankford Yellow Jackets (1929–1931) Head coach

Awards and highlights
- 2× First-team All-Pro (1928, 1929)

Head coaching record
- Regular season: 13–20–7 (.413)
- Coaching profile at Pro Football Reference
- Stats at Pro Football Reference

Russell K. "Bull" Behman (January 15, 1900 – March 24, 1950) was an American professional football player and coach in the early National Football League (NFL). He played college football at Lebanon Valley College in 1920 and 1921, and at Dickinson College in 1922 and 1923, captaining the team in the latter year.

In 1924, Behman joined the Frankford Yellow Jackets, a long-established team but then new to the NFL. He emerged as a placekicker in 1925, hitting on five field goals and twelve PAT's. In 1926, he jumped to the new American Football League's Philadelphia Quakers, but when that league folded after one season, he returned to Frankford. He was twice named a first-team All-Pro. In 1929, he assumed the role of player-coach, still playing the line on both offense and defense and dropping back to punt. The following year, as the team began to run into financial problems, Behman resigned. His career NFL coaching record was 13–20–7.
