= Wally Diehl =

American football player (1905–1954)

Profile
- Position: Fullback

Personal information
- Born: January 1, 1905; Mount Carmel, Pennsylvania
- Died: May 29, 1954 (aged 49)

Career information
- College: Bucknell

Career history
- Frankford Yellow Jackets (1928–1930)

Awards and highlights
- All-Pro (1928); Bucknell Hall of Fame (1980)

Career statistics
- Games played: 38
- Games started: 30
- Touchdowns: 11

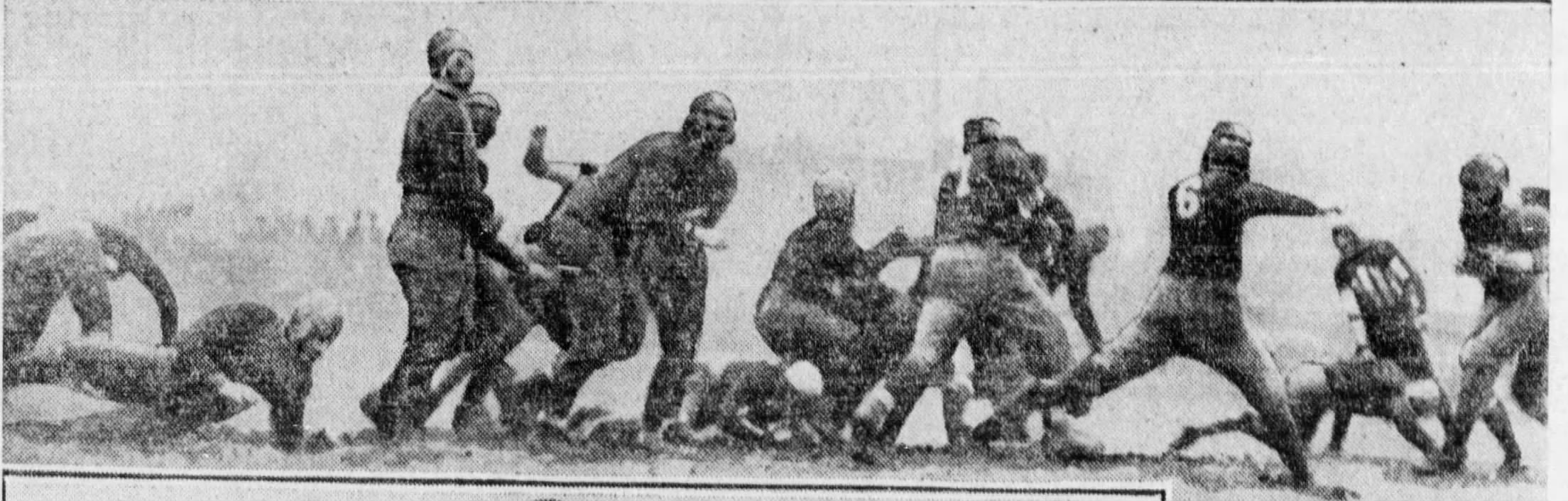
Caption text says "Wally Diehl, hero of the Yellow Jackets' victory over the Dayton Triangles in their opening clash hereabouts, is shown in the top picture darting thraugh [sic] a neat hole at tackle created for him by the Messrs. Behman and Keslos working in conjunction."

Glenn Walter "Wally" Diehl (January 1, 1905 – May 29, 1954) was a professional American football fullback in the National Football League. He played three seasons for the Frankford Yellow Jackets (1928–1930).
