= Dinty Moore (American football) =

American football player (1903–1978)

Profile
- Positions: Halfback, Quarterback

Personal information
- Born: September 30, 1903; New York, New York, United States
- Died: April 1978 (aged 74); Forest Hills, New York
- Listed height: 5 ft 8 in (1.73 m)
- Listed weight: 160 lb (73 kg)

Career information
- College: Lafayette

Career history
- 1925: Millville Big Blue
- 1927: Pottsville Maroons

Walter Stanley "Dinty" Moore (September 30, 1903 - April 1978) was a professional football player from New York City. He attended and played college football for Lafayette College and made his National Football League debut in 1927 with the Pottsville Maroons. He played only one season for the Maroons before ending his NFL career.
