= Red Grange =

American football player (1903–1991)

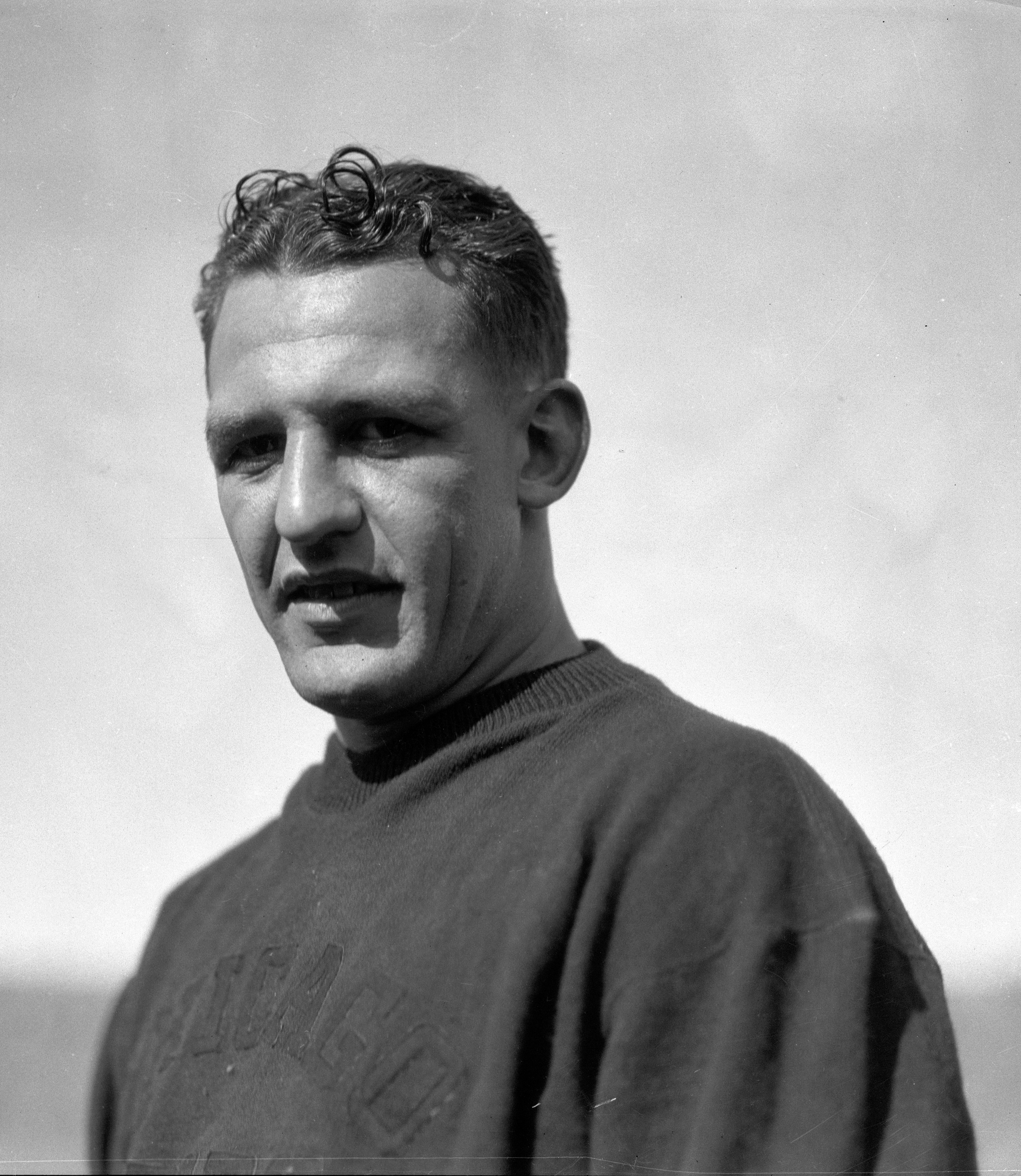
- Grange in 1926

No. 77
- Position: Halfback

Personal information
- Born: June 13, 1903; Forksville, Pennsylvania, U.S.
- Died: January 28, 1991 (aged 87); Lake Wales, Florida, U.S.
- Listed height: 6 ft 0 in (1.83 m)
- Listed weight: 180 lb (82 kg)

Career information
- High school: Wheaton (Wheaton, Illinois)
- College: Illinois (1923–1925)

Career history

Playing
- Chicago Bears (1925); New York Yankees (1926–1927); Chicago Bears (1929–1934)

Coaching
- Chicago Bears (1935–1937) Backfield coach

Operations
- New York Yankees (1926–1927) Co-owner

Awards and highlights
- 2× NFL champion (1932, 1933); 2× First-team All-Pro (1930, 1931); NFL 1920s All-Decade Team; Chicago Bears No. 77 retired; 100 greatest Bears of All-Time; National champion (1923); Unanimous All-American (1924); 2× Consensus All-American (1923, 1925); Big Ten Most Valuable Player (1924); 3× First-team All-Big Ten (1923–1925); Illinois Fighting Illini No. 77 retired

Career NFL statistics
- Rushing touchdowns: 21
- Receiving touchdowns: 10
- Passing touchdowns: 10
- Defensive touchdowns: 1
- Stats at Pro Football Reference
- Pro Football Hall of Fame
- College Football Hall of Fame

Harold Edward "Red" Grange (June 13, 1903 – January 28, 1991), nicknamed "the Galloping Ghost" and "the Wheaton Iceman", was an American college and professional football halfback who played for Illinois, the Chicago Bears and the short-lived New York Yankees. His signing with the Bears helped legitimize the National Football League (NFL). Grange became a nationally known celebrity in the 1920s and is often cited as one of the most iconic athletes of all time, as well as one of the greatest college football players ever and the biggest star of the early days of the NFL.

Playing college football for the Illinois Fighting Illini, Grange was a three-time consensus All-American and led his team to a national championship in 1923. He was the only unanimous All-American selection in 1924, making him the first player in college football history to receive that honor. The same year, Grange became the first recipient of the Chicago Tribune Silver Football award as the Big Ten Conference's most valuable player. In 2008, Grange was named the best college football player of all time by ESPN, and in 2011, he was named the Greatest Big Ten Icon by the Big Ten Network.

Shortly after his final college game in 1925, Grange joined the Bears and the NFL, embarking on a barnstorming tour that raised professional football's profile across the country. When his rookie contract expired, he and agent C. C. Pyle formed the American Football League in 1926, with Grange playing for the Yankees. The league lasted just one year before shutting down and the Yankees were assimilated into the NFL. Grange suffered a serious knee injury in 1927 that prevented him from playing the following season, but he returned to the Bears in 1929. A two-way halfback during the NFL's one-platoon era, he played both offense and defense for his entire career. He was involved in two iconic plays: he caught the controversial game-winning touchdown from fullback Bronko Nagurski in the 1932 NFL Playoff Game to win the league title for the Bears, and made the game-winning tackle on Red Badgro in the 1933 NFL Championship Game. He remained with Chicago until he ended his playing career in 1934, after which he became a backfield coach for the Bears for three seasons.

Grange is a charter member of both the College and Pro Football Halls of Fame.

== Early life ==
Red Grange was born on June 13, 1903, in Forksville, Pennsylvania, a village of about 200 people among lumber camps. His father, Lyle, was the foreman of three lumber camps. His mother died when he was just five years old. For several years, the Grange family lived with relatives until they could finally afford a home of their own in Wheaton, Illinois. In Wheaton, Lyle became the chief of police.

In four years at Wheaton High School, (Note: The site of the original Wheaton Grade School and Wheaton High School housed in the same physical building constructed in 1874 and in operation with classes in 1876 is now known as Longfellow Elementary School.) Grange earned 16 varsity letters in football, baseball, basketball, and track; he scored 75 touchdowns and 532 points for the football team. As a high school junior, Grange scored 36 touchdowns and led Wheaton High School to an undefeated season. In his senior year, his team won every game but one in which they lost 39–0 to Scott High School in Toledo, Ohio. Knocked out in this game, Grange remained unconscious for two days, having difficulty speaking when he awoke. Grange was also an all-state track and field runner. In 1920, he was a state champion in the high jump and placed third and fourth in the 100-yard dash and the 220-yard dash, respectively. In 1921, he won the state title in both the long jump and the 100-yard dash, and in 1922, he placed third in the 100-yard dash and won the 220-yard dash. In a 1974 interview with American Heritage, Grange stated that he ran the 100-yard dash in 9.8 seconds [at the time this was just one-fifth of a second off the world (and American) records].

To help the family earn money, he took a part-time job as an ice toter for $37.50 per week, a job which helped him to build his core strength and from which he got the nicknames "Ice Man" and "the Wheaton Ice Man."

== University of Illinois ==
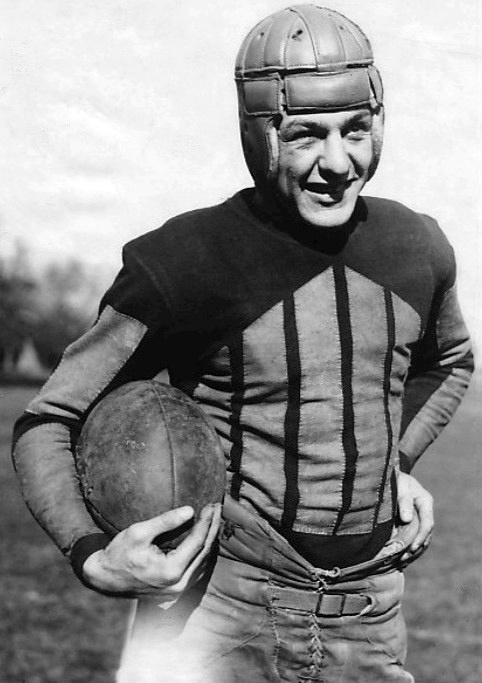
Grange in 1923

After graduation, Grange enrolled at the University of Illinois, where he joined the Zeta Psi fraternity. At first he had planned to compete only in basketball and track, but changed his mind once he arrived and joined coach Bob Zuppke's Fighting Illini football team. Grange was the roommate of college basketball player and future college basketball coach John Mauer. Grange also modeled for local men's clothing store, Jos. Kuhn and Co., as a floor model, common for Illini athletes at the time, and was an amateur boxer. Grange played for the team from 1923 to 1925. In his first collegiate football game, he scored three touchdowns against Nebraska. In seven games as a sophomore, he ran for 723 yards and scored 12 touchdowns, and led Illinois to an undefeated season and the Helms Athletic Foundation national championship. His younger brother Garland also played football for the school.

He drew national attention for his performance in the October 18, 1924, game against Michigan, in the grand opening game of the new Memorial Stadium, built as a memorial to Illini students and alumni who had died in World War I. The Michigan Wolverines entered the game as favorites, having won a national title the previous year. Grange returned the opening kickoff for a 95-yard touchdown. He then scored three more touchdowns on runs of 67, 56, and 44 yards, all in the first 12 minutes of the game. In the second half, Grange scored a fifth touchdown on an 11-yard run and also threw a 20-yard touchdown pass. To top it off, playing defense, he intercepted two passes. Michigan coach Fielding Yost said, "All Grange can do is run," to which Zuppke, referring to a famed opera star of the age, responded, "And all Galli-Curci can do is sing."

The game inspired Grantland Rice to write this poetic description:

A streak of fire, a breath of flame
Eluding all who reach and clutch;
A gray ghost thrown into the game
That rival hands may never touch;
A rubber bounding, blasting soul
Whose destination is the goal — Red Grange of Illinois!

Chicago sportswriter Warren Brown nicknamed Grange "The Galloping Ghost". When asked in a 1974 interview, "Was it Grantland Rice who dubbed you the Galloping Ghost?" Grange replied, "No, it was Warren Brown, who was a great writer with the Chicago American in those days."

=== 1925 season ===
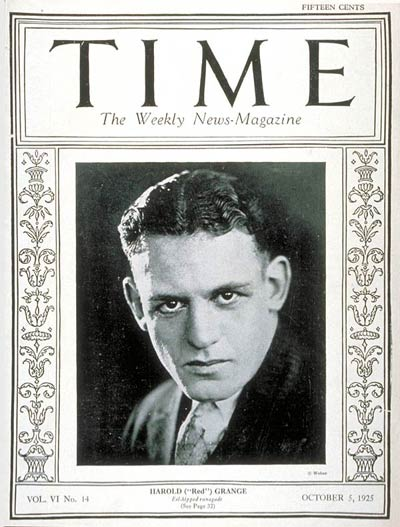
Grange on the October 5, 1925 cover of Time magazine

Before the 1925 season, Grange was approached by Champaign movie theater owner C. C. Pyle, who asked, "How would you like to make one hundred thousand dollars, maybe even a million?" After Grange agreed, he was told to stay in contact but remain silent on their meeting. Grange and Pyle eventually came to an agreement that they would split all proceeds 60–40, with Pyle paying all promotional expenses out of his share.

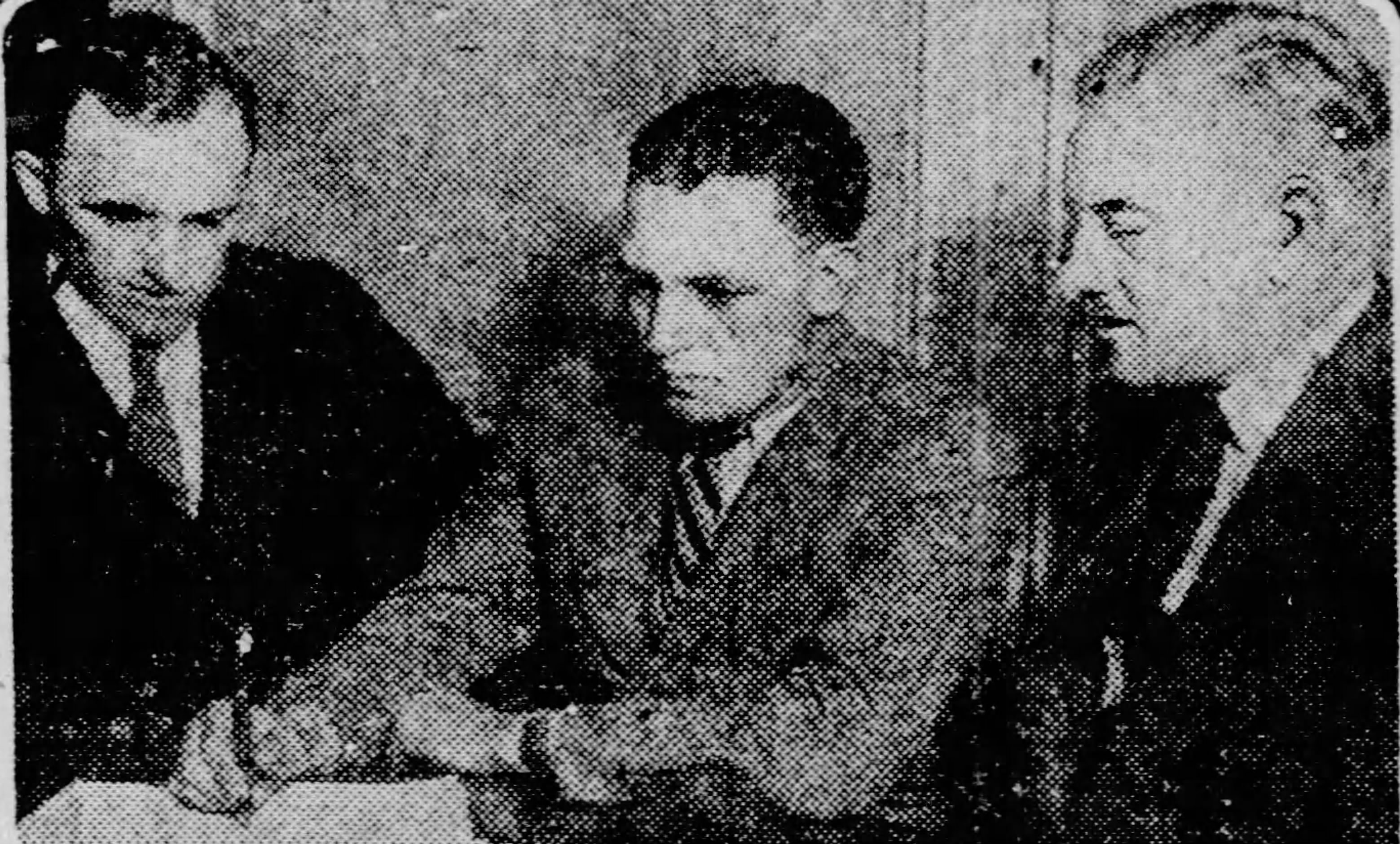
Grange (center) signing his contract with the Bears, while C. C. Pyle (right) and George Halas (left) look on

Pyle traveled to Chicago to meet Chicago Bears owners George Halas and Edward Sternaman to outline a professional contract for Grange, organizing a barnstorming tour that spanned 19 games and 67 days, including games in Florida. As part of their agreement, the Bears received 50 percent of the ticket gate, while Pyle and Grange got the other half. Pyle returned to Champaign shortly afterwards and let Grange know that arrangements had been made for him to join the Bears after his last game playing for Illinois.

Considering Grange's popularity, rumors began surrounding his future after completing his senior year, including professional football and acting. A petition was also created to convince him to run for the Republican Party's at-large nomination for the 70th United States Congress; although he was only 22 years old at the time, supporters argued he would be within six months of the minimum age of 25 when the Congress opened in December 1927. Despite the speculation, Grange and those connected with him tried to dodge any inquiries that might affect his college athlete eligibility; when approached about a career in pro football, he denied it. He also turned down a potential college coaching career owing to low pay.

Featuring a roster of mostly sophomores and backups, the Illini opened the season 1–3, including losing 14–0 in the season opener to Nebraska for their first loss at Memorial Stadium. This was followed by a 16–13 win over Butler and two straight losses to Iowa and Michigan; although Grange was contained against Nebraska and Michigan, he scored two touchdowns against Butler and on the opening kickoff against Iowa. During the Michigan game, Zuppke moved Grange to quarterback, but was a "marked man" in the defeat.

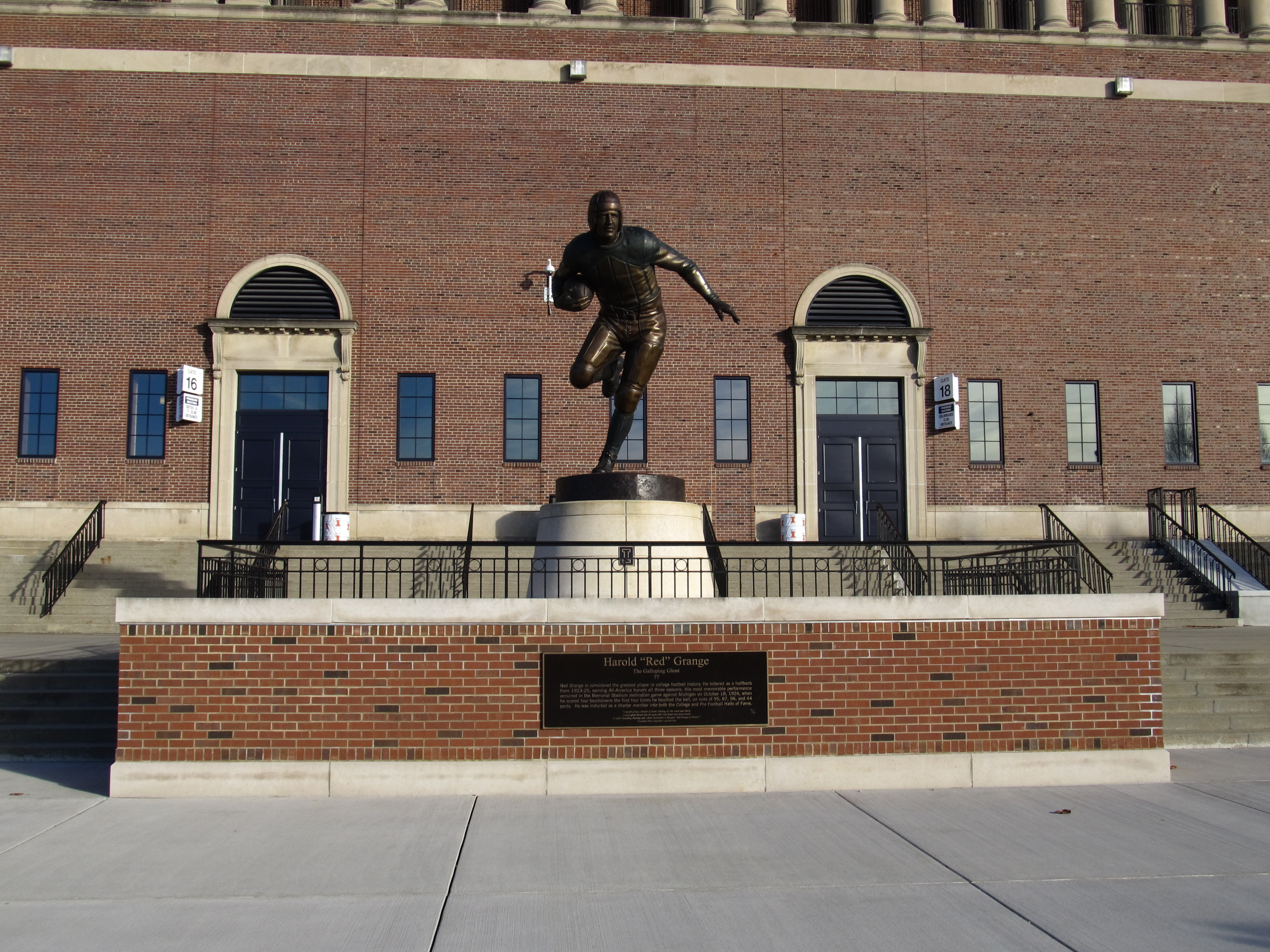
Statue of Grange outside Memorial Stadium in Champaign, Illinois

In the Illini's next game against the University of Pennsylvania, they faced a Quaker team considered one of the best in the eastern United States. In front of 60,000 fans, Grange recorded a career-high 237 yards through deep mud and scored three touchdowns; Penn struggled to keep up, prompting some Illinois lineman to call "Illinois rules the East!" prior to each play. On one play, Grange debuted the flea flicker, a trick play designed by Zuppke in which fullback Earl Britton received the snap from a fake field goal formation, which he threw to right end Chuck Kassel, who lateraled back to Grange and ran for the score. As Illinois won 24–2, Laurence Stallings, a famed war correspondent for the New York World, said, "This story's too big for me. I can't write it."

Columnist Damon Runyon wrote in his game recap, "This man Red Grange of Illinois is three or four men, and a horse rolled into one for football purposes. He is Jack Dempsey, Babe Ruth, Al Jolson, Paavo Nurmi and Man o'War. Put them all together. They spell Grange." When the team returned the next Monday, a contingent of 20,000 that included students and the mayors of Urbana and Champaign greeted them; when Grange tried to dodge the crowd, he was spotted and carried to his fraternity house. After the game, his number 77 was retired by the University of Illinois. (Note: Only one other number has been retired in the history of Illinois football: 50, worn by Dick Butkus, another Bears player.)

Against the Chicago Maroons, Grange recorded –8 total rushing yards and 64 all-purpose yards in abysmal conditions. The following week against Wabash, he only appeared in the fourth quarter to call signals and did not record stats, as the backups played much of the game.

Grange's final college game came against Ohio State in Columbus. Before the game, the Champaign News-Gazette conducted an interview with Grange and confronted him about signing a professional contract, which he firmly denied before leaving. In Columbus, Grange restricted himself to his hotel room to avoid the media, including having a teammate impersonate him for a pre-game parade. NFL President Joseph Carr, who had owned the local NFL team Columbus Panhandles, considered attending the game before he was hospitalized with appendicitis. In front of 85,000 fans, Grange recorded 113 rushing yards on 21 carries and 42 passing yards on nine throws as Illinois won 14–9.

In his 20-game college career, Grange ran for 3,362 yards, caught 14 passes for 253 yards, and completed 40 of 82 passes for 575 yards. Of his 31 touchdowns, 16 were from at least 20 yards, with nine from more than 50 yards. He scored at least one touchdown in every game he played but the Nebraska game. He earned All-America recognition three consecutive years and appeared on the cover of Time on October 5, 1925.

=== Statistics ===
In 2002, the NCAA published "NCAA Football's Finest," researched and compiled by the NCAA Statistics Service. For Grange they published the following statistics:

Year	Carries	Rush yards	Average	Pass attempts	Completions	Pass yards	Interceptions	Plays	Total offense	Touchdowns	Points
1923	129	726	5.6	9	4	36	0	138	762	12	72
1924	113	743	6.6	44	26	433	4	157	1,176	13	78
1925	146	605	4.1	29	10	106	7	175	711	6	36
Total	388	2074	5.4	82	40	575	11	470	2649	33	186

== Professional career ==
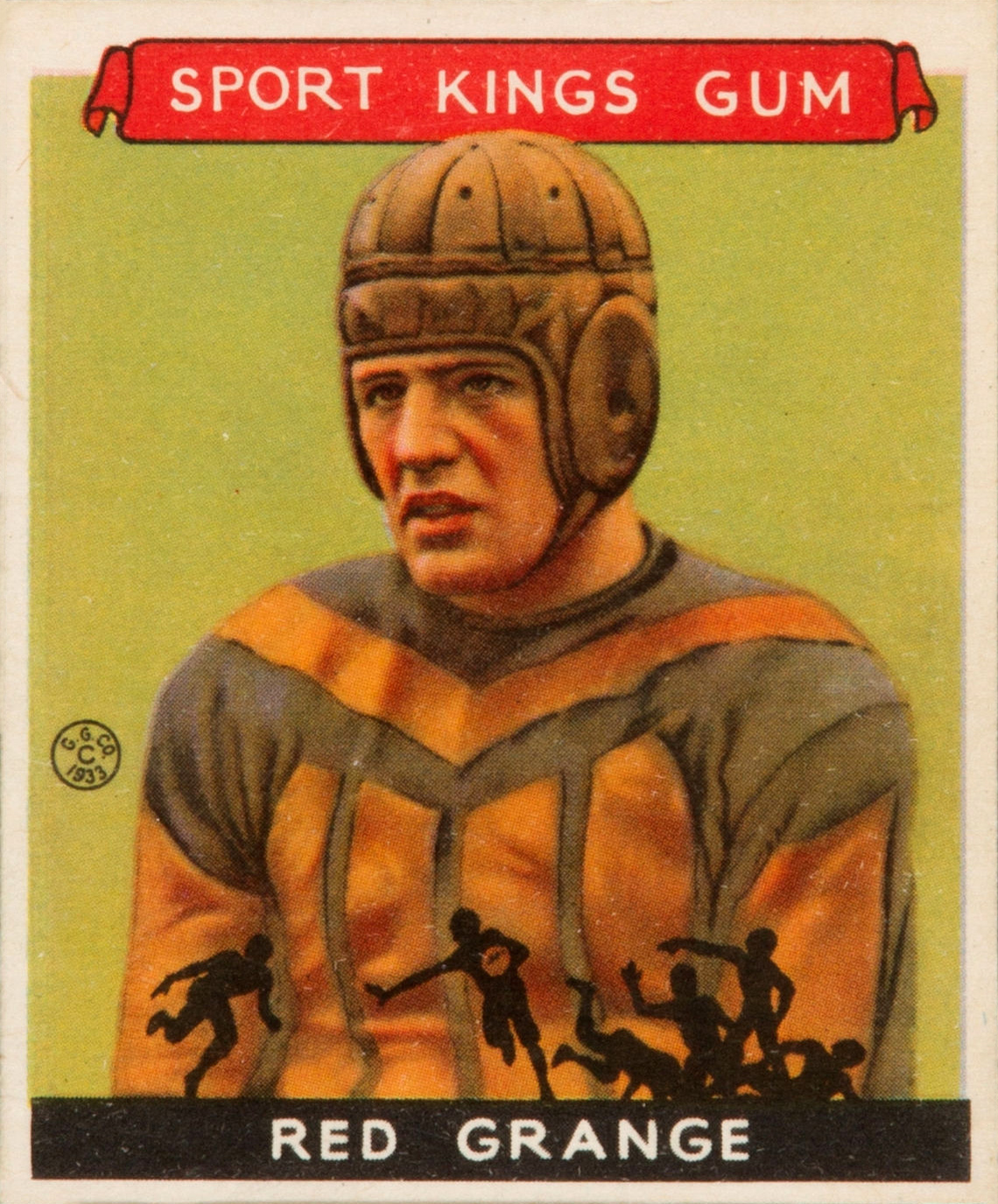
Grange's trading card

After the 1925 Ohio State game, Grange formally announced his intention to sign with the Chicago Bears, but other NFL teams also expressed interest in signing him. The Rochester Jeffersons made a last-ditch effort to sign him at a salary of $5,000 per game, but were unable to do so, a key factor in the team's demise. The New York Giants also reportedly offered him $40,000, a claim denied by team executive Harry March while owner Tim Mara noted the NFL did not allow college players to sign with teams and also had limits on how much money a team could offer. Still, Mara visited Chicago the same day that Grange signed with the Bears and secured a game against them in December.

Grange's decision was vilified by those in college football; at the time, professional football was viewed as a commercialized, weaker brand of its college counterpart. Head coaches Amos Alonzo Stagg and Yost of the University of Chicago, University of Michigan, University of Illinois athletic director George Huff, and Zuppke were noted opponents. Yost once commented, "I'd be glad to see Grange do anything else except play professional football." During their return to their hotel from the Ohio State game, Zuppke repeatedly ordered their taxi driver to take various routes to prolong the ride and allow him to convince Grange to reconsider his decision. In response, Grange questioned why he should not be allowed to be paid for playing football if Zuppke was receiving pay as a coach. The two would not meet again until an Illini team banquet weeks later; during his speech, Zuppke openly criticized Grange, prompting an incensed Grange to leave. In January 1926, Herbert Reed of The Outlook wrote an article titled "De-Granging Football" that used Grange's surname as a verb: to "grange" a game means to exploit it.

On November 22, he formally hired Pyle as his agent and signed with the Bears. The contract earned him a salary and share of gate receipts that amounted to $100,000, during an era when typical league salaries were less than $100/game. Prior to joining his new teammates, he attended the Bears' game against the Green Bay Packers at Cubs Park, a game they won 21–0. Former Yale player Tim Callahan also announced he had secured Grange for a December Florida league he had organized.

Grange is the last player to play both college football and in the NFL in the same season. In 1926, the NFL passed the "Red Grange Rule" to forbid further players from doing the same, along with requiring NFL hopefuls' graduating classes to have left college, though both clauses would be tested in various instances. In 1930, the Bears signed Notre Dame fullback Joe Savoldi although he had withdrawn from school and been kicked off the team, a violation of the Grange Rule's graduating class prerequisite. The Bears argued that since Savoldi had been expelled, he was technically no longer a member of his Class of 1931; the team would be fined $1,000 for each game Savoldi played in. The NFL also maintained the rule prohibiting players from appearing in college and NFL games in the same season when TCU running back Kenneth Davis attempted to join the league after being suspended one game into his senior year in 1986.

=== The barnstorming tour ===
==== December tour ====
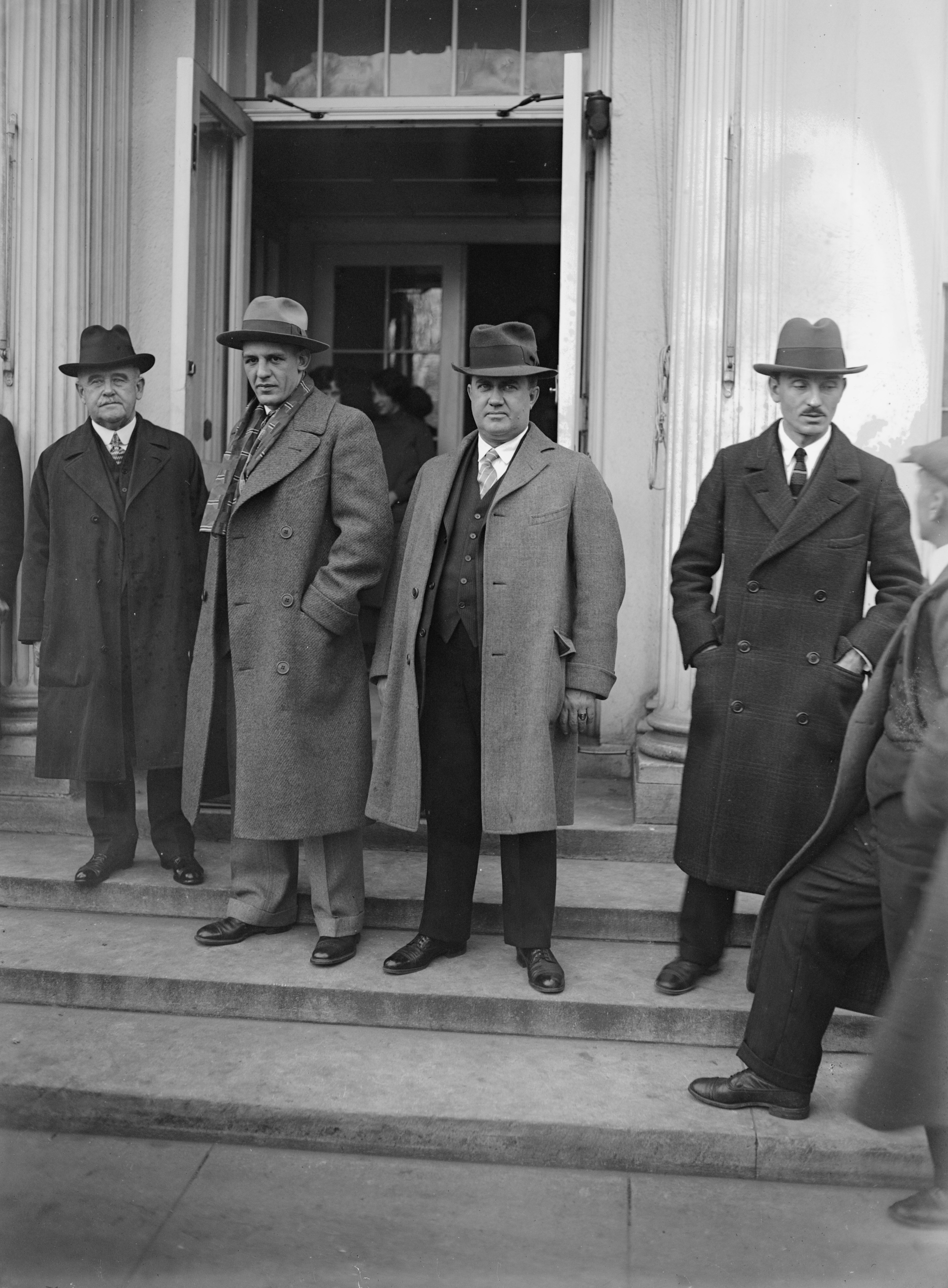
Grange (second from left) with U.S. Senator William B. McKinley and U.S. Representative William P. Holaday in Washington, D.C. in 1925 when McKinley introduced Grange and the Chicago Bears to President Calvin Coolidge.

Grange made his National Football League debut on November 26, Thanksgiving Day, against the Chicago Cardinals. With only three days of practice in the Bears' T formation (he had played in the single wing offense in college), he recorded 92 rushing yards and an interception in the scoreless tie. A crowd of 40,000 attended the game. In the next game against the Columbus Tigers, he threw a touchdown pass and recorded 171 yards as the Bears won 14–7. Shortly after, Britton signed with the Bears, reuniting him with Grange.

In December, the Bears' schedule grew with eight games between December 2 and 13, including three against local all-star teams. The first game, against the Donnelly All-Stars at Sportsman's Park in St. Louis, saw Grange score four touchdowns in a 39–6 blowout. On December 5, he scored two touchdowns including the game-winner against the Frankford Yellow Jackets. The next day, between 65,000 and 73,000 people showed up at the Polo Grounds to watch Grange, helping save the Giants' franchise from financial debt. Grange scored a touchdown on a 35-yard interception return in the Bears' 19–7 victory. Offensively, he ran for 53 yards on 11 carries, caught a 23-yard pass, and completed two of three passes for 32 yards. Before their next game against a Washington, D.C. all-star team, Pyle and Grange elected to remain in New York to promote themselves, receiving various endorsements.

In Washington, D.C., the Bears visited President Calvin Coolidge; when he was introduced to the team and shook hands with Grange, Coolidge responded, "Glad to meet you. I always did like animal acts." Although the Bears defeated Washington 19–0, Grange recorded only 16 rushing yards, no receiving and return yards, failed to complete a pass attempt (including one interception), and missed a field goal.

Despite the victories, the grueling schedule led to a rise in injuries. Grange had been hit in the left arm during the Giants game, causing it to swell by the team's next game against the Providence Steam Roller. The pain from the injury was too great for Grange, who could not bring himself to return a punt and allowed it to sail over his head; he was eventually pulled in the 9–6 loss. The match was widely criticized by fans and media, with one article commenting the "Grange bubble appears dangerously near the bursting point. Beneath the withering, pitiless spotlight of publicity, the red-headed youngster's fame may melt away like some of his own ice, leaving only a little dank, malodorous saw-dust." College football figures proclaimed the game as evidence of professional football's inferiority; referee E. J. O'Brien described it as a "dismal failure." However, others like Princeton and Yale University players Herbert Treat and Carl Flanders defended the sport and the Bears. Flanders added that, in his view, professional football had "a bright future."

"I was booed for the first time in my football career in the Boston game," Grange wrote in his autobiography. "It made me aware of something I had never thought of before—that the public's attitude toward a professional football player is quite different from the manner in which they view a college gridder. A pro's performance is evaluated much more critically and he is less likely to be forgiven when a mistake is made. A pro must deliver, or else."

Following the game, Grange hired E. B. Cooley as his personal doctor. Cooley was the father of Grange's friend and personal adviser Marion "Doc" Cooley, who was serving the position alongside their university classmate Dinty Moore. At Grange's father's request, his close friend Lyman "Beans" DeWolf also joined the team as a confidant.

The Bears' next game against a Pittsburgh all-star group saw the team in poor condition; before kickoff, former All-American Bo McMillin visited the team in the locker room and advised Grange to not play upon seeing his arm. At the start, only ten players were on the field, forcing Halas to choose between two injured linemen to serve as the required 11th man; center George Trafton was selected as he was able to at least stand and walk. Trainer Andy Lotshaw, who had never played football, was called upon to play tackle. Twelve minutes into the game, Grange attempted to block for halfback Johnny Mohardt, but suffered a torn ligament and a broken blood vessel in his arm, the latter of which resulted in artery hemorrhaging. The Bears ultimately lost 24–0.

With Grange hurt, Chicago canceled a game against an all-star team in Cleveland, prompting the organizer to sue for breach of contract. Although Grange expressed confidence in playing the next game against the Detroit Panthers, he was forced to miss it after a blood clot developed in his arm; the Bears lost 21–0. The final game of the December tour against the Giants ended in a 9–0 defeat. "No other team before or since has ever attempted such a grueling schedule as the 1925 Bears and I'm sure never will," Grange wrote in his autobiography.

In ten games, the Bears went 5–4–1.

==== January tour ====
On December 21, the Bears traveled to Florida to play in Callahan's Florida league. To avoid further injuries like in the first tour, the team elected to have week-long breaks between stretches in which they played games on consecutive days. In their first game four days later against a Coral Gables, Florida team, Grange scored the lone touchdown and recorded 89 rushing yards in the 7–0 win.

In the days leading to the next game against the Tampa Cardinals on January 1, 1926, rumors surfaced of Grange participating in a boxing match, but he did not accept. The evening before the game, Grange, driving a car accompanied by golfers Jim Barnes and Johnny Farrell and Olympic swimmer Helen Wainwright, was arrested for speeding at 65 miles per hour (105 km/h) (the speed limit was 45 mph (72 km/h)). The four were released after Grange gave the police officer $25. In the Bears' 17–3 victory over the Cardinals, he scored on a 70-yard touchdown run.

Before departing Tampa, Grange and Pyle invested $17,000 apiece in real estate to capitalize on the Florida land boom of the 1920s, but hurricanes led to the period's end. The day after the Cardinals game, the Bears played a Jacksonville team featuring former Stanford All-American Ernie Nevers. Although Nevers excelled in the game, Grange threw a 30-yard touchdown pass in the 19–6 win.

Following a one-week rest period, the Bears took on a Southern-based all-star team in New Orleans. Grange had 136 rushing yards and a touchdown, along with a 51-yard punt return that was nullified by a holding penalty, as the Bears shut out New Orleans 14–0. Afterwards, the team went to Los Angeles to play the Los Angeles Wildcats, led by Washington Huskies football star George "Wildcat" Wilson, an admirer of Grange who agreed to participate as the game offered the chance to play against him. Wilson would also lead future opponents on the tour in San Francisco, Portland, and Seattle. With approximately 65,000 in attendance at the Los Angeles Memorial Coliseum, the Bears defeated the Tigers 17–7 as Grange scored a touchdown. The Bears followed by winning 14–0 against a team in San Diego, a game in which Grange considered himself "listless throughout" until he recorded a two-yard touchdown in the fourth quarter. Against the San Francisco Tigers in Kezar Stadium, he was limited to 41 rushing yards and threw an interception in the 14–9 loss.

In Portland, Grange and Britton combined for five touchdowns, including three by the latter. Grange threw a 15-yard touchdown pass to Laurie Walquist and ran 45 yards for a second, but exited the 60–3 win before halftime after getting hurt in a pile-up.

On January 31, a day after the Portland game, the Bears played the Seattle All-Stars. Grange scored two touchdowns (36-yard run and 31-yard pass) and recorded 99 rushing yards in the 34–0 victory, while Wilson and teammate Rollie Corbett suffered injuries; the latter broke his leg, leading to Grange, Pyle, and Wilson establishing a fund to support him. The three donated $50 each.

The Bears went 8–1 in the late December and January tour. Immediately following the Seattle game, Pyle issued Grange's final rookie check of $50,000. In his rookie season, Grange made approximately $125,000. "Charlie had kept his word. Now I thought I could go on to make it a million," Grange wrote in his autobiography.

==== Impact on professional football ====
Grange's barnstorming tours are generally considered to have saved the NFL and professional football, though detractors have criticized this narrative considering his injuries and unimpressive performances.

In a February 1926 article, the Chicago Tribune's Don Maxwell wrote that although Grange was typically outperformed by his teammates while attendance for the Florida games was poor and organizers lost money, his star status drew interest, especially on the West Coast, and the money he made was more than he "could have made in any other business in the same period." On the other hand, in 1991, Vito Stellino of The Baltimore Sun compared Grange's decision to join the NFL to Herschel Walker electing to sign with the newly formed United States Football League in the 1980s; although Walker was a popular name, the USFL ultimately collapsed. Stellino instead suggested television helped grow the NFL, while Grange's legend was "too embedded into the American sports psyche to disprove now. Anyway, it's a better story than the reality."

According to football historian John M. Carroll, critics believed the tours created the notion that professional football was a circus led by certain superstars, which posed a risk to such players should they decide to play while injured. Others feared games could be fixed to favor the star players, with Brooklyn Dodgers owner/player Shipwreck Kelly alleging he had reached an agreement with Halas and the Bears to let Grange make a long run in a 1934 postseason exhibition game. However, Carroll also added Grange helped expedite the NFL's growth:

Because there are so many variables to consider, it is difficult to state with certainty Grange's role in the rise of professional football. We can safely say that Grange did not save a faltering NFL in 1925. The preponderance of evidence suggests that Grange's emergence as pro football's first real superstar propelled the NFL and pro football in general forward in establishing the game as a major league sport. The line of progress was halting and certainly Grange was only one of the forces that contributed to the rise of pro football. But Grange deserves some of the accolades accorded him as a pivotal individual in the emergence of the professional game.

In 1985, Grange emphasized the tours' importance to the NFL but noted that the league offered little support to the players from the era: "I complained a few times, because we had guys in hospitals, guys who had had amputations because of football injuries. Guys who had problems. I thought the game could have done something for them, but it never did. As far as I know, pro football hasn't done anything for anybody except lately, and that's mostly for itself. I never made a real stink about it, but I was sad for the oldtimers."

=== New York Yankees and the American Football League ===
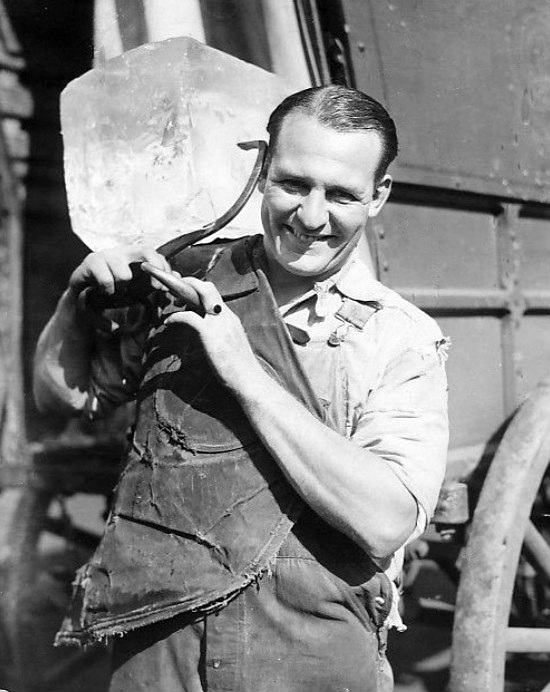
Grange delivering ice in his hometown of Wheaton, Illinois in 1930; during the offseason, he continued his ice toting job to earn extra money.

After the January tour, Pyle approached George Halas and Dutch Sternaman about buying an interest in the Bears, but was turned down. In response, he and Grange attempted to form their own team, the New York Yankees, and gain entry into the NFL. Although they acquired a five-year lease to play at Yankee Stadium, Mara intervened as he felt the Yankees infringed on his Giants' territorial rights.

To challenge the NFL, Grange and Pyle formed the nine-team American Football League. Wilson, who had been approached by Pyle about becoming his client, joined the league as a member of the Wildcats, while Grange's Bears teammates Mohardt and Joey Sternaman played for the Chicago Bulls. In 1926, the Yankees went 9–5 to finish second in the standings.

After the season, the team embarked on a ten-game barnstorming tour to Texas and California alongside Wilson's Wildcats. In late December, in what Grange wrote was "about the only memorable part of the tour", he and his teammates were arrested in Dallas for disturbing the peace and reportedly being intoxicated, the latter of which the group denied; Grange explained the incident transpired when the team visited a hotel at 4 AM after being recommended the spot as a nightlife location by a local policeman. After the players were ordered by the hotel manager to leave the lobby for the noise they were creating, the police confronted them and the ensuing argument led to officers throwing teammate Pooley Hubert. They were eventually arrested and jailed, but were released after paying $10 as they had to play a game in Beaumont that day.

The AFL shut down after one season and the Yankees were added to the NFL. On October 17, 1927, the Yankees were shut out 12–0 by the Bears in Chicago. With a minute remaining in the game, Grange suffered a severe knee injury when he was hit by center George Trafton while trying to catch a pass from Eddie Tryon. As he landed, Grange's cleat caught in the field, causing him to twist his knee when Trafton fell on him. Revealed to be a torn tendon, he underwent a diathermy to treat it after water started to form. The injury ultimately affected Grange's speed and running ability, though he remained serviceable for the rest of his career. "After it happened, I was just another halfback," Grange commented.

Four weeks after the Bears game, Grange returned against the Cardinals at quarterback to honor his contract. Although his injury worsened, the Yankees won 20–6 and he ultimately finished the season. After the year, he and the Yankees participated in another barnstorming tour against West Coast teams led by Wilson and Benny Friedman. Grange explained his decision to keep playing in his autobiography: "At the young age of twenty-four, I refused to believe that I couldn't bounce back to my old form. I was positive I could play myself back into shape. But those additional games only served to further aggravate my condition and, when the tour was ended, it became apparent I had done irreparable damage to the knee. For the first time since I was hurt, nearly four months before, I began worrying over the possibility that I might be through as a football player."

=== Later career ===
The contract between Pyle and Grange expired in January 1928, but Grange decided not to renew due to his injury and withdrew his stake in the Yankees. Without Grange, the Yankees went 4–8–1 before shutting down for financial reasons. Grange missed the entire 1928 season before returning to the Bears for 1929.

The two highlights of Grange's later NFL years came in consecutive championship games. In the unofficial 1932 championship, Grange caught the game-winning touchdown pass from Bronko Nagurski. It was argued the pass was illegal. In the 1933 championship, Grange made a touchdown-saving tackle that saved the game and the title for the Bears.

He was a very modest person, who insisted that even the ordinary plumber or electrician knows more about his craft than he does. He said he could not explain how he did what he did on the field of play, and that he just followed his instincts.

Upon ending his playing career in 1934, Grange became the backfield coach for the Bears. Although Halas had offered him the team's head coaching position, he declined as he "never had any ambition to be a head coach in either the professional or college ranks." He remained in the position until 1937.

== Acting career ==
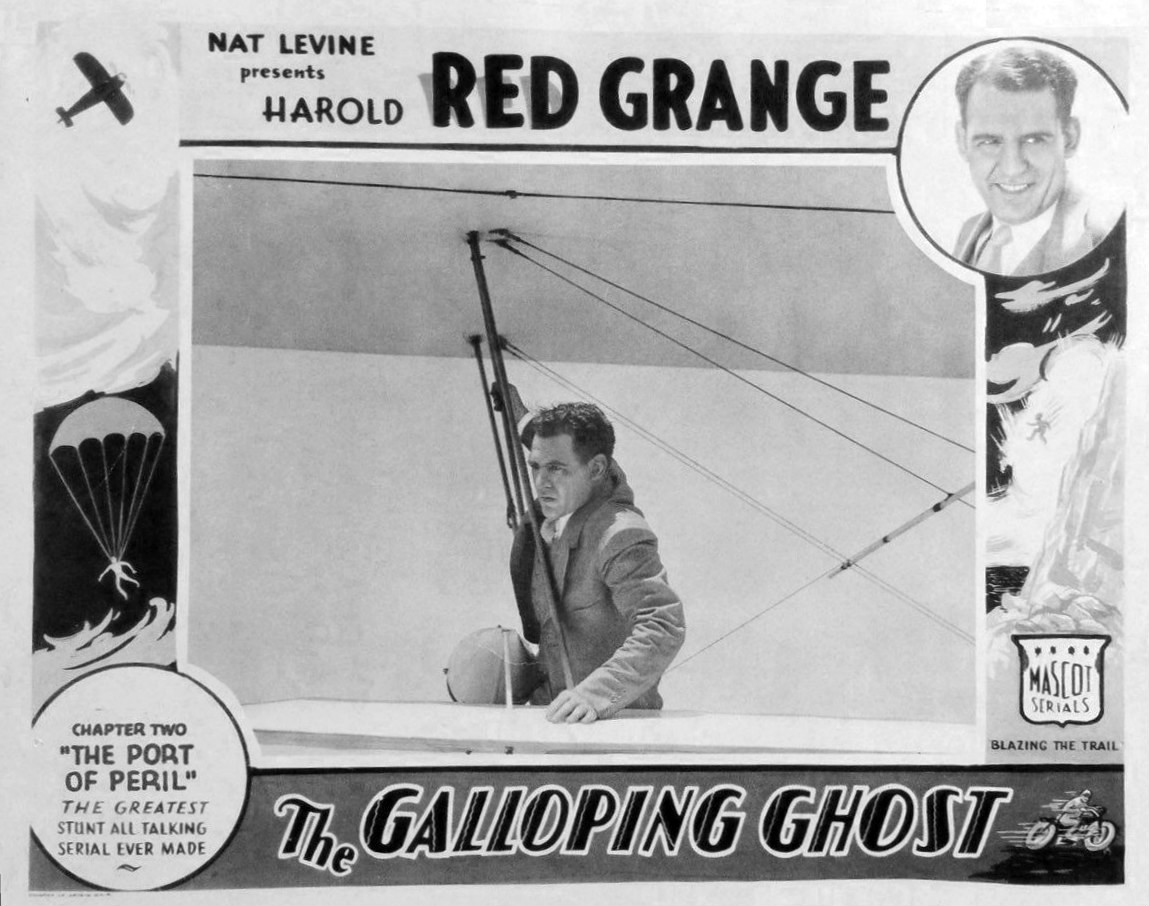
Lobby card for the second chapter of The Galloping Ghost

Pyle realized that as the greatest football star of his era, Grange could attract moviegoers, as well as sports fans. In 1926, he made his cinematic debut in the silent film One Minute to Play; Grange described the production process as "the worst drudgery I'd ever experienced". Due to California's summer heat and the story taking place in the Midwest during autumn, the studio struggled to find extras willing to dress in warmer clothing. As such, Pyle promoted the movie's climactic final game between the school of Grange's character Red Wade and that of the antagonist George Wilson, who had played against Grange on the barnstorming tour, as a genuine exhibition game with fans dressed in fall attire being granted free admission. The movie and Grange's performance received positive reviews, with one Chicago Tribune movie critic writing, "If you've never seen Red Grange play football, now's your chance, for he plays it like every thing in this picture."

Although The Minneapolis Star's Agnes Taafee criticized various scenes for their lack of realism, she praised Grange's performance. Film Booking Offices of America head Joseph P. Kennedy Sr. also asked Grange to consider retiring from football to enter acting full-time, but he declined.

The following year, he appeared in A Racing Romeo (1927), an auto racing-themed film. Grange had requested to perform his own racing stunts but Cliff Bergere was hired to take his place. The movie ultimately flopped at the box office, which Grange speculated was due to weaker promotion than with One Minute to Play. While sitting out the 1928 season to heal his knee injury, he and father Lyle joined Chicago film distributor Frank Zambreno on a nationwide vaudeville tour titled C'Mon Red.

Grange also starred in a 12-part serial series The Galloping Ghost in 1931. He performed his own stunts for the serial, including vehicular chases and fight scenes, in what he wrote was "The most strenuous work I have ever done in my life". With the rise of sound film, Grange struggled to adapt to having speaking roles.

In his autobiography, Grange wrote of his acting career: "I've always felt it represents one of the most memorable and worth-while chapters in my life. When I first reported for work in the film capital back in 1926, I was a shy, bashful, small-town boy despite the national prominence I had achieved for my football playing. Facing cameras, live audiences in the theaters, and mixing with all the stimulating people connected with show business did something for me. It gave me confidence and poise and made me feel a little bit more like a man of the world."

=== Filmography ===
Year	Title	Role	Notes
1926	One Minute to Play	Red Wade	
1927	A Racing Romeo	Red Wade	
1931	The Galloping Ghost	'Red' G	Serial, (final film role)

== Later life ==
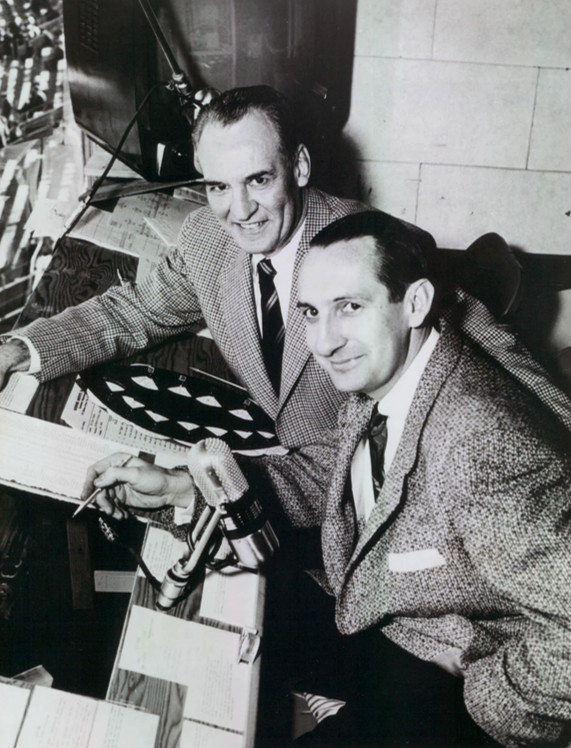
Grange (top) with broadcast partner Lindsey Nelson for NCAA Game of the Week coverage, 1955

Grange departed professional football in 1937 and earned a living in a variety of jobs including motivational speaker and sports announcer. In 1937 he was sued for damages by May Battaglia who claimed permanent injury after being struck by Grange who had run a red light. In the 1950s, he announced Bears games for CBS television and college football (including the Sugar Bowl) for NBC. In the early ‘20s Grange had a romantic relationship with Helen (Morrissey) Flozak. Grange met Helen at the Morrison Hotel in Chicago, Illinois where Helen worked as a “hat check girl”. The couple had one daughter, Rosemary Morrissey – born March 1, 1928. The couple never married. Grange married his wife Margaret, nicknamed Muggs, in 1941, and they were together until his death in 1991. She was a flight attendant, and they met on a plane. The couple had no children.

During the 1940s, he was an insurance broker in Chicago. In December 1944, he was voted president of the United States Football League, a newly formed "gridiron world series" with plans to begin the following year. However, he left his position in June 1945 and the league subsequently folded without playing a game after the NFL expanded into its targeted markets. Grange also led the National Girls Baseball League as its president from 1947 to his resignation in 1949.

In 1950, he was elected as a Republican to the Board of Trustees of the University of Illinois, on which he served from 1951 until 1955.

His autobiography, The Red Grange Story, was first published in 1953. The book was written "as told to" Ira Morton, a syndicated newspaper columnist from Chicago. Grange developed Parkinson's disease in his last year of life and died on January 28, 1991, in Lake Wales, Florida.

== Legacy ==
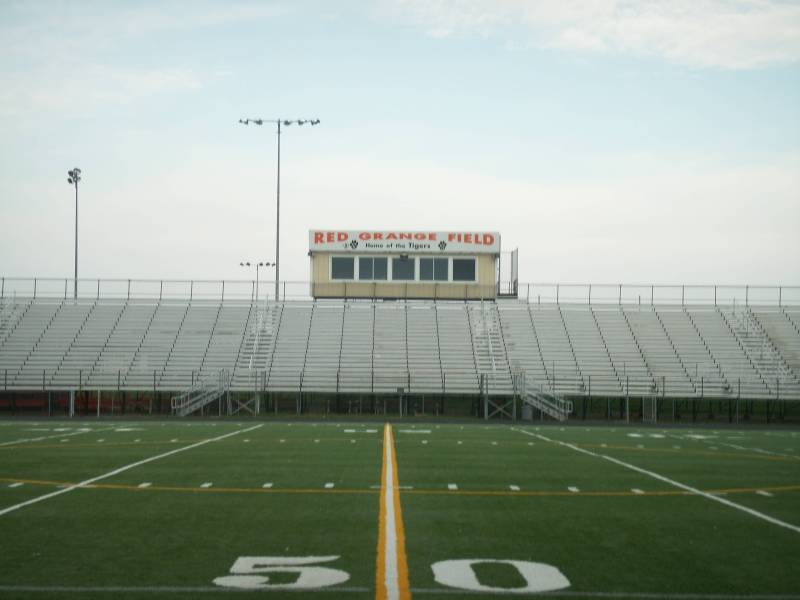
Red Grange Field at Wheaton Warrenville South High School, which was named in his honor

To commemorate college football's 100th anniversary in 1969, the Football Writers Association of America chose an all-time All-America team. Grange was the only unanimous choice. 30 years later in 1999, he was ranked number 80 on The Sporting News list of the 100 Greatest Football Players. In 2008, Grange was also ranked #1 on ESPN's Top 25 Players In College Football History list.

In honor of his achievements at the University of Illinois, the school erected a 12-ft statue of Grange at the start of the 2009 football season. In 2011, Grange was announced as number one on the "Big Ten Icons" series presented by the Big Ten Network.

In 1931, Grange visited Abington Senior High School in Abington, Pennsylvania, a suburb of Philadelphia. Shortly thereafter, the school adopted his nickname for the mascot in his honor, the Galloping Ghost.

Wheaton Warrenville South High School's football field is named in his honor and the team is referred to as the Wheaton Warrenville South Red Grange Tigers. Annually, the Wheaton Warrenville South Boys Track and Field team hosts the Red Grange Invitational in honor of Grange's achievements in track and field.

On January 15, 1978, at Super Bowl XII, Grange became the first person other than the game referee to toss the coin at a Super Bowl.

Every December, a junior college bowl game is held in his honor known as the Red Grange Bowl, in his home state of Illinois.

== See also ==
- List of unanimous college football All-Americans
- List of people on the cover of Time Magazine: 1920s
