= Haven-Villa of Winter Haven =

Professional American football team

General information
- Founded: 1926
- Folded: 1926
- Stadium: Winter Haven High School
- Headquartered: Traveling team
- Colors: Blue, White

Personnel
- Head coach: Bob Daley

Team history
- Haven-Villa of Winter Haven w/local players (Game 1); Haven-Villa of Winter Haven w/Cardinals players (Game 2); Haven-Villa of Winter Haven w/Big Blue players (Games 3-4); Eastern States All-Stars w/Big Blue players (Game 5)

League / conference affiliations
- Independent

The Haven-Villa of Winter Haven was a professional football team based in Winter Haven, Florida in 1926. While the team originated as a successful local team. However, the team was taken over by members of the Tampa Cardinals, featuring Jim Thorpe, and later the Millville Big Blue, a pro club from Millville, New Jersey, when the teams played a series of exhibition games in the winter of 1926.

== Cardinals ==
When Milleville first came to Florida, it had scheduled a game against Haven-Villa. However, the day of the game, Thorpe and several of the other Cardinals, fresh off of a loss against Red Grange and the Chicago Bears of the National Football League, showed up in the Haven-Villa line-up. The game resulted in a lopsided 28–6 victory for Millville. The win, however, proved costly, as Gyp Downey, the team's star kicker, suffered a fractured collar bone, ending his season. The Millville newspapers reported prior to the game that Red Grange would be officiating the game, however there were no reports of Grange doing so. Jim Thorpe also did not play in the game, probably due to his age and health issues, however several of his old teammates from the NFL did play. Those players include Pete Calac, Joe Little Twig and Rube Ursella.

== Big Blue ==
Shortly after the game it was announced that the Millville squad would, for the remainder of its stay in Florida, play under the Haven-Villa name. Art Bulger, a member of the old Haven-Villa lineup, was added to roster. Bob Daley took over as the team's manager. On January 11, the Haven-Villas headed to Palm Beach to square-off against a local club known as the Palm Beach Evergladers led by Jim Kendrick, a regular with the NFL's Buffalo All-Americans. Prior to the game, Palm Beach was reportedly undefeated in seven previous outings and touted as the Southern professional champions. However, Winter Haven still rolled to a 16–0 victory.

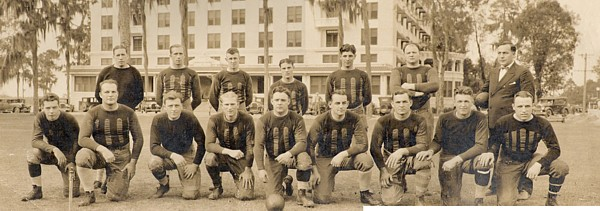
Haven-Villa of Winter Haven January 1926

Two days later the Villas were on the road for the first in a two-game series with the Tampa Cardinals, now called the St. Petersburg Cardinals. The team featured the same lineup as the “Tampa” Cardinals team that had originally been organized to play a New Years Day exhibition against Grange and the Bears. After a slow start both teams picked up the pace throughout the second half however those still the game ended a scoreless draw. The two teams faced each other again just a few days later, on the grounds of the high school at Winter Haven. Although the Cards, started strong, neither team managed to put any points on the board during the first two quarters. However, after in the third quarter, Ginny Gooch broke free on an end-around and quickly covered the sixty yards to the end-zone. That touchdown initiated a landslide of Haven-Villa scoring, as the team went on to a 38–0 win.

The very next day the two teams met for a third contest, this time at Adair Park. The Cardinals were now playing under the banner of "Lena Vista," while the Millville-Haven-Villa team was billed as the "Eastern States All-Stars." The game was not much different than the previous afternoon's game. The Cardinals were clearly overmatched, as the All-Stars ran up 24 unanswered points en route to their second shutout victory in as many days. Following the game, everyone agreed that, that a break was needed from football after a long season that began in September 1925. The decision was made to disband the team and head home. Most of the players caught the train back to Philadelphia the following evening, although a few extended their stay to pursue some real estate investment opportunities.

== Legacy ==
The Big Blue-Cardinals post-season swing through Florida had mixed results. The Big Blue certainly met with great success on the field, going 5-0-1 in postseason play under a variety of banners (two victories as Millville, a pair of victories and a tie as Haven-Villa, and another victory as the Eastern States All-Stars). However, there was a lack of fan interest, as the final games between the Cardinals and Big Blue drew small crowds of only a few hundred spectators.
