= Frankford Yellow Jackets =

American professional football team, part of the NFL from 1924–1931

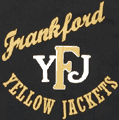
Logo

General information
- Founded: 1899
- Stadium: Frankford Stadium: Temporary stadiums in 1931 due to a fire at Frankford Stadium: Philadelphia Municipal Stadium (Two Games); Baker Bowl (two games)
- Headquartered: Frankford, Philadelphia, Pennsylvania, United States
- Colors: Blue, yellow, white

Personnel
- Owner: Frankford Athletic Association
- General manager: Shep Royle (1924–25, 1930–31); Theodore Holden (1926); James Adams (1927–30)
- Head coach: Punk Berryman (1924); Guy Chamberlin (1925–26); Charley Moran (1927); Swede Youngstrom (1927); Charley Rogers (1927); Russ Daugherty (1927); Ed Weir (1927–28); Bull Behman (1929–31)

Team history
- Frankford Athletic Association (1899–1909, 1912–1924); Loyola Athletic Club (1909–1912); Frankford Yellow Jackets (1924–1931)

League / conference affiliations
- Independent (1899–1923); National Football League (1924–1931)

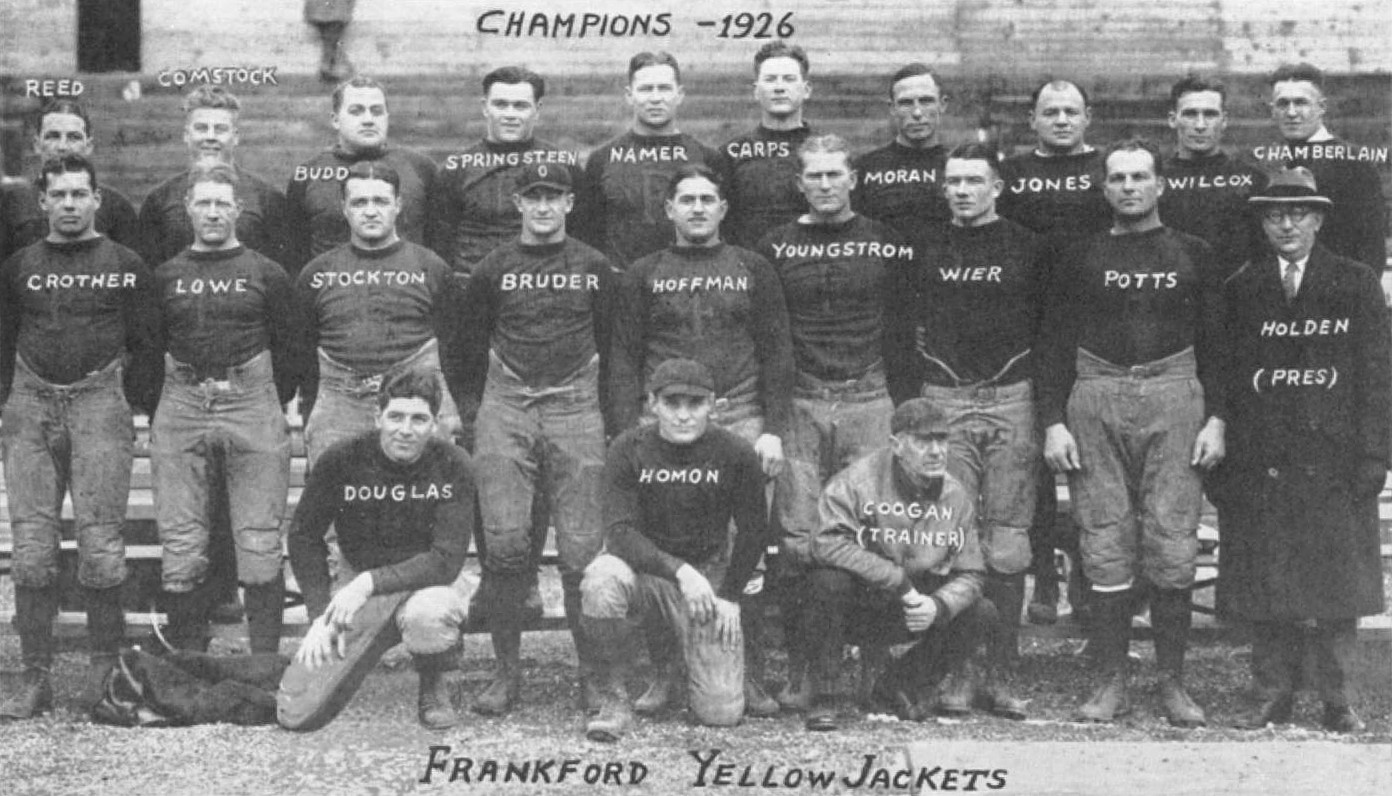
1926 championship team photo.

The Frankford Yellow Jackets (sometimes called Frankford Yellowjackets) were a professional American football team, part of the National Football League from 1924 to 1931, although its origin dates back to as early as 1899 with the Frankford Athletic Association. The Yellow Jackets won the NFL championship in 1926. The team played its home games from 1923 in Frankford Stadium (also called Yellow Jacket Field) in Frankford, Philadelphia, a neighborhood in the northeast of Philadelphia, noted for the Market–Frankford Line that terminates there.

== Founding ==
=== Frankford Athletic Association ===
The Frankford Athletic Association was organized in May 1899 in the parlor of the Suburban Club. The cost of purchasing a share in the association was $10. However, there were also contributing memberships, ranging from $1 to $2.50, made available to the general public. The Association was a community-based non-profit organization of local residents and businesses. In keeping with its charter, which stated that "all profits shall be donated to charity", all of the team's excess income was donated to local charitable institutions. The beneficiaries of this generosity included Frankford Hospital, the Frankford Day Nursery, the local Boy Scouts, and the local American Legion Post 211. The officers of the Association never received a salary or compensation for their work on behalf of the team.

The playing field, known as Wistar Field, became the first official home of the Yellow Jackets. Several years later, when the construction of the current high school was proposed, the team moved to Brown's Field. The Association initially fielded a baseball team; however, soccer and football clubs were also formed. The Association's football team played several games in 1899, including victorious contests against the Pioneer Athletic Association, Jefferson Medical College, the Philadelphia Athletic Club, and a team from Atlantic City.

The original Frankford Athletic Association disbanded before the 1909 football season. Several of the original players from the 1899 football team kept the team together, and they became known as Loyola Athletic Club. In keeping with Yellow Jackets tradition, they carried the "Frankford" name again in 1912, to become the Frankford Athletic Association.

== Yellow Jackets and the NFL ==
In the early 1920s, the Frankford Athletic Association's Yellow Jackets gained the reputation of being one of the best independent football teams in the nation. In 1922, Frankford absorbed the Philadelphia City Champion team, the Union Quakers of Philadelphia. That year Frankford captured the unofficial championship of Philadelphia. During the 1922 and 1923 seasons the Yellow Jackets compiled a 6–2–1 record against teams from the National Football League. This led to the Association being granted an NFL franchise in 1924.

=== 1924 season ===
The Yellow Jackets assembled in September 1924 under coach Punk Berryman to begin preparing for the upcoming season. The team included players Harry Dayhoff, Russ Stein, Bill Kellogg, Joe Spagna, Whitey Thomas, Al Bedner, and Bob Jamison. The team often played 15 to 20 games a season. Frequently, they would schedule two games on the same weekend, typically one at home on Saturday and, because of Pennsylvania's blue laws, an away game on Sunday. In their first game as a member of the NFL, the Yellow Jackets defeated the Rochester Jeffersons 21–0. Frankford finished the season with an overall record of 17–3–1, with an 11–2–1 record in league play. They finished third in league standings only behind the Cleveland Bulldogs and Chicago Bears; under modern standings tabulation procedures, Frankford would have finished in first place. In their 14 games, the Yellow Jackets also scored 38 rushing touchdowns during the 1924 season, an NFL record that stood for 98 years. The record was finally broken on January 29, 2023, by the same franchise that replaced them. The 2022 Philadelphia Eagles scored their 39th rushing touchdown in a single season (including the postseason) with four rushing touchdowns in the NFC Championship Game against the San Francisco 49ers. The Yellow Jackets did not have the benefit of postseason play in 1924, and that the Eagles required 19 games to break the record.

=== 1925 season ===
In 1925 the Frankford Athletic Association enlisted the services of Guy Chamberlin, who served as a player-coach for NFL championship teams such as the 1922 and 1923 Canton Bulldogs and the 1924 Cleveland Bulldogs. After a 9–1 start in league play, Frankford lost several key players, including Chamberlin, to injuries. After a 49–0 defeat to the Pottsville Maroons, Frankford's captain Bull Behman was suspended indefinitely from the team for indifferent play. He was accused of not giving his best during the past few weeks because of some dissension with other players. The move helped improve the team, which posted a 13–7 record in league play.

==== 1925 NFL Championship controversy ====
The Yellow Jackets had a part in the 1925 NFL Championship controversy. A dispute arose over a game that the nearby Pottsville Maroons had played against the Notre Dame All-Stars in Philadelphia; the Yellow Jackets asserted that their nearby rivals had infringed on their territorial rights by playing the game against a non-league opponent in Philadelphia. The league agreed and suspended the Maroons, allowing the Chicago Cardinals to win the 1925 title. However, the NFL reinstated the Maroons the following year after fears that the team would join Red Grange's upstart American Football League, which posed a threat to the league.

=== 1926 Championship season ===
The Yellow Jackets began the 1926 season with an exhibition game against the Atlantic City Roses, which Frankford won 45–0. Their NFL campaign started just six days later, in a disappointing 6–6 tie at home against the Akron Pros. The first weekend in October saw the club post two solid victories over the Hartford Blues. They then played a two-game series against the Buffalo Rangers. During the Saturday game, the Yellow Jackets defeated the Rangers 30–0 in Frankford. The Jackets then headed to Buffalo for the Sunday game; however, the Rangers canceled due to "wet grounds". The Yellow Jackets prepared for another two-game set, this time against the New York Giants, resulting in a pair of 6–0 Frankford victories. The Canton Bulldogs were next on the schedule; Frankford won the first game 10–0, while the second game was canceled due to rain.

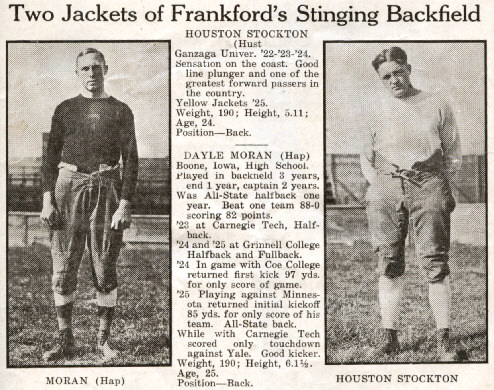
Stockton and Moran Yellow Jackets 1926

During the final weekend of October, the Yellow Jackets had a league-leading 6–0–1 record. However, they had an upcoming two-game set with their toughest opponent yet, the Providence Steam Rollers. The Yellow Jackets managed to split the series. The team's November schedule included only single-game weekends and a Thanksgiving Day game. This played to the Yellow Jackets’ advantage. The team posted victories over the Chicago Cardinals, Duluth Eskimos, and Dayton Triangles. This string of victories left Frankford in great shape in the standings as the team headed into its Thanksgiving Day game with the Green Bay Packers. For the next five seasons, the Frankford-Green Bay Thanksgiving Day game would become an annual tradition. Frankford went on to win the game 20–14, due mainly to a touchdown pass from Hust Stockton to Two-Bits Homan. The Yellow Jackets then posted a 7–6 victory over the Detroit Panthers two days later.

After a win over the Chicago Bears, the Yellow Jackets played a second two-game series against the Providence Steam Rollers. Frankford won the first game 24–0, but the second was canceled because of heavy snow. Frankford then had to play their final game of the season against the Pottsville Maroons, who were still upset after their NFL championship title had been stripped from them after complaints from Frankford. The game resulted in a scoreless tie. However, a 14–1–2 final record left the Yellow Jackets alone atop the NFL standings. Since a Championship Game would not exist in the NFL until 1933, the team with the best regular-season record was named the NFL Champion. This gave the Yellow Jackets undisputed claim to the league crown. The Jackets' 14 wins during the 1926 championship season set an NFL record for regular-season victories that stood until 1984 when it was broken by the 15–1–0 San Francisco 49ers.

One day after capturing the title, however, Theodore "Thee" Holden and Guy Chamberlin stepped down as president and coach of the Frankford Athletic Association.

=== 1927–1929 seasons ===
James Adams took over as president of the Frankford Athletic Association in 1927. He hired Charley Moran as the team's new coach. However, Moran's son Tom briefly served as the team's interim coach that year after Charley took a leave of absence to officiate in the 1927 World Series between the New York Yankees and the Pittsburgh Pirates. The Jackets suffered as a result of these changes and held a 2–5–1 record after eight league games. This led to Ed Weir becoming the team's player-coach. Weir had fellow players Russ Daugherty, Charlie Rogers, and Swede Youngstrom serve as assistant coaches. Under Weir's leadership, the team finished with a 6–9–3 record in 1927. The Jackets rebounded in 1928 with an 11–3–2 league record, behind only the Providence Steam Rollers. In 1929, Bull Behman became coach of the Yellow Jackets. The team finished with a 9–4–5 record for third place in league standings.

== Decline ==
=== 1930 season ===
The Yellow Jackets began to decline mainly because of financial hardships brought on by the Great Depression in 1930. Shep Royle, president of the Franklin Athletic Association, arranged for coaches Bull Behman and Wally Diehl to attend a coaching clinic in Chicago run by Glenn "Pop" Warner and Dick Hanley, in the hopes that it would improve their coaching techniques and develop a way to better utilize their players. At the same time, however, the Association's management decided to retain only a few veteran players, replacing most of the squad with rookies direct from college. This resulted in a string of ten consecutive losses (eight of which were in October), the worst losing streak in Yellow Jackets history. To end the streak, Frankford purchased eleven players from the Minneapolis Red Jackets, and George Gibson took over the team's coaching duties from Behman. The Legion Post also tried to rally to the Yellow Jackets, pledging its support. However, the effects of the economic depression and poor performance on the field combined to reduce the team's fan base. The season finally ended with a 6–13–1 overall record and a 4–13–1 record in league play.

=== Final season ===
Before the start of the 1931 season, Frankford Stadium was severely damaged by a fire, forcing the club to find another location for its home games. However, most facilities suitable for professional football were already booked. The Yellow Jackets had to overcome this scheduling problem by playing at two different locations around the city of Philadelphia: Philadelphia Municipal Stadium and Baker Bowl. Philadelphia Municipal Stadium and Baker Bowl were located outside of the Frankford area, making attendance difficult for local fans. The team had hoped to draw broader support from Philadelphia at large.

Herb Joesting took over as head coach in 1931. However, the team was in terrible shape. Some members of the press began referring to the team as the Philadelphia Yellow Jackets, in an attempt to increase fan support, which failed to materialize. By October, NFL President Joe Carr, after witnessing the poor attendance at Frankford's home loss to the Portsmouth Spartans, approved a plan for the Yellow Jackets to finish the season as a traveling team. Carr hoped that this move would allow the team to curb spending and rebound financially.

On October 26, 1931, the Yellow Jackets defeated the Chicago Bears, 13–12, at Wrigley Field. This game marked the last time a Philadelphia-based NFL team would win an away game over the Bears until October 17, 1999, when the Eagles defeated the Bears 20–16 at Soldier Field. The 1928 Yellow Jackets win over the Packers marked the last time in 51 years a Philadelphia NFL team won a road victory over the Packers; the Eagles' 1979 win at Green Bay finally ended that streak. Frankford's 71 wins are the most by any defunct NFL team.

== Legacy ==
The Frankford Athletic Association not only fielded the Yellow Jackets football team, but also the Yellow Jackets' Band and the Frankford Legion Post 211 Drum & Bugle Corps. The Association also sponsored bus and train trips for fans to travel along to games in such places as Pottsville and New York City, where even the host teams' sportswriters took notice of their enthusiasm. The club occasionally sponsored half-time exhibitions by the Frankford Midgets, as well as a women's football team. The latter is the first evidence of women playing organized football (in 1926).

During their time in the NFL, Frankford's Ignacio Molinet became the league's first Latino player.

Today the Philadelphia Fire Department's Engine 14, stationed in Frankford, have adopted the Yellow Jackets moniker on their fire trucks.

== Philadelphia Eagles ==
After two more games following the victory in Chicago, both shutout losses – indeed, the 1931 Yellow Jackets were shut out in every game besides the aforementioned victory – the Yellow Jackets suspended operations. Unable to find a buyer, the Frankford Athletic Association returned the franchise to the league.

The NFL spent over a year searching for a new team to operate in Philadelphia. On July 9, 1933, the NFL granted an expansion franchise to Bert Bell and Lud Wray and awarded them the assets of the failed Yellow Jackets organization, with Bell and Wray naming their team the Eagles after the symbol of Franklin Roosevelt's New Deal. This has led to assumptions that the Yellow Jackets sat out the 1932 season before returning to the league as the Eagles. However, that is not the case. Bell and Wray did not buy the Yellow Jackets team (though they acquired the Yellow Jackets' assets), but rather the NFL rights to the Philadelphia area that had formerly belonged to the Frankford Athletic Association. In view of the period of dormancy, the Eagles do not claim the Yellow Jackets' history as their own, while the NFL considers the Eagles as a 1933 expansion team for record-keeping purposes. Additionally, Bell and Wray assembled an almost entirely new team; Art Koeninger was the only player from the 1931 Yellow Jackets on the roster of the 1933 Eagles.

Despite this, in the first few years of the Eagles' existence, they wore powder blue and yellow uniforms similar to those worn by the Yellow Jackets; these are also the colors of Philadelphia's flag. Replicas were later worn as 1934 throwbacks in a game against the Detroit Lions on September 23, 2007, as part of the team's 75th anniversary season.

== Hall of Famers ==
Frankford Yellow Jackets Hall of Famers
Players
No.	Name	Position	Tenure	Inducted
—	Guy Chamberlin	End/HB; Coach	1925–1926	1965
—	William "Link" Lyman	T	1925	1964

== Other notable players ==
- Nate Barragar
- Bull Behman
- Jug Earp
- Two-Bits Homan
- Herb Joesting
- Mort Kaer
- Bill Kelly
- Joseph Lightner
- Hap Moran
- Ray Richards
- Herb Stein
- Hust Stockton
- George Sullivan
- Charley "Pie" Way
- Ed Weir

== Season-by-season record ==
(Record of NFL play only)

Year	W	L	T	Finish	Coach
1924	11	2	1	3rd	Punk Berryman
1925	13	7	0	6th	Guy Chamberlin
1926	14	1	1	1st	Guy Chamberlin
1927	6	9	3	7th	Charley Moran (2–5–1); Swede Youngstrom/Charley Rogers/Russ Daugherty/Ed Weir (4–4–2)
1928	11	3	2	2nd	Ed Weir
1929	10	4	5	3rd	Bull Behman
1930	4	13	1	9th	Bull Behman (2–10–1); George Gibson (2–3)
1931	1	6	1	10th	Bull Behman

Achievements
Preceded by Chicago Cardinals; 1925	NFL Champions; Frankford Yellow Jackets; 1926	Succeeded by New York Giants; 1927
