= Tampa Cardinals =

Barnstorming football team

General information
- Founded: 1926
- Folded: 1926
- Stadium: Plant Field
- Headquartered: Barnstorming
- Colors: Cardinal red, White,

Personnel
- Owner: Jim Thorpe
- General manager: Jim Thorpe
- Head coach: Jim Thorpe

Team history
- Tampa Cardinals (game 1); Haven-Villas (game 2); St. Petersburg Cardinals (game 3–5); Lena Vistas (6)

League / conference affiliations
- Independent

The Tampa Cardinals were a barnstorming football team, that played pick-up games, led by future Pro Football Hall of Famer, Jim Thorpe in 1926. During the time, the team was also billed as the St. Petersburg Cardinals and as Lena Vistas. The team was originally organized to play a New Year's Day exhibition against the Chicago Bears of the National Football League in what would be Tampa’s first professional football game. However, the team would later pick up four other games while in Florida. The team has also been referred to as Thorpe's Cardinals.

== 1926 season ==
January 1, 1926: Game program from the first pro football game in Tampa. Tampa Cardinals vs. Chicago Bears

After the 1925 season, Thorpe formed a team, composed primarily of his teammates from the NFL’s Rock Island Independents, to play several games throughout Florida. In a 1926 New Year's Day football exhibition, the Tampa Cardinals played against the Chicago Bears led by Red Grange. The game itself was billed as a clash of old vs. new, with Grange, the rising star, taking on Thorpe, the aging legend. During the game Grange rushed for a 70-yard touchdown, as the Bears notched a 17–3 victory at Plant Field.

After the game Thorpe and the core of his Cardinals team remained in Florida to play a few barnstorming games under various other names. The Cardinals were hired to supplement the line-up of the Haven-Villa of Winter Haven, a local club playing out of Winter Haven. The Villas were set to square off on January 7 against the Millville Big Blue, a successful independent club from New Jersey that was headed up by Guy Chamberlin. Chamberlin was a friend and former teammate of Thorpe during their time with the Canton Bulldogs. Despite being scheduled to appear, Thorpe did not take the field during the game. The exact reason for his absence is not clear. The Cardinals/Haven-Villa lost the game, 28–7.

A rematch against Millville was soon scheduled. For this game the Cardinals headed to St. Petersburg, Florida where they were billed as the St. Petersburg Cardinals. However, this time the Millville team had been hired to represent Haven-Villa. The game was held at the St. Petersburg Kennel Club on January 14 in order to accommodate an anticipated large crowd; however, the game drew just 300 fans. This time the Cardinals held Millville/Haven-Villa to a scoreless tie.

On January 16, the team's fourth game was a 3–0 win over a Sarasota team of collegians constructed by former Florida Gator Robbie Robinson. Thorpe provided the only score on a 40-yard drop kick field goal. Another match-up against Millville/Haven Villa was arranged for January 20 in Winter Haven to be played at the local high school stadium. In front of just 500 spectators, the Cardinals lost, 38–0.

A fourth game between the two clubs was played the next day at Adair Park in Lakeland, the Cardinals' final game in Florida. Thorpe's team took to the field under the banner of the Lena Vistas, while Chamberlin's team was billed as the Eastern States All-Stars. The Cardinals lost yet again, 240, to Millville. The team then ended its season due a lack of interest that led to a disappointing fan turnout. The team finished its tour of Florida with a 1–4–1 record.
