= Asian Americans in sports =

Asian Americans have participated in all major American sports, including as athletes, managers, and coaches.

Asian Americans have appeared in all major sports in the United States, including the NFL, Olympic sports, the PGA Tour, the NBA, MLB, MLS, and other global sports organizations. In the 1947–48 season, Wataru Misaka broke the color barrier of the Basketball Association of America, the precursor to the NBA, and in 1948 divers Vicki Manalo Draves and Sammy Lee became the first Asian Americans to win Olympic gold medals. Many Asian-American athletes have since reached the top level of their respective sports, including Tommy Kono, Michael Chang, Kristi Yamaguchi, Michelle Kwan, Tiger Woods, Apolo Ohno, Hines Ward, Jeremy Lin, Chloe Kim, Suni Lee, Nathan Chen, and Alysa Liu. Dave Roberts became the first Asian-American manager to win a World Series in 2020, and Erik Spoelstra coached the Miami Heat to consecutive NBA championships.

Although Asian Americans did not face formal discrimination to the same degree as African Americans, stereotyping and other informal discrimination has affected Asian American participation in sports. Asian athletes remain largely underrepresented in American sports.

== Baseball ==
Bobby Balcena was a Filipino American athlete from San Pedro, CA. He had a 15-year career in the minor leagues from 1948 to 1963. He played outfield with the Wichita Indians, San Antonio Missions, Kansas City Blues, Buffalo Bisons, Dallas Rangers, Vancouver Mounties, Hawaii Islanders, Toronto Maple Leafs and Seattle Rainiers. In 1956, Bobby Balcena became the first Asian American to play in Major League Baseball, playing seven games for the Cincinnati Redlegs. He died in 1990 and until then had been the only Filipino American to play in Major League Baseball.

Japanese American Kurt Suzuki played for six Major League Baseball franchises over his 15 year career. Other current Major League Baseball players with Asian American backgrounds include: Keston Hiura, Jordan Yamamoto, Connor Joe, Rob Refsnyder, Steven Kwan, and Bryan Woo. Don Wakamatsu, who played 18 games for the Chicago White Sox in 1991, became the first Major League manager of Asian descent when he was named manager of the Seattle Mariners in 2008. In 2020, Los Angeles Dodgers manager Dave Roberts became the first Asian-American manager to win a World Series.

== Basketball ==
Wataru Misaka broke the BAA (the precursor to the NBA) color barrier when he played for the New York Knicks in the 1947–48 season. Prior to his brief professional career, Misaka helped lead the Utah Utes to victories in the 1944 NCAA and 1947 NIT championships.

Another prominent Asian American NBA player was Raymond Townsend. Townsend played for the Golden State Warriors and Indiana Pacers from 1978 to 1982. Rex Walters played from 1993 to 2000 with the Nets, Philadelphia 76ers and Miami Heat; he was the head coach for the University of San Francisco basketball team.

After playing basketball at Harvard University, point guard Jeremy Lin signed with the NBA's Golden State Warriors in 2010 and won an NBA Championship with the Toronto Raptors in the 2018-2019 NBA season. Lin also played in the NBA G League with the Santa Cruz Warriors, before signing with the Beijing Ducks in 2021.

During his time with the Knicks, Lin had an exceptional stretch of play popularly dubbed "Linsanity". While prominent Knicks players including Carmelo Anthony and Amar'e Stoudemire were temporarily out due to injuries and personal issues, Lin led the Knicks on a 9-3 stretch while averaging 22.5 points and 8.7 assists per game.

However, Lin also faced racist remarks by media during this time. Jason Whitlock, a Fox Sports columnist, tweeted, "Some lucky lady in NYC is gonna feel a couple inches of pain tonight," referencing a stereotype that Asian men have small penises. Whitlock later apologized for the remark.

Later, after a loss to the Charlotte Hornets where Lin posted nine turnovers, ESPN published an article titled "Chink in the Armor," with other references containing the slur occurring in other ESPN media. The article was quickly withdrawn and the writer responsible was fired; Lin, when asked for a comment, said, "“I don’t think it was on purpose. At the same time, they’ve apologized. I don’t care anymore.”

Jordan Clarkson of the New York Knicks is also of partial Filipino-American descent.

Current Kansas Jayhawks assistant coach Kurtis Townsend is Raymond Townsend's brother.

Erik Spoelstra, whose mother is Filipino, became the youngest coach ever in NBA history. He is currently the head coach of the Miami Heat.

Bobby Webster, whose mother is Japanese American, is currently serving as general manager for the Toronto Raptors of the NBA

Unlike baseball, which was introduced to Japan by the United States in 1873 and played predominantly by the immigrant Issei, basketball in the Japanese American community gained popularity as a sport primarily embraced by the Nisei, the second-generation Japanese Americans. It became a true Japanese American phenomenon during the 1920s, as recreational teams formed wherever there were significant numbers of young Japanese American men, particularly in California regions like the San Francisco Bay Area, Sacramento, the Central Valley, and Los Angeles.

Basketball teams were often organized and sponsored by local YMCAs (Young Men’s Christian Associations), YMBAs (Young Men’s Buddhist Associations), and private Japanese American social clubs. In 1933, the Japanese Amateur Athletic Union (JAAU) in both Northern and Southern California began sponsoring basketball, organizing formal leagues for the top-rated teams. Local ethnic presses played a pivotal role in promoting these leagues by publishing schedules, scores, and stories, helping to bridge urban and rural Japanese American communities.

The leagues thrived until 1941, when Executive Order 9066 led to the wartime incarceration of over 110,000 Japanese Americans, abruptly ending all organized basketball play. However, basketball remained popular in the internment camps, offering a sense of normalcy and community during a time of great upheaval.

After the war, Japanese Americans returned to the West Coast, where basketball continued to serve as a key element of community life. The Nisei Athletic Union (NAU), founded by figures like Akira Komai and Min Sano, quickly succeeded the JAAU and revitalized league play in both Northern and Southern California. Leagues continued to expand in the post-war years, with various levels of competition ('AA', 'A', and 'B' levels) to accommodate teams of different skill levels.

== Multisport Athletes ==
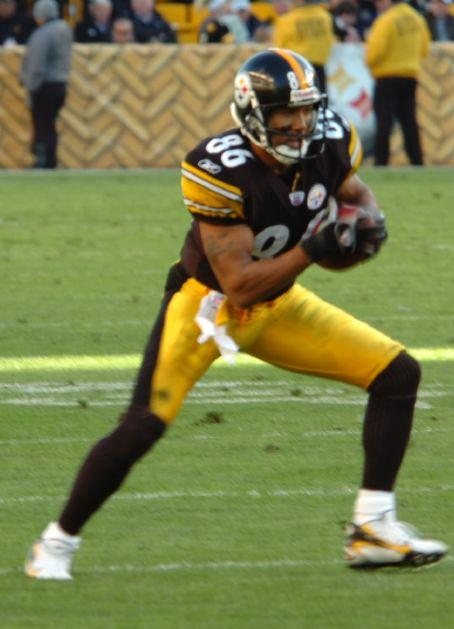
Hines Ward-Pittsburgh Steelers

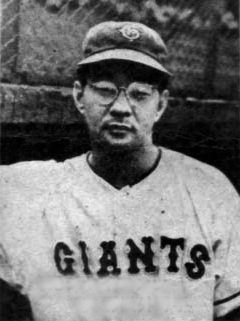
Wally Yonamine in 1951

Wally Yonamine played professionally in the NFL for a single season with the San Francisco 49ers in 1947. In his one season with the team, he had 19 carries for 74 yards and caught 3 passes for 40 yards. After his brief career in the NFL Yonamine traveled overseas to play baseball. In 1951, he became the first American to play professional baseball in Japan, leading off for the Yomiuri Giants.

Hines Ward, who was of Korean descent, played both football and baseball. Prior to playing wide receiver at the University of Georgia, Ward was drafted by the Miami Marlins and offered a $25,000 signing bonus. He was drafted 92nd overall in the NFL draft by the Pittsburgh Steelers and played all 14 seasons for the organization. Ward was also notable for his speaking out against discrimination issues that were occurring in his birthplace of South Korea.

Walter "Sneeze" Achiu was the first person of east Asian descent to play in the National Football League. At the University of Dayton, he was a three-sport athlete participating in football, baseball, and track. Walter Achiu was inducted into the University of Dayton Hall of Fame in 1974. After his time in the NFL, Achiu went on to become a professional wrestling champion when he competed in the 1950s.

== Football ==
In the 1920s, Arthur Matsu, a Japanese-Scottish quarterback, starred at The College of William & Mary, captaining the team and receiving national acclaim for his athleticism as a "triple-threat man" skilled at running, passing, and punting. In addition, Walter "Sneeze" Achiu, a Chinese-Hawaiian halfback, earned 1925 All-American honors at the University of Dayton. Matsu and Achiu would go on to play together for the NFL's Dayton Triangles in 1928, becoming the first Asian-Americans to play in the NFL.

In 1962, half-Filipino Roman Gabriel, a two-time all-American quarterback at NC State, was selected with both the second overall pick in the 1962 NFL draft by the Los Angeles Rams and the first overall pick in the same year's AFL draft by the Oakland Raiders. Gabriel went on to play 16 seasons for the Rams and Philadelphia Eagles, including an NFL MVP-winning season in 1969.

In 1986, John Lee, a Korean-born placekicker, was drafted by the then-St. Louis Cardinals in the 2nd round of the NFL Draft after earning back-to-back first-team All-American honors for UCLA, becoming the first Korean to play in the NFL.

In 1992, Korean-American Eugene Chung, an All-American offensive tackle at Virginia Tech, was drafted by the New England Patriots in the first round of the NFL Draft. Chung played five seasons for the Patriots and also appeared for the Jacksonville Jaguars and Indianapolis Colts before retiring.

In 1998, Vietnamese-American Dat Nguyen, a senior middle linebacker for the Texas A&M Aggies, earned unanimous All-American honors and won both the Bednarik Award, awarded to the top defensive player in college football, and the Lombardi Award. Nguyen was the Aggies' leading tackler in each of his four seasons, and still holds the school record with 517 career tackles. Nguyen was drafted by the Dallas Cowboys (becoming the first Vietnamese-American to be drafted) and played seven seasons, earning second-team All-Pro honors in 2003.

Hines Ward, a Korean-American born in Seoul, South Korea and raised in the Atlanta area, played wide receiver for the Georgia Bulldogs before being drafted by the Pittsburgh Steelers in 1998. Ward caught 1,000 career passes for 12,083 yards over 14 seasons with the Steelers, winning both Super Bowl XL and Super Bowl XLIII. He is best remembered for his performance in Super Bowl XL, when he caught 5 passes for 123 yards and a touchdown to earn Super Bowl MVP honors.

Two former standout defensive players for the Bill Belichick-era New England Patriots are of partial Asian descent. Linebacker Tedy Bruschi, who played for the Patriots from 1996 to 2008 – winning three Super Bowls and making two All-Pro teams – is half-Filipino, while safety Patrick Chung, who is Chinese-Jamaican, was also a three-time Super Bowl champion in 10 seasons with New England between 2009 and 2019.

In 2010, Ed Wang, an offensive tackle at Virginia Tech, was selected by the Buffalo Bills in the 5th round of the NFL Draft, becoming the first full-blooded Chinese player be drafted and play in the NFL.

Younghoe Koo, a Korean-born kicker, was selected to the Pro Bowl in 2020 after leading the NFL in scoring for the Atlanta Falcons. Koo also gained attention after successfully converting three onside kicks in a single game in 2019.

In 2018, quarterback Kyler Murray, who is of partial Korean descent, won the Heisman Trophy while leading Oklahoma to a 12-2 record, a Big 12 conference title, and the College Football Playoff. Murray was selected with the 1st overall pick of the 2019 NFL draft by the Arizona Cardinals, going on to win the 2019 AP Offensive Rookie of the Year award, make the Pro Bowl twice, and lead the Cardinals to the playoffs once.

Five years later, quarterback Jayden Daniels, who is of partial Japanese descent, won the 2023 Heisman Trophy while playing for LSU. He was selected second overall by the Washington Commanders in the 2024 NFL draft. Daniels won the 2024 Offensive Rookie of the Year award and began wearing a Japanese flag on his helmet during the 2025 season.

Other current NFL players with Asian ancestry include Korean-American safety Kyle Hamilton, a two-time All-Pro; Chinese-American safety Taylor Rapp, who won Super Bowl LVI with the Rams; Filipino-American safety Cam Bynum, and Filipino American wide receiver Andrei Iosivas.

Norm Chow, who is Chinese-Hawaiian, was a longtime college offensive assistant well-known for developing quarterbacks. Chow won the 2002 Broyles Award (given to the top assistant coach in college football) as USC's offensive coordinator. That season, USC quarterback Carson Palmer won the Heisman Trophy and became the first overall pick in the 2003 NFL Draft. In addition to Palmer, Chow also developed fellow USC Heisman winner Matt Leinart; BYU quarterbacks Jim McMahon, Steve Young, and Heisman winner Ty Detmer while serving as BYU's offensive playcaller; and Philip Rivers while serving as NC State offensive coordinator. Chow also served as Hawaii head coach from 2012 to 2015, Tennessee Titans offensive coordinator from 2005 to 2007, and UCLA offensive coordinator from 2008 and 2010.

In 2021, Marcus Freeman, a Korean-American former linebacker who played for Ohio State and the Chicago Bears, was promoted from Notre Dame defensive coordinator to head coach. Freeman led the Fighting Irish to a 43-11 total record in his first four seasons as head coach. In 2024, Freeman won the Bear Bryant Coach of the Year Award for leading Notre Dame to the CFP National Championship game, where they lost to Ohio State to finish as national runner-up. Freeman is the first Asian-American and African-American coach to reach the Division 1 national championship game.

== Mixed martial arts ==
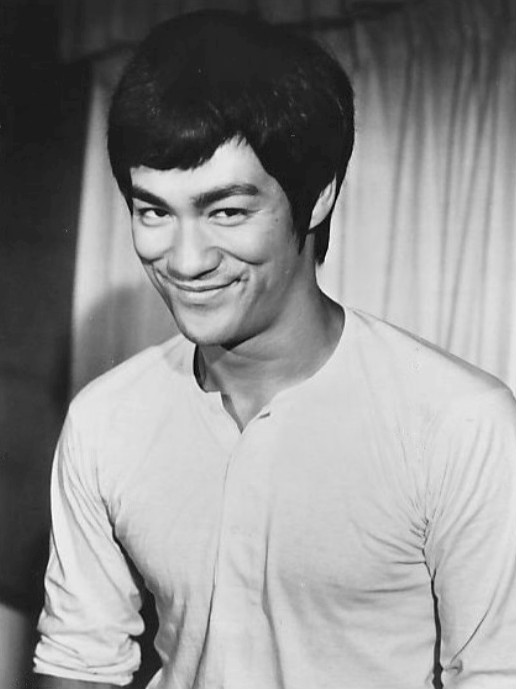
Bruce Lee in 1971

In 2004, UFC President Dana White called Bruce Lee, who was born in San Francisco, the "father of mixed martial arts".

There are several top ranked Asian American mixed martial artists. B.J. Penn is a former UFC lightweight and welterweight champion. Cung Le is a former Strikeforce middleweight champion. Benson Henderson is the former WEC lightweight champion and a former UFC lightweight champion. Nam Phan is a UFC featherweight fighter.

== Olympics ==
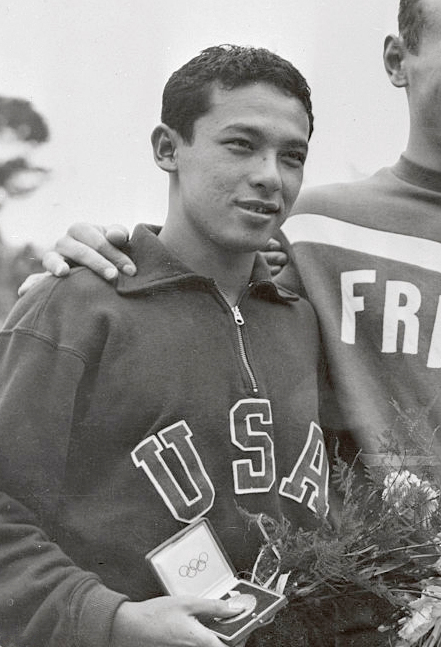
Ford Konno at the 1952 Olympics

Asian Americans first made an impact in Olympic sports in the late 1940s and in the 1950s. Victoria Manalo Draves won both gold in platform and springboard diving in the 1948 Olympics, becoming the first Asian American to earn a gold medal. Sammy Lee became the first Asian American man to earn an Olympic Gold Medal (two days after Draves), winning in platform diving in both 1948 and 1952. Harold Sakata won a weightlifting silver medal in the 1948 Olympics, while Tommy Kono (weightlifting), Yoshinobu Oyakawa (100-meter backstroke) and Ford Konno (1500-meter freestyle) each won gold and set Olympic records in the 1952 Olympics. Konno won another gold and silver swimming medal at the same Olympics and added a silver medal in 1956, while Kono set another Olympic weightlifting record in 1956. Also at the 1952 Olympics, Evelyn Kawamoto won two bronze medals in swimming.

Eric Sato won gold (1988) and bronze (1992) medals in volleyball, while his sister Liane Sato won bronze in the same sport in 1992. Brothers Kawika and Erik Shoji won bronze medals in volleyball in 2016.

Amy Chow was a member of the gold medal women's gymnastics team at the 1996 Olympics; she also won an individual silver medal on the uneven bars. Gymnast Mohini Bhardwaj won a team silver medal in the 2004 Olympics. Bryan Clay who is of half Japanese descent won the decathlon gold medal in the 2008 Olympics, the silver medal in the 2004 Olympics, and was the sport's 2005 world champion.

Since Tiffany Chin won the women's US Figure Skating Championship in 1985, Asian Americans have been prominent in that sport. Kristi Yamaguchi won three national championships, two world titles, and the 1992 Olympic gold medal. Michelle Kwan has won nine national championships and five world titles, as well as two Olympic medals (silver in 1998, bronze in 2002). At the 2018 Winter Olympics, Mirai Nagasu became the first American woman to land the triple axel in Olympic competition. Nathan Chen won a gold medal in the men's figure skating singles competition at the 2022 Winter Olympics.

Apolo Ohno, who is of half Japanese descent, is a short track speed skater and an eight-time Olympic medalist as well as the most decorated American Winter Olympic athlete of all time. He became the youngest U.S. national champion in 1997 and was the reigning champion from 2001 to 2009, winning the title a total of 12 times. In 1999, he became the youngest skater to win a World Cup event title, and became the first American to win a World Cup overall title in 2001, which he won again in 2003 and 2005. He won his first overall World Championship title at the 2008 championships.

Chloe Kim won gold medals in snowboarding at the 2018 and 2022 Winter Olympics.

Nathan Adrian, who is a hapa of half Chinese descent, is a professional American swimmer and three-time Olympic gold medalist who currently holds the American record in the 50 and 100-yard freestyle (short course) events. He has won a total of fifteen medals in major international competitions, twelve gold, two silver, and one bronze spanning the Olympics, the World, and the Pan Pacific Championships.

Hmong American Sunisa Lee won the 2020 Olympics all-around gymnastics gold medal during the Tokyo Olympics.

Alysa Liu, who was raised by her Chinese-American immigrant father, won the Olympics single figure skating gold medal during the 2026 Winter Olympics.

=== List of medalists ===
Sport	Athlete
Artistic swimming	Audrey Kwon; Jacklyn Luu; Megumi Field
Athletics	Bryan Clay; Michael Norman
Cycling	Alexi Grewal
Diving	Vicki Draves; Sammy Lee
Fencing	Emily Cross; Lee Kiefer; Alexander Massialas; Peter Westbrook
Figure skating	Nathan Chen; Madison Chock; Ellie Kam; Michelle Kwan; Alysa Liu; Ilia Malinin; Mirai Nagasu; Alex Shibutani; Maia Shibutani; Kristi Yamaguchi
Football	Natasha Kai
Freestyle skiing	Toby Dawson
Gymnastics	Mohini Bhardwaj; Raj Bhavsar; Amy Chow; Asher Hong; Sunisa Lee; Kyla Ross; Kevin Tan
Ice hockey	Julie Chu
Nordic combined	Bill Demong
Short track speed skating	J. R. Celski; Simon Cho; Apolo Ohno
Snowboarding	Chloe Kim
Swimming	Nathan Adrian; Natalie Coughlin; Catherine Fox; Torri Huske; Evelyn Kawamoto; Ford Konno; Jay Litherland; Yoshi Oyakawa; Erica Sullivan
Taekwondo	Paige McPherson
Tennis	Rajeev Ram
Volleyball	Eric Sato; Liane Sato; Erik Shoji; Kawika Shoji; Justine Wong-Orantes
Weightlifting	Harold Sakata; Tommy Kono
Wrestling	Clarissa Chun

== Other sports ==
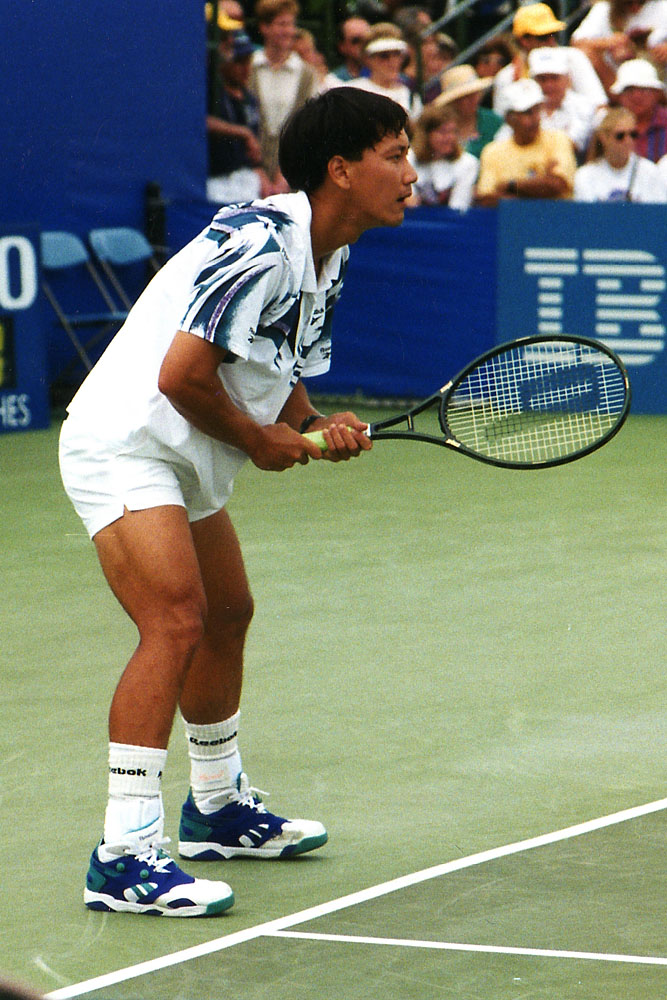
Michael Chang in 1994

In long-distance running, Miki Gorman won the Boston and New York City marathons twice in the 1970s. A former American record holder at the distance, she is the only woman to win both races twice, and is one of only two women to win both marathons in the same year.

Tiger Woods, an Afro-Asian, is the most successful golfer of his generation and one of the most famous athletes in the world. In 1997, at the age of 21, he became the youngest and the first African American to win the U.S. Masters. Woods made his first appearance in the British Open later that year and tied the course record of 64. He won another 13 majors and was named the PGA Player of the Year 10 times over the next 12 years. His most recent major victory was at the 2019 US Masters after many doubted his return. Later that year, Woods won the Zozo Championship to tie Sam Snead's PGA Tour record of 82 victories. Tiger Woods has gained more than $118 million in career earnings and having an estimated net worth of $800 million.

Collin Morikawa, who is of Chinese and Japanese descent, won the 2020 PGA Championship and the 2021 British Open. He also appeared as a member of the United States national team in the 2021 and 2023 Ryder Cups and 2022 and 2024 Presidents Cups.

Eric Koston is one of the top street skateboarders and placed first in the 2003 X-Games street competition. Richard Park is a Korean American ice hockey player who currently plays for the Swiss team HC Ambri-Piotta.

Brian Ching, whose father was Chinese, represented the United States Men's National Soccer Team, scoring 11 goals in 45 caps. He participated in the 2006 World Cup and won the 2007 Gold Cup.

Kyle Larson became the first driver of Asian descent to win in the NASCAR Cup Series in 2016. He was also the first Asian to win a NASCAR touring series championship, winning the 2012 NASCAR K&N Pro Series East title.

Jeanette Lee, a professional pool player born to Korean parents, received numerous accolades throughout her career, including the 1998 Women's Professional Billiard Association (WPBA) Sportsperson of the Year Award. She won a gold medal for the United States in women's 9-ball at the 2001 Akita World Games.

Cricket's presence in the United States, manifested at the highest level by Major League Cricket, has mainly been driven by immigration from Commonwealth countries, with the Asian component of that mainly coming from South Asia. Team USA, comprising mainly South Asian Americans, pulled off an upset against Pakistan during the 2024 Men's T20 World Cup.

=== Hockey ===
Current National Hockey League players with Asian American backgrounds include: Kailer Yamamoto, brothers Kiefer and Kole Sherwood, and brothers Jason and Nick Robertson.

Julie Chu, who is three-quarters Chinese and one-quarter Puerto Rican, is an American Olympic ice hockey player who played for the United States women's ice hockey team. She was also the US Olympic Team Flag Bearer for the 2014 Winter Olympic closing ceremonies.

=== Tennis ===
In 1973, Ann Kiyomura won the Wimbledon junior singles title. In 1975, she won the Wimbledon women's doubles title.

Michael Chang was a top-ranked tennis player for most of his career. He was seen as an underdog standing at 5'9 and weighing only 150 pounds. He was the youngest tennis player to be ranked among the five best players in the world. Chang was fifteen years old when he went from juniors to professional. He became the youngest to win a match at the U.S. Open and go to the semifinals. He went pro in 1988 and in 1989, at the age of seventeen, he became the youngest player ever to win the French Open, and the first American to win the event since 1955. Chang gained an estimated $18 million from tournament winnings excluding product endorsements.

Jessica Pegula, the daughter of Kim Pegula, the Korean-born co-owner of the Buffalo Bills and Buffalo Sabres, was a finalist in the 2024 US Open and has been ranked as high as No. 3 in the WTA rankings. Pegula is also an accomplished doubles player, reaching the 2022 French Open final with fellow American Coco Gauff. She was ranked the number one doubles player by the WTA as recently as September 2023.

== See also ==
- List of Asian Americans: Sports
- National Asian Pacific Americans in Sports Day (https://www.nationaldayarchives.com/day/national-asian-pacific-americans-in-sports-day/)

=== By group ===
- East Asian Americans:
  - Japanese Americans#Sports
- South Asian Americans#Sports
- Southeast Asian Americans:
  - Filipino Americans and sports
