= List of Dayton Flyers men's basketball head coaches =

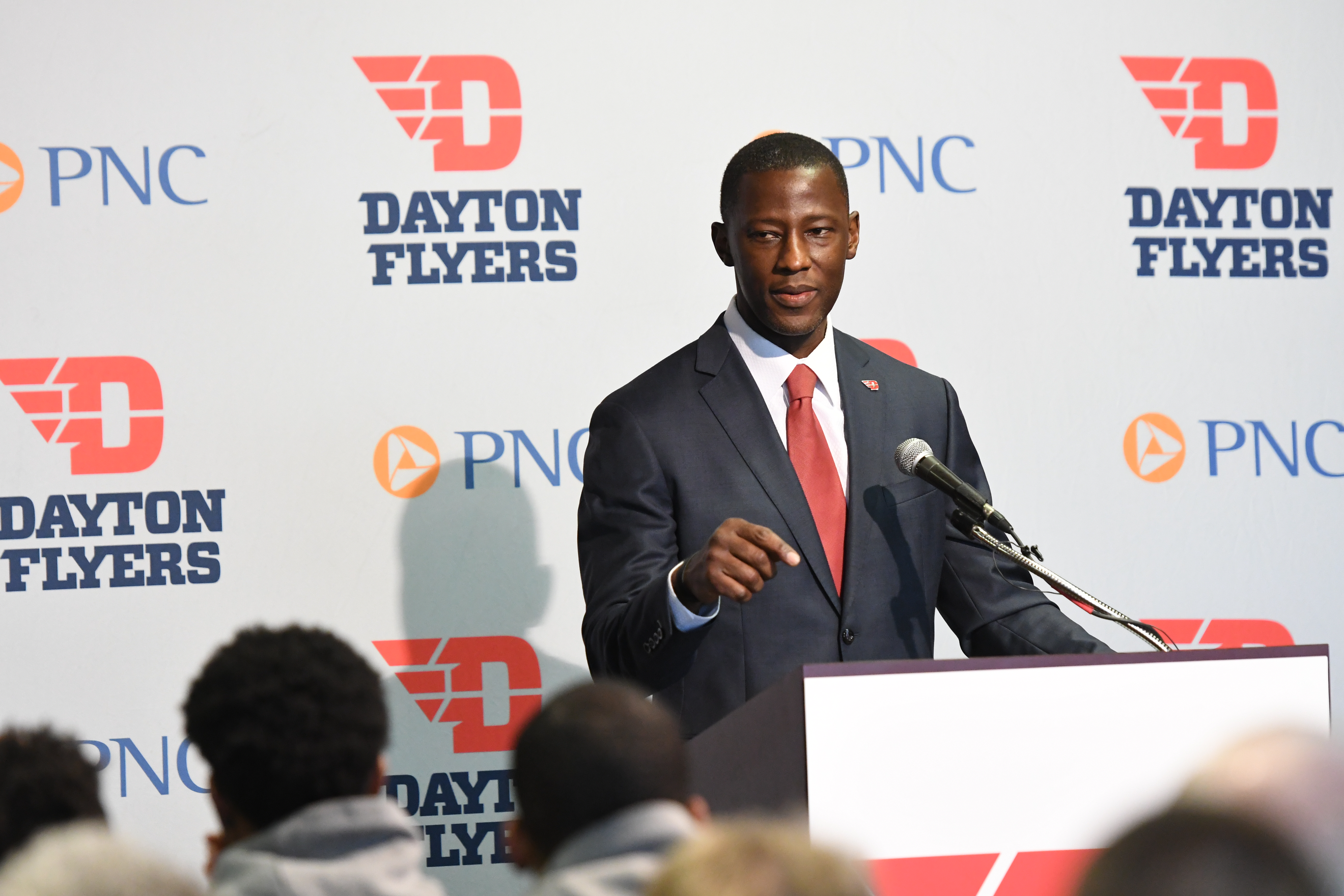
Anthony Grant, the current head coach of the Dayton Flyers.

The following is a list of Dayton Flyers men's basketball head coaches. There have been 20 head coaches of the Flyers in their 118-season history.

Dayton's current head coach is Anthony Grant. He was hired as the Flyers' head coach in March 2017, replacing Archie Miller, who left to become the head coach at Indiana.

No.	Tenure	Coach	Years	Record	Pct.
–	1903–1909	No coach	6	54–9	.857
1	1909–1911	William O'Malley	2	15–6	.714
2	1911–1914; 1919–1920	Harry Solimano	4	34–12	.739
3	1914–1915; 1917–1919	Al Mahrt	3	9–12	.429
4	1915–1917	Alfred McCray	2	19–5	.792
5	1920–1921	Dutch Thiele	1	6–16	.273
6	1921–1922	William Sherry	1	6–8	.429
7	1922–1923	Van F. Hill	1	8–8	.500
8	1923–1928	Harry Baujan	5	46–38	.548
9	1928–1929	George Fitzgerald	1	9–10	.474
10	1929–1933	Bill Belanich	4	16–48	.250
11	1933–1935	Louis Tschudi	2	13–18	.419
12	1935–1939	Joe Holsinger	4	18–48	.273
13	1939–1947 (Note: Dayton did not field a team for the 1943–44 or 1944–45 seasons.)	James Carter	6	41–75	.353
14	1947–1964	Tom Blackburn	17	352–141	.714
15	1964–1989	Don Donoher	25	437–275	.614
16	1989–1994	Jim O'Brien	5	61–87	.412
17	1994–2003	Oliver Purnell	9	155–116	.572
18	2003–2011	Brian Gregory	8	172–94	.647
19	2011–2017	Archie Miller	6	139–63	.688
20	2017–present	Anthony Grant	6	124–64	.660
Totals		20 coaches	118 seasons	1,734–1,153	.601
Records updated through end of 2022–23 season Source
