= Mahrt =

Mahrt is a surname. Notable people with this surname include:

- Al Mahrt (1893–1970), American football player
- Armin Mahrt (1897–?), American football player
- Haakon Bugge Mahrt (1901–1990), Norwegian writer
- Jan Bugge-Mahrt (born 1954), Norwegian diplomat
- Lou Mahrt (1904–1982), American football player
- Preben Mahrt (1920–1989), Danish actor
