= DARC =

DARC or Darc may refer to:

== Science and technology ==
- DARC (gene) (Duffy antigen/chemokine receptor)
- Data Radio Channel, data over FM radio broadcasts

== Organisations ==
- Dayton Area Rugby Club
- Deutscher Amateur-Radio-Club
- Durham Amateur Rowing Club

== People ==
- Daniel Darc (1959–2013), French singer
- Joana Darc (born 1989), Brazilian politician
- Mireille Darc (1938–2017), French model and actress

== Other uses ==
- Duke Annual Robo-Climb Competition, Duke University, US
- Deep Space Advanced Radar Capability, of the United States Space Force

== See also ==
- Darc (film), a 2018 American thriller filme
- Darcs, a distributed version control system
- Dark, an absence of visible light
