= Augie Cabrinha =

American football player (1902–1979)

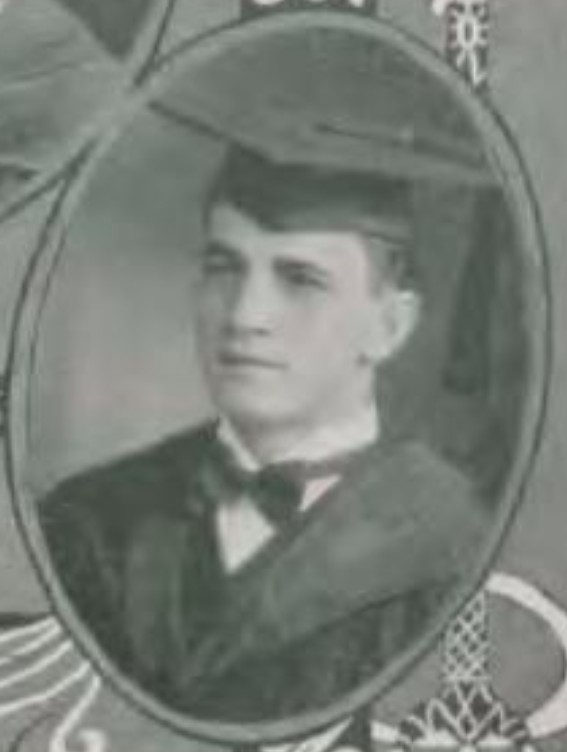
- Cabrinha's 1927 yearbook picture at Dayton

No. 2
- Position: Wingback

Personal information
- Born: April 13, 1902; Honomu, Hawaii, US
- Died: March 8, 1979 (aged 76); Honolulu, Hawaii, US
- Listed height: 5 ft 9 in (1.75 m)
- Listed weight: 170 lb (77 kg)

Career information
- High school: Saint Louis (Honolulu, Hawaii)
- College: Dayton

Career history

Playing
- Dayton Triangles (1927)

Coaching
- Chaminade Julienne High School (1927) Head coach

Career statistics
- Games played: 3
- Games started: 1
- Stats at Pro Football Reference

August Hermenegilde Cabrinha (April 13, 1902 – March 8, 1979) was an American football wingback for the Dayton Triangles of the National Football League. He played college football at Dayton.

== Early life ==
Cabrinha was born on April 13, 1902, in Honomu, Hawaii, to Portuguese parents.

Cabrinha was a member of the Boy Scouts. He attended Saint Louis School in Honolulu, at the time known as Saint Louis College, where he played football. He graduated from the school in 1923.

== College career ==
Cabrinha attended the University of Dayton from 1923 to 1927, where he was known as "Cabby." He played football for the Dayton Flyers from 1924 to 1926, scoring 121 points in total over those three years. Among his football teammates was Walter "Sneeze" Achiu, who he had also played with during his days at Saint Louis.

Cabrinha was also a track runner at Dayton in 1926 and 1927, serving as captain in his final year. He was named first athlete of the year in 1927 and graduated with a degree in civil engineering.

He was inducted into the Dayton Hall of Fame in 1974, the same year as Achiu.

== NFL career ==
In 1927, Cabrinha became the first Hawaiian-born player in the NFL when he joined the Dayton Triangles. As a Triangle, he was again teammates with Achiu, with both playing wingback.

Cabrinha played three games with the Triangles in 1927, starting one. The first of these appearances was in the team's first game of the season, a September 18 matchup against the Green Bay Packers. The Triangles lost this game 14–0.

== Later life ==
=== Brief coaching career ===
Cabrinha taught at Chaminade Julienne High School in 1927 and coached the Chaminade Eagles while there. He returned to Hawaii in 1928 due to his father becoming ill.

=== Military service ===
In the 1930s, Cabrinha served in the 299th Infantry of the Hawaii National Guard.

During World War II, Cabrinha served in the United States Army and attained the rank of captain. He participated in the Battle of Saipan.

== Family ==
Cabrinha's younger brother, Joe, was also a Saint Louis School and Dayton Flyers football player, serving as the Flyers' captain in 1930.

August Cabrinha and his first wife Talula (née Hayselden) had two sons, Alvin and James. After Talula's death in 1961, Cabrinha married his second wife, Virginia. Virginia died on November 15, 1978, less than four months before Cabrinha.

== Death ==
Cabrinha died on March 8, 1979, in Honolulu, at the age of 76. He is buried in the National Memorial Cemetery of the Pacific.
