= St. Mary's (Ohio) football, 1910–1919 =

American college football seasons

The St. Mary's (Ohio) football program from 1910 to 1919 represented St. Mary's College (later renamed the University of Dayton) in its second decade of intercollegiate football. The team during those years was led by four head coaches: Orville Smith was the head coach in 1910 and compiled a 5–1 record; Roland Bevan was the head coach in 1911 and 1912, compiling a 7–5–1 record; Louis Clark was the head coach in 1913, 1917, and 1918 and compiled a 12–4–1 record; Alfred McCray was the head coach from 1914 to 1916 and compiled a 9–7 record; and Harry Solimano was the coach in 1919 and compiled a 2–2 record.

== 1910 ==
1910 St. Mary's (Ohio) football
- Conference: Independent
- Record: 5–1
- Head coach: Orville Smith (1st season)

The 1910 St. Mary's (Ohio) football team represented St. Mary's College as an independent during the 1910 college football season. In its first season under head coach Orville Smith, the team compiled a 5–1 record.

=== Schedule ===
| Date | Opponent | Site | Result |
|---|---|---|---|
| | Deaf Mutes | | W 64–0 |
| | Earlham Reserves | | W 29–0 |
| | Xavier | | W 45–3 |
| | Antioch | | W 10–0 |
| | Xavier | | L 5–6 |
| | St. Patrick's | | W 22–6 |

== 1911 ==
1911 St. Mary's (Ohio) football
- Conference: Independent
- Record: 3–3–1
- Head coach: Roland Bevan (1st season)

The 1911 St. Mary's (Ohio) football teamrepresented St. Mary's College as an independent during the 1911 college football season. In its first season under head coach Roland Bevan, the team compiled a 3–3–1 record.

=== Schedule ===
| Date | Opponent | Site | Result |
|---|---|---|---|
| | Otterbein | | L 0–22 |
| | Antioch | | W 11–0 |
| | Cedarville | | W 56–0 |
| | Earlham | | L 0–39 |
| | St. Patrick's | | W 32–0 |
| | Wilmington | | T 5–5 |
| | Xavier | | L 0–5 |

== 1912 ==
1912 St. Mary's (Ohio) football
- Conference: Independent
- Record: 4–2
- Head coach: Roland Bevan (2nd season)

The 1912 St. Mary's (Ohio) football team represented St. Mary's College as an independent during the 1912 college football season. In its second and final season under head coach Roland Bevan, the team compiled a 4–2 record.

=== Schedule ===
| Date | Opponent | Site | Result |
|---|---|---|---|
| | Wittenberg | | L 8–34 |
| | Aquinas | | W 20–0 |
| | Otterbein | | W 14–12 |
| | Xavier | | W 40–0 |
| | Wilmington | | W 40–0 |
| | Antioch | | L 0–13 |

== 1913 ==
1913 St. Mary's (Ohio) football
- Conference: Independent
- Record: 4–1–1
- Head coach: Louis Clark (1st season)

The 1913 St. Mary's (Ohio) football team represented St. Mary's College as an independent during the 1913 college football season. In its first season under head coach Louis Clark, the team compiled a 4–1–1 record.

=== Schedule ===
| Date | Opponent | Site | Result |
|---|---|---|---|
| | Antioch | | W 6–2 |
| | Earlham | | W 7–6 |
| | Wilmington | | W 46–0 |
| | Transylvania | | T 6–6 |
| | Muskingum | | L 0–20 |
| | Wittenberg | | W 19–3 |

== 1914 ==
1914 St. Mary's (Ohio) football
- Conference: Independent
- Record: 2–2
- Head coach: Alfred McCray (1st season)

The 1914 Dayton Flyers football team represented St. Mary's College as an independent during the 1914 college football season. In its first season under head coach Alfred McCray, the team compiled a 2–2 record.

=== Schedule ===
| Date | Opponent | Site | Result |
|---|---|---|---|
| | Antioch | | L 0–7 |
| | Ohio Northern | | W 14–0 |
| | Wilmington | | W 13–7 |
| | Antioch | | L 19–20 |

== 1915 ==
1915 St. Mary's (Ohio) football
- Conference: Independent
- Record: 3–2
- Head coach: Alfred McCray (2nd season)

The 1915 St. Mary's (Ohio) football team represented St. Mary's College as an independent during the 1915 college football season. In its second season under head coach Alfred McCray, the team compiled a 3–2 record.

=== Schedule ===
| Date | Opponent | Site | Result |
|---|---|---|---|
| | Antioch | | W 10–6 |
| | Alumni | | W 20–0 |
| | Georgetown | | L 6–9 |
| | Wilmington | | L 0–7 |
| | Antioch | | W 13–0 |

== 1916 ==
1916 St. Mary's (Ohio) football
- Conference: Independent
- Record: 4–3
- Head coach: Alfred McCray (3rd season)

The 1916 St. Mary's (Ohio) football team represented St. Mary's College as an independent during the 1916 college football season. In its third and final season under head coach Alfred McCray, the team compiled a 4–3 record.

=== Schedule ===
| Date | Opponent | Site | Result | Source |
|---|---|---|---|---|
| October 7 | Deaf Mutes of Columbus | Dayton, Ohio | W 53–7 | |
| | Wilmington | Dayton, Ohio | L 0–22 | |
| | at Marietta | Marietta, Ohio | L 0–93 | |
| | at Otterbein | Westerville, Ohio | L 10–55 | |
| | vs. Dayton alumni | Dayton, Ohio | W 19–0 | |
| | Wilmington | Dayton, Ohio | W 20–7 | |
| November 25 | Aquinas (OH) | Dayton, OH | W 67–7 | |

== 1917 ==
1917 St. Mary's (Ohio) football
- Conference: Independent
- Record: 7–2
- Head coach: Louis Clark (2nd season)

The 1917 St. Mary's (Ohio) football team represented St. Mary's College as an independent during the 1917 college football season. In its second season under head coach Louis Clark, the team compiled a 7–2 record. Fullback Ludwig Virant was elected as the team captain.

=== Schedule ===
| Date | Opponent | Site | Result | Source |
|---|---|---|---|---|
| October 6 | Aquinas (OH) | Dayton, Ohio | W 25–0 | |
| October 13 | at St. Xavier | Cincinnati, OH | L 3–7 | |
| October 20 | Alumni | Dayton, OH | W 35–0 | |
| October 26 | at Wilmington (OH) | Wilmington, OH | W 13–0 | |
| November 1 | Findlay | St. Mary's campus; Dayton, OH | W 60–0 | |
| November 9 | Wilmington (OH) | Dayton, OH | W 30–0 | |
| November 17 | 44th Aeros | South Park gridiron; Dayton, OH | W 13–0 | |
| November 23 | vs. Ohio Northern | Lima, OH | L 0–12 | |
| December 1 | 44th Aeros | Dayton, OH | W 7–0 | |

== 1918 ==
1918 St. Mary's (Ohio) football
- Conference: Independent
- Record: 1–1
- Head coach: Louis Clark (3rd season)

The 1918 St. Mary's (Ohio) football team represented St. Mary's College as an independent during the 1918 college football season. In its third and final season under head coach Louis Clark, the team compiled a 1–1 record.

=== Schedule ===
| Date | Opponent | Site | Result |
|---|---|---|---|
| | Naval Reserve | | W 6–0 |
| | Georgetown (KY) | | L 0–20 |

== 1919 ==
1919 St. Mary's (Ohio) football
- Conference: Independent
- Record: 2–2
- Head coach: Harry Solimano (1st season)

The 1919 St. Mary's (Ohio) football team represented St. Mary's College as an independent during the 1919 college football season. In its first and only season under head coach Harry Solimano, the team compiled a 2–2 record.

=== Schedule ===
| Date | Opponent | Site | Result | Source |
|---|---|---|---|---|
| October 18 | at Georgetown (KY) | Georgetown, KY | L 0–20 | |
| October 25 | Alumni | Dayton, OH | W 13–0 | |
| November 8 | Wilmington | Dayton, OH | W 18–7 | |
| November 15 | at Wilmington | Wilmington, OH | L 0–14 | |
