= Seven Society (disambiguation) =

Seven Society most often refers to:

- Seven Society - a secret society at the University of Virginia
- Seven Society, Order of the Crown & Dagger - a secret society at the College of William & Mary

Seven Society may also refer to:

- Society of Seven - the variety troupe/showband

== See also ==
- Mystical Seven (Missouri) - a secret society at the University of Missouri
- Mystical Seven (Wesleyan) - an intercollegiate fraternity at Wesleyan University
