= Mystical Seven =

Mystical Seven may refer to:

- Mystical Seven (Wesleyan), an intercollegiate fraternity founded in 1837 at Wesleyan University
- Mystical Seven (Missouri), a secret society established in 1907 at the University of Missouri

== See also ==
- Seven Society (University of Virginia), a secret society established in 1905 at the University of Virginia
- Seven Society (College of William & Mary), a secret society established in 1826 at the College of William & Mary
