= 1913 Dayton St. Mary's Cadets season =

American football team season

- Head coach: Louis Clark
- Home stadium: Westwood Field

Results
- Record: 7–0

The 1913 Dayton St. Mary's Cadets season was their first season in existence, as a player in the unofficial Ohio League. It was the first season for a team that would ultimately go on to become the Indianapolis Colts The team finished with a 7–0 record.

== Schedule ==
Week	Date	Opponent	Result	Record	Venue
1	October 12	Newcastle Maxwell-Briscoes	W 66–2	1–0	Highland Park
2	October 19	Cincinnati Crimson Athletic Club	W 46–0	2–0	Highland Park
3	October 1	at Cincinnati Christ Church	W 21–0	3–0	East End Field
4	November 12	Marion Eagles	W 35–0	4–0	Highland Park
5	November 16	at Dayton Oakwoods	W 14–9	5–0	Westwood Field
6	November 23	at Cincinnati Celts	W 27–0	6–0	Redland Field
7	November 27	Dayton Oakwoods	W 26–21	7–0	Highland Park
