= I Am the College of William and Mary =

Poem by Dudley W. Woodbridge

I Am the College of William and Mary (also known simply as I Am the college) was written in 1945 by Dr. Dudley W. Woodbridge, esteemed professor (1927–1966) and inaugural dean of the revived Law School at the College of William & Mary in Williamsburg, Virginia. The narrative poem recounts William & Mary's historic legacy as the seventh oldest college in the English-speaking world (second oldest in North America after Harvard University).

Made popular by the Seven Society, Order of the Crown & Dagger, which adopted I Am the College as its official poem, Dean Woodbridge's verses are meant to foster unity and engender pride across the university. The poem is commonly cited by members of the William & Mary community and can be found displayed in a number of campus buildings and offices.

== Text ==
I Am the College of William and Mary by Dr. D. W. Woodbridge (1945)

We are the beautiful buildings, the stately trees, the statue of Lord Botetourt, the friendly campus. We are part of the College of William and Mary.

We are the scholars, the philosophers, the scientists that have pioneered human progress. We come from every corner of the globe and from the remotest periods of recorded history. We are part of the College of William and Mary.

We are the youth whom the call of duty tore from the college's bosom. We are fighting and dying in a thousand climes without a thought of personal sacrifice, that colleges like William and Mary might live. We are part of the College of William and Mary.

We are the great freedoms of humanity: freedom of thought, freedom of press, freedom of conscience, freedom of speech in whose presence tyranny and falsehood cannot long survive. We are part of the College of William and Mary.

We are the traditions of the college: the tradition of honor, the tradition of service, the tradition of loyalty. We are intangible, but whenever you think of the college, or sing her alma mater you feel that we are very real. We are part of the College of William and Mary.

We are the City of Williamsburg and the Counties of York and James City. Our people serve the college in myriad ways, ministering to all her manifold needs. We are part of the College of William and Mary.

I am the Commonwealth of Virginia. My history and that of the college are inseparable. I was at her side in her darkest hours, when her friends were penniless, her faculty dispersed, her halls empty. Through me, the humblest citizen contributes to her support so that she may live and prosper. We are part of the College of William and Mary.

We are the people of the United States. Restored Williamsburg is our shrine. We come by the tens of thousands to be instructed and inspired. We are part of the College of William and Mary.

We are the Board of Visitors. We determine the policies of the college. On the wisdom of these policies her very existence may depend. We give generously from busy lives without pecuniary reward. We are part of the College of William and Mary.

We are the President and the Administration. We weld into one harmonious whole all the diverse elements of the college and cause them to function smoothly as an educated institution of the First Order. We are part of the College of William and Mary.

We are the faculty. Into our hands is trusted the instruction of youth, humanity's most precious possession. We are part of the College of William and Mary.

We are the college's activities: the athletics, the publications, the social clubs. We educate the students in courage, in honor, in dependability, and in the social graces. We are part of the College of William and Mary.

We are the alumni, both living and dead, upon whose minds the imprint of the college has been planted. The college never forgets us though some of us may forget her. We are part of the College of William and Mary.

We are the students. We attend our Alma Mater in never ending processions and receive bountiful gifts. We are part of the College of William and Mary.

We are the fathers and mothers, the brothers and sisters, the friends and well wishers of the students in residence. We rejoice at their accomplishments. We are part of the College of William and Mary.

We are the countless generations to come. The college was founded to serve us. We are part of the College of William and Mary.

I am the College of William and Mary. I have been forged on the anvil of time by master workmen. I have faith in humanity under God. I believe in a glorious future. I am the College of William and Mary.
