= Louis Clark (American football coach) =

American football coach and player

Playing career
- 1908–1911: St. Mary's (OH)
- 1915–1916: Dayton Triangles
- Position: Guard

Coaching career (HC unless noted)
- 1913: St. Mary's (OH)
- 1913–1914: Dayton Triangles
- 1917–1918: St. Mary's (OH)

Head coaching record
- Overall: 12–4–1 (college); 12–5 (professional)

Louis "Foose" Clark was an American football player and coach at both the college and professional levels. He played for St. Mary's College—now known as the University of Dayton— from the 1908 through 1911 seasons, before becoming their head coach. Clark was also the first head coach of the Dayton Triangles, an early professional football franchise that entered into the National Football League (NFL) after Clark's playing and coaching careers for the team were over.

At St. Mary's, Clark compiled an overall head coaching record of 12–4–1 in three seasons. Professionally, Clark coached the Triangles to an overall mark of 12–5, including back-to-back Ohio City championships in 1913 and 1914. Clark was also a player on the team during the 1915 and 1916 seasons.

== Head coaching record ==
=== College ===
Year	Team	Overall	Conference	Standing	Bowl/playoffs
St. Mary's (Ohio) (Independent) (1913)
1913	St. Mary's	4–1–1			
St. Mary's (Ohio) (Independent) (1917–1918)
1917	St. Mary's	7–2			
1918	St. Mary's	1–1			
St. Mary's:		12–4–1			
Total:		12–4–1			

=== Professional ===
Team	Year	Regular Season					Postseason			
Team	Year	Won	Lost	Ties	Win %	Finish	Won	Lost	Win %	Result
DAY	1913	7	0	0	1.000	No official standings	N/A	N/A	N/A	N/A
DAY	1914	5	5	0	0.500	No official standings	N/A	N/A	N/A	N/A
Total		12	5	0	.705		–	–	–	
Overall Total		12	5	0	.705	Ohio City Championships (2)				
