= 1914 Dayton St. Mary's Cadets season =

American football team season

- Head coach: Louis Clark
- Home stadium: Westwood Field

Results
- Record: 5-5

The 1914 Dayton St. Mary's Cadets season was their second season in the Ohio League. The team posted a 5–5 record.

== Schedule ==
Game	Date	Opponent	Result	Record
1	September 27	Cincinnati Shamrock-Crimson	W 48–0	1–0
2	October 4	at Wabash Athletic Association	L 19–14	1–1
3	October 11	Muncie Congerville A.C.	L 7–15	1–2
4	October 22	at Cincinnati Christ Church	W 20–7	2–2
5	October 25	West Carrollton Paper Mill	W 19–18	3–2
6	November 1	at Covington Catholic Athletic Club	L 0–17	3–3
7	November 15	Dayton Oakwoods	L 0–6	3–4
8	November 22	Cincinnati Christ Church	L 0–13	3–5
9	November 26	Dayton Oakwoods	W 3–0	4–5
10	November 29	Dayton Oakwoods	W 3–0	5–5
