= Arthur Matsu =

American football player and coach

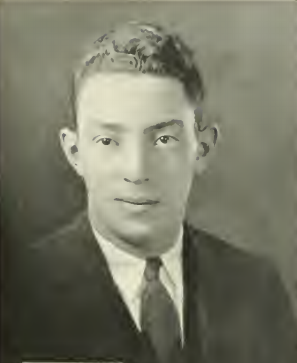
- Matsu in 1927

Biographical details
- Born: April 30, 1904; Glasgow, Scotland
- Died: May 28, 1987 (aged 83); Arizona, U.S.

Playing career
- 1923–1926: William & Mary
- 1928: Dayton Triangles
- Position: Quarterback

Coaching career (HC unless noted)
- 1929: Asheville HS (NC)
- 1930: Benedictine HS (VA)
- 1931–1950s: Rutgers (assistant)

Arthur A. Matsu (April 30, 1904 – May 28, 1987) was an American football player and coach. He was the first Asian-American student at The College of William & Mary and the quarterback and captain of the school's football team. He was later selected by the Richmond Times-Dispatch as the best quarterback to play at William & Mary in the first half of the 20th century. He played one season of professional football for the Dayton Triangles and was the first Asian-American quarterback in the National Football League. He was an assistant football coach at Rutgers University for more than 20 years.

== Early years ==
Matsu was born in Glasgow, Scotland in 1904. His father was Japanese, and his mother was Scottish. He moved with his family to Canada as a young child and then to Cleveland, Ohio. By age 13, Matsu had shown himself to be an exceptional athlete and was being compared to Jim Thorpe. Sportswriter Paul Purman wrote a nationally syndicated story about Matsu in July 1917. Purman wrote that Matsu played first base on an undefeated baseball team, played halfback for a high school football team, played forward on an amateur basketball team, set the Cleveland junior records in the 50, 75 and 100-yard dashes, pole-vaulted 7 feet, 4 inches, was a champion swimmer at the Cleveland Y.M.C.A, played "a fair game of tennis," and caddied at a golf course. Purman concluded: "Even Jim Thorpe and Howard Berry, all around athletes de luxe, will have to doff their chapeaux to this Japanese youth who claims Cleveland as his home and who doesn't balk at anything in the athletic line except auto racing and poker."

Matsu continued to excel as an athlete and became a multi-sport star at Cleveland's East High School. In August 1923, he won the national scholastic diving championship. He was recruited as an athlete by both Princeton University and The College of William & Mary.

== William & Mary ==
At the urging of football coach J. Wilder Tasker, Matsu chose William & Mary, the second oldest college in the United States located in Williamsburg, Virginia. Matsu was the first Asian-American student at William & Mary and a star athlete in football, basketball, baseball, and track (as a pole vaulter). He gained national acclaim as the quarterback for the William & Mary Tribe football team from 1923 to 1926. In December 1925, he was selected by his teammates as the captain of the 1926 team. He was the first Asian-American to be selected as the captain of an American college football team.

Matsu was considered a "triple-threat man" due to his ability to pass, run, and punt. While much of the press coverage focused on the novelty of a Japanese football player, the coverage also emphasized his athleticism. In October 1925, one writer noted

Harvard probably will face something new Saturday in playing William and Mary College to the extent of being opposed by a Japanese quarterback. Yale had a Chinese shortstop but so far as known, Art Matsu is the only Japanese playing college football in the east. ... Matsu ... is a splendid player and good field general.

He gained further notice for scoring against every major college football team that he played against from 1923 to 1925. In February 1926, another sportswriter observed: "An able, consistent punter, good ball carrier, and sure tackler, the Japanese makes up in brains and speed what he lacks in poundage." A nationally syndicated profile on Matsu was published in the fall of 1926; the article reviewed his academic and sporting accomplishments and concluded: "The college with its 1,100 students, half of whom are coeds, are proud of their Jap Captain, the first of his nationality to gain fame on the gridiron." After a game against Harvard in 1925, The New York Times wrote

Matsu, the quarterback, who is of Scotch and Japanese parents, played a splendid game. Besides punting in fine fashion and making some steady advances when he carried the ball, the tall and thin player saved his team many times when he called the plays so that the Crimson defense was baffled.

Matsu also served as a campus leader at William & Mary and was elected as the president of the Varsity Club and a member of the school's secret society, the Seven Society. In 1924, while Matsu was attending William & Mary, the State of Virginia passed a law prohibiting marriage between whites and Asians, a law under which the marriage between Matsu's parents would have been illegal. One author has suggested that the law may have passed in response to the presence and popularity of Matsu on the William & Mary campus: "[F]ears that Matsu's popularity would spark interracial fraternization may have helped prompt Virginia's Legislature to pass the Racial Purity Act in 1924, extending the state's miscegenation law and explicitly forbidding intermarriage between Asians and whites."

The Richmond Times-Dispatch later selected Matsu as the best quarterback to play at William & Mary in the first half of the 20th century, and the New York Sun rated him as the second best quarterback in the school's history.

== Professional football ==
Matsu played professional football for the Dayton Triangles in 1928. He joined Walter "Sneeze" Achiu on the Daytons. A native of Hawaii, Achiu was the first Asian-American to play in the National Football League. Matsu appeared in six of seven games played by the Triangles in 1928, including four as a starter. The Daytons finished the season with a record of 0–7 in last place in the NFL. He was the only starting NFL quarterback with Japanese ancestry until Jayden Daniels in 2024.

On January 1, 1930, Matsu was the quarterback for a Virginia all-star team that played against Benny Friedman's all-star professional team in a game at Richmond Stadium. Matsu completed a touchdown pass that covered more than 60 yards for the Virginia squad.

== Coaching ==
In September 1929, Matsu was hired as the head football coach at Asheville High School in Asheville, North Carolina. He was reported by the Associated Press to be "the first Japanese football coach." In 1930, Matsu moved to Richmond, Virginia, as the head football coach at Benedictine Preparatory School. His 1930 Benedictine team became renowned for its aerial attack.

In 1931, J. Wilder Tasker, who had coached Matsu at William & Mary, was hired as the head football coach at Rutgers University. He promptly recruited Matsu to join him as the backfield coach at Rutgers. Matsu also taught physical education at Rutgers and was promoted from instructor to assistant professor in June 1934. Matsu remained an assistant football coach at Rutgers from 1931 until the 1950s. He served as the freshman coach in the late 1930 and was assigned to do publicity work in the spring of 1941. He was Rutgers' backfield coach in the early 1950s and resumed responsibility as the freshman coach in 1955. Frank Burns, who played quarterback for Rutgers in the 1950s, said of Matsu: "He was a master of offensive football, a true innovator."

== Later years ==
Matsu moved to Arizona in the late 1950s. During his later years, he worked as a real estate salesman and did scouting for Arizona State University. He died in May 1987.
