= 1917 Dayton Triangles season =

American football team season

- Head coach: Bud Talbott
- Home stadium: Triangle Park

Results
- Record: 5–1–2

The 1917 Dayton Triangles season was their fifth season in the Ohio League. The team posted a 5–1–2 record.

== Schedule ==
Game	Date	Opponent	Result
1	October 7, 1917	42nd Aero Squad	W 54–6
2	October 14, 1917	Elyria Athletics	W 48–0
3	October 21, 1917	at Toledo Maroons	L 15–0
4	November 4, 1917	McKeesport Olympics	W 29–0
5	November 11, 1917	Cincinnati Celts	T 0–0
6	November 18, 1917	Toledo Maroons	W 26–0
7	November 25, 1917	at Cincinnati Celts	T 7–7
8	December 2, 1917	Cincinnati Celts	W 21–0
