= Roland Bevan =

American football and basketball coach (1888–1957)

Biographical details
- Born: October 12, 1888; Berne, Ohio, U.S.
- Died: August 16, 1957 (aged 68); Dayton, Ohio, U.S.
- Education: Bucknell

Coaching career (HC unless noted)

Football
- 1911–1912: St. Mary's (OH)
- 1913–1914: Muskingum
- 1916–1917: Ohio Northern (assistant)
- 1918–1921: Dayton Steele HS (OH)
- 1927: Youngstown Rayen HS (OH)
- 1934: Toledo Woodward HS (OH)
- 1935–1940: Dartmouth (trainer)
- 1941–1956: Army (trainer)

Basketball
- 1915–1916: Ohio Northern
- 1917–1919: Ohio Northern

Head coaching record
- Overall: 12–12–2 (college football)

Roland Bevan (October 12, 1888 – August 16, 1957) was an American college football and college basketball coach. He served as the head football coach at St. Mary's College—now known as the University of Dayton— from 1911 to 1912 and Muskingum University in Concord, Ohio from 1913 to 1914, compiling a career college football coaching record of 12–12–2. After serving as a high school football coach at several stops in Ohio, he made his way to Dartmouth College, where he was a trainer.

At the time of his death in 1957, he was working as a trainer for the United States Military Academy at West Point, New York.

== Head coaching record ==
=== College football ===
Year	Team	Overall	Conference	Standing	Bowl/playoffs
St. Mary's (Ohio) (Independent) (1911–1912)
1911	St. Mary's	3–3–1			
1912	St. Mary's	4–2			
St. Mary's:		7–5–1			
Muskingum Fighting Muskies (Independent) (1913–1914)
1913	Muskingum	3–2–1			
1914	Muskingum	2–5			
Muskingum:		5–7–1			
Total:		12–12–2			
