= China Arena Football League =

Former Chinese arena football league

China Arena Football League (CAFL) 全国美式室内橄榄球职业联赛
- China Arena Football League
- Formerly: AFL China; China American Football League
- Sport: Arena football
- Founded: 2012
- Founder: Martin E. Judge Jr.
- First season: 2016
- President: Ed Wang (王凯)
- No. of teams: 4
- Country: China
- Headquarters: Beijing, China
- Continent: Asia
- Most recent champion: Wuhan Gators (1st title)
- Most titles: Beijing Lions; Wuhan Gators (1 title each)
- Website: CAFLFootball.com

China Arena Football League
- Simplified Chinese: 全国美式室内橄榄球职业联赛
- Traditional Chinese: 全國美式室內橄欖球職業聯賽
Transcriptions
Standard Mandarin
- Hanyu Pinyin: Quánguó Měishì Shìnèi Gǎnlǎnqiú Zhíyè Liánsài

The China Arena Football League (simplified Chinese: 全国美式室内橄榄球职业联赛; traditional Chinese: 全國美式室內橄欖球職業聯賽; pinyin: Quánguó Měishì Shìnèi Gǎnlǎnqiú Zhíyè Liánsài), often abbreviated as the CAFL, was a professional arena football league that played its games in the People's Republic of China. It featured players from the now-defunct Arena Football League (AFL) and other indoor football leagues' rosters while also using players from China or who are of Chinese descent, The six team, eight-on-eight football league consisted of four Chinese players and four "foreign" players on the field at a time. The league began play in the fall of 2016 and held two seasons, one in 2016 and another, heavily abbreviated, schedule in 2019. It was the first professional American football league to play in China. The CAFL was not directly affiliated with the AFL, instead owned by AFL Global, LLC, a company that was created by Martin E. Judge Jr.

== History ==
In August 2012, Ganlan Media International received exclusive rights from the AFL to establish a new Chinese arena football league. The project was headed up by Martin E. Judge, Jr. and Ron Jaworski, who are both part of the Philadelphia Soul's ownership group. The CAFL has been branded as AFL China, the China American Football League and the China Arena Football League. The China Arena Football League has stuck as the league's official name. AFL coaches and trainers traveled to China to help teach the rules of the sport to squads made up of Chinese and American players with the goal of starting an official Chinese arena league.

AFL China and Ganlan Media were created in 2012 by businessman Martin E. Judge, Jr., founder and owner of the Judge Group. The company, called AFL Global, LLC, looks to introduce and launch professional Arena Football teams and franchises in various locations throughout the world (a la NFL Europe). After their successful trip to China to help promote the game, they formally announced plans to further develop AFL China by the fall of 2014 by starting a comprehensive training program in May 2013 with exhibition games planned for the cities of Beijing and Guangzhou in October. This would be the first time professional football of any kind will be played in China with the support of the Chinese government and the CRFA (Chinese Rugby Football Association).

On November 2, 2013, AFL China and Ganlan Media presented its first exhibition "all-star game" at the Neal Blaisdell Arena in Honolulu, Hawaii, which was the home of the af2's Hawaiian Islanders from 2002 to 2004. The East vs. West set-up featured AFL players, led by quarterbacks Dan Raudabaugh (Philadelphia Soul) for the East All-Stars and Nick Davila (Arizona Rattlers) for the West All-Stars. Clint Dolezel (Philadelphia) coached the East and Kevin Guy (Arizona) coached the West. The East won that contest 67–63. On November 10, 2013, the second all-star game with the same two teams took place in front of over 6,000 fans at Capital Gymnasium in Beijing, China, making it the first-ever professional football game of any kind, outdoor or indoor, to be played in China. The East won that game 69–52. Ganlan Media has since dropped its corporate name and AFL Global, LLC, has become the sole rights-holder to the league which changed its name from AFL China to the CAFL.

In October 2014, the Chaoyang Sports Centre in Beijing hosted the 2014 Chinese Rugby Festival to help continue to showcase the new sport in China. Six teams, the Hebei Nirvana, Shandong Flames, Shenyang Tigers, Tianjin Pirates, Wuhan Nine Headed Birds and Xian North-West Wolves (all composed of collegiate players), played in a round-robin tournament at the first-ever CAFL University Championships to determine the inaugural champion. Shandong defeated Hebei 46–42 to win the trophy and thus cementing the CAFL's plans for a 2015 launch. Despite being marketed as an indoor game, the inaugural games were played outdoors.

The first government-sanctioned CAFL games were to be played in the fall of 2015; this was later postponed until the next year.

The 2016 season was known as the "Super Series". The championship game was called the "China Bowl". The league held its first draft on June 10, 2016. 120 players were drafted with 60 of them being Americans, including 43 who have AFL experience. 60 players from China or players who are of Chinese descent were selected as well. The league's footballs are provided by Spalding. In September 2016, Xenith became the CAFL's exclusive equipment partner and Legend Sportswear became the CAFL's exclusive jersey and merchandise partner. In 2016, all of the league's games were shown in China on iQiyi and in the United States on ONE World Sports.

In June 2017, it was announced that the 2017 season was being moved to the spring of 2018. The league held the 2017 CAFL Draft on July 10, 2017. The league postponed their second season again, announcing they would not play until 2019. After an abbreviated 2019 season, and the COVID-19 pandemic disrupting worldwide sport, the CAFL's online presence had disappeared or gone offline by 2021.

== Key personnel ==
- Martin E. Judge, Jr. – Founder & Chairman
- Ron Jaworski – Partner
- David Niu – President
- Gary R. Morris – Chief Executive Officer
- Dick Vermeil – League Executive
- Ken Bozarth – Head of Football Operations
- Ed Wang – Vice President of Football Development
- Lou Tilley – Vice President of Creative & Broadcast Operations

== Teams ==
The teams for the inaugural CAFL season were announced on May 3, 2016. The inaugural teams were the Beijing Lions, Dalian Dragon Kings, Guangzhou Power, Qingdao Clipper, Shanghai Skywalkers and Shenzhen Naja. After the 2016 season, the Dalian Dragon Kings and Shenzhen Naja relocated to become the Shenyang Rhinos and Wuhan Gators, respectively.

Location of the current member organisations

Team	City	Arena	Head coach	Joined
Beijing Lions	Beijing	Wukesong Arena	Clint Dolezel	2016
Shanghai Legend	Shanghai	Shanghai Oriental Sports Center	Derek Stingley	2019
Shenyang Rhinos	Shenyang, Liaoning	Shenyang Gymnasium	Robert Gordon	2016
Wuhan Gators	Wuhan, Hubei	Wuhan Sports Center Gymnasium	J. W. Kenton	2016

=== Only played in 2016 ===
Location of the defunct member organisations

Team	City	Arena	Head coach	Joined
Guangzhou Power	Guangzhou, Guangdong	Guangzhou Gymnasium	Ernesto Purnsley	2016
Qingdao Clipper	Qingdao, Shandong	Guoxin Gymnasium	Rod Miller	2016
Shanghai Skywalkers	Shanghai	Shanghai Oriental Sports Center	Derek Stingley	2016
