= Ed Wang =

American football player (born 1987)

No. 71, 73
- Position: Offensive tackle

Personal information
- Born: March 12, 1987 (age 39); Fairfax, Virginia, U.S.
- Listed height: 6 ft 5 in (1.96 m)
- Listed weight: 315 lb (143 kg)

Career information
- High school: Stone Bridge (Ashburn, Virginia)
- College: Virginia Tech
- NFL draft: 2010: 5th round, 140th overall pick

Career history
- Buffalo Bills (2010–2011); Oakland Raiders (2012)*; Philadelphia Eagles (2013)*
- * Offseason or practice squad member only

Awards and highlights
- Second-team All-ACC (2009)

Career NFL statistics
- Games played: 6
- Stats at Pro Football Reference

Edward Kai Wang (born March 12, 1987) is an American former professional football player who was an offensive tackle in the National Football League (NFL). He played college football for the Virginia Tech Hokies and was selected by the Buffalo Bills in the 2010 NFL draft. Wang was the first full-blooded Chinese player to both be drafted and to play in the NFL.

== Early life ==
Wang was born in Fairfax, Virginia. He attended Stone Bridge High School in Ashburn, where he was selected the Gatorade State Player of the Year in 2004.

== College career ==
Wang attended Virginia Tech and was awarded 2009 All-ACC Second-team for his performance at left tackle for the Hokies. He was given the nickname, "Godzilla" due to his aggressive playing style, size, and Asian heritage.

== Professional career ==
=== Buffalo Bills ===
Wang was selected with the 9th pick in the 5th round (140th overall) by the Buffalo Bills. During the 2010 NFL season, he was a reserve offensive lineman and played in six games, starting none. He was waived/injured by the Bills on September 3, 2011, and placed on injured reserve on September 4. He was released by the Bills on November 8, 2011.

=== Oakland Raiders ===
Wang signed with the Oakland Raiders on May 2, 2012. He was waived/injured by the Raiders on August 27 and placed on injured reserve on August 28. On September 5, 2012, he was waived after agreeing to an injury settlement.

=== Philadelphia Eagles ===
On February 15, 2013, Wang signed a two-year deal with the Philadelphia Eagles. On August 19, 2013, he was released by the Eagles.

== Personal ==
Wang's parents were both track and field athletes for China at the 1984 Summer Olympics. His younger brother, David Wang, also played football for Virginia Tech, spent the 2015 off-season with the Saint Louis Rams, played for the Guangzhou Power of the China Arena Football League (CAFL) in 2016 and the Washington Valor of the Arena Football League in 2017.

Wang was the President for the CAFL.

== See also ==
- Asian Americans in sports
