= Armin Mahrt =

American football player (1897–1961)

Profile
- Positions: Tailback, quarterback, halfback

Personal information
- Born: November 9, 1897; Dayton, Ohio, U.S.
- Died: May 7, 1961 (aged 63); Stearns County, Minnesota, U.S.
- Listed height: 5 ft 11 in (1.80 m)
- Listed weight: 175 lb (79 kg)

Career information
- College: University of Dayton, West Virginia University

Career history
- Dayton Triangles (1924–1925); Pottsville Maroons (1925); Dayton Triangles (1926)
- Stats at Pro Football Reference

Armin Richard Mahrt (November 9, 1897 – May 7, 1961) was an American football player from Dayton, Ohio. He played during the early years of the National Football League (NFL) for the Dayton Triangles and the Pottsville Maroons over the course of his three-year career. Mahrt made his NFL debut in 1924 with the Triangles. In 1925 Mahrt played on the Maroons team that won the 1925 NFL Championship, before it was stripped from the team due to a disputed rules violation.

Mahrt attended and played college football for the University of Dayton and West Virginia University. In 1922 a drop kick by Mahrt gave West Virginia a 9–6 victory over rival Pitt in the teams' annual Backyard Brawl. His greatest college game for the Mountaineers took place on October 7, 1922, against Marietta College, when Mahrt scored 24 points on 4 four touchdowns and rushed for 213 yards on 10 carries.
