= Duke Annual Robo-Climb Competition =

Hosted by Duke University, the Duke Annual Robo-Climb Competition (DARC) challenges students to create innovative wall-climbing robots that can ascend vertical surfaces. The competition, which will be held on Duke's campus in Durham, North Carolina, will allow students to showcase their wall-climbing technology in an international forum and encourage students to network with industry leaders.

== General Guidelines ==
The rules for design are very flexible in order to generate maximum technological creativity. The competition will evaluate each robot’s performance in climbing a wall constructed of different materials and obstacles of various dimensions. Each student group will have an opportunity to practice with the wall prior to the competition. Judges will score each robot in five functional areas: utility, navigation, versatility, speed, and innovation.

The functional areas will specifically measure the robot's ability to complete the following tasks:

- Utility: Carry a load in proportion to its own body weight.
- Navigation: Climb the full length of the wall without touching obstacles on the wall.
- Versatility: Climb up surfaces composed of different materials and constructed in various shapes and sizes.
- Speed: Climb up the full length of the wall from bottom to top in any manner as quickly as possible.
- Innovation: Demonstrate unique capabilities, innovative use of technology, general creativity, or style.

== The Wall ==
The wall, as depicted in below, will be used to test the robot’s performance in navigation, versatility, and speed. (The utility and innovation tasks will be performed independently.) The wall measures 9 ft (2.743 m) in height and 8 ft (2.438 m) in width. The wall is made of ferrous metal plated on plywood, and contains three sections composed of different materials and obstacles. The first section, closest to the floor, contain a wooden ramp surface, two obstacles, and one hole. The second section, in the middle of the wall, contains an acrylic glass surface and three obstacles. The third section, at the top of the wall, contains a flat piece of carpet, two obstacles, and a slit.
