= Harry Solimano =

American football and basketball coach

Biographical details
- Born: April 19, 1889
- Died: October 31, 1972 (aged 83)

Playing career

Basketball
- 1903–1904: St. Mary's (OH)

Coaching career (HC unless noted)

Football
- 1919: St. Mary's (OH)

Basketball
- 1911–1914: St. Mary's (OH)
- 1919–1920: St. Mary's (OH)

Head coaching record
- Overall: 2–2 (football); 34–14 (basketball)

Harry Solimano (April 19, 1889 – October 31, 1972) was an American college football and college basketball coach. He was the head football coach at St. Mary's College—now known as the University of Dayton—in 1919, tallying a mark of 2–2. Solimano was also the head basketball coach at St. Mary's from 1911 to 1914 and again in 1919–20, compiling a record of 34–14.

== Head coaching record ==
=== Football ===
Year	Team	Overall	Conference	Standing	Bowl/playoffs
St. Mary's (Ohio) (Independent) (1919)
1919	St. Mary's	2–2			
St. Mary's:		2–2			
Total:		2–2			
