= Dayton Area Rugby Club =

(United States) Dayton Area Rugby Club
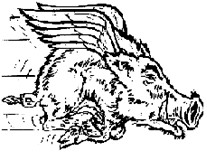
- Nickname: Flying Pigs
- Founded: 1973 (Men); 1979 (Women)
- Location: Dayton, Ohio, United States
- Ground: Dayton Rugby Grounds
- President: Chip Gleason
- Coach(es): Bob Borgerding (Club Coach); Shane Stachurski & Chip Gleason (Men's Coaches); Cynthia Stevenson (Women's Coach); David King (Sevens Coach)
- Captain(s): Chase Szente (Men); Cynthia Stevenson & Irma Perez (Women)
- League(s): Midwest Division III & IV (Men); Midwest Division II (Women)

Official website
- www.daytonrugby.com

Dayton Area Rugby Club (DARC) is a rugby union football club based in Dayton, Ohio, United States. The club currently fields Men's teams in Midwest Divisions III & IV and a Women's team in the Midwest Division II. They play their home games at Dayton Rugby Grounds.

As well as a number of players also coaching at various levels, there are also a few club members who have gone on to continue their involvement in the sport by becoming referees.

== History ==
=== Men's Squad ===
Rugby first came to Dayton, Ohio in the fall of 1969 when a group of University of Dayton students, led by Bob Borgerding, played their first rugby match. The University of Dayton continues to play rugby to this day, fielding both a Men's and a Women's squad.

Club rugby came onto the scene in 1973 with the founding of the Dayton Triangles RFC, named for the first champion of the National Football League, the Dayton Triangles. This name was soon changed to the Miami Valley Rugby Football Club (RFC), later changing its name to Dayton RFC. Wright State University RFC started in 1976 and lasted until 1981 at which point it moved off campus and turned into a Men's team Gem City RFC. Rugby would not return to Wright State University until 1998.

  - At the same time the Wittenberg University RFC and Wright-Patt Jets RFC developed from the Dayton RFC.

In the early 1980s, the Dayton RFC and Gem City RFC merged to form the Dayton Argylls RFC. This arrangement lasted until the early 1990s, when the Dayton Argylls RFC and the Wright-Patt Jets RFC merged.

The current squad logo, which gives the squad its nickname of Flying Pigs, is a winged wild boar, which was chosen as a merger of the Argylls’ boar logo and the Wright Patt Jets' jet aircraft logo.

Over the years, rugby squads in the Dayton area have been very successful. In fifteens competition, the Wright Patt. Jets were Military National Champions. The Argylls, in their final season, placed third in the Midwest Division II Championship. The Flying Pigs qualified for the Midwest Division II Championships in both 1994, 1995, and 2011, placing second in 1994. Dayton has had success in rugby sevens as well, qualifying for the national championship in 1984 and 1985.

In 2016 Dayton added a second team, and currently compete in Midwest Divisions III & IV.

=== Women's Squad ===
The first women's squad was started in 1979 and lasted into the next decade. The Women's squad was reformed in 1999 by Lola Akinmade. The squad has been very successful, winning the Midwest Division II Women's Championship and finishing third in the nation in 2002. During part of its existence, the squad was merged with the women's squad of the Cincinnati Kelts; after a few years as the joint Cincinnati-Dayton Women's squad the team split in 2006 to rejoin their respective city clubs.

== Venues ==
The club has lived up to its current name over the years, using many different venues around the Greater Dayton area. Before the team secured the use of green space for the permanent placement of at Eastwood, in 2007, venues they have used have included Dayton's Carillon Park and Centerville's Leonard E. Stubbs Memorial Park.

In January 2012, the independent Five Rivers Youth Rugby Foundation, (FRYRF), was formed in Dayton. Led by Chris Schreel and Frank Harris, FRYRF purchased the Fenner Fields baseball complex in north Dayton, renaming the facility as Dayton Rugby Grounds (DRG). The rugby community of the Dayton Area worked to turn the seven baseball diamonds into rugby pitches. Much of the work was carried out by volunteers from the club, which has established a Use Agreement with FRYRF to use DRG as their home pitch and beginning Fall of 2013.

In 2013, DRG finish leveling their second pitch and began use in the Fall of 2015.

== See also ==
- Rugby union in the United States
