= Lou Mahrt =

American football player and coach (1904–1982)

Profile
- Positions: Quarterback, Head Coach

Personal information
- Born: July 30, 1904; Florida, U.S.
- Died: August 7, 1982 (aged 78); Dayton, Ohio, U.S.
- Listed height: 5 ft 11 in (1.80 m)
- Listed weight: 178 lb (81 kg)

Career information
- College: Dayton

Career history
- Dayton Triangles (1926–1927)
- Coaching profile at Pro Football Reference
- Stats at Pro Football Reference

Louis Richard Mahrt (July 30, 1904 – August 7, 1982) was a professional football player in 1926 and a player-coach in 1927 for the Dayton Triangles of the National Football League (NFL). Prior to playing in the NFL, Mahrt played college football at the University of Dayton. He was later inducted into the Dayton Athletics Hall of Fame in 1962.
