= Bobby Balcena =

American baseball player (1925–1990)

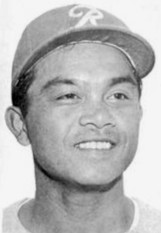
- Left fielder
- Born: August 1, 1925; San Pedro, California, U.S.
- Died: January 5, 1990 (aged 64); San Pedro, California, U.S.
- Batted: Right Threw: Left

MLB debut
- September 16, 1956, for the Cincinnati Redlegs

Last MLB appearance
- September 29, 1956, for the Cincinnati Redlegs

MLB statistics
- Games played: 2
- At bats: 2
- Runs: 2
- Batting average: .000
- Stats at Baseball Reference

Teams
- Cincinnati Redlegs (1956)

Robert Rudolph Balcena (August 1, 1925 – January 5, 1990) was an American professional baseball player. He played as an outfielder in Major League Baseball for the Cincinnati Redlegs during the 1956 season. He had two at-bats and scored two runs as a pinch runner.

Listed at 5 ft 7 in (1.70 m), 160 pounds (73 kg), Balcena batted right-handed and threw left-handed. He was born in San Pedro, California.

Prior to playing professional baseball, Balcena served in the Pacific Ocean theater of World War II with the United States Navy.

Balcena became the first player of Asian-American and Filipino ancestry to appear in a major league game. He had a long distinguished Triple-A career with the Seattle Rainiers as a center fielder in the 1950s; one paper described him as a "popular miniature dynamo of almost infallible perpetual motion" after his Rainier team won the 1955 Pacific Coast League title.

Balcena played from 1952 through 1962 in the minor leagues, including stints with the Leones del Caracas and the Industriales de Valencia in the Venezuelan Professional Baseball League.

He batted .284 with 134 home run and 441 runs batted in in 1948 minor league games. In a VPBL two-season career, he posted a .306 average with five homers and 44 RBI in 87 games.

After his baseball career ended, he worked as a longshoreman in Seattle where he had played parts of four seasons in the minor leagues.

Despite being the first Filipino American to play in the major leagues, Balcena kept company with Slavs during his life. His union president told the Los Angeles Times that he was an "honorary Slav. He always r[a]n around with the San Pedro Slavs. He speaks Slav. He sings Slav." Outside of his professional career, he also played baseball with an amateur team of Yugoslav Americans.

Balcena died in his hometown of San Pedro, California in 1990 at the age of 64.
