= Seven Society (College of William & Mary) =

Secret society at College of William & Mary, US

- Founded: 1826; 200 years ago College of William & Mary
- Type: Secret
- Affiliation: Independent
- Status: Active
- Emphasis: Senior males
- Scope: Local
- Chapters: 1
- Nickname: Seven, Sevens
- Headquarters: Williamsburg, Virginia; United States

The Seven Society, Order of the Crown & Dagger (colloquially known as the Seven '7' Society or Sevens '7s') is a secret society of the College of William & Mary in Williamsburg, Virginia. The clandestine, yet altruistic group is said to consist of seven senior individuals, selected in their junior year. While, historically, graduating members formally announced their identities each spring, today's membership is steeped in mystery and is only revealed upon a member's death.

Now rumored to meet late at night in Colonial Williamsburg's Shields Tavern, present-day Sevens make efforts to honor and encourage those who help strengthen the university. The society pursues philanthropic projects such as scholarships and donations to the College. Sevens have also been known to leave small gifts and tokens of appreciation for unsuspecting groups and individuals (e.g., in 2003, an admissions counselor discovered two dozen golf umbrellas – each adorned with the '7' symbol – after casually mentioning how helpful they'd be during rainy campus tours).

== History ==
The Seven Society is most commonly believed to have been founded in 1826. Little else is known about the society's early history because of lost records due the American Civil War, two devastating campus fires, and the college's subsequent closing from 1881 to 1888.

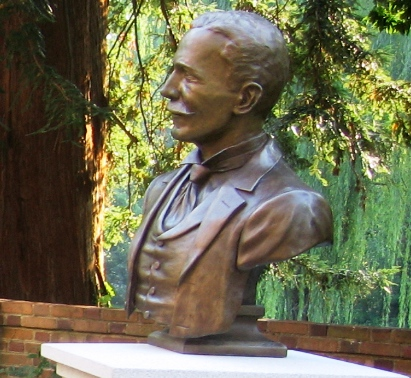
Flowers, said to be left by the Sevens, occasionally adorn this sculpture of President Lyon Gardiner Tyler located in W&M's Tyler Family Garden.

The school was reopened in 1888 by the newly appointed president, Lyon Gardiner Tyler. By 1891, The most legendary Society was reestablished and led by Tyler. Tyler also assembled a teaching staff that included professors Hugh S. Bird, Charles E. Bishop, Van F. Garrett, J. Lesslie Hall, Thomas J. Stubbs, and Lyman B. Wharton. Dubbed the "Seven Wise Men" by students, Tyler and the six professors are credited with reviving William & Mary and transforming the College into a modern-day university.

By the beginning of the 20th century, the Sevens had resurfaced. In 1939, the group publicly declared themselves to be “the only secret society of the College of William and Mary" Other groups, namely The 13s, Alphas, and Flat Hats, were highly selective student clubs that would later be revived as secret societies.

== Symbols ==
In chartering the College of William & Mary, founding benefactors King William III and Queen Mary II of England sought to establish "a certain place of universal study" to be led by "one President, six Masters or Professors." Together these seven individuals would be known simply as the Society. In 1729, after the full installation of the College’s "departments" (a president and six professors), corporate authority of William & Mary was transferred from the College’s surviving trustees to the seven-member Society. The group served as the governing body for the university – ensuring William & Mary’s continuous wellbeing and future prosperity.

A seven motif appears elsewhere on the campus. The Royal Charter instructs chancellors to serve seven year terms. The Sunken Gardens area is crossed with seven brick pathways. Seven buildings surround the gardens- Washington Hall, Ewell Hall, McGlothlin-Street Hall, the Christopher Wren building, Chancellors Hall, Tucker Hall, and James Blair Hall. Of the lodge buildings, housing in the middle of campus traditionally held by seniors (until they were knocked down in 2016 for the construction of the Integrated Wellness Center), seven were used for housing.

== Notable members ==
- Lawrence W. l’Anson – Chief Justice, Virginia Supreme Court
- H. Westcott "Scotty" Cunningham – first president of Christopher Newport University
- Arthur "Art" Matsu – professional football player and W&M's first Asian-American student
- Walter J. Zable – leading global businessman, philanthropist; namesake of W&M's Zable Stadium

== See also ==
- I Am the College of William and Mary (1945 poem)
- Secret societies at the College of William & Mary
- Collegiate secret societies in North America
