= Sneeze Achiu =

American football player (1902–1989)

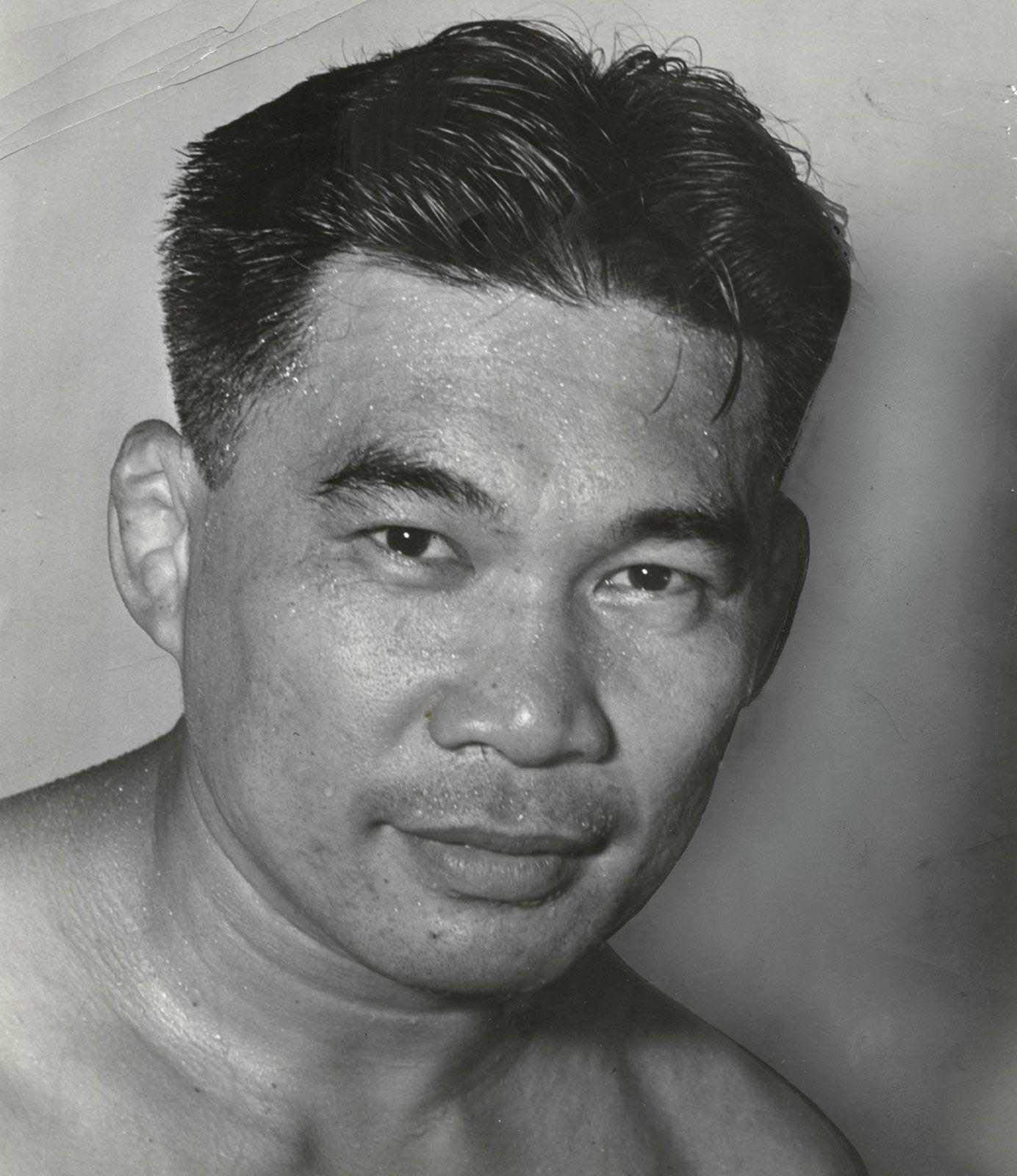
- Achiu at the University of Dayton (c. 1922–1925)

No. 3, 6
- Position: Halfback

Personal information
- Born: August 3, 1902; Honolulu, Territory of Hawaii
- Died: March 21, 1989 (aged 86); Eugene, Oregon, U.S.
- Listed height: 5 ft 8 (Note: Reported as 5 ft 4 in (1.63 m) in the 1926 Daytonian.) in (1.73 m)
- Listed weight: 169 (Note: Reported as 150 lb (68 kg) in The Washington Post and 155 lb (70 kg) in the 1926 Daytonian. Si Burick reported that he was 145 lb (66 kg) at the University of Dayton, but 175 lb (79 kg) during his wrestling days.) lb (77 kg)

Career information
- High school: Saint Louis School (HI)
- College: Dayton

Career history
- Dayton Triangles (1927–1928)

Awards and highlights
- University of Dayton Athletic Hall of Fame (1974)

Career statistics
- Games played: 11
- Games started: 5
- Stats at Pro Football Reference

Other information
- Resting place: Springfield Memorial Garden (Springfield, Oregon)
- Known for: Being the first Asian and Native Hawaiian player in the NFL
- Spouses: Fay Kingsbury; Susan McKinney
- Children: 1

Walter Tin Kit "Sneeze" Achiu (/ɑːˈtʃuː/ ah-CHOO; August 3, 1902 – March 21, 1989) was an American athlete and the first person of Asian descent and the first Native Hawaiian to play in the National Football League (NFL). He had a successful four-sport collegiate career at the University of Dayton, after which Achiu played two seasons with the NFL's Dayton Triangles. He mostly played halfback, but served as kicker, defensive back, and return specialist as well. Following his football career, Achiu spent the next thirty years as a wrestler, mostly on the West Coast and in the Miami Valley. He headlined a number of fights and served as a referee until at least the late 1950s.

Born to a Chinese father and a Native Hawaiian mother in Honolulu, Achiu excelled at sports during his time in high school and college-preparatory schooling. He was encouraged to attend the University of Dayton by an older schoolmate, where his talent in four sports – football, baseball, wrestling, and track – earned him national attention. Walter Camp, widely regarded as the Father of American Football, described Achiu as one of the most talented running backs in the game. Achiu was highly regarded for his "snakelike" running style, impressive speed, and seemingly outsized blocking skill despite his small stature.

Throughout both his football and wrestling careers, Achiu faced persistent racial discrimination. He was compared to a caged animal by a Wisconsin newspaper before a game with the Green Bay Packers. While on the Triangles, Achiu carried documents listing him as "Hawaiian-American-Caucasian" so that he would not be segregated from his team while on the road. Later in life, Achiu remained involved with his alma mater and was inducted into the University of Dayton Athletic Hall of Fame in 1974.

== Early life ==
Walter Tin Kit Achiu was born on August 3, 1902, in Honolulu, Territory of Hawaii, to Julia (née Kaumealaniʻikanuʻu Paʻanui) and Leong Achiu. (Note: The surname Achiu was originally spelled Ahchew.) Leong was born in Shanghai, China, then ruled by the Qing dynasty, and traveled to the United States at 16 to look for gold during the California gold rush. Two years later, Leong moved to Hawaii and became a rice farmer, marrying Julia, a Native Hawaiian woman. Walter was the third youngest of their ten children.

In Honolulu, Achiu was a student at McKinley High School and the Kamehameha Schools. Afterward, he attended Saint Louis College (now known as the Saint Louis School), a Catholic college-preparatory school run by the Society of Mary. While at Kamehameha and Saint Louis, he was known as an excellent athlete. At Kamehameha, he was a star football player and played halfback for the All-Hawaii football team for two years.

Though he also played some baseball, Achiu's achievements were considered highest in track, described by one newspaper as seeming to be "one of the fastest men ever developed on the [Hawaiian] islands". During track events, he was described by the Honolulu Star-Bulletin as "the big ground gainer on the Kamehameha team" and compared to a catapult. In an interview with the sports journalist Si Burick, Achiu recounted that a friend of his from grammar school had recommended that Achiu should attend the Society of Mary–run University of Dayton like he was.

== College career ==
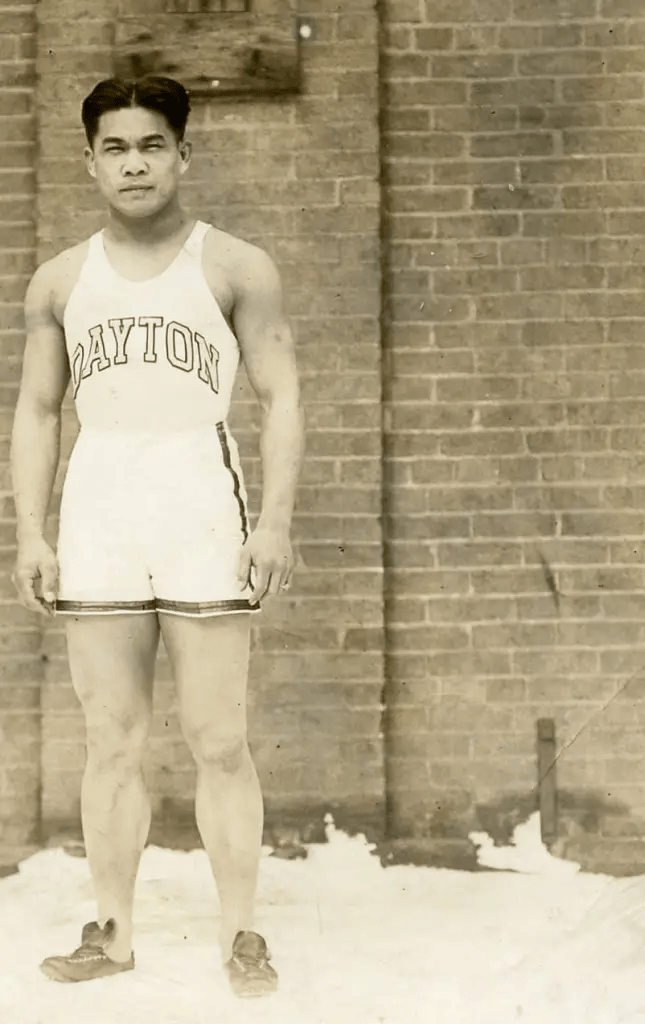
Achiu in his track uniform at the University of Dayton

In 1922, Achiu began attending the University of Dayton and joined its sports team, the Dayton Flyers. When his teammates had difficulty discerning how to pronounce his last name, he reportedly told them: "Sneeze it and you'll get it", earning him his nickname "Sneeze". (Note: Also reported as: "If you sneeze, you got it.") Achiu earned a national reputation as a standout four-sport athlete in football, baseball, wrestling, and track, earning nine varsity letters.

Achiu excelled particularly at football in college and earned attention playing there. During his freshman year, he started as the team's halfback, though also played defensive back and kicker. That year, he made a name for himself as a punt returner. He was singled out for a game-winning field goal against Carnegie Tech and his performance during a shutout game against the University of Cincinnati.

During his career at the university, Achiu was considered the most fun player to watch. The Dayton Daily News described him as "the greatest drawing card in the history of the school and also the most popular performer with the fans". He recounted that during his first year playing football, games only had around fifty attendees standing behind a rope, playing on a gravel field with no grass. By the time he left, the school had built a 10,000-seat stadium.

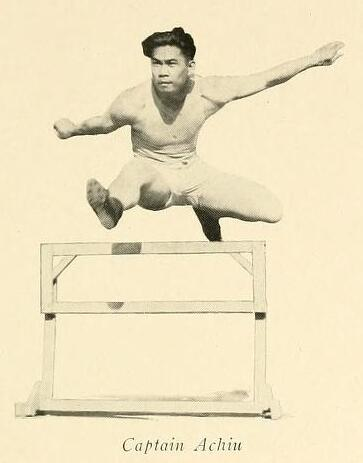
Achiu as captain of the track team (1926)

As a runner, Achiu matched the national indoor records in the 40-, 50-, and 60-yard (Note: 37, 46, and 55 meters, respectively.) dashes and had a ten-second 100-yard (91 m) dash. He also participated in the 400-yard (370 m) and one-mile (1.6 km) relays. As a baseball player, Achiu was an outfielder who was notable for his speed on the field. In 1926, his teammates elected him captain, and the following year he worked as an athletic trainer and manager for the football team.

Walter Camp, widely seen as the "Father of American Football", described Achiu as one of the "great backs" of the game. He was a strong runner and notable for his unusual sidestep approach – described as "snakelike" and "dazzling" – and speed, which caused him to be in heavy coverage regularly. He was a fairly strong passer, but highly regarded for his blocking, which seemed to outpace his relatively small frame. In 1925, he won honorable mention All-America honors. The same year, since he was ineligible to play football the following year, Achiu expressed an interest in collecting other Hawaiian football players who had honed their skills in college and putting together a team. He also received several offers from Hawaiian high schools to return and coach their teams following his graduation in Dayton.

Achiu succeeded academically in college as well, working with the Monogram and Engineers Clubs. He graduated from the University of Dayton in 1927 with a degree in electrical engineering and began work for Delco-Remy. Upon graduation, the university described him as "one of our most versatile and proficient athletes" who was "deadly with the club in the diamond pastime [and] a ten second man in the hundred".

== Professional career ==
=== National Football League ===
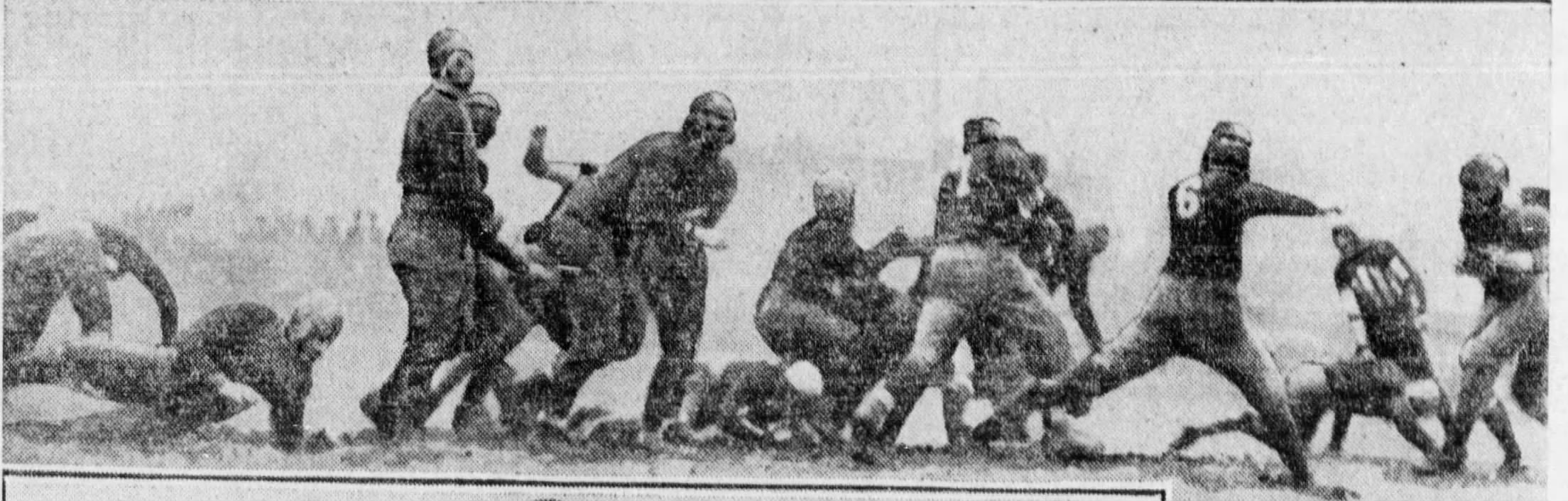
The Dayton Triangles facing off against the Frankford Yellow Jackets in 1928

During their 1927 season, Achiu began playing for the now-defunct Dayton Triangles in the National Football League (NFL). He was the first person of Asian heritage to play in the league, as well as the first of Hawaiian descent. Achiu started three games and played in seven of the eight season matches. The Triangles won one game, lost six, and tied another. The following season, Achiu played four games, starting two. The following season, the Triangles lost all seven games of the season.

During his tenure both in college and the NFL, Achiu was primarily used as a halfback and defensive back. He played over half a dozen other positions though, including kicker, punter, return specialist, wingback, and end.

=== Professional wrestling ===
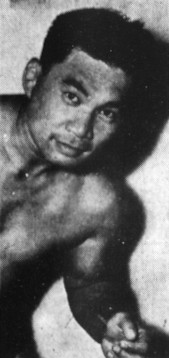
Achiu in a wrestling promo, c. 1938

Achiu later became a well-known professional wrestler. At his height, he was wrestling two matches a night, six days a week. He was a regular opponent of Gorgeous George, whose "flamboyant self-promoting style" influenced both Muhammad Ali and James Brown. As a fighter, George tended to skirt the rules, but Achiu retaliated with his signature approach to the sleeper hold. This approach applied "clawlike pressure" to the nerves of the neck and left George either drowsy or unconscious.

Achiu did most of his wrestling on the West Coast, though he maintained a strong reputation as a fighter in the Miami Valley, headlining shows at Memorial Hall, as well as in Troy, Piqua, and Xenia. By the early 1950s, Achiu was also refereeing wrestling matches and was known as an accomplished wrestler and a master of jiu-jitsu. He continued to wrestle into the late 1950s.

=== Discrimination ===
Despite having found "an oasis of acceptance" during his university years, throughout his professional career Achiu faced racial discrimination. During a promotional stunt for a game in New York City, the Triangles were billed as being a "Team of Immigrants". Before a game against the Green Bay Packers, the Appleton Post Crescent described the team as a "League of Nations outfit" that had "borrowed its uniforms from the wild zebras of Africa and [...] gathered players from the ends of the earth". The paper compared Achiu in particular to a zoo animal, calling him "the only Chinese player in captivity".

Even during his time at the University of Dayton, Achiu had several nicknames aside from "Sneeze", including "the Chinaman", "the Oriental Flash", "the Almond-Eyed Streak", and "the Lad From the Land of the Ukes". When Achiu traveled during his football days, his race was listed in documents as "Hawaiian-American-Caucasian", which likely helped him avoid being segregated from the other members of the team off-field. In the 1950s, while in El Paso, Texas, a man approached Achiu and his white wife at a restaurant and asked her: "Couldn't you find a white man?"

== Final years and death ==
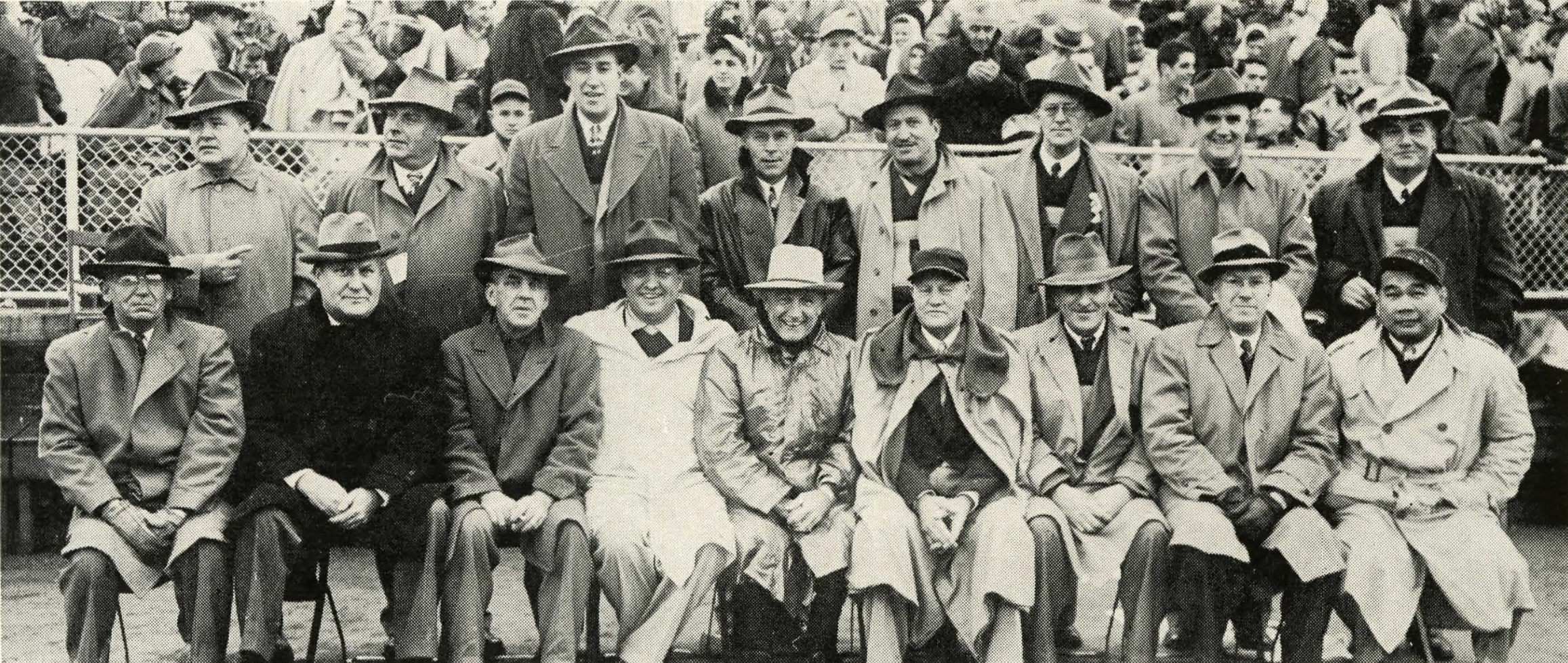
Achiu (bottom row, far right) with the 1925 Flyers in 1950

Achiu remained involved with his alma mater following his departure from the NFL. In 1947, he worked with his former coach Harry Baujan to organize a football game in Honolulu between the University of Dayton and the University of Hawaiʻi. Three years later, he returned to Dayton for a homecoming game in honor of the 25th anniversary of their 1925 season.

After retiring in Oregon, Achiu had health problems for the rest of his life. He died on March 21, 1989, at the age of 86. He is buried at Springfield Memorial Garden in Springfield, Oregon, next to his wife Susan who died ten years later.

== Personal life ==
Achiu was married twice. His first marriage was to Fay (née Kingsbury), with whom he had a daughter, Elana, in 1941. His second marriage was to Susan (née McKinney).

Aside from his athletic career, Achiu was also a crooner, once considering giving up wrestling altogether to do so professionally. When the Detroit-based promoter Adam Weissmuller received word from Achiu that he was considering quitting wrestling, he reminded Achiu that it was "his chief forte". Achiu responded: "Perhaps you do not know, Adam, but I have been offered a job crooning over a Chinese programme on the Coast." The response ran in the University of Dayton's alumni newsletter, describing Achiu as "wrestling's first holdout and its first crooner".

== Legacy ==
In 1974, Achiu was inducted into the University of Dayton's Athletics Hall of Fame with his childhood friend Augie Cabrinha. In 2023, "Sneeze Achiu" won an online poll for the "Greatest Name in Sports" out of 2,048 different entries, beating out names like "Amillion Buggs", "Scientific Mapp", and "Rowdy Beers".
