= Alfred McCray =

American judge

Biographical details
- Born: May 2, 1881; Warren, Ohio, U.S.
- Died: May 20, 1928 (aged 47); Dayton, Ohio, U.S.

Playing career

Football
- 1902–1904: Cincinnati

Coaching career (HC unless noted)

Football
- 1905: Marshall
- 1909: Antioch
- 1914–1916: Dayton

Basketball
- 1915–1917: Dayton

Head coaching record
- Overall: 15–9 (football, excluding Antioch); 19–5 (basketball)

Alfred McCray (May 2, 1881 – May 20, 1928) was an American football and basketball coach, a college football referee and common pleas court judge in Ohio during the early 20th century.

== Football playing career ==
McCray played college football at the University of Cincinnati from 1902 to 1904, serving as team captain during his senior season

== College coaching career ==
=== Marshall ===
McCray served as the head football coach at Marshall University in Huntington, West Virginia in 1905, leading the team to an 6–2 record.

=== Antioch College ===
McCray served as the head football coach at Antioch College in Yellow Springs, Ohio in 1909.

=== University of Dayton ===
McCray coached the football team (1914–1916) and basketball (1915–1917) at the University of Dayton.

== Officiating ==
McCray served as an National Collegiate Athletic Association-registered official during the 1915 college football season.

== Legal career ==
McCray served as a Judge of Common Pleas in Dayton, Ohio until his death in 1928.

== Head coaching record ==
=== Football ===
| Year | Team | Overall | Conference | Standing | Bowl/playoffs |
|---|---|---|---|---|---|
Marshall Thundering Herd (Independent) (1905)
| 1905 | Marshall | 6–2 | | | |
| Marshall: | | 6–2 | | | |
Dayton Flyers (Independent) (1914–1916)
| 1914 | Dayton | 2–2 | | | |
| 1915 | Dayton | 3–2 | | | |
| 1916 | Dayton | 4–3 | | | |
| Dayton: | | 9–7 | | | |
| Total: | | | | | |
