= Al Mahrt =

American football player and coach (1893–1970)

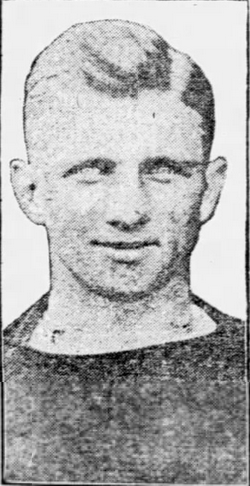

Profile
- Positions: Quarterback, Tackle

Personal information
- Born: October 12, 1893; Dayton, Ohio, U.S.
- Died: June 24, 1970 (aged 76); Chillicothe, Ohio, U.S.
- Listed height: 6 ft 1 in (1.85 m)
- Listed weight: 190 lb (86 kg)

Career information
- College: Dayton

Career history

Playing
- 1913–1914: St. Mary’s Cadets
- 1915: Dayton Gym-Cadets
- 1916–1917: Dayton Triangles
- 1919–1922: Dayton Triangles

Coaching
- 1914–1915: Dayton
- 1915: Dayton Triangles
- 1917–1919: Dayton

Awards and highlights
- Second-team All-Pro (1920); 3x Dayton city champion (1913, 1914, 1915)
- Stats at Pro Football Reference

Other information
- Military career
- Allegiance: United States
- Branch: U.S. Army
- Conflicts: World War I

Alphonse Herman Mahrt (October 12, 1893 – June 24, 1970) was a professional football player and coach who played his entire career with the Dayton Triangles of the "Ohio League" and later the National Football League (NFL). He was an early proponent of the forward pass after the revolutionary play was added to an extensive list of regulations to college football in 1906. By 1911 when most of the pass restrictions were lifted, Mahrt debuted as regular back on St. Mary’s Institute’s (now the University of Dayton) varsity football team. Mahrt discovered that spinning the throw of the ball increased accuracy and distance, establishing an aerial offense against such teams as Xavier University and Otterbein College.

In 1913 Mahrt switched to the St. Mary’s Cadets, the precursor of the future Dayton Triangles, he was also named the team's captain. Mahrt returned to St. Mary’s varsity in 1914, and captained the team. That season a 70-yard spiral to Babe Zimmerman against Ohio Northern University set a school record. Aside from his college career, Al continued to play for the Cadets. From 1913 until 1915 the team won the Dayton City Championship every year. In 1914 Mahrt was injured through most of the season, however in 1915 he was named the team's coach. In 1918, Mahrt joined the United States Army and served in World War I.

In 1920, Al led all passers in the American Professional Football Association (renamed the NFL in 1922), completing 28 aerials for 591 yards. He would also throw 7 touchdowns on the year. He was runner-up in 1921 completing 29 that were good for 452 yards. He was chosen to the 1920 All-Pro team, which placed him as a second-team quarterback. He retired from the Triangles after the 1922 season.

After his football career, Mahrt worked at Dayton Brewing Co, Dayton Metal Products, and Smart Co. He then worked with Mead Corporation (later MeadWestvaco, now WestRock) for nearly 30 years before retiring in 1959. When he retired he was the vice president of the corporation. Smurfit Westrock's Mahrt paper mill in Cottonton, Alabama, was named in Mr. Mahrt's honor.
