= Dayton Triangles =

American football team in Dayton, Ohio

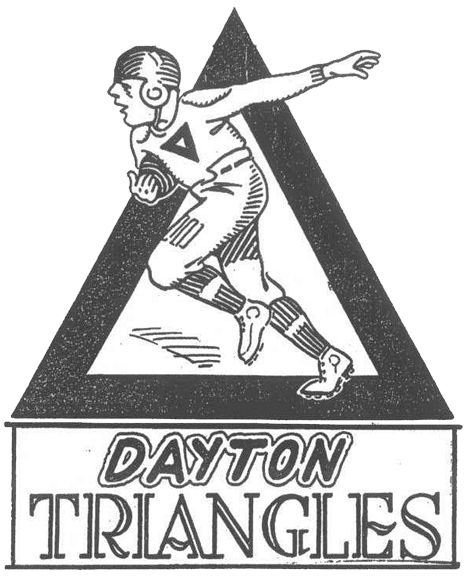
Logo

General information
- Founded: 1913
- Stadium: Westwood Field (1916); Triangle Park (1917–1929)
- Headquartered: Dayton, Ohio, United States
- Colors: Navy, white

Personnel
- Owners: Dayton Engineering Laboratories Company; Dayton Metal Products Company; Domestic Engineering Company
- Head coach: Louis Clark (1913–1914); Al Mahrt (1915); Bud Talbott (1916–1917, 1919–1921); Greasy Neale (1918); Carl Storck (1922–1926); Lou Mahrt (1927); Faye Abbott (1928–1929)

Team history
- St. Mary's Cadets (1913–1914); Dayton Gym-Cadets (1915); Dayton Triangles (1916–1929)

League / conference affiliations
- Ohio League (1913–1919); National Football League (1920–1929)

The Dayton Triangles were an original franchise of the American Professional Football Association (now the National Football League (NFL)) in 1920. The Triangles were based in Dayton, Ohio, and took their nickname from their home field, Triangle Park, which was located at the confluence of the Great Miami and Stillwater Rivers in north Dayton. They were the longest-lasting traveling team in the NFL (1920–1929), and the last such "road team" until the Dallas Texans in 1952, who, coincidentally, descended from the Dayton franchise.

The Texans players and assets were moved to Baltimore in 1953, and then to Indianapolis in 1983, where they now operate as the Colts, just 117 miles (188 km) west of their origin.

== Origins ==
The original Dayton Triangles members first began playing together as basketball players at St. Mary's College, now the University of Dayton, from 1908 until 1912. After graduation, the players organized a basketball team of alumni, students, and other local athletes. They went by the name of the St. Mary's Cadets. The Cadets claimed the title of "World Basketball Champions" by defeating the Buffalo German Ramblers.

In the fall of 1913, the St. Marys Cadets organized a football team. The team was coached by Louis Clark, who coached the St. Mary's college football team as well. Al Mahrt was elected team captain. The team finished its first season with a 7–0 record and won the Dayton City Championship. They also won the Southern Ohio Championship by defeating the Cincinnati Celts 27–0 at Redland Park. The team won a second city championship in 1914, despite injuries to Al Mahrt and Babe Zimmerman. In 1915 the team changed its name to the Dayton Gym-Cadets after their presumed sponsors, the Dayton Gymnastic Club. That season saw Al Mahrt take over as the team's coach. The team only lost one game that season, to the Columbus Panhandles. It also won its third city championship.

== 1916–1919 ==
The team was reorganized in 1916 as a recreational football team from among the employees of three downtown Dayton factories: the Dayton Engineering Laboratories Company (or Delco), the Dayton Metal Products Company, and the Domestic Engineering Company (now called Delco-Light). Carl Storck, who later served as treasurer of the NFL and as acting league president from 1939 to 1941, co-sponsored the Dayton Cadets and used players recruited from the three factories to fill out the team roster. Storck would later become the team's manager, while Bud Talbott, a Walter Camp All-American tackle and team captain at Yale University, was named the team's coach. The team's name was also changed to the Dayton Triangles that season.

In 1916, the Triangles went 9–1, defeating teams from Cincinnati, Detroit, Toledo and Pittsburgh. The Canton Bulldogs, with the legendary Jim Thorpe in the line-up, claimed the "Ohio League" Championship after their win over the Massillon Tigers. The Triangles challenged the Bulldogs to a game on December 10, 1916, but the game was never played. The following season saw the Triangles move into their new park, Triangle Park. The team's 1917 campaign was successful. The team went 6–0–2 that season. The Triangles were able to score 188 points and gave up only 13 to their opponents.

=== 1918 Championship ===
1918 saw the United States entry in World War I, as well as the devastating Spanish flu pandemic. While the Triangles lost players to military service, they also had many kept home with regular jobs in industries deemed essential to the war effort and, along with the few other teams still playing, far less competition for the talent pool. This allowed the Triangles to keep a team on the field and beat what few representative teams remained and eventually claiming an Ohio League Championship. The Triangle player-coach that season was Earle "Greasy" Neale, since Bud Talbott joined the army. During their championship run, the Triangles defeated future NFL teams, the Toledo Maroons, Hammond Pros, Columbus Panhandles and Detroit Heralds. The Triangles went 8–0–0 in 1918, one of two known teams to have collected a perfect record of more than five games that year, the other being the Buffalo Niagaras, whose 6–0–0 record was collected as a result of playing only teams from Buffalo and who built their team on many of the players left out of work because of the Ohio League teams' suspension. In 1919, they followed up their championship with a season record of 4–2–1.

== National Football League (NFL) era ==
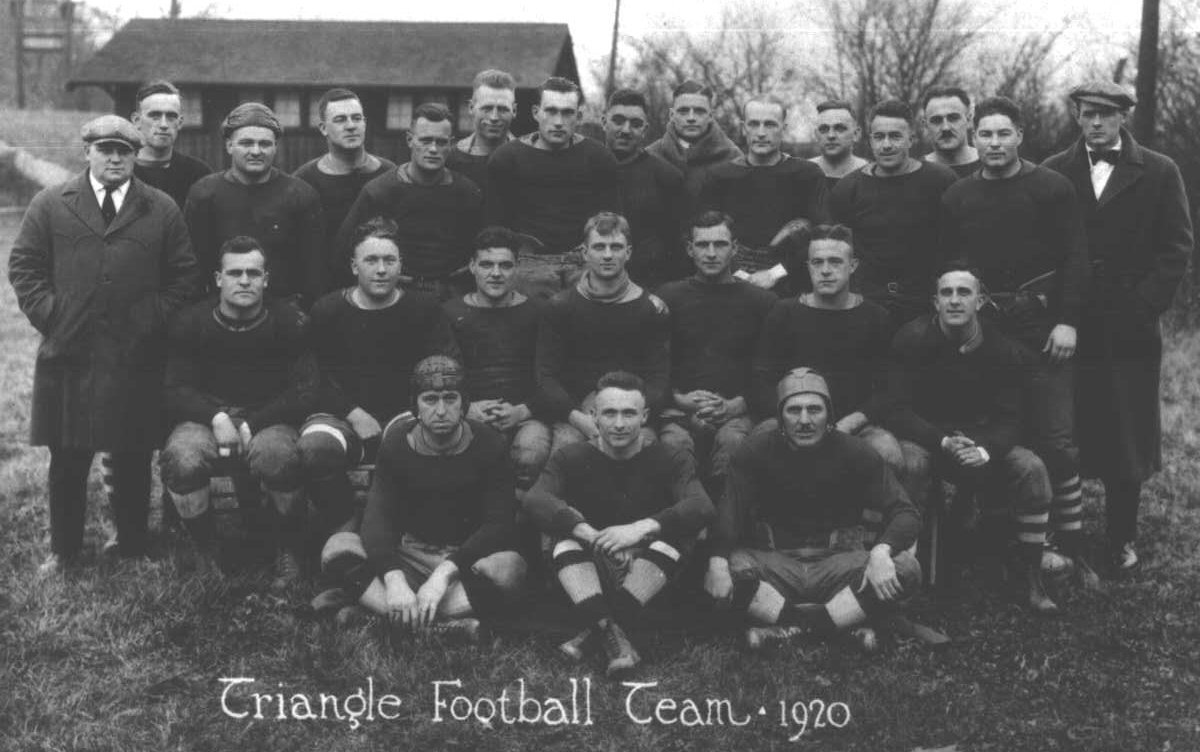
A team photograph of the Dayton Triangles, 1920

At the first meetings held on August 20, 1920, and September 17, 1920, at Ralph Hay's Hupmobile dealership located in Canton, Ohio, the Triangles were represented by their manager Carl Storck as they became charter members of the new league called the American Professional Football Association (APFA), until 1922 when it was renamed the National Football League. During the latter meeting, Jim Thorpe was unanimously elected as the new league's president. Also at this meeting, a membership fee of $100 ($1,924 in 2025) per team was established, however George Halas stated that none of the charter teams ever paid it.

On October 3, 1920, the Triangles won what could be considered the very first APFA/NFL game, with a 14–0 defeat of the Columbus Panhandles at Triangle Park. The high point of the Triangles' 1920 season was a 20–20 tie at Triangle Park with Thorpe's Canton Bulldogs; it was the first time a team had scored three touchdowns on the Bulldogs since 1915. Trailing the Triangles, 20–14, Thorpe nailed two late field goals to tie the score. Six games into the season, the Triangles remained undefeated (4–0–2) but in the final three games lost twice to the eventual league champion, the Akron Pros, ending 1920 with a 5–2–2 mark.

== Decline ==
In 1922, the other teams in the NFL were recruiting and signing top college players from around the country; however Dayton continued to use mainly local players. This marked a decline in the team's performance, and the Triangles ceased being competitive in the NFL. Because of their poor showing on the field, the Triangles were not able to draw crowds for home games: Triangle Park, with a seating capacity of 5,000, rarely saw that many fans. Soon, the combination of poor home gates and the lure of $2,500 guarantees to play at larger venues (like Wrigley Field, Comiskey Park and the Polo Grounds), made the Triangles primarily a traveling team.

By the late twenties, Dayton was one of the league's doormats, winning just five of their 51 NFL contests from 1923 through 1929. Only the revenues from playing on the road kept them afloat. Also around this time, the NFL began shaking off its roots in the mid-sized Midwestern cities that had been the heartland of pro football in the late 19th and early 20th centuries. The Triangles were one of only three original NFL teams (along with the Bears and Cardinals) to survive the 1920s, and the only team from the Ohio League to survive past 1926. Nevertheless, by then it was apparent that Dayton was no longer large enough to support a team in the burgeoning league. Finally, on July 12, 1930, a Brooklyn-based syndicate headed by Bill Dwyer and Jack Depler bought the Triangles and moved them to Brooklyn as the Brooklyn Dodgers. Depler became the Dodgers' head coach, and stocked the roster with players from the NFL's Orange Tornadoes, where he had previously been player-coach. Although the Dodgers operated under the Triangles franchise, they were essentially an expansion team. The roster was dominated by former Tornadoes. Many of the 1929 Triangles could not afford to move to Brooklyn due to the Great Depression, and those who did were mostly relegated to the bench.

== Lineage ==
Due to numerous transactions over the years, the Triangles have a tenuous connection to a current NFL franchise, the Indianapolis Colts.

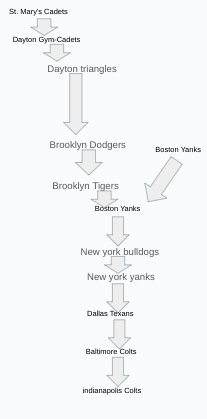
Triangles to Indianapolis Colts flow chart

The Dodgers were renamed the Brooklyn Tigers in 1944, and merged with the Boston Yanks franchise for the 1945 season due to player shortages. In 1946, Brooklyn owner Dan Topping jumped to the AAFC to become owner of the new league's New York Yankees. The NFL canceled the Tigers franchise and awarded the Tigers' player contracts to the Boston Yanks.

In 1949, the Yanks moved to New York and became the New York Bulldogs, while the AAFC Yankees merged with the Brooklyn Dodgers and played as the Brooklyn-New York Yankees. When the AAFC merged with the NFL in 1950, the Yankees players were divided between the NFL's two New York teams, the Giants and the Bulldogs. Shortly before the 1950 season, the Bulldogs were renamed the New York Yanks.

Due to heavy financial losses, the Yanks were sold back to the NFL in 1952. The Yanks' assets and player contracts were awarded to a group from Texas, who moved them to Dallas for the 1952 season as the Dallas Texans.

The Texans were again sold back to the NFL midway through the season. Before the 1953 season, an ownership group in Baltimore was awarded an expansion franchise, the (new) Baltimore Colts. As part of the deal, the new Colts were awarded the remains of the Texans organization, including their player contracts. The Colts moved to Indianapolis in 1984 and still play there today.

In spite of the seemingly unbroken continuity of the franchises that began with the Triangles in 1913 and the Boston Yanks from 1944, the NFL considers the Colts to be a 1953 expansion team, not a continuation of the Triangles or any other franchise. Likewise, the Colts do not claim the legacy of the Triangles or their successors as part of their history. If the Colts were counted as descended from the Triangles, they own the record for the longest post-season drought with 38 seasons, with zero post season appearances in the NFL from 1920 until playing for and winning the NFL championship in 1958.

== Teams named after the football Triangles ==
During the 1970s, the Dayton Triangles Soccer Club revived the name and enjoyed some success and recognition as a successful youth (and later semi-pro) soccer club. Like the football team, they took their name from the same city park and played an important role in development of soccer in the Miami Valley.

In 1973, the Dayton Triangles RFC club was founded. Like the aforementioned soccer club, this team also took its name from the original football team and city park. Through various amalgamations over the years, the club is still active under the name of the Dayton Area Rugby Club.

== Pro Football Hall of Famers and notable players ==
Dayton Triangles Hall of Famers
Players
No.	Name	Position	Tenure	Inducted
—	Greasy Neale	End	1918	1969

Dayton Triangles notable players
Players
No.	Name	Position	Tenure	Inducted
—	Arthur Matsu	QB	1928	N/A
—	Sneeze Achiu	RB/DB	1927–1928	N/A

== Season-by-season ==
Season	Team	League	Regular season				Postseason results	Refs.
Season	Team	League	Finish	W	L	T	Postseason results	Refs.
Dayton St. Mary's Cadets
1913	1913	Ohio	—	7	0	0	Named Ohio City champions Defeated Cincinnati Celts for Ohio League South Division Championship	
1914	1914	Ohio	—	5	4	0	Named Ohio City champions	
Dayton Gym-Cadets
1915	1915	Ohio	—	7	1	1	Named Ohio City champions	
Dayton Triangles
1916	1916	Ohio	4th	9	1	0	The Ohio League did not have playoffs	
1917	1917	Ohio	—	6	0	2	The Ohio League did not have playoffs	
1918	1918	Ohio	1st	8	0	0	Named Ohio League champions	
1919	1919	Ohio	—	5	2	1	The Ohio League did not have playoffs	
1920	1920	APFA	6th	5	2	2	The APFA did not have playoffs	
1921	1921	APFA	8th	4	4	1	The APFA did not have playoffs	
1922	1922	NFL	7th	4	3	1	The NFL did not have playoffs until 1932	
1923	1923	NFL	16th	1	6	1	The NFL did not have playoffs until 1932	
1924	1924	NFL	13th	2	6	0	The NFL did not have playoffs until 1932	
1925	1925	NFL	16th	0	7	1	The NFL did not have playoffs until 1932	
1926	1926	NFL	16th	1	4	1	The NFL did not have playoffs until 1932	
1927	1927	NFL	10th	1	6	1	The NFL did not have playoffs until 1932	
1928	1928	NFL	10th	0	7	0	The NFL did not have playoffs until 1932	
1929	1929	NFL	12th	0	6	0	The NFL did not have playoffs until 1932	
Totals				W	L	T		
Totals				12	4	0	Dayton St. Mary's Cadets season record (1913–1914)	
Totals				7	1	1	Dayton Gym-Cadets season record (1915)	
Totals				46	54	11	Dayton Triangles season record (1916–1929)	
Totals				65	59	12	All-time season record (1913–1929)	

== Notes ==
Achievements
Preceded by Canton Bulldogs; 1916 & 1917	Ohio League Champions; Dayton Triangles; 1918	Succeeded by Canton Bulldogs; 1919
