= 1920 Cleveland Tigers (NFL) season =

Sports season

1920 Cleveland Tigers season
- Owner: Jimmy O'Donnell
- Head coach: Stan Cofall and Al Pierotti
- Home stadium: Dunn Field

Results
- Record: 2–4–2 Overall; 1–4–2 (AFPA)
- League place: 10th AFPA

The 1920 Cleveland Tigers season was the franchise's inaugural season in the American Professional Football Association (APFA) and fifth total as an American football team. The Tigers entered the season coming off a 5-win, 2-loss, 2-tie (5–2–2) record in 1919. After the 1919 season, several representatives from the Ohio League, a loose organization of professional football teams, wanted to form a new professional league; thus, the APFA was created.

The Tigers opened the season with a 0–0 tie against the Dayton Triangles, en route to a 2–4–2 record, which placed the team 10th in the final standings. In week 8, the Tigers scored 7 points against the Akron Pros, which was the only points Akron allowed all season. The sportswriter Bruce Copeland compiled the 1920 All-Pro list, but no players from the Tigers were on it. As of 2012, no player from the 1920 Tigers roster has been enshrined in the Pro Football Hall of Fame.

== Offseason ==
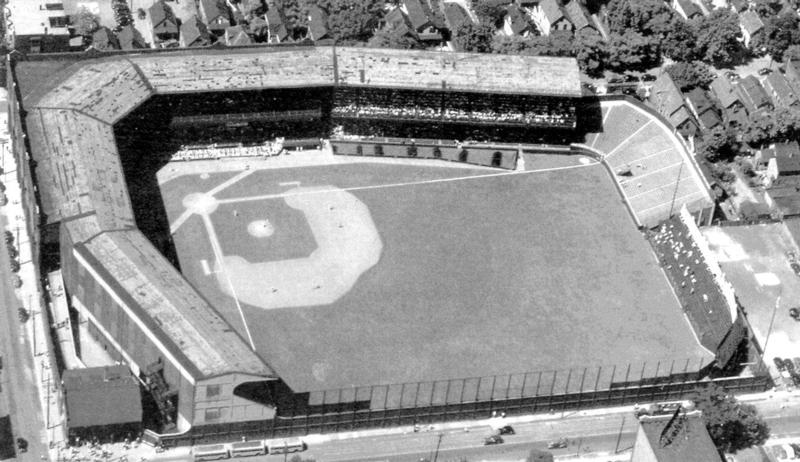
Dunn Field, the home stadium of the 1920 Cleveland Tigers

The Cleveland Tigers finished 5–2–2 in their 1919 season in the Ohio League. After the 1919 season, representatives of four Ohio League teams—the Canton Bulldogs, the Tigers, the Dayton Triangles, and the Akron Pros—called a meeting on August 20, 1920, to discuss the formation of a new league. At the meeting, they tentatively agreed on a salary cap and pledged not to sign college players or players already under contract with other teams. They also agreed on a name for the circuit: the American Professional Football Conference. They then invited other professional teams to a second meeting on September 17.

At the second meeting, held at Bulldogs owner Ralph Hay's Hupmobile showroom in Canton, representatives of the Rock Island Independents, the Muncie Flyers, the Decatur Staleys, the Racine Cardinals, the Massillon Tigers, the Chicago Cardinals, and the Hammond Pros agreed to join the league. Representatives of the Buffalo All-Americans and Rochester Jeffersons could not attend the meeting, but sent letters to Hay asking to be included in the league. Team representatives changed the league's name slightly to the American Professional Football Association and elected officers, installing Jim Thorpe as president. Under the new league structure, teams created their schedules dynamically as the season progressed, so there were no minimum or maximum number of games needed to be played. Also, representatives of each team voted to determine the winner of the APFA trophy.

== Schedule ==
Game	Date	Opponent	Result	Record	Venue	Attendance	Recap	Sources
1	October 10	at Dayton Triangles	T 0–0	0–0–1	Triangle Park	4,000	Recap	
2	October 17	at Canton Bulldogs	L0–7	0–1–1	Lakeside Park	7,000	Recap	
3	October 24	at Akron Pros	L 0–7	0–2–1	League Park	5,000+	Recap	
4	October 31	Columbus Panhandles	W 7–0	1–2–1	Dunn Field	5,000	Recap	
5	November 7	Canton Bulldogs	L 0–18	1–3–1	Dunn Field	8,000	Recap	
6	November 14	Akron Pros	T 7–7	1–3–2	Dunn Field	8,000	Recap	
7	November 21	Toledo Maroons	W 14–7	2–3–2	Dunn Field	1,500	Recap	
8	November 28	at Buffalo All-Americans	L 0–7	2–4–2	Buffalo Baseball Park	5,000	Recap	
Note: Non-APFA teams in italics.

== Standings ==
1920 APFA standings
	W	L	T	PCT	DIV	DPCT	PF	PA	STK
Akron Pros†	8	0	3	1.000	6–0–3	1.000	151	7	T2
Decatur Staleys	10	1	2	.909	5–1–2	.833	164	21	T1
Buffalo All-Americans	9	1	1	.900	4–1–1	.800	258	32	T1
Chicago Cardinals	6	2	2	.750	3–2–1	.600	101	29	T1
Rock Island Independents	6	2	2	.750	4–2–1	.667	201	49	W1
Dayton Triangles	5	2	2	.714	4–2–2	.667	150	54	L1
Rochester Jeffersons	6	3	2	.667	0–1–0	.000	156	57	T1
Canton Bulldogs	7	4	2	.636	4–3–1	.571	208	57	W1
Detroit Heralds	2	3	3	.400	1–3–0	.250	53	82	T2
Cleveland Tigers	2	4	2	.333	1–4–2	.200	28	46	L1
Chicago Tigers	2	5	1	.286	1–5–1	.167	49	63	W1
Hammond Pros	2	5	0	.286	0–3–0	.000	41	154	L3
Columbus Panhandles	2	6	2	.250	0–5–0	.000	41	121	W1
Muncie Flyers	0	1	0	.000	0–1–0	.000	0	45	L1

† Awarded the Brunswick-Balke Collender Cup and named APFA Champions
by vote of league owners. Staleys claimed a co-title.

== Game summaries ==
=== Game 1: at Dayton Triangles ===
	1	2	3	4	Total
Tigers	0	0	0	0	0
Triangles	0	0	0	0	0

October 10, 1920, at Triangle Park

In their opening game of the 1920 season, the Tigers played the Dayton Triangles. The Triangles were coming off a historic game; it was the first match between two APFA teams. No team scored in this game, and it ended in a 0–0 tie.

=== Game 2: at Canton Bulldogs ===
	1	2	3	4	Total
Tigers	0	0	0	0	0
Bulldogs	7	0	0	0	7

October 17, 1920, at Lakeside Park

The Tigers next faced the Canton Bulldogs, which would be the Bulldogs' first APFA opponent. The Tigers lost 7–0 before a crowd of 7,000 people. The Bulldogs' offense had 15 first downs, and the only score of the game came when the Bulldogs' Ike Martin had a 7-yard touchdown run in the first quarter. Jim Thorpe of the Bulldogs, who would later be enshrined in the Pro Football Hall of Fame, made his season debut in the game, coming in as a substitute in the fourth quarter.

=== Game 3: at Akron Pros ===
	1	2	3	4	Total
Tigers	0	0	0	0	0
Pros	7	0	0	0	7

October 24, 1920, at League Park

The Akron Pros were the Tigers' next opponent. Playing in front of 6,000 fans, the game was called a "punting duel" by the Youngstown Vindicator. The only score came from a punt block by Akron's Bob Nash in the first quarter. Nash grabbed the ball from the Tigers' punter, Stan Cofall, on the 8-yard line and ran in for the score. With an extra point from Charlie Copley, the Pros defeated the Tigers 7–0 to keep their undefeated season alive. During the game, injuries for both teams occurred. Pollard of the Pros dislocated his right shoulder, and Tuffy Conn for the Tigers injured his right leg in the fourth quarter.

=== Game 4: vs. Columbus Panhandles ===
	1	2	3	4	Total
Panhandles	0	0	0	0	0
Tigers	0	7	0	0	7

October 31, 1920, at League Park

On Halloween the Tigers played against the Columbus Panhandles in front of 5,000 fans, The Tigers won 7–0. The lone score came from a rushing touchdown in the second quarter from Charlie Brickley. This was the eighth straight loss for the Panhandles, dating back to 1919, and the seventh straight without scoring. According to football historian Chris Willis, this loss for the Panhandles crushed the city of Columbus and made the Panhandles challenge lesser teams for the rest of the season.

=== Game 5: vs. Canton Bulldogs ===
	1	2	3	4	Total
Bulldogs	0	14	2	2	18
Tigers	0	0	0	0	0

November 7, 1920, at Dunn Field

Tigers' next game was played against the Canton Bulldogs, who were coming off their first loss of the season. Neither team scored in the first quarter, but the Bulldogs ran for two touchdowns in the second. Calac and Grigg had 6- and 15-yard rushing touchdowns. The Bulldogs' defense forced two safeties—one in the third and one in the fourth quarter—to win the game 18–0.

=== Game 6: vs. Akron Pros ===
	1	2	3	4	Total
Pros	0	7	0	0	7
Tigers	0	0	7	0	7

November 14, 1920, at Dunn Park, Cleveland, Ohio

In their second game of November, the Tigers had a rematch with the Pros. Playing in front of 8,000 fans, the Pros allowed their first and only points of the year from a 50-yard touchdown pass from Mark Devlin to Tuffy Conn and an extra point by Al Pierotti in the third quarter. Pollard had a 20-yard rushing touchdown in the second quarter and Copley made an extra point to tie the game at 7–7, making it the second tie of the season for the Tigers.

=== Game 7: vs. Toledo Maroons ===
	1	2	3	4	Total
Maroons	0	0	0	0	0
Tigers	7	0	0	7	14

November 21, 1920, at Dunn Field, Cleveland, Ohio

The Toledo Maroons were the Tigers' next opponent. The Maroons were an independent team but joined the APFA in 1922. Prior to this game, the Maroons did not score a point against an APFA tem all season, and that streak continued into this game. In the first quarter, Baston blocked a kick and ran it for a touchdown. He would later score the game's final points in the fourth as he caught a receiving touchdown from Pierotti. The final score of the game was a 14–0 victory for the Tigers.

=== Game 8: at Buffalo All-Americans ===
The Tigers close in on Buffalo left halfback Buck Gavin, who gained six yards in a sea of mud.

	1	2	3	4	Total
Tigers	0	0	0	0	0
All-Americans	0	0	7	0	7

November 28, 1920, at Buffalo Baseball Park

In their final game of the 1920 season, the Tigers played against the Buffalo All-Americans, who were coming off their first loss of the season. The Public Ledger called the game "scrappy"; most forward passes were blocked, and neither team's offense was productive. A total of 5,000 fans showed up to the game. The All-Americans had possession on the 5-yard line and the 1-foot line, but the Tigers' defense stopped them. The only score of the game came in the third quarter when Buffalo quarterback Oscar Anderson scored an 8-yard rushing touchdown going around end.

== Post-season ==
Due to several losses, the Tigers did not contend for the APFA trophy in 1920, a prize awarded by the league's owners to the league's best team at the end of the season. The Tigers' performance of 2–4–2 would be the team's best before folding in 1921. Sportswriter Bruce Copeland compiled the 1920 All Pro team, but no players made the list. As of 2012, no players from the 1920 Dayton Triangles were enshrined in the Pro Football Hall of Fame.

== Roster ==
The following saw action in at least one game for the 1920 Cleveland Tigers. The number of APFA games in which they appeared follows in parentheses.

Linemen

- Bert Baston (8)
- Harry Baujan (6)
- Tom Gormley (8)
- John Haggerty (5)
- Pat Herron (1)
- George Kerr (2)
- Phil Marshall (1)
- Ed O'Hearn (5)
- Irving Pearlman (8)
- Al Pierotti (5)
- Frank Rydzewski (3)
- Herb Sies (1)
- Joe Spagna (3)
- Ed Stahl (3)
- Claude Thornhill (8)
- Ray Trowbridge (3)
- Al Wesbecher (5)

Backs

- George Brickley (5)
- Jim Bryant (3)
- Stan Cofall (3)
- George Conn (6)
- Earl Cramer (7)
- Mark Devlin (4)
- Dinger Doane (4)
- Moon Ducote (1)
- Johnny Gilroy (2)
- Charlie Hastings (3)
- Joey Mattern (1)
- Jack O'Hearn (5)
- Leo Petree (2)
