= 1920 Akron Pros season =

Sports season

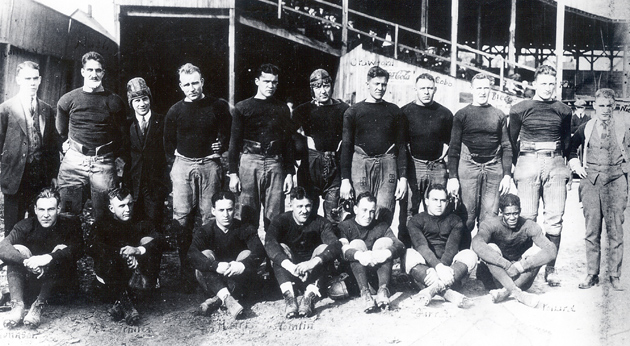
- The 1920 Akron Pros team
- Owner: Akron Exhibition Co. Charles Stahl
- President: Frank Nied, Art Ranney
- Head coach: Elgie Tobin
- Home stadium: League Park

Results
- Record: 8–0–3 overall 6–0–3 (APFA)
- Division place: 1st APFA (named champions)
- Playoffs: No playoffs until 1932

The 1920 Akron Pros season was the franchise's inaugural season with the American Professional Football Association (APFA) and twelfth total season as a team. The Pros entered the season coming off a 5–5 record in 1919 as the Akron Indians in the Ohio League. The Indians were sold to Art Ranney and Frank Nied, two businessmen, to help achieve a better record and crowd. Several representatives from the Ohio League wanted to form a new professional league; thus, the APFA was created.

Returning to the team for the 1920 season would be most of last year's team, including quarterback Fritz Pollard. The Pros also added end Bob Nash, who previously played for the Tigers, Al Garrett, and end Al Nesser of the famous Nesser brothers. They opened their regular season with a win over the Wheeling Stogies, en route to an 8–0–3 record. In week 11, the Pros traded Bob Nash, in the first trade in APFA history. A meeting was held by the APFA to determine a winner, and the Pros' season concluded with the team winning the Brunswick-Balke Collender Cup for finishing first place in the APFA. The Decatur Staleys and the Buffalo All-Americans laid claim to the title because of the number of wins each team had.

Rip King and Fritz Pollard were named first-team all APFA and Alf Cobb was named second-team all APFA by the Rock Island Argus. The Pros only allowed seven points all season, which was the lowest among all APFA teams. The 1920 Akron Pros were the first team in the history of the APFA to have an undefeated record, in that they were never defeated in a game.

Tied games were not counted in the standings until 1972: the Pros' 8-0-3 record would have been counted as an .864 percentage under current rules. In 2005, Pollard became the only player from the 1920 Akron Pros to be elected into the Professional Football Hall of Fame.

== Offseason ==
The Akron Pros, who were named the Akron Indians, finished 5–5 in their 1919 season in the Ohio League. The Indians lost money because of the constant poor performance; the team did not win an Ohio League Championship since 1914. The Indians was sold to Art Ranney and Frank Nied. The two changed the team name to the Akron Pros, as they hoped to achieve a better record and crowd.

Representatives of four Ohio League teams—the Canton Bulldogs, the Cleveland Tigers, the Dayton Triangles, and Ranney and Reid for the Pros—called a meeting on August 20, 1920, to discuss the formation of a new league. At the meeting, they tentatively agreed on a salary cap and pledged not to sign college players or players already under contract with other teams. They also agreed on a name for the circuit: the American Professional Football Conference. They then contacted other major professional teams and invited them to a meeting for September 17.

At that meeting, held at Bulldogs owner Ralph Hay's Hupmobile showroom in Canton, representatives of the Rock Island Independents, the Muncie Flyers, the Decatur Staleys, the Racine Cardinals, the Massillon Tigers, and the Hammond Pros agreed to join the league. Representatives of the Buffalo All-Americans and Rochester Jeffersons could not attend the meeting, but sent letters to Hay asking to be included in the league. Team representatives changed the league's name slightly to the American Professional Football Association and elected officers, installing Jim Thorpe as president. Under the new league structure, teams created their schedules dynamically as the season progressed, and representatives of each team voted to determine the winner of the APFA trophy. Ranney wrote all the information from these meetings on stationery and thus was promoted to secretary of the league.

== Regular season ==
Returning to the team for the 1920 season would be most of last year's team including quarterback and future Hall of Famer Fritz Pollard. The Pros also added end Bob Nash, who previously played for the Tigers, Al Garrett, and end Al Nesser of the famous Nesser brothers.

The Pros played all their home games at League Park in Akron. The regular season schedule was not a fixed schedule but was created dynamically by each team as the season progressed. The first week of the season opened up on September 26, but the Pros did not have a game scheduled that week, and their season is denoted as beginning in week 2. The Pros played nine games against APFA teams and two against non-APFA teams; they played a total of six games at home. The two non-APFA teams the Pros would play in week two and four when the Pros played against the Wheeling Stogies and the Cincinnati Celts, respectively. In week seven, a game was scheduled to play at home against the Detroit Heralds, but the game was cancelled due to rain.

During the season, Pollard was treated with disrespect because of being African American. He stated, "The white players were trying to hurt me." By the end of the season, Pollard would be one of the highest paid players in the APFA. The main reasons were because of his skin color as well as being a great player.

== Schedule ==
The table below was compiled using the information from the Pro Football Archives and The Coffin Corner, both of which used contemporary newspapers.

Game	Date	Opponent	Result	Record	Venue	Attendance	Recap	Sources
1	October 3	Wheeling Stogies	W 43–0	1–0	League Park	4,000	Recap	
2	October 10	Columbus Panhandles	W 37–0	2–0	League Park	1,500	Recap	
3	October 17	Cincinnati Celts	W 13–0	3–0	League Park	3,000	Recap	
4	October 24	Cleveland Tigers	W 7–0	4–0	League Park	5,000+	Recap	
5	October 31	at Canton Bulldogs	W 10–0	5–0	Lakeside Park	6,000	Recap	
—	November 7	Detroit Heralds	Canceled due to rain.					
6	November 14	at Cleveland Tigers	T 7–7	5–0–1	Dunn Field	8,000	Recap	
7	November 21	Dayton Triangles	W 13–0	6–0–1	League Park	3,700	Recap	
8	November 25	Canton Bulldogs	W 7–0	7–0–1	League Park	6,500	Recap	
9	November 28	at Dayton Triangles	W 14–0	8–0–1	Triangle Park	5,000	Recap	
10	December 5	at Buffalo All-Americans	T 0–0	8–0–2	Buffalo Baseball Park	3,000	Recap	
11	December 12	at Decatur Staleys	T 0–0	8–0–3	Cubs Park	12,000	Recap	
Note: Non-APFA teams are in italics. Thanksgiving Day: November 25.

== Game summaries ==
=== Game 1: vs Wheeling Stogies ===
	1	2	3	4	Total
Stogies	0	0	0	0	0
Pros	8	21	7	7	43

October 3, 1920, at League Park

The Pros made their AFPA debut against the Wheeling Stogies. Playing in front of 4,000 fans, the Pros' defense started the game off with a safety in the first quarter. Throughout the game, Nesser scored three touchdowns—two fumble recoveries and one blocked field goal. Pollard also scored two rushing touchdowns to help lead Akron to a 43–0 victory over the Stogies. Blocking back Harry Harris also contributed by adding one rushing touchdown in the fourth quarter.

=== Game 2: vs Columbus Panhandles ===
	1	2	3	4	Total
Panhandles	0	0	0	0	0
Pros	7	14	14	2	37

October 10, 1920, at League Park

The Pros' next game was against the Columbus Panhandles. Running back Frank McCormick rushed for two touchdowns to give Akron a 14–0 lead in the second quarter. Bob Nash later recovered a fumble in the end zone. Harris and fullback Fred Sweetland also contributed, scoring one rushing touchdown each. Sweetland was hired by coach Elgie Tobin to be a backup, but the coach decided to play Sweetland this game. The defense added another safety in the fourth quarter to give the Akron Pros a 37–0 victory.

=== Game 3: vs Cincinnati Celts ===
	1	2	3	4	Total
Celts	0	0	0	0	0
Pros	7	0	0	6	13

October 17, 1920, at League Park

In week four, the Pros played against the Cincinnati Celts. The Celts were not directly affiliated with the APFA and would not join the league until the following year. Fullback Rip King scored the first touchdown by a five-yard rush in the first quarter. Pollard also scored a touchdown in the fourth quarter en route to a 13–0 Akron victory. The Pro's kicker for that game, Charlie Copley, made one extra point and missed the other. The Pros' defense was so dominant that the Celts did not get a single first down all game long.

=== Game 4: vs Cleveland Tigers ===
	1	2	3	4	Total
Tigers	0	0	0	0	0
Pros	7	0	0	0	7

October 24, 1920, at League Park

The Cleveland Tigers were the Pros next opponent. Playing in front of 6,000 fans, the game was called a "punting duel" by the Youngstown Vindicator. The only score came from a punt block by Bob Nash in the first quarter. Nash grabbed the ball from the Tigers' punter, Stan Cofall on the 8-yard line and ran in for the score. With an extra point from Charlie Copley, the Pros defeated the Tigers 7–0 to keep their undefeated season alive. During the game, injuries for both teams occurred. Pollard dislocated his right shoulder, and Tuffy Conn for the Tigers injured his right leg in the fourth quarter.

=== Game 5: at Canton Bulldogs ===
	1	2	3	4	Total
Pros	3	7	0	0	10
Bulldogs	0	0	0	0	0

October 31, 1920, at Lakeside Park, Canton, Ohio

"With four games under their belt", the Pros were starting to gain attention around the league. Their next game was against the Bulldogs. This game, according to the Youngstown Vindicator, was the first of a two-game series for the "national professional football championship". Playing under a crowd of 10,000, the Pros defeated the Bulldogs 10 to 0. In the first quarter, after an exchange in punts and a long pass which resulted in 13-yards, Charlie Copley of the Pros kicked a 38-yard field goal. On a Bulldog possession at midfield, Gilroy attempted to pass the ball, but it was tipped by the Pros' Copley and Bob Nash. Pike Johnson caught the ball before it landed and ran it back 55 yards for a touchdown. The Youngstown Vindicator called it the "most sensational play of the contest". In the third quarter, Jim Thorpe came into the game, but could not help the Bulldogs score.

=== Game 6: at Cleveland Tigers ===
	1	2	3	4	Total
Pros	0	7	0	0	7
Tigers	0	0	7	0	7

November 14, 1920, at Dunn Park, Cleveland, Ohio

In week eight, the Pros played against the Tigers. Playing in front of 8,000 fans, the Pros allowed their first and only points of the year from a 50-yard touchdown pass from Mark Devlin to Tuffy Conn and an extra point by Al Pierotti in the third quarter. Pollard had a 20-yard rushing touchdown in the second quarter and Copley made an extra point to tie the game at 7–7, making the first tie for the Pros of the season.

=== Game 7: vs Dayton Triangles ===
	1	2	3	4	Total
Triangles	0	0	0	0	0
Pros	0	0	0	13	13

November 21, 1920, at League Park

The Triangles came into this game as one of the few teams left undefeated. The game started out with three scoreless quarters until King threw a 15-yard passing touchdown in the fourth quarter to McCormick. Pollard also rushed for a 17-yard touchdown and Copley made one extra point and missed another one to beat the Triangles 13–0. This brought one of only two loses the Triangles had this season.

=== Game 8: vs Canton Bulldogs ===
	1	2	3	4	Total
Bulldogs	0	0	0	0	0
Pros	7	0	0	0	7

November 25, 1920, at League Park

In a Thanksgiving Day battle touted as the World's Championship of Professional Football, Akron met the Canton Bulldogs for the second time of the 1920 season. A fumbled punt by the Bulldogs gave the Pros the ball at the 32-yard line. On their next drive, the Pros' passing game gave them the lone score, a passing touchdown from King to Nash in the first quarter. Once again, the Pros shutout the Bulldogs, winning 7–0.

=== Game 9: at Dayton Triangles ===
	1	2	3	4	Total
Pros	7	0	7	0	14
Triangles	0	0	0	0	0

November 28, 1920, at Triangle Park, Dayton, Ohio

The Pros were now recognized as the top team in Ohio, and in their second game of week ten, the Pros played against the Triangles. The game could have been classified as a World Championship because of both teams' records, but the APFA had widened its battlefield with Buffalo and Decatur still with a high winning percentage. Pollard returned a punt for a touchdown early in the first quarter and also had one receiving touchdown in the third quarter from King.

=== Game 10: at Buffalo All-Americans ===
	1	2	3	4	Total
Pros	0	0	0	0	0
All-Americans	0	0	0	0	0

December 5, 1920, at Buffalo Baseball Park, Buffalo, New York

Pros had the Buffalo All-Americans as their next opponent. The All-Americans were tired from their 7 to 3 victory against the Canton Bulldogs the day before. Before the start of the game, Nash was sold to the All-Americans for $300 and 5% of the Akron-Buffalo gate, making the first deal in APFA history. The reason for the trade was because rain caused a low number of fans. However, Nash did not appear in the game for either team, and Scotty Bierce replaced Nash for the Pros. The rain caused sloppy game play as well as a small crowd of 3,000 people. It resulted in a 0–0 tie.

=== Game 11: at Decatur Staleys ===
	1	2	3	4	Total
Pros	0	0	0	0	0
Staleys	0	0	0	0	0

December 12, 1920, at Cubs Park, Chicago

The stage was set for a de facto championship battle between the Pros and the Decatur Staleys. In anticipation of additional public interest, Staleys' coach George Halas moved the Decatur home game to the much larger Cubs Park in Chicago and hired Paddy Driscoll from the Cardinals to play on his team in order to help defeat the Pros, which was against league rules at the time. Twelve thousand fans, which was the largest recorded crowd of the season, showed up to watch the game. Of the crowd, about 2,000 were from Pollard's hometown.

The Pros almost scored twice, but failed once because of ineligible receiver penalties. On the other hand, Pollard made a touchdown-saving tackle against Sternment in the third quarter. On the same drive, the Staleys missed a 30-yard field goal. The Staleys' Chamberlin attempted to injure Pollard twice in an attempt to remove him from the game. The final score ended in a 0–0 tie; however, the Chicago Defender reported that the refereeing was biased towards Decatur.

=== Standings ===
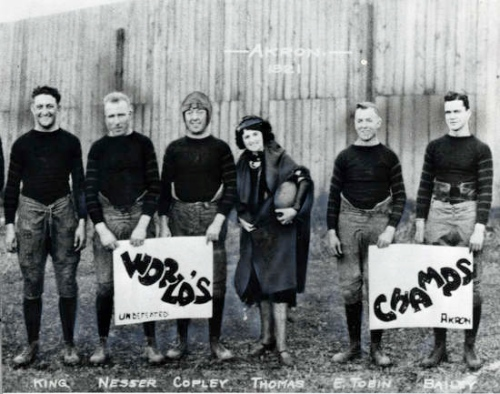
Several Pros players celebrating their championship.

1920 APFA standings
	W	L	T	PCT	DIV	DPCT	PF	PA	STK
Akron Pros†	8	0	3	1.000	6–0–3	1.000	151	7	T2
Decatur Staleys	10	1	2	.909	5–1–2	.833	164	21	T1
Buffalo All-Americans	9	1	1	.900	4–1–1	.800	258	32	T1
Chicago Cardinals	6	2	2	.750	3–2–1	.600	101	29	T1
Rock Island Independents	6	2	2	.750	4–2–1	.667	201	49	W1
Dayton Triangles	5	2	2	.714	4–2–2	.667	150	54	L1
Rochester Jeffersons	6	3	2	.667	0–1–0	.000	156	57	T1
Canton Bulldogs	7	4	2	.636	4–3–1	.571	208	57	W1
Detroit Heralds	2	3	3	.400	1–3–0	.250	53	82	T2
Cleveland Tigers	2	4	2	.333	1–4–2	.200	28	46	L1
Chicago Tigers	2	5	1	.286	1–5–1	.167	49	63	W1
Hammond Pros	2	5	0	.286	0–3–0	.000	41	154	L3
Columbus Panhandles	2	6	2	.250	0–5–0	.000	41	121	W1
Muncie Flyers	0	1	0	.000	0–1–0	.000	0	45	L1

† Awarded the Brunswick-Balke Collender Cup and named APFA Champions
by vote of league owners. Staleys claimed a co-title.

== Postseason ==
Since there were no playoff system in the APFA until 1932, a meeting was held to determine the 1920 NFL Champions. Each team that showed up had a vote to determine the champions. Since the Akron Pros had a 1.000 winning percentage, the Pros were awarded the Brunswick-Balke Collender Cup on April 30, 1921. The trophy was a "silver-loving cup", donated by the Brunswick-Balke-Collender Company. This decision, however, would arise with controversy. The Staleys and the All-Americans each stated that they should win the award because they had more wins and were not beaten by the Akron Pros. Each player from the Pros was also awarded with a golden fob. It was of a football and "1920", "WORLD CHAMPIONS", and each players' first initial and last name was inscribed on the fob.

Five players from the Pros received awards. On December 2, King and Pollard were named 1st Team, Alf Cobb was named 2nd Team, and Nash as well as Brad Tomlin were named 3rd Team all AFPA by the Rock Island Argus. The Pros did not officially celebrate their championship season until the following year. In October 1921, most of the team was invited to the Elks Club of Akron, which was labeled as "a grand homecoming celebration for the world's champions".

== Legacy ==
In their inaugural AFPA season, the Pros posted an undefeated, 8–0–3 season. As a result, they were the first team in the history to complete a non-modern "perfect season". Only four other teams have accomplished this feat: the 1922 Canton Bulldogs at 10–0–2, the 1923 Canton Bulldogs at 11–0–1, the 1929 Green Bay Packers at 12–0–1, and the 1972 Miami Dolphins at 17–0.

Prior to 1972, the NFL did not count ties in winning percentage; however, in that year the NFL altered its rules to treat tied games as being worth half of a win. With that being said, the 1972 Miami Dolphins are the only team to have a modern perfect season.

Three other teams accumulated a perfect regular season record, but lost in the postseason; the 1934 Chicago Bears posted a 13–0 record but lost the 1934 NFL Championship Game to the New York Giants, while the 1942 Chicago Bears posted an 11–0 record but lost the 1942 NFL Championship Game to the Washington Redskins, and the 2007 New England Patriots posted a 16–0 record but lost Super Bowl XLII to the New York Giants.

The 1920 Akron Pros had one of only two black players in the AFPA, Fritz Pollard. He later went on to be in the Pro Football Hall of Fame's class of 2005.

Even though the Pros were given the trophy in 1920, the league lost track of the event, and for a long time published in its own record books that the 1920 championship was undecided. It was not until the 1970s that the NFL discovered its early vote on awarding the Akron Pros the championship.

== Roster ==
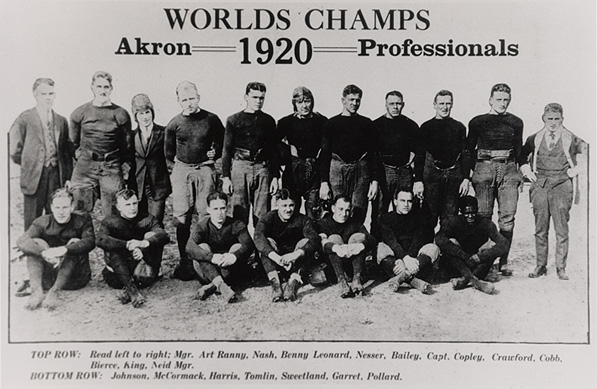
1920 Akron Pros team photo.

Akron Pros 1920 roster
Blocking backs: Harry Harris*; Tommy Holleran; Elgie Tobin; Running backs: Matt Brown; George Conn; Ken Crawford FB; Andy King* FB; Frank McCormick*; Mark Miles; Fritz Pollard*; Fred Sweetland	Linemen: Russ Bailey* C; Scotty Bierce* E; Alf Cobb* G; Charlie Copley* T; Budge Garrett G/T/E; Pike Johnson* T; Frank McCormick* E; Frank Moran T; Bob Nash* E/T; Al Nesser* E; Al Pierotti C; Bill Preston T; Tommy Tomlin* G	Special teams: Russ Bailey K/P/KR/PR; Charlie Copley K; Coaching staff: Elgie tobin – head coach; Art Ranney – manager; Frank Nied – manager; * = starter

== Scores by quarter ==
	1	2	3	4	Total
Opponents	0	0	7	0	7
Pros	39	49	28	35	151

== See also ==
- 1920 APFA season
- List of NFL champions
- Perfect season
