= List of Akron Pros/Indians head coaches =

== Key ==
#	Number of coaches (Note: A running total of the number of coaches of the Ravens. Thus, any coach who has two or more terms as head coach is only counted once.)
Yrs	Years coached
First	First season coached
Last	Last season coached
GC	Games Coached
W	Wins
L	Loses
T	Ties
W%	Win – Loss percentage
‡	Elected into the Pro Football Hall of Fame as a player
*	Spent entire NFL head coaching career with the Pros/Indians

== Coaches ==
#	Image	Name	Term (Note: Each year is linked to an article about that particular NFL season.)			Regular season					Playoffs			Accomplishments	Ref.
#	Image	Name	Yrs	First	Last	GC	W	L	T	W%	GC	W	L	Accomplishments	Ref.
1		Elgie Tobin*	2	1920	1921	23	16	3	4	.783	—			1 NFL Championship (1920)	
2		Fritz Pollard ^{‡}	1	1921		12	8	3	1	.708	—				
3		Brooke Brewer*	1	1922		10	3	5	2	.400	—				
4		Dutch Hendrian*	1	1923		5	0	5	0	.000	—				
5		Wayne Brenkert*	2	1923	1924	10	3	7	0	.300	—				
6		Scotty Bierce*	1	1925		8	4	2	2	.625	—				
7		Frank Nied*	1	1926		6	1	3	2	.333	—				
8		Al Nesser*	1	1926		2	0	1	1	.250	—				
