= Buck Miles =

American football player (1888–1954)

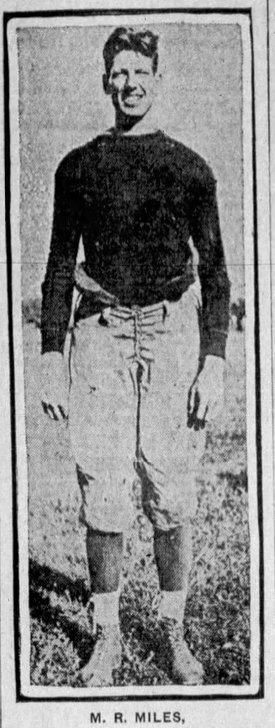
- Miles at Washington & Lee.

Profile
- Position: Fullback

Personal information
- Born: December 10, 1888; Brooklyn, New York, U.S.
- Died: June 21, 1954 (aged 65)
- Listed height: 6 ft 2 in (1.88 m)
- Listed weight: 195 lb (88 kg)

Career information
- High school: Erasmus Hall (Brooklyn, New York)
- College: Washington & Lee

Career history
- Akron Pros (1920)

Awards and highlights
- NFL champion (1920)

Career statistics
- Games played: 1
- Games started: 0
- Stats at Pro Football Reference

Mark Robert "Buck" Miles (December 10, 1888 – June 21, 1954) was a professional football player who played for the Cleveland Tigers in 1919 and for the Akron Pros of the American Professional Football Association (APFA) in 1920. Miles won an APFA-NFL title in 1920 with the Pros. He played college football and basketball at Washington and Lee University.
