= Red Pearlman =

American football player (1898–1985)

Profile
- Position: Tackle

Personal information
- Born: July 31, 1898; Pittsburgh, Pennsylvania, U.S.
- Died: November 28, 1985 (aged 87); Hollywood, Florida, U.S.
- Listed height: 6 ft 0 in (1.83 m)
- Listed weight: 195 lb (88 kg)

Career information
- High school: Fifth Avenue (PA)
- College: Pittsburgh

Career history

Playing
- Cleveland Tigers (1919); Douglas Independents (c.1920); Cleveland Tigers (1920–1921); Bradley Eagles (1922); Rochester Jeffersons (1924)

Coaching
- Douglas Independents (c.1920)

Career statistics
- Games played: 17–18
- Games started: 15
- Stats at Pro Football Reference

Irving Ralph "Red" Pearlman (July 31, 1898 – November 28, 1985) was an American football tackle who played five seasons of professional football. He played for the Ohio League (OL) and National Football League (NFL) Cleveland Tigers, the independent Douglas Independents, the independent Bradley Eagles, and the National Football League (NFL) Rochester Jeffersons, appearing in between 17 and 18 NFL games.

== Biography ==
Red Pearlman was born on July 31, 1898, in Pittsburgh, Pennsylvania. He went to Fifth Avenue High School and attended college at the University of Pittsburgh. He was a standout basketball and football player for their team, the Panthers. Pearlman was part of the undefeated 1917 team under coach Pop Warner. He became ineligible to return in 1918 after playing in a basketball game using another name, violating the rules. In 1919, he played for the Ohio League team the Cleveland Tigers. He appeared in 8 games, 7 as a starter at the tackle position. He played for two teams in 1920: the Cleveland Tigers of the newly formed American Professional Football Association (now National Football League), and the independent Douglas Independents. With Douglas, he served as a player-coach in multiple games. In November of '20, Douglas played against the Ohio All-Stars, which had coach Elgie Tobin, halfback Fritz Pollard, and several players Tobin had acquired from Jim Thorpe. In the game, Pearlman and his teammates were able to shut out the All-Stars, 21 to 0. In 1921, he returned to the Tigers and played in 8 games, starting all 8. He would play for the independent Bradley Eagles before retiring in 1923. He came out of retirement in 1924 and played his final season with the Rochester Jeffersons. With Rochester, he played in 2 games, starting 1. After his professional career he worked as a dentist. He died on November 28, 1985, in Hollywood, Florida. He was 87 years old when he died of heart failure.
