= Matt Brown (running back) =

American football player (1891–1954)

Profile
- Position: Halfback

Personal information
- Born: September 2, 1891; Duluth, Minnesota, U.S.
- Died: April 22, 1954 (aged 62); San Antonio, Texas, U.S.
- Listed height: 5 ft 10 in (1.78 m)
- Listed weight: 170 lb (77 kg)

Career information
- College: Syracuse

Career history
- Akron Pros (1920)

Awards and highlights
- NFL champion (1920)

Career statistics
- Games played: 1
- Stats at Pro Football Reference

Matthew "Matty" Brown (September 2, 1891 – April 22, 1954) was an American football player.

Brown was born in 1891 in Duluth, Minnesota. He attended Syracuse University where he played college football for the Orangemen from 1915 to 1917. He was a starter at halfback for the 1917 Syracuse Orangemen football team that compiled an 8–1–1 record. The New York Times characterized his work as "brilliant" in scoring three touchdowns against Bucknell.

He later played professional football for the 1919 Akron Indians of the Ohio League. He appeared in nine games with the Indians at the halfback and fullback positions during the 1919 season. In 1919, the Indians changed their name to the "Pros" and became a charter member of the National Football League, then known as the American Professional Football Association. Brown appeared in one game for the Pros during the 1920 APFA season. He was granted his release from the Akron club in October 1920 to allow him to coach a football team in St Louis.

Brown later worked in the insurance business in San Antonio. He died there in 1954 at age 62.

== See also ==
- List of players who appeared in only one game in the NFL (1920–1929)
