= Samuel Deutsch =

American sports franchise owner and jeweler (1892–1958)

Profile
- Position: Owner

Personal information
- Born: April 2, 1892; New York City, New York, U.S.
- Died: September 4, 1958 (aged 66); Cleveland, Ohio, U.S.

Career history

owner
- 1923: Cleveland Indians
- 1924–1927: Cleveland Bulldogs

Awards and highlights
- NFL champion (1924)

Samuel H. Deutsch (April 2, 1892 – September 4, 1958) was a prominent sports franchise owner and jeweler. He is best known as being the owner of the National Football League (NFL)'s Cleveland Indians, formerly the Cleveland Tigers, in 1923 as well as for moving the Canton Bulldogs to Cleveland from Canton and renaming the team the Cleveland Bulldogs.

== Jeweler ==
He was born in New York City, however his family moved to Cleveland, in 1899. After finishing school, Sam began working for his father's jewellery firm, where he learned the art of diamond cutting. He succeeded his father as company president and became chairman of the board in 1956, with his son Robert as president.

== Sports ==
In 1923, Deutsch bought the defunct Cleveland Tigers franchise after it was vacated by Jimmy O'Donnell, and renamed the team the Cleveland Indians. During the 1923 season, the Indians finished in fifth place in the 20-team NFL. Prior to purchasing the Indians, Deutsch was involved in both minor league baseball and boxing in Cleveland. During that season though, the NFL champion Canton Bulldogs lost money, and Deutsch purchased the team for $1,500 from a group of Canton businessmen. He took the team's best players out of Canton and renamed the team the Cleveland Bulldogs, leaving the Canton franchise inactive.

The Cleveland Bulldogs won the 1924 NFL championship, and Deutsch sold the inactive franchise back to Canton for $3,000. With key players returning to Canton in time for the 1925 season. The Cleveland Bulldogs though finished the 1925 season in 12th place in the NFL.

After a hiatus in 1926, Deutsch revived the Cleveland Bulldogs. Although the team finished fourth in 1927, it was unsuccessful financially, and Deutsch sold the franchise to Elliot Fisher owner of the Detroit Wolverines. The 1928 Wolverines roster included 12 former Bulldogs, 8 of whom became New York Giants when Fisher sold the Wolverines to Tim Mara in 1929.
