= Fred Sweetland =

American football player (1893–1958)

Profile
- Positions: Fullback, Wingback

Personal information
- Born: November 1893; Everett, Massachusetts, U.S.
- Died: February 4, 1958 (aged 64)
- Listed height: 5 ft 10 in (1.78 m)
- Listed weight: 175 lb (79 kg)

Career information
- College: Fordham, Washington & Lee

Career history
- Akron Pros (1920); New York Brickley Giants (1921)

Awards and highlights
- NFL champion (1920)

Career statistics
- Games played: 5
- Games started: 0
- Stats at Pro Football Reference

Frederick Greenhalge Sweetland (November 1893 – February 4, 1958) was a professional football player. He played in the American Professional Football Association (APFA) (which became the National Football League in 1922) with the Akron Pros and the New York Brickley Giants. Brickley's New York Giants are not related to the modern-day New York Giants.

Prior to joining the NFL, Ray played college football at Fordham University and Washington and Lee University.
