= 1919 Cleveland Indians (NFL) season =

American football team season

1919 Cleveland Indians season
- Home stadium: League Park

Results
- Record: 0–2–1

The 1919 Cleveland Indians season was their last season in Ohio League before its evolution into the American Professional Football Association. The team posted a known record of 0–2–1. Of the games that are known, the 1919 Indians are one of only a handful of teams to have never scored a point in an entire season.

== Schedule ==
Game	Date	Opponent	Result	Record
1	September 28	Toledo Maroons	T 0–0	0–0–1
2	October 12	Massillon Tigers	L 0–3	0–1–1
3	November 25	Massillon Tigers	L 0–7	0–2–1
