= Art Ranney =

American football executive (1889–1970)

Arthur F. Ranney
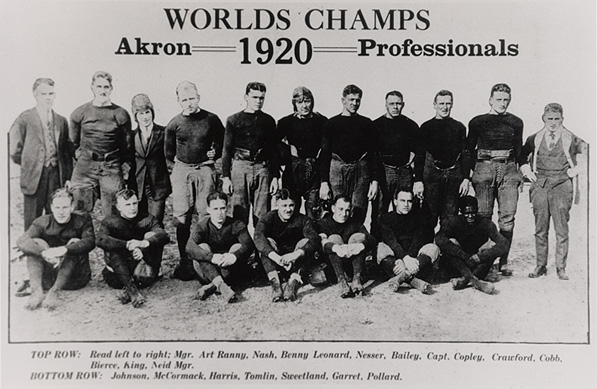
- 1920 Akron championship team photo. Ranney is in the top row, furthest left.

Profile
- Position: Owner

Personal information
- Born: February 17, 1889; Lima, Ohio, U.S.
- Died: April 22, 1970 (aged 81); Volusia County, Florida, U.S.

Career information
- College: Buchtel

Career history

owner
- 1919–1925: Akron Pros
- 1926: Akron Indians

Awards and highlights
- NFL champion (1920); National Football League co-founder (1920)

Arthur Fobare Ranney (February 17, 1889 – April 22, 1970) was a co-founder of the American Professional Football Association (later renamed the National Football League in 1922), as an owner of the Akron Pros, one of the league's charter teams. The Pros were renamed the Akron Indians in 1926.

== Purchasing the Indians ==
In 1920, Ranney was a local businessman in Akron, Ohio, as well as an ex-football player for the University of Akron. After experiencing financial losses from 1912 to 1919, the Akron Indians, of the "Ohio League", was sold to Ranney and Frank Nied, a local cigar store owner. The 1919 Indians finished the season 5–5–0 and suffered financial losses, despite the presence of one of the country's best breakaway runners, Fritz Pollard. As the team's new owners, Ranney and Neid dropped the Indian moniker and adopted a new name, the "Akron Pros," hoping to inspire better results or at least better attendance.

== Founding of the NFL ==
Ranney and Neid attended the August 20, 1920, and September 17, 1920, meetings, at Ralph Hay's Hupmobile dealership, which established the NFL. The original copy of the minutes for the September 17, 1920, league meeting were recorded on a piece of Akron Pros stationary by Ranney. He was then elected secretary and treasurer of the league.

== 1920 Championship ==
The Pros won the very first APFA/NFL championship. In April 1921, the league voted to award the title and the Brunswick-Balke Collender Cup to Akron on the basis of having an undefeated record and allowing only 7 points in 9 games. the decision was protested by the Decatur Staleys and the Buffalo All-Americans, who had tied Akron during the season. Neid and Ranney picked up the trophy and, according to league records, gave congratulatory speeches.

After a third-place finish in 1921, the Pros began to decline. In 1926, their name was changed back to the Indians, but that didn't help. Neid coached the team for six games that ended in a 1–3–2 record. Due to financial issues, Neid and Ranney suspended team operations in 1927 and surrendered the franchise the following year.

== Race and the NFL ==
In the 1940s, Fritz Pollard allegeded that several of the owners attempted to raise the issue of a color barrier in pro football. According to Pollard, Doc Young of the Hammond Pros as well as Akron's Neid and Ranney refused to allow the discussion to take place. They could not understand why a player could not be considered a player without his color being brought into account.

Pollard also stated that Neid and Ranney befriended him and feared for his safety as an African-American. Neid and Ranney also made Pollard the first African-American coach in the NFL.

== Later life ==
Ranney later lived in Summit County, Ohio, where he was the county engineer. He later retired to Florida, where he died in Volusia County on April 22, 1970. He was buried in Daytona Beach, Florida.
