= Rip King =

American football player (1895–1950)

No. 3
- Position: Fullback

Personal information
- Born: October 25, 1895; Franklin, Tennessee, U.S.
- Died: March 4, 1950 (aged 54); Reno, Nevada, U.S.
- Listed height: 6 ft 1 in (1.85 m)
- Listed weight: 205 lb (93 kg)

Career information
- College: West Virginia

Career history
- Akron Pros (1920–1922); Chicago Cardinals (1923–1924); Hammond Pros (1925–1926)

Awards and highlights
- NFL champion (1920); 3× First-team All-Pro (1920–1922)

Career statistics
- Games played: 43
- Games started: 32
- Rushing touchdowns: 5
- Stats at Pro Football Reference

Andrew V. "Rip" King (October 25, 1895 – March 4, 1950) was an American professional football player who was a fullback for six seasons for the Akron Pros, Chicago Cardinals, and Hammond Pros of the National Football League (NFL). He played college football for the West Virginia Mountaineers.

In March 1950, King died of a self-inflicted gunshot wound, at the age of 54.
