= Brooke Brewer =

American athlete (1894–1970)

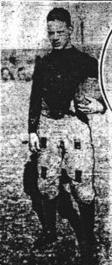
- Brewer while on the U.S. Army's "Usaacs" team.

Profile
- Position: Back

Personal information
- Born: November 21, 1894; Washington, D.C., U.S.
- Died: February 11, 1970 (aged 75); Pompano Beach, Florida, U.S.

Career information
- College: Maryland

Career history

Playing
- 1921: Cleveland Indians
- 1922: Akron Pros

Coaching
- 1922: Akron Pros

Awards and highlights
- University of Maryland Athletic Hall of Fame (1984); Coaching record: 3–5–2
- Coaching profile at Pro Football Reference

Other information
- Military career
- Allegiance: United States
- Branch: U.S. Army
- Service years: 1917–1919
- Unit: U.S. Army Ambulance Corps
- Conflicts: World War I

Edward "Untz" Brooke Brewer (1894–1970) was an American athlete. Brewer played two seasons of professional football with the Cleveland Indians and Akron Pros in the National Football League (NFL). He was considered one of the best high school quarterbacks in the country and played college football at Maryland State College. Brewer was also an accomplished track and field athlete.

== Early life ==
Brewer was born on November 21, 1894, in Washington, D.C. He attended the St. Albans School, where he played baseball and football and competed in track and field. Brewer beat Olympian Howard Drew in the 50-yard dash, and was considered one of the finest athletes in the nation. In 1916 he was part of the St Albans team that won the Prep School Mile Relay Championship at the Penn Relays. The New York Times also called him one of the best quarterbacks in the South. He originally intended to go to the University of Pennsylvania, but instead attended Maryland State College, which is now known as the University of Maryland.

== College and military service ==
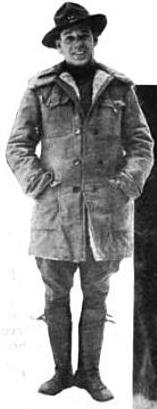
Brewer while stationed at Camp Crane

Brewer enrolled at Maryland in 1916. That year, he competed in the 60-yard dash and 70-yard high hurdles events. He also set a world record for the indoor 50-yard dash and ran the 100-yard dash in 9.6 seconds. In addition to track, Brewer also played football during the 1916 season.

The following year, Brewer left college in order to enter the United States Army during World War I. He was stationed at Camp Crane in Allentown, Pennsylvania to train as part of the U.S. Army Ambulance Corps (USAAC) before deployment to France. While in Pennsylvania, he played on the "Usaacs" football team. Its roster included other future football professionals such as Tuffy Conn and Carl Beck.

By 1920, Brewer was back at Maryland and participated in football and track for two more seasons. The football team's successes in 1920 and 1921 were largely credited to Brewer's drop-kicking ability. In track, he served as the captain for his final season in 1922. He was also a member of the Kappa Alpha Order. In 1920, he participated in the fraternity's inaugural "The Cotton Pickers' Minstrel Show", which was described as a financial and critical success. Brewer graduated in 1922 with an "Arts and Sciences" degree.

== Professional football ==
Brewer played professionally in the National Football League as a halfback and fullback for two seasons. In 1921, he played for the Cleveland Indians, but recorded no statistics. In 1922, he played for the Akron Pros. He saw action in eight games, including four starts, and scored one rushing touchdown. During that season, he also served as Akron's head coach, and the team compiled a record of 3–5–2.

Brewer died on February 12, 1970, in Pompano Beach, Florida. He was inducted into the University of Maryland Athletic Hall of Fame in 1984.
