= Pike Johnson =

American football player (1896–1985)

Profile
- Positions: Tackle, guard

Personal information
- Born: May 2, 1896; East Boston, Massachusetts, U.S.
- Died: November 6, 1985 (aged 89); Meredith, New Hampshire, U.S.
- Listed height: 5 ft 11 in (1.80 m)
- Listed weight: 185 lb (84 kg)

Career information
- High school: Everett (Everett, Massachusetts)
- College: Washington & Lee

Career history
- Massillon Tigers (1917, 1919); Akron Pros (1920–1921)

Awards and highlights
- NFL champion (1920); First-team All-Pro (1917)
- Military career
- Allegiance: United States
- Branch: U.S. Army
- Service years: 1918–1919
- Conflicts: World War I
- Awards: Purple Heart

Career statistics
- Games played: 22
- Games started: 20
- Stats at Pro Football Reference

Karl Hilmer "Pike" Johnson (May 2, 1896 – November 6, 1985) was a professional football player in the American Professional Football Association (APFA) (later renamed the National Football League in 1922) for the Akron Pros. In 1920 he and the Pros were awarded the very first NFL Championship.

== Early life ==
Johnson was born on September 30, 1896, in East Boston, Massachusetts. He played football for Everett High School in Everett, Massachusetts. He was a part of the 1914 Everett team that went 13–0 and outscored opponents 600 to 0. In the national championship of high school football, Everett, the best team in the East, was matched against Oak Park High School from Illinois, the best team in the West. Everett defeated Oak Park 80 to 0. Johnson went on to play tackle at Washington and Lee University.

== Football career ==
In 1917, Johnson played with the Massillon Tigers of the Ohio League, where he received all-pro honors in 1917. He was also World War I Army veteran and Purple Heart recipient. After the war he played another season for Massillon and then played for the Akron Pros in 1920.

== Later life ==
After his football career, Johnson worked for many years in the public relations department of the Hiram Walker & Sons Ltd. in Boston. He resided in Belmont, Massachusetts, and later in Laconia, New Hampshire.

Johnson died on November 6, 1985, at a nursing home in Meredith, New Hampshire.

== Pro Football Hall of Fame memorabilia ==
In 2010 Johnson's grandson donated the miniature football shaped medallion (called a fob), to the Pro Football Hall of Fame. The fob was given to his grandfather after winning the 1920 championship. During the visit, it was discovered that Pike Johnson was incorrectly identified as Frank Leonard Johnson who appears that the league's all-time roster, which also appears on NFL.com. However, it was the wrong "Pike" Johnson, one who never played with the Akron Pros. Also the jeweler who inscribed his name on the fob made a mistake when the first initial of "C" rather than "K" was etched onto the back of the gold piece.
