= Alf Cobb =

American football player (1892–1974)

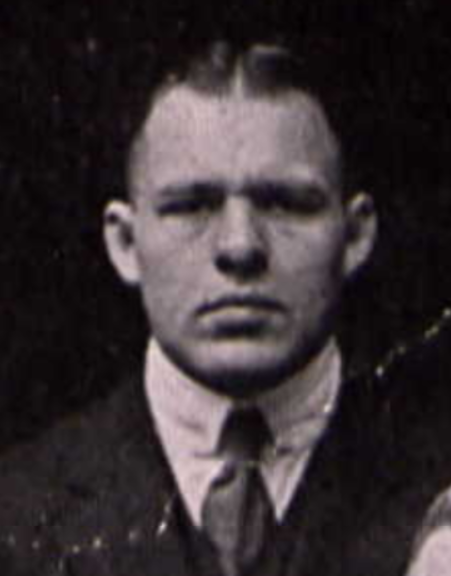
- Cobb from 1919 Syracuse yearbook

No. 15
- Positions: Guard, tackle

Personal information
- Born: June 7, 1892; Athol, Massachusetts, U.S.
- Died: September 2, 1974 (aged 82); West Hartford, Connecticut, U.S.
- Listed height: 5 ft 11 in (1.80 m)
- Listed weight: 210 lb (95 kg)

Career information
- High school: Waltham (MA)
- College: Syracuse

Career history
- Akron Pros (1920–1921); Cleveland Bulldogs (1925)

Awards and highlights
- NFL champion (1920); Second-team All-Pro (1920); Consensus All-American (1917)

Career statistics
- Games played: 21
- Games started: 16
- Stats at Pro Football Reference

Alfred Russell Cobb (June 7, 1892 – September 12, 1974) was an American professional football player in the National Football League (NFL). He played college football for the Syracuse Orange.

== Career ==
Cobb attended Syracuse University, where he played for the Orange. In 1917, he was recognized as a consensus first-team All-American at the tackle position, having received first-team honors from International News Service (INS), News Enterprise Association (NEA), and Collier's Weekly (as selected by Walter Camp).

Cobb played in the early days of the NFL, when it was still known as the American Professional Football Association (APFA), including for the Akron Pros and the Cleveland Bulldogs. As a member of the 1920 Akron Pros, Cobb was a member of the first NFL Championship team.

Over three APFA/NFL seasons, Cobb played in 21 games as a lineman, starting 16 of them.
