= Charlie Copley =

American football player and coach (1887–1944)

Profile
- Positions: Tackle, end

Personal information
- Born: September 1, 1887; Mahanoy City, Pennsylvania, U.S.
- Died: May 29, 1944 (aged 56); Reading, Pennsylvania, U.S.
- Listed height: 5 ft 9 in (1.75 m)
- Listed weight: 191 lb (87 kg)

Career information
- College: Muhlenberg, Missouri S&T

Career history

Playing
- Massillon Tigers (1917); Akron Pros (1920–1922); Milwaukee Badgers (1922); Gilberton Cadamounts (1923–1926)

Coaching
- Gilberton Cadamounts (1923)

Awards and highlights
- NFL champion (1920)

Career NFL statistics
- Games played: 30
- Games started: 25
- Stats at Pro Football Reference

Charles Francis Copley (September 1, 1887 – May 29, 1944) was a professional football player who played for the Akron Pros and the Milwaukee Badgers of the National Football League (NFL). He played college football at Muhlenberg College and Missouri University of Science and Technology.

== Career ==
He was also a former teammate of Fritz Pollard during his time with the Pros and the Badgers. In 1923 Charles became the coach of the Gilberton Cadamounts. This caused Copley to recruit Pollard to play for Gilberton, making Pollard the first African-American to play football in Pennsylvania's coal region. In 1917, Copley played alongside Bob Nash for the Massillon Tigers. The Tigers played in the "Ohio League", which was the direct predecessor to the NFL.
