= Frank McCormick (American football) =

American football player (1894–1976)

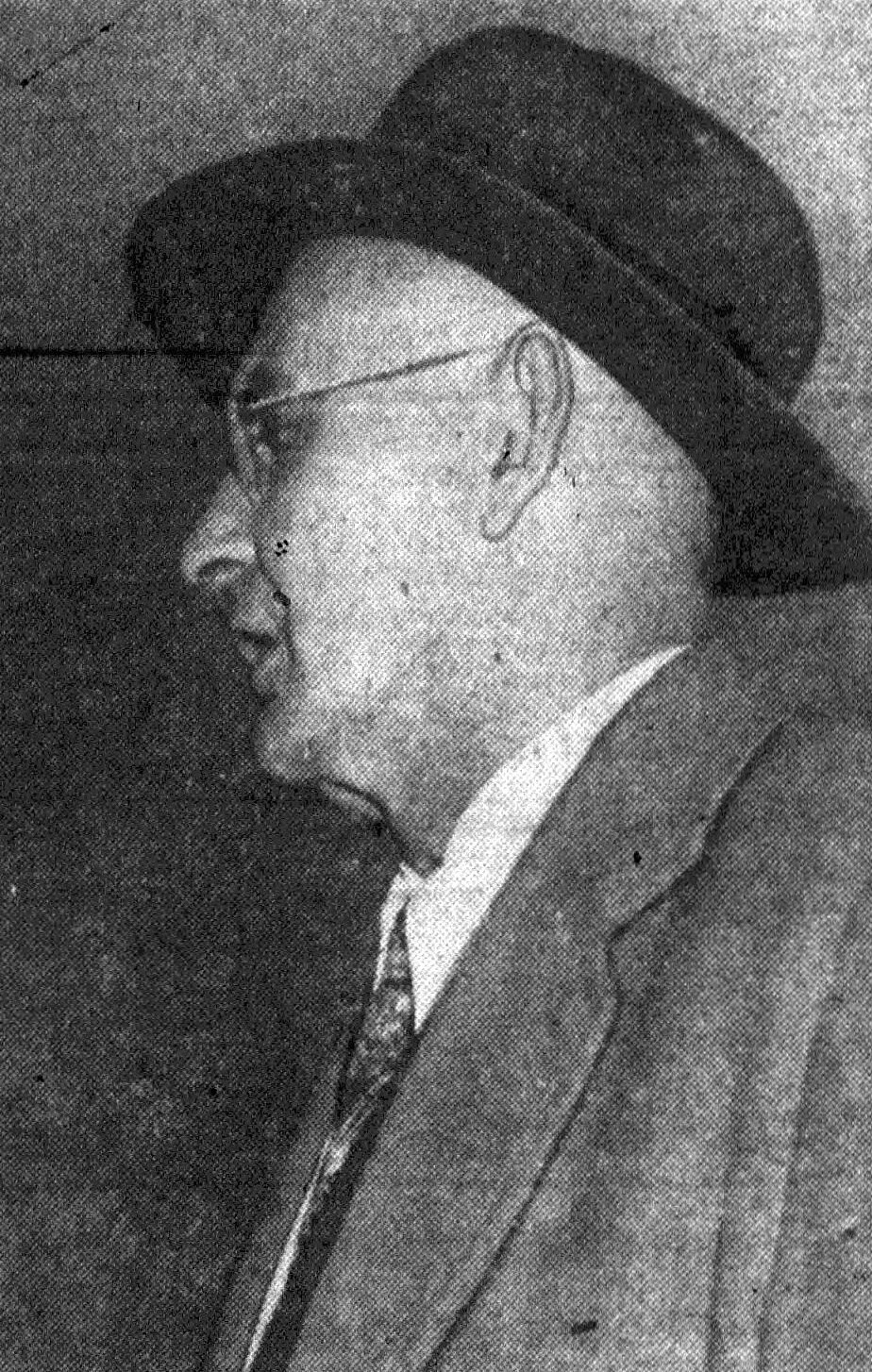
- McCormick in 1951

Profile
- Positions: Halfback, wingback

Personal information
- Born: November 5, 1894; Genoa, Nebraska, U.S.
- Died: March 24, 1976 (aged 81); Orange County, California, U.S.
- Listed height: 5 ft 11 in (1.80 m)
- Listed weight: 190 lb (86 kg)

Career information
- High school: Wagner (Wagner, South Dakota)
- College: South Dakota (1912–1916)

Career history

Playing
- Akron Pros (1920–1921); Cincinnati Celts (1921)

Coaching
- Football: Columbus (SD) (1922–1924) Head coach; Minnesota (1930–1932) Backfield coach; Baseball: Minnesota (1931–1941) Head coach

Operations
- Columbus (SD) (1922–1925) Athletic director; Minnesota (1932–1941) Athletic director; Minnesota (1945–1950) Athletic director

Awards and highlights
- NFL champion (1920)

Career statistics
- Rushing touchdowns: 3
- Games played: 11
- Games started: 9
- Stats at Pro Football Reference

Frank G. McCormick (November 5, 1894 – March 24, 1976) was an American football player and coach. He was the first South Dakotan to play professional football. He played from 1920 to 1921 with the Akron Pros and the Cincinnati Celts of the American Professional Football Association (AFCA)—the league changed its name to the National Football League (NFL) in 1922. Originally a guard, Frank was made a wingback by the Pros. He won an AFPA championship with Akron in 1920.

Before playing professional football, McCormick played college football at the University of South Dakota. He played with the Coyotes from 1912 until 1916. He also played basketball and baseball while at South Dakota. In 1973, McCormick was inducted into the Coyote Sports Hall of Fame.

McCormick served as the head football coach at Columbus College in Chamberlain, South Dakota from 1922 to 1924. In 1930, he was hired as the backfield coach at the University of Minnesota. At Minnesota, he was also head coach of the Minnesota Golden Gophers baseball team from 1931 to 1941 and the school's athletic director for two stints, from 1932 to 1941 and 1945 to 1950. In 2014, McCormick was inducted into the University of Minnesota "M" Club Hall of Fame. He is also a member of the American Baseball Coaches Association Hall of Fame.

== Head coaching record ==
=== Football ===
| Year | Team | Overall | Conference | Standing | Bowl/playoffs |
|---|---|---|---|---|---|
Columbus Mariners (South Dakota Intercollegiate Conference) (1922–1924)
| 1922 | Columbus | 2–5 | 1–1 | 5th | |
| 1923 | Columbus | 5–1 | 5–0 | T–1st | |
| 1924 | Columbus | 6–2 | 6–0 | 1st | |
| Columbus: | | 13–8 | 12–1 | | |
| Total: | | 13–8 | | | |
National championship Conference title Conference division title or championship game berth
