= Ike Martin =

American football player and sports coach (1887–1979)

Profile
- Positions: Halfback, quarterback

Personal information
- Born: July 15, 1887; Liberty, Missouri, U.S.
- Died: July 20, 1979 (aged 92); Aurora, Colorado, U.S.
- Listed height: 5 ft 11 in (1.80 m)
- Listed weight: 190 lb (86 kg)

Career information
- College: William Jewell

Career history

Playing
- Canton Bulldogs (1920); Cleveland Indians (1921)

Coaching
- Heidelberg (1914–1916) (head coach); St. Ignatius (OH) / John Carroll (1922–1923) (head coach)
- Stats at Pro Football Reference

Isaac Roy Martin (July 15, 1887 – July 20, 1979) was an American professional football player and coach of football and basketball. He played in the National Football League (NFL) with the Canton Bulldogs in 1920. Martin served as the head football coach at Heidelberg University in Tiffin, Ohio from 1914 to 1916 and John Carroll University in University Heights, Ohio from 1922 to 1923.

== Head coaching record ==
=== Football ===
Year	Team	Overall	Conference	Standing	Bowl/playoffs
Heidelberg (Independent) (1914–1916)
1914	Heidelberg	4–3–1			
1915	Heidelberg	5–2–1			
1916	Heidelberg	8–2			
Heidelberg:		17–7–2			
St. Ignatius / John Carroll (Independent) (1922–1923)
1922	St. Ignatius	4–1–3			
1923	John Carroll	4–4–1			
St. Ignatius / John Carroll:		8–5–4			
Total:		25–12–6			
