= Jimmy O'Donnell =

American football executive (1872–1947)

James M. O'Donnell
- Born: November 3, 1872; Cleveland, Ohio, U.S.
- Died: October 1, 1946 (aged 73); Cleveland, Ohio, U.S.
- Known for: Founder and Owner of the: Cleveland Tigers (1919-1922)
- Political party: Democrat
- Spouse: Nora Mitchell O'Donnell
- Children: William M. O'Donnell, Mrs. John Joyce, James E. O'Donnell
- Parent(s): Mary and Murray O'Donnell

James M. O'Donnell (November 3, 1872 - October 1, 1947) was the owner and co-founder of the first National Football League (then called the American Professional Football Association) franchise in Cleveland, called the Cleveland Tigers. He was also the manager of a Cleveland semiprofessional baseball team.

== Cleveland Tigers ==
A sports promoter at the time, O'Donnell and pro football player Stan Cofall established the Tigers in 1919, after obtaining a contract to use Cleveland's League Park for football games. He announced himself as the business manager of a new Cleveland Tigers and was backed by several substantial financial men of Cleveland. He stated that his ballclub could play up to the same level as the Canton Bulldogs, Massillon Tigers, and Akron Indians, if only he could schedule games with them.

The team playing in the "Ohio League" until the AFPA was established in 1920. Both Cofall and O'Donnell represented the Tigers at the September 17, 1920 meeting in Canton at the showroom of Ralph Hay's Hupmobile Agency where 10 team leaders created the American Professional Football Association. The Tigers finished the 1920 season, in 9th place in the 14-team league standings. The following season had the Association posting 21 teams, with the Tigers finishing in 11th place. APFA was reorganized as the NFL at the beginning of the 1922 season. To insure its financial viability, the league voted to have each team post a $1000 guarantee against forfeiture during the season. O'Donnell was unable to provide the money and sold the now-defunct Cleveland franchise to jeweler Samuel Deutsch in 1923.

== Other careers ==
O'Donnell also served as a deputy sheriff at one time. He was also associated with Dann Spring Insert Company, and worked for the Bailey Company as a personnel manager from 1914 until 1934. In 1934 he established a real estate business on Cleveland's west side.

== Politics and death ==
O'Donnell was the Democratic Party's nominee for state representative in 1946, when he died shortly before the election.
