= Tommy Holleran =

American football player and coach (1897–1930)

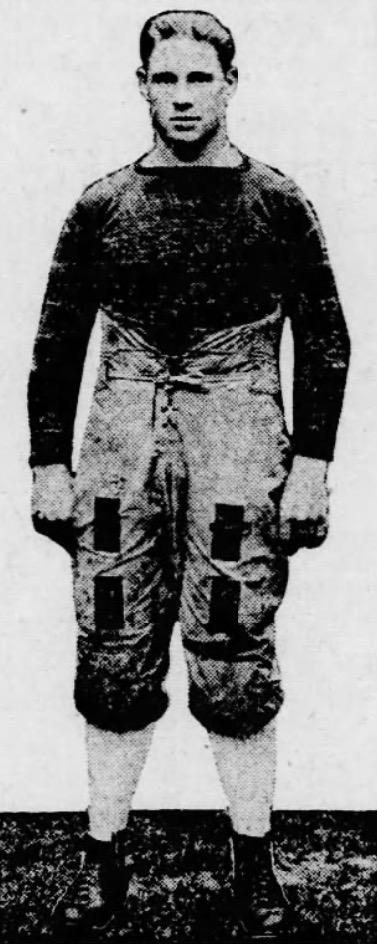
- Holleran in 1922

Profile
- Position: Blocking back

Personal information
- Born: June 24, 1897; Akron, Ohio, U.S.
- Died: October 21, 1930 (aged 33); Akron, Ohio, U.S.
- Listed weight: 175 lb (79 kg)

Career information
- High school: South (Akron, OH)

Career history
- Akron Pros (1920); Toledo Maroons (1922)

Awards and highlights
- NFL champion (1920)

Career statistics
- Games started: 1
- Games played: 2
- Stats at Pro Football Reference

Head coaching record
- Career: 18–31–5 (.380)

Thomas J. Holleran (June 24, 1897 – October 21, 1930) was an American football player. He played professionally as a blocking back for two seasons with two different teams of the National Football League (NFL), the Akron Pros in 1920 and the Toledo Maroons in 1922. He died of inflammatory rheumatism on October 21, 1930, at his home in Akron, Ohio.
