= Bob Nash (American football) =

American football player (1892–1977)

No. 12, 13, 18
- Positions: Tackle, end

Personal information
- Born: December 16, 1892; County Meath, Ireland
- Died: February 1, 1977 (aged 84); Winchester, Connecticut, U.S.
- Listed height: 6 ft 1 in (1.85 m)
- Listed weight: 205 lb (93 kg)

Career information
- High school: Bernardsville (NJ) Bernards
- College: Cornell, Rutgers

Career history

Playing
- Massillon Tigers (1917, 1919); Akron Pros (1920); Buffalo All-Americans (1920–1923); Rochester Jeffersons (1924); New York Giants (1925)

Coaching
- Massillon Tigers (1917, 1919)

Awards and highlights
- NFL champion (1920); First-team All-Pro (1921); Third-team All-Pro (1920); Second-team All-American (1914); Rutgers University Hall of Fame

Career statistics
- Games played: 33
- Games started: 31
- Touchdowns scored: 1
- Stats at Pro Football Reference

Robert Arthur “Nasty” Nash (December 16, 1892 – February 1, 1977) was an Irish-American professional football player who played in the American Professional Football Association (APFA) for the Akron Pros, Buffalo All-Americans, Rochester Jeffersons and New York Giants. Prior to joining the AFPA, Nash played in the "Ohio League" for the Massillon Tigers. He was considered by sports historians as one of the greatest tackles of his era.

Nash was born in Ireland and raised in Bernardsville, New Jersey, where he played high school football at Bernards High School. Prior to playing professional football, Nash played college football at Cornell University and at Rutgers, where he received All-American honors in 1914. He was inducted into the Rutgers Hall of Fame in 1988.

== Professional career ==
On Sunday, October 10, 1920, Nash is credited with the first fumble recovery for a touchdown in a game featuring two league teams.

On Sunday, October 24, 1920, Nash picked up a blocked punt in the first quarter and ran eight yards for the only score of the day as the Pros defeated the Cleveland Tigers, 7–0.

On Sunday, October 31, 1920, according to Ike Roy Martin; on a punt return Jim Thorpe had instructed Martin to let Nash get by him. Thorpe had wanted to run into Nash, which he did. The collision resulted in them both being knocked out and they were carried off the field.

Nash was also a part of the first APFA player deal, in 1920, when Akron sold Nash to Buffalo for $300 and five percent of the gate receipts during a game between the two clubs. However, since Nash was a part of the Akron Pros during their championship season, he is credited as belonging on their championship team. Nash was also the very first captain of the New York Giants.
