= Scotty Bierce =

American football player and coach (1896–1982)

No. 10, 11
- Position: End

Personal information
- Born: September 3, 1896; Kearney, Nebraska, U.S.
- Died: April 26, 1982 (aged 85); Valley City, Ohio, U.S.
- Listed height: 5 ft 9 in (1.75 m)
- Listed weight: 164 lb (74 kg)

Career information
- High school: Cuyahoga Falls (Cuyahoga Falls, Ohio)
- College: Akron

Career history

Playing
- Akron Pros (1920–1922); Cleveland Indians (1923); Buffalo All-Americans (1923); Cleveland Bulldogs (1924); Akron Indians (1925)

Coaching
- Akron Pros (1925)

Awards and highlights
- 2× NFL champion (1920, 1924)

Career statistics
- Games played: 48
- Games started: 34
- Receiving touchdowns: 5
- Stats at Pro Football Reference
- Coaching profile at Pro Football Reference

Bruce Wallace "Scotty" Bierce (September 3, 1896 – April 26, 1982) was an American lawyer and professional American football player and coach. After a career in the NFL, he had a distinguished career as a lawyer in Akron, Ohio that lasted for more than 50 years. In Akron he was a senior and named partner in the firm of Brouse and McDowell; one of that city's largest and most important law firms.

== Early life and Sports career ==
The son of Wallace Bierce, Scotty Bierce was born in Nebraska in 1896. In c. 1900 he moved with his family to Tallmadge, Ohio, and in 1910 the family moved again to Cuyahoga Falls, Ohio. He was educated at Cuyahoga Falls High School (CFHS) where he played on the school's gridiron football team and played as a catcher on CFHS's baseball team. He played as an End in college football at University of Akron in 1916, 1917, and again in 1919. In 1918 he played for the Chicago Maroons at the University of Chicago.

Bierce played in the National Football League from 1920 to 1925. From 1920 to 1922 he played for the Akron Pros. This was followed by time as a player with the Cleveland Indians (1923), Buffalo All-Americans (1923), and Cleveland Bulldogs (1924). Bierce won a league title in 1920 with the Pros and he won a second title in 1924 with the Bulldogs. Scotty also served as a player-coach for the Pros in 1925.

== Law career and later life ==
While playing in the NFL, Bierce attended the Case Western Reserve University School of Law where he graduated with a law degree in 1925. After his playing career ended, he became a prominent Akron attorney and a community leader.

The Bruce W. "Scotty" Bierce Athletic Scholarship Fund is an athletic scholarship at the University of Akron. It was established in Scott's will and provides scholarships for deserving athletes at the university. Awards are made by the director of athletics in cooperation with the University Scholarship Committee. Bierce excelled in football while at the university. He was inducted into the Summit County Sports Hall of Fame in 1957 and the University of Akron Sports Hall of Fame in 1975.
