= Tuffy Conn =

American football player (1892–1973)

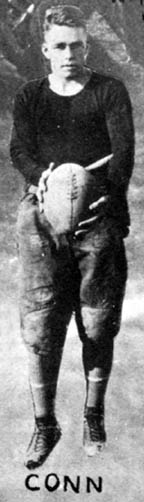
- Conn in 1918

Profile
- Position: Back

Personal information
- Born: February 22, 1892; Hebron, Illinois, U.S.
- Died: August 2, 1973 (aged 81); Laguna Beach, California, U.S.
- Listed height: 5 ft 6 in (1.68 m)
- Listed weight: 155 lb (70 kg)

Career information
- High school: Pasadena (Pasadena, California)
- College: Oregon State (1916), Penn (1917–1919)

Career history

Playing
- Massillon Tigers (1919); Cleveland Tigers (1920); Akron Pros (1920)

Coaching
- John Carroll (1920; HC)

Awards and highlights
- NFL champion (1920)
- Military career
- Allegiance: United States
- Branch: U.S. Army
- Service years: 1917–1919
- Unit: U.S. Army Ambulance Corps
- Conflicts: World War I

Career statistics
- Games played: 9
- Games started: 3
- Stats at Pro Football Reference

Head coaching record
- Career: 4–2 (.667)

George Washington "Tuffy" Conn (February 22, 1892 – August 2, 1973) was an American professional football player who played in the Ohio League for the Massillon Tigers in 1919. In 1920 he played for the Cleveland Tigers and the Akron Pros of the American Professional Football Association (renamed the National Football League (NFL) in 1922). Conn won the first AFPA-NFL title that season with the Pros.

== College years ==
Before playing professional football, Conn played college football at Oregon Agricultural College (now called Oregon State University). In 1916, under coach E. J. Stewart, Conn ran for a record 103 yard touchdown off of a fumble recovery. Conn left the Aggies after his freshman year and transferred to Penn. There he continued to play football for the Quakers.

== World War I ==
During World War I, Conn was stationed at Camp Crane in Allentown, Pennsylvania to train as part of the U.S. Army Ambulance Corps (USAAC) before deploying to France. While in Pennsylvania, he played on the "Usaacs" football team with future notable professional players Brooke Brewer and Carl Beck.

== Coach ==
Conn was also the coach of the 1920 football squad at John Carroll University. During his one season with the college, the team compiled a 4–2 record.

== Post-football ==
Conn later moved to Pasadena, California and became a successful real estate agent and a member of the prestigious Pasadena Athletic Club.

== Head coaching record ==
Year	Team	Overall	Conference	Standing	Bowl/playoffs
St. Ignatius (Independent) (1920)
1920	St. Ignatius	4-2			
St. Ignatius:		4-2			
Total:		4–2			
