= Ralph Hay =

American football executive (1891–1944)

Ralph Edward Hay
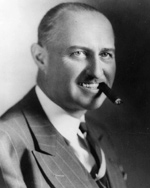

Profile
- Position: Owner

Personal information
- Born: January 12, 1891; Canton, Ohio, U.S.
- Died: July 29, 1944 (aged 53); Canton, Ohio, U.S.

Career information
- College: None

Career history

owner
- 1918–1922: Canton Bulldogs

Awards and highlights
- 2× NFL champion (1922, 1923); Ohio League champion (1919); Co-founder of the NFL (1920)

Ralph Edward Hay (January 12, 1891 – July 29, 1944) was the owner of the Canton Bulldogs from 1918 through the 1922 season. However, he is mostly recognized for organizing the first meeting of teams that would later form the American Professional Football Association, later called the National Football League (NFL).

== Car salesman ==
Hay attended high school in Canton, Ohio. Following graduation, at age 18, went to work as an automobile salesman for a local dealership. After several years selling cars, Hay went into the car business for himself. He set up the Ralph E. Hay Motor Company, and sold Jordan Hupmobiles and Pierce-Arrows. Hay became one of the most successful automobile dealers in the state of Ohio.

== Canton Bulldogs ==
In 1918, at the age of 27, Hay acquired the Canton Bulldogs from Jack Cusack, when Cusack decided to return to Oklahoma and compete in the oil industry. Hay had planned to use the team to help promote his car business and pursue his love of football. At the time the Bulldogs were the top team in the unofficial "Ohio League", winning championships in 1916 and 1917. The team did not compete much in 1918 due to manning issues related to the United States involvement in World War I. However, in 1919, the Bulldogs again won the championship.

Despite winning a championship, the Bulldogs did not draw well. Not enough fans came to games to pay for the high-priced salaries owed to the players. Hay lost money. To combat the increasing salaries, as well as the issue of players jumping from team to team, Hay sought to form a league. The league idea came from Canton's star halfback, Jim Thorpe, who in turn heard the idea from Rochester Jeffersons owner Leo Lyons during a 1917 match between the Bulldogs and the Jeffs.

== Formation of the NFL ==
On Friday, August 20, 1920, Hay met in Canton with the managers of the Akron Pros, Cleveland Tigers, and Dayton Triangles to form the American Professional Football Conference. The Akron delegation consisted of Frank Nied and Art Ranney. While Jimmy O'Donnell and Stan Cofall represented Cleveland, and Carl Storck Dayton. At the meeting Hay was elected secretary of the league. He then wrote to every important pro team in the Midwest, including George Halas manager of the Decatur Staleys, inviting them to meet in Canton on Friday, September 17, 1920, at 8:00 pm.

Representatives from ten pro teams showed up. Because Hay's office was too small, the meeting was held in his automobile showroom. Some of the owners sat on car running boards due to a lack of seats. The resulting organization operated for two years as the American Professional Football Association before its name was changed to the National Football League in 1922. The ten original franchises were from four states. The Akron Pros, Canton Bulldogs, Cleveland Tigers, and Dayton Triangles from Ohio; the Hammond Pros and Muncie Flyers from Indiana; the Rochester Jeffersons from New York; and the Rock Island Independents, Decatur Staleys, and Racine Cardinals from Illinois. Four other franchises the Buffalo All-Americans, Chicago Tigers, Columbus Panhandles, and Detroit Heralds would join the league later that year. Hay was asked to become the league's president, however he suggested that Jim Thorpe take the position on the belief that his fame would enhance the league.

== Bulldogs in the NFL ==
Hay built a strong team in Canton during the early 1920s, signing three future Hall of Famers in tackle Wilbur Henry, tackle Roy "Link" Lyman, and end Guy Chamberlin. When Chamberlin took over as coach in 1922 from Cap Edwards, the Bulldogs went undefeated and won the NFL championship. However, Hay continued to lose money with the Bulldogs. Before the 1923 season, he sold the team to a group of local businessmen. The Bulldogs went on to win the 1923 NFL Championship and became the first NFL team to win back-to-back league titles.

== Legacy ==
On April 27, 1961, Canton was selected by the NFL as the site for the Pro Football Hall of Fame. The efforts of Hay and the Bulldogs were offered as proof for the shrine to be located in Canton. While Hay has not yet been enshrined in the Hall, the city of Canton put up a plaque on the Bow Federal building in downtown Canton, the site where Ralph's automobile showroom once stood. The plaque recognizes Ralph Hay and Jim Thorpe, and the historic meeting on September 17, 1920, that saw the birth of the NFL. In 1972, the Pro Football Hall of Fame created the Ralph Hay Pioneer Award which honors those who have made innovative contributions throughout pro football history. In 1988, the Professional Football Researchers Association established the Ralph Hay Award which is awarded for "lifetime achievement in pro football research and historiography." In 2020, Hay was named a finalist for that year's class of the Pro Football Hall of Fame as a contributor for the first time, but was not elected. He was named a semifinalist in 2022, and a finalist again for the 2025 class.

== Family ==
Hay was married to Esther Becker, who had previously served as his secretary. They had one daughter. She lived to have multiple children. The family's generation is still going as of today.

Preceded by Jack Cusack	Owner of the Canton Bulldogs; 1918–1923	Succeeded by Canton Athletic Company
