= Mark Devlin (American football) =

American football player and coach (1894–1973)

Profile
- Position: Quarterback

Personal information
- Born: December 5, 1894; Lawrence, Massachusetts, U.S.
- Died: December 11, 1973 (aged 79); Lawrence, Massachusetts, U.S.
- Listed height: 5 ft 10 in (1.78 m)
- Listed weight: 180 lb (82 kg)

Career information
- College: Holy Cross; St. Ambrose

Career history
- Canton Bulldogs (1919); Rock Island Independents (1920); Cleveland Tigers (1920); New York Brickley Giants (1921)
- Stats at Pro Football Reference

Mark Henry Devlin Jr. (December 5, 1894 – December 11, 1973) was an American professional football player.

== Early life ==
Devlin was born and raised in Lawrence, Massachusetts. During World War I he served in the United States Navy. He attended and played college football and baseball at Holy Cross College. He was named captain of the football team for 1916, but left Holy Cross before the season began. He then transferred to St. Ambrose University to finish his education.

== Playing career ==
In 1919, Devlin received an offer from Jim Thorpe to play for the Canton Bulldogs. The Bulldogs went on to win the World Championship that year. Devlin then played in the American Professional Football League (which became the National Football League in 1922) with the Rock Island Independents, Cleveland Tigers and the New York Brickley Giants. He also a player-coach for a football team based in Moline, Illinois and played baseball for Lawrence in the New England League.

== Coaching ==
Devlin returned to St. Ambrose University in 1920 to coach. While at St. Ambrose, Devlin led the team to a 4–0–2 record. He also served as the school's basketball coach from 1919 to 1921. From 1921 to 1947, Devlin was the head football, baseball, and basketball coach at Lawrence High School. He led the football team to a 147-74-26 record and three state championships. He then served as the school's athletic director and facilities manager until illness forced him to retire in 1958.

== Later life and legacy ==
Devlin spent his later years in North Andover, Massachusetts before moving to a nursing home in Lawrence. In 1965, Lawrence High School's baseball field was named after him. He died on December 11, 1973, in Lawrence.
