= Harry Harris (American football) =

American football player (1895–1969)

Profile
- Position: Blocking back

Personal information
- Born: September 10, 1895; New Plymouth, Ohio, U.S.
- Died: March 1969; Martins Ferry, Ohio, U.S.
- Listed height: 5 ft 9 in (1.75 m)
- Listed weight: 175 lb (79 kg)

Career information
- College: West Virginia Wesleyan, West Virginia

Career history
- Akron Pros (1920)

Awards and highlights
- NFL champion (1920)

Career statistics
- Games played: 11
- Touchdowns: 2
- Stats at Pro Football Reference

Harry Frank Harris (September 10, 1895 – March 1969) was an American football blocking back who played for the Akron Pros during the 1920 season, where the Pros won the first NFL Championship. He went to West Virginia Wesleyan College and West Virginia University for his college career.
