= Elgie Tobin =

American football player (1886–1953)

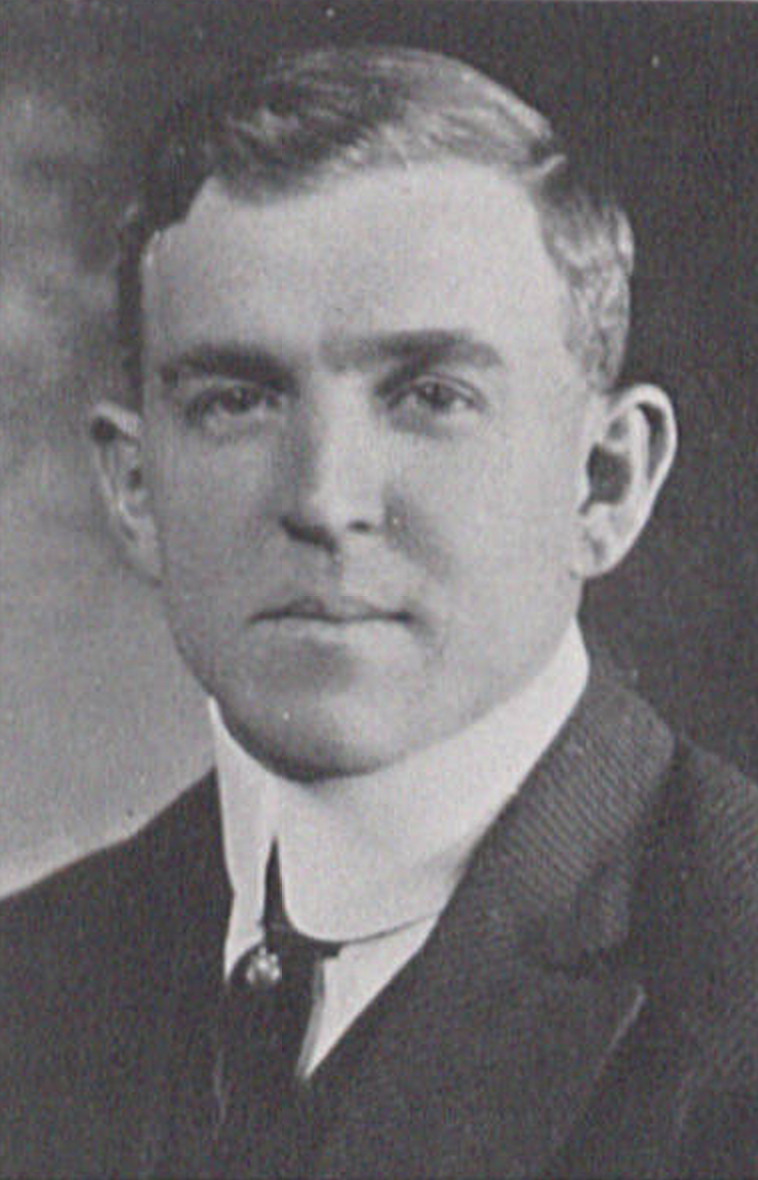
- Tobin pictured in La Vie 1915, Penn State yearbook

Profile
- Position: Blocking back

Personal information
- Born: May 7, 1886; Roscoe, Pennsylvania, U.S.
- Died: August 3, 1953 (aged 67)
- Listed height: 5 ft 9 in (1.75 m)
- Listed weight: 180 lb (82 kg)

Career information
- High school: Coal Center (PA) California
- College: West Virginia (1907); Penn State (1912–1914)

Career history

Playing
- Youngstown Patricians (1915–1919); Akron Pros (1920–1921)

Coaching
- West Virginia (1915) Assistant coach; West Virginia (1916–1917) Assistant head coach; Akron Pros (1920–1921) Head coach

Awards and highlights
- NFL champion (1920); Ohio League champion (1915)

Career statistics
- Games played: 9
- Games started: 2
- Stats at Pro Football Reference

Head coaching record
- Career: 16–3–4 (.783)
- Coaching profile at Pro Football Reference

Elza Williams "Elgie" Tobin (May 7, 1886 – September 3, 1953) was an American professional football player with the independent Youngstown Patricians, and a player-coach with the Akron Pros of the American Professional Football Association (renamed the National Football League in 1922) where he wore number 8.

== Biography ==
Prior to playing professional football, Tobin played college football at Pennsylvania State University and West Virginia University. He lettered in football for the Mountaineers in 1907. At Penn State, where records list him as "Yegg Tobin", he lettered for three years (1912, 1913, 1914). The 1912 Penn State team compiled a record of 8-0, and has retroactively been recognized as national champion by the National Championship Foundation, though most other selectors have named the 9-0 Harvard team as national champion. He was team captain of the 1914 Penn State team.

Tobin played with Patricians from 1915 until 1919, while serving as an assistant coach for West Virginia. When the Patricians folded, Tobin joined the Akron Pros of the newly formed AFPA. In 1920, Tobin coached the Pros to a record of 8 wins, 0 losses and 3 ties, winning the first ever NFL Championship. The very next season, he split the team's coaching duties with Fritz Pollard, making Pollard the first African-American coach in the NFL. The 1921 Akron Pros started the year 7–0, but finished in third place with an 8–3–1 record.

Tobin left the Pros after 1921 and was slated to coach a new Youngstown team in the National Football League, but the project died in the planning stages. He later served as player-coach of the semi-professional Elco Sterlings and worked at Republic Steel.

Including his time as co-head coach of the Pros in 1921, Tobin holds a winning percentage of .842, the highest of all APFA/NFL coaches to coach at least two seasons.
