= Frank Nied =

American football executive (1894–1969)

- Frank Nied in 1935 with a golf trophy that he donated for a tournament at J. Ed Good Park in Akron, Ohio

Profile
- Positions: Owner, Head Coach

Personal information
- Born: August 14, 1894; Akron, Ohio, U.S.
- Died: May 13, 1969 (aged 74); St. Petersburg, Florida, U.S.

Career information
- College: Akron

Career history

Coaching
- 1926: Akron Indians

owner
- 1919–1925: Akron Pros
- 1926: Akron Indians

Awards and highlights
- NFL champion (1920); National Football League co-founder (1920)
- Coaching profile at Pro Football Reference

Francis Theodore Nied (August 14, 1894 – May 13, 1969) was a founder of the American Professional Football Association (later renamed the National Football League in 1922), as well as the owner of the Akron Pros and, as the team became known as in 1926, the Akron Indians.

== Cigar business ==
Nied lived in Akron on South College Street and operated a cigar store in the six-story Hamilton Building at Main and Mill streets. It was a gathering place for athletes and fans, and filled with sports memorabilia and photos. The building was demolished in 1929 to make room for the 28-story building now known as FirstMerit Tower. Nied reopened the cigar store in the new building, but closed out his interests in 1947, selling to drugstore owner William J. Balaun.

Nied retired to St. Petersburg, Florida, where he reportedly died there in 1955 at the age of 61. However, the date of his death is listed by Pro Football Reference as being much later, May 13, 1969.

== Purchasing the Indians ==
After experiencing financial losses from 1912 to 1919, The Akron Indians was sold to Nied and Art Ranney, an Akron businessman and former football player at the University of Akron. The 1919 Indians finished the season 5-5-0 and lost money despite the presence of one of the country's best breakaway runners, Fritz Pollard. The new owners soon dropped the Indian moniker and adopted the new name the "Akron Pros," hoping to inspire better results, or at least better attendance. The team's home field Akron's League Park was laid out by Nied's father, Lew, in 1906 at the corner of Carroll and Beaver streets.

== Founding of the NFL ==
Ranney and Nied attended the August 20, 1920 and September 17, 1920, meeting that set up the NFL. The minutes for the September 17, 1920 meeting were kept on the stationery of the Akron Pros football team by Ranney, who was then elected secretary-treasurer of the league.

== 1920 Championship ==
The Pros won the very first APFA championship. In April 1921 the league voted to award the title and the Brunswick-Balke Collender Cup to Akron on the basis of an undefeated record and only 7 points allowed in 9 games. the decision was protested by the Decatur Staleys and the Buffalo All-Americans, who had tied Akron during the season. Nied and Ranney picked up the trophy and, according to league records, gave congratulatory speeches.

== Coaching career ==
After a third-place finish in 1921, the Pros began to decline. In 1926, their name was changed back to the Indians, but that didn't help. Nied coached the team for 6 games that ended in a dismal 1-3-2 record. Due to financial issues, Nied suspended team operations in 1927 and surrendered the franchise the following year.

== Race and the NFL ==
In the 1940s, Fritz Pollard alleged that several of the owners attempted to raise the issue of a color barrier in pro football. According to Pollard, Doc Young of the Hammond Pros as well as Akron's Nied and Ranney refused to allow the discussion to take place. They could not understand why a player could not be considered a player without his color being brought into account.

Pollard also stated that Nied and Ranney befriended him and feared for his safety as an African-American. Nied would allow Pollard to dress for home games at his cigar store and drive him to and from the game. Nied also made Pollard the first African-American coach in the NFL. Pollard states that Nied told every Akron player "that if they didn't want to listen to me, they could leave right then."
