= Brunswick-Balke-Collender Cup =

Gridiron football award

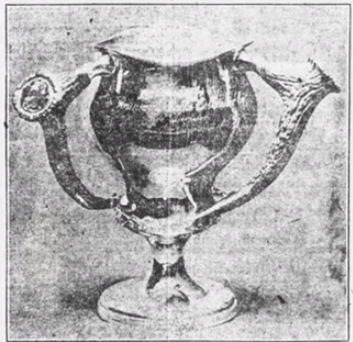
- The only known photo of the Cup prior to its disappearance.
- Awarded for: Being named the APFA champions
- Sponsored by: Brunswick-Balke-Collender Company
- Location: Unknown
- Country: United States
- Presented by: American Professional Football Association

History
- First award: 1920
- Final award: 1920
- Most recent: Akron Pros

Brunswick-Balke-Collender Cup was a silver trophy donated to the American Professional Football Association (renamed the National Football League in 1922) by the Brunswick-Balke-Collender Company, Tire Division.

== History ==
According to the September 17, 1920, founding meeting minutes of the NFL–APFA, the trophy was a silver loving cup, donated to the Association by a "Mr. Marshall". It was then to be presented to the team "awarded championship by the Association". This wording established the precedent for the 1920 season of awarding the title by a vote of the league's managers, rather than who finished at the top of the standings. The minutes also state that "any team winning the cup three times should be adjudged the owner [of the trophy]". The motion to include the cup as the Association's trophy was moved and seconded and a vote of thanks was extended by the secretary to "Mr. Marshall".

The Akron Pros were awarded the 1920 APFA Championship on April 30, 1921, during an association meeting at the Portage Hotel after posting an 8–0–3 record. The trophy was awarded to the team owners, Art Ranney and Frank Nied, by former Penn State star Timmy Bryant. However, disputes arose from the Buffalo All-Americans and the Decatur Staleys (renamed the Chicago Bears in 1922), who had been tied, but not beaten, by the Pros that year, and from allegations that Ranney, who was presiding over the meeting because of the absences of President Jim Thorpe and Vice President Stan Cofall, had a self-dealing conflict of interest in presiding over the decision to give the championship to his own team. Even though the Pros were given the trophy in 1920, the league lost track of the event and for a long time published in its own record books that the 1920 championship was undecided. Neither the All-Americans nor the Staleys, who disputed the 1921 title, inquired of the trophy's whereabouts the next year (the All-Americans commissioned their own trophies, small gold footballs, before the dispute was ruled in the Staleys' favor). It took until the 1970s for the NFL to rediscover its early vote on awarding the Akron Pros the 1920 championship.

What happened to the cup afterwards remains a mystery. The minutes of APFA and NFL meetings never mention it again. Aside from its description as "a silver loving cup", the Brunswick-Balke-Collender trophy remains a mysterious object. The only known visual depiction of the trophy is a picture that appeared in two newspapers from the era.

== Replacement ==
Starting with the 1934 Championship game, 13 years after the original was awarded, a replacement trophy was finally commissioned, and the league's championship team from that season onward received the Ed Thorp Memorial Trophy. The trophy was named after Ed Thorp, a noted referee, rules expert, and sporting goods dealer. Thorp died in 1934, and a large, traveling trophy was made that year, passed along from champion to champion each season with each championship team's name inscribed on it (just like its predecessor). Teams would also receive a replica trophy that would not have only the name of that team engraved on it. The trophy was long thought to have been awarded last to the Minnesota Vikings in 1969. Afterwards the Ed Thorp Memorial Trophy went missing, just like its predecessor nearly 50 years earlier. The original Ed Thorp trophy was eventually found in the possession of the Green Bay Packers Hall of Fame, and also includes the team names of all of the winners through the 1967 Packers (who won Super Bowl II), raising doubts as to whether the Vikings (or the Baltimore Colts, who had won the NFL title in 1968) had ever won the trophy. The Vikings did win a trophy for their 1969 championship, but surviving evidence released in 2020 suggests it was yet another trophy.

Since 1970, the league has issued the Vince Lombardi Trophy to the winners of the league's title; unlike its two predecessors, a new one is produced each year. (The Lombardi Trophy dates to 1967 and the first Super Bowl, and was retained when the NFL and the American Football League merged).

== See also ==
- List of National Football League awards
