= Cleveland Tigers (NFL) =

National Football League team, which was renamed as the Cleveland Indians in 1921

General information
- Founded: 1916
- Folded: 1921
- Stadium: League Park
- Headquartered: Cleveland, Ohio, United States
- Colors: Red, white

Personnel
- Owners: Peggy Parratt (1916); Jimmy O'Donnell (1920–1921)
- General manager: Stan Cofall
- Head coach: Peggy Parratt (1916); Stan Cofall, Al Pierotti (1920); Jim Thorpe (1921)

Team history
- Cleveland Indians (1916–1919); Cleveland Tigers (1919–1920); Cleveland Indians (1921–1921)

League / conference affiliations
- Ohio League (1916–1919); American Professional Football Association (1920–1921)

The Cleveland Tigers were the first Cleveland team franchise in what became the National Football League (NFL). The Tigers played in the "Ohio League" before joining the American Professional Football Association (later renamed the National Football League in 1922) during the 1920 and 1921 seasons.

== History ==
The Cleveland Indians football team was originally established in 1916 and played in the Ohio League. The team was formed after the Massillon Tigers raided the Akron Indians roster in 1915 and took away many of their star players. That year Peggy Parratt, the Akron Indians player-coach formed the Cleveland Indians with several former ex-Akron Indians players and a few new ex-college players. Despite a winning record, the 1916 Indians season was disappointing, losing twice to the Canton Bulldogs, who were led by Jim Thorpe, and splitting a pair of games with the Columbus Panhandles.

In 1920, when owners of professional teams organized a more structured league, Jimmy O'Donnell, a local sports promoter, obtained the Cleveland franchise. O'Donnell, also the owner of a semi-pro baseball team called the Tigers, was aided in his football venture by Stan Cofall, a football star at Notre Dame from 1914 to 1916, and with the Massillon Tigers. Cofall helped re-organize the Cleveland team in 1919 and, along with O'Donnell attended the September 1920 meeting in Canton, Ohio that founded the American Professional Football Association, which became the NFL the following year. For the first half of the 1920 season, Cofall was the Tigers' player-coach; he was also elected vice-president of the new league.

In their first season, the Cleveland Tigers scored only 2 touchdowns and lost 3 games by 7–0 scores, compiling a record of 1–4–2. For the 1921 season, the name of the team was changed to the Indians, partly because it was a stock name in Cleveland (a baseball team had also used the name since 1915) but more because three Native Americans were signed away from the Canton Bulldogs. In 1921 the Tigers returned with two future Hall of Famers, Joe Guyon and player-coach Jim Thorpe. The team won its first two games. However, during the team's second game, Thorpe injured his ribs and was lost for the season. The Tigers then narrowly lost the next four games. When Thorpe returned to action in a postseason game against the New York Brickley Giants in December, the Tigers were again victorious.

Early in 1922, O'Donnell received league permission to suspend operations for a year, but when he could not post the $1,000 annual guarantee the NFL required, his franchise was canceled. Guyon and Thorpe went off to LaRue, Ohio to form the Oorang Indians. A new Indians franchise was later purchased by Samuel Deutsch who operated the team in 1923. He then relocated the Canton Bulldogs to Cleveland in 1924 and merged them with his Indians team. A third, unrelated Indians team also played in the NFL in 1931.

== Pro Football Hall of Famers ==
Cleveland Tigers/Indians Hall of Famers
Players
| No. | Name | Position | Tenure | Inducted |
|---|---|---|---|---|
| — | Joe Guyon | T/HB | 1921 | 1966 |
| — | Jim Thorpe | Back | 1921 | 1963 |

== Season-by-season ==
| Year | W | L | T | Finish | Coach |
|---|---|---|---|---|---|
Cleveland Tigers
| 1920 | 2 | 4 | 2 | 10th | Stan Cofall, Al Pierotti |
Cleveland Indians
| 1921 | 3 | 5 | 0 | 11th | Jim Thorpe |
| Totals | 5 | 9 | 2 | | |
