= National Football League =

Professional American football league

- Current season, competition or edition: 2026 NFL season
- Formerly: American Professional Football Conference (1920); American Professional Football Association (1920–1921)
- Sport: American football
- Founded: September 17, 1920 (106 years ago); Canton, Ohio, U.S.
- First season: 1920
- Commissioner: Roger Goodell
- No. of teams: 32
- Country: United States (Note: All teams are based in the United States, but several preseason and regular season games have been held internationally.)
- Headquarters: 345 Park Avenue; New York City, New York, U.S.
- Most recent champions: Seattle Seahawks (2nd title)
- Most titles: Green Bay Packers (13 titles)
- Broadcasters: United States: CBS; Fox; NBC; ESPN/ABC/ESPN2/NFL Network; Westwood One; Canada: TSN/RDS/CTV; International: See list
- Streaming partners: United States: Paramount+ Fox One; Peacock; ESPN app/NFL+ Amazon Prime Video/Twitch; Netflix; YouTube TV; Canada: Crave; DAZN; International: DAZN
- Website: www.nfl.com

The National Football League (NFL) is a professional American football league in the United States. Composed of 32 teams, it is divided equally between the American Football Conference (AFC) and the National Football Conference (NFC). The NFL is one of the major professional sports leagues in the United States and Canada and is the premier American football league in the world. Each NFL season begins annually with a three-week preseason in August, followed by an 18-week regular season, which runs from early September to early January, with each team playing 17 games and having one bye week. Seven teams from each conference, including the four division winners and three wild card teams, then advance to the playoffs, a single-elimination tournament, which culminates in the Super Bowl, played in early February between the winners of the AFC and NFC championship games. The NFL is headquartered in New York City.

The NFL was formed in 1920 as the American Professional Football Association (APFA) before renaming itself the National Football League for the 1922 season. After initially determining champions through end-of-season standings, a playoff system was implemented in 1933 that culminated with the NFL Championship Game until 1966. Following an agreement to merge the NFL with the rival American Football League (AFL), the Super Bowl was first held in 1967 to determine a champion between the best teams from the two leagues and has remained as the final game of each NFL season since the merger was completed in 1970. The NFL is the wealthiest professional sports league in the world by revenue, and the sports league with the most valuable teams. The NFL also has the highest average attendance (67,591) of any professional sports league in the world and is the most popular sports league in the United States. The Super Bowl is also among the most-watched sporting events in the world, with the individual games accounting for many of the most watched television programs in American history and occupying the top five of Nielsen's all-time most-watched U.S. television broadcasts by 2015.

The Green Bay Packers hold the most overall NFL championships with thirteen, winning nine titles before the Super Bowl era and four Super Bowls afterwards. Since the creation of the Super Bowl, the New England Patriots and Pittsburgh Steelers are tied for the most victories with six each. The reigning Super Bowl champions are the Seattle Seahawks.

== History ==
=== Founding and history ===
On August 20, 1920, a meeting was held by representatives of the Akron Pros, Canton Bulldogs, Cleveland Indians, and Dayton Triangles at the Jordan and Hupmobile auto showroom in Canton, Ohio. This meeting resulted in the formation of the American Professional Football Conference (APFC), a group who, according to the Canton Evening Repository, intended to "raise the standard of professional football in every way possible, to eliminate bidding for players between rival clubs and to secure cooperation in the formation of schedules".

A second meeting was held on September 17, 1920, by George Halas, Ralph Hay, Frank Nied, and Carl Storck, with representatives from teams within four states: Akron, Canton, Cleveland, and Dayton from Ohio; the Hammond Pros and Muncie Flyers from Indiana; the Rochester Jeffersons from New York; and the Rock Island Independents, Decatur Staleys, and Racine (Chicago) Cardinals from Illinois. The league was renamed to the American Professional Football Association (APFA). The league elected Jim Thorpe as its first president, and consisted of 14 teams (the Buffalo All-Americans, Chicago Tigers, Columbus Panhandles and Detroit Heralds joined the league during the year). The Massillon Tigers from Massillon, Ohio, was also at the September 17 meeting, but did not field a team in 1920. Only two of these teams, the Decatur Staleys (now the Chicago Bears) and the Chicago Cardinals (now the Arizona Cardinals), remain in the NFL.

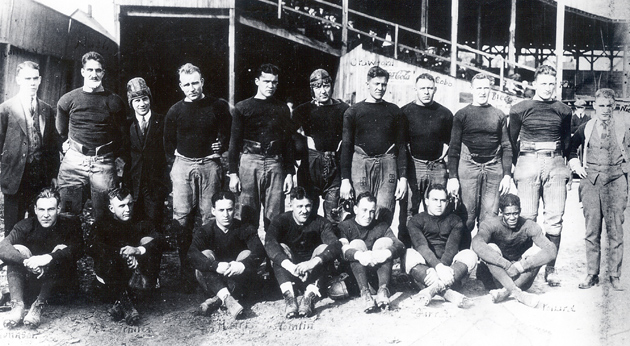
The Akron Pros won the first APFA (NFL) Championship in 1920.

Although the league did not maintain official standings for its 1920 inaugural season and teams played schedules that included non-league opponents, the APFA awarded the Akron Pros the championship by virtue of their 8–0–3 record. The first event occurred on September 26, 1920, when the Rock Island Independents defeated the non-league St. Paul Ideals 48–0 at Douglas Park. On October 3, 1920, the first full week of league play occurred. The following season resulted in the Chicago Staleys controversially winning the title over the Buffalo All-Americans. On June 24, 1922, the APFA changed its name to the National Football League (NFL).

In 1932, the season ended with the Chicago Bears (6–1–6) and the Portsmouth Spartans (6–1–4) tied for first in the league standings. At the time, teams were ranked on a single table and the team with the highest winning percentage (not including ties, which were not counted towards the standings) at the end of the season was declared the champion; the only tiebreaker was that in the event of a tie if two teams played twice in a season, the result of the second game determined the title (the source of the 1921 controversy). This method had been used since the league's creation in 1920, but no situation had been encountered where two teams were tied for first. The league quickly determined that a playoff game between Chicago and Portsmouth was needed to decide the league's champion. The teams were originally scheduled to play the playoff game, officially a regular-season game that would count towards the regular season standings, at Wrigley Field in Chicago, but a combination of heavy snow and extreme cold forced the game to be moved indoors to Chicago Stadium, which did not have a regulation-size football field. Playing with altered rules to accommodate the smaller playing field, the Bears won the game 9–0 and thus won the championship. Fan interest in the de facto championship game led the NFL, beginning in 1933, to split into two divisions with a championship game to be played between the division champions. The 1934 season also marked the first of twelve seasons in which African Americans were absent from the league. The de facto ban was rescinded in 1946, following public pressure and coinciding with the removal of a similar ban in Major League Baseball.

Although the NFL was always the largest professional football league in the United States, it faced numerous rival professional leagues during the 1930s and 1940s. Rival leagues included at least three separate American Football Leagues and the All-America Football Conference (AAFC), on top of various regional leagues of varying caliber. Three NFL teams trace their histories to these rival leagues; the Los Angeles Rams who came from a 1936 iteration of the American Football League, and the Cleveland Browns and San Francisco 49ers, both from the AAFC. By the 1950s, the NFL had an effective monopoly on professional football in the United States; its only competition in North America was the professional Canadian football circuit, which formally became the Canadian Football League (CFL) in 1958. With Canadian football being a different football code than the American game, the CFL established a niche market in Canada and still survives as an independent league.

A new professional league, the fourth American Football League (AFL), began to play in 1960. The upstart AFL began to challenge the established NFL in popularity, gaining lucrative television contracts and engaging in a bidding war with the NFL for free agents and draft picks. The two leagues announced a merger on June 8, 1966, to take full effect in 1970. In the meantime, the leagues would hold a common draft and championship game. The game, the Super Bowl, was held four times before the merger, with the NFL winning Super Bowl I and Super Bowl II, and the AFL winning Super Bowl III and Super Bowl IV. After the league merged, it was reorganized into two conferences: the National Football Conference (NFC), consisting of most of the pre-merger NFL teams, and the American Football Conference (AFC), consisting of all of the AFL teams as well as three pre-merger NFL teams.

Today, the NFL is the most popular sports league in North America – with much of the league's growth and popularity attributable to former commissioner Pete Rozelle, who led the league from 1960 to 1989. Overall annual attendance increased from 3 million at the beginning of his tenure to 17 million by the end of his tenure, and 400 million global viewers watched 1989's Super Bowl XXIII. The NFL established NFL Properties in 1963. The league's licensing wing, NFL Properties, earns the league billions of dollars annually; Rozelle's tenure also marked the creation of NFL Charities and a national partnership with United Way. Paul Tagliabue was elected as commissioner to succeed Rozelle; his 17-year tenure, which ended in 2006, was marked by large increases in television contracts and the addition of four expansion teams, as well as the introduction of league initiatives to increase the number of minorities in league and team management roles.

The league's current commissioner, Roger Goodell, has focused on reducing the number of illegal hits and making the sport safer, mainly through fining or suspending players who break rules. These actions are among many the NFL is taking to reduce concussions and improve player safety. Prior to 2021, the NFL had utilized race-based adjustments of dementia claims in the $1 billion settlement of concussion claims, which had been criticized by critics before the NFL decided to end what was called "race-norming". On May 21, 2024, the NFL announced the NFL Source initiative, aimed at increasing the number of minority and women-owned businesses that work with the league throughout the year. NFL Source will be mandatory for teams that host major events, such as the Super Bowl and the NFL Draft, and their organizing committees, but will be optional for other contracts at the team level. The NFL will partner with the U.S. Black Chambers, Inc to help local businesses across the country obtain the certifications necessary to do business with the league in furtherance of its efforts to increase partnerships with certified and underrepresented businesses that are 51% owned and operated or led by a veteran, woman, minority, person with disabilities, or LGBTQ+ individual.

In 2015, a class-action lawsuit was filed on behalf of NFL Sunday Ticket subscribers, alleging that the NFL, its member teams, its broadcast partners, and DirecTV engaged in a conspiracy to violate antitrust law, by granting DirecTV exclusive rights to sell the Sunday Ticket product, thereby restricting competition and forcing viewers to pay supercompetitive prices to view out-of-market games. On June 27, 2024, a jury in Los Angeles found that the NFL had violated antitrust law in setting the price of the Sunday ticket package and ordered a penalty totaling more than $4.7 billion. With triple damages allowed under federal antitrust laws, the NFL could ultimately be liable for $14.39 billion. The league said it would ask the judge to set the verdict aside then appeal the verdict if needed.

=== Season and playoff development ===
From 1920 to 1934, the NFL did not have a set number of games for teams to play, instead setting a minimum. The league mandated a twelve-game regular season for each team beginning in 1935, later shortening this to eleven games in 1937 and ten games in 1943, mainly due to World War II. After the war ended, the number of games returned to eleven games in 1946, and later back to twelve in 1947. The NFL went to a 14-game schedule in 1961, which it retained until switching to a 16-game schedule in 1978. In March 2021, the NFL officially adopted a 17-game schedule after gaining the agreement of the National Football League Players Association (NFLPA).

Having an odd number of games in the schedule will give half the teams nine games as the home team, while half the teams have only eight home games. To minimize the perceived benefit on competition of having more home games, the extra home game will be rotated between the two conferences each year. This is because playoff berths are allocated at the conference level, so all teams within the conference will have played the same number of home games.

The NFL operated in a two-conference system from 1933 to 1966, where the champions of each conference would meet in the NFL Championship Game. If two teams tied for the conference lead, they would meet in a one-game playoff to determine the conference champion. In 1967, the NFL expanded from 15 teams to 16 teams. Instead of just evening out the conferences by adding the expansion New Orleans Saints to the seven-member Western Conference, the NFL realigned the conferences and split each into two four-team divisions. The four division champions would meet in the NFL playoffs, a two-round playoff. The NFL also operated the Playoff Bowl (officially the Bert Bell Benefit Bowl) from 1960 to 1969. Effectively, a third-place game, pitting the two conference runners-up against each other, the league considers Playoff Bowls to have been exhibitions rather than playoff games. The league discontinued the Playoff Bowl in 1970 due to its perception as a game for losers.

Following the addition of the former AFL teams into the NFL in 1970, the NFL split into two conferences with three divisions each. The expanded league, now with twenty-six teams, would also feature an expanded eight-team playoff, the participants being the three division champions from each conference as well as one 'wild card' team (the team with the best win percentage that did not win its division) from each conference. In 1978, the league added a second wild card team from each conference, bringing the total number of playoff teams to ten, and a further two wild card teams were added in 1990 to bring the total to twelve. When the NFL expanded to 32 teams in 2002, the league realigned, changing the division structure from three divisions in each conference to four divisions in each conference. As each division champion gets a playoff bid, the number of wild card teams from each conference dropped from three to two. The playoffs expanded again in 2020, adding two more wild card teams to bring the total to 14 playoff teams.

== Teams ==
The NFL consists of 32 teams divided into two conferences of 16 teams each. Each conference is divided into four divisions of four teams each. During the regular season, each team is allowed a maximum of 55 players on its roster; only 48 of these may be active (eligible to play) on game days. Each team can also have a sixteen-player practice squad separate from its main roster.

Each NFL club is granted a franchise, the league's authorization for the team to operate in its home city. This franchise covers "Home Territory" (the 75 miles surrounding the city limits, or, if the team is within 100 miles of another league city, half the distance between the two cities) and "Home Marketing Area" (Home Territory plus the rest of the state the club operates in, as well as the area the team operates its training camp in for the duration of the camp). Each NFL member has the exclusive right to host professional football games inside its Home Territory and the exclusive right to advertise, promote, and host events in its Home Marketing Area. There are a couple of exceptions to this rule, mostly relating to teams with close proximity to each other: teams that operate in the same city (e.g. New York City and Los Angeles) or the same state (e.g. California, Florida, and Texas) share the rights to the city's Home Territory and the state's Home Marketing Area, respectively.

The Dallas Cowboys, valued at $12.8 billion, are the most valuable sport franchise in the world as of 2025 according to Sportico. The average NFL team is worth $7.13 billion and collectively worth $228 billion.

Key
Symbol	Meaning
*	Franchise has relocated at some point in its existence
†	Club was a founding member of the NFL

National Football League teams
Conference	Division	Team	City	Stadium	Capacity	First season	Head coach
AFC	East	Buffalo Bills	Orchard Park, New York	Highmark Stadium	67,000	1960 (AFL); 1970 (NFL)	Joe Brady
AFC	East	Miami Dolphins	Miami Gardens, Florida	Hard Rock Stadium	64,767	1966 (AFL); 1970 (NFL)	Jeff Hafley
AFC	East	New England Patriots	Foxborough, Massachusetts	Gillette Stadium	65,878	1960 (AFL); 1970 (NFL)	Mike Vrabel
AFC	East	New York Jets	East Rutherford, New Jersey	MetLife Stadium (Note: The New York Jets and New York Giants share MetLife Stadium.)	82,500	1960 (AFL); 1970 (NFL)	Aaron Glenn
AFC	North	Baltimore Ravens	Baltimore, Maryland	M&T Bank Stadium	71,008	1996 (Note: Due to an agreement with the city of Cleveland as part of the Cleveland Browns relocation controversy, the Browns name, colors, and team history/records were left in Cleveland, while the team, personnel, and staff were allowed to move to Baltimore which was considered a new franchise. As such, the Ravens are considered to have begun play in 1996 while the current Cleveland Browns are considered to have been founded in 1946, joined the NFL in 1950, became inactive from 1996 to 1998, and resumed play in 1999.)	Jesse Minter
AFC	North	Cincinnati Bengals	Cincinnati, Ohio	Paycor Stadium	65,515	1968 (AFL); 1970 (NFL)	Zac Taylor
AFC	North	Cleveland Browns	Cleveland, Ohio	Huntington Bank Field	67,895	1946 (AAFC); 1950 (NFL)	Todd Monken
AFC	North	Pittsburgh Steelers	Pittsburgh, Pennsylvania	Acrisure Stadium	68,400	1933	Mike McCarthy
AFC	South	Houston Texans	Houston, Texas	Reliant Stadium	71,995	2002	DeMeco Ryans
AFC	South	Indianapolis Colts*	Indianapolis, Indiana	Lucas Oil Stadium	63,000	1953	Shane Steichen
AFC	South	Jacksonville Jaguars	Jacksonville, Florida	EverBank Stadium (Note: The Jacksonville Jaguars began playing one home game each season at Wembley Stadium in London, England in 2013, and will continue to do so through 2020. In 2020, the Jaguars were originally scheduled to play two home games at Wembley Stadium, but the plans were cancelled due to the COVID-19 pandemic.)	67,814	1995	Liam Coen
AFC	South	Tennessee Titans*	Nashville, Tennessee	Nissan Stadium	69,143	1960 (AFL); 1970 (NFL)	Robert Saleh
AFC	West	Denver Broncos	Denver, Colorado	Empower Field at Mile High	76,125	1960 (AFL); 1970 (NFL)	Sean Payton
AFC	West	Kansas City Chiefs*	Kansas City, Missouri	Arrowhead Stadium	76,416	1960 (AFL); 1970 (NFL)	Andy Reid
AFC	West	Las Vegas Raiders*	Paradise, Nevada	Allegiant Stadium	65,000	1960 (AFL); 1970 (NFL)	Klint Kubiak
AFC	West	Los Angeles Chargers*	Inglewood, California	SoFi Stadium (Note: The Los Angeles Chargers and Los Angeles Rams share SoFi Stadium.)	70,240	1960 (AFL); 1970 (NFL)	Jim Harbaugh
NFC	East	Dallas Cowboys	Arlington, Texas	AT&T Stadium	80,000	1960	Brian Schottenheimer
NFC	East	New York Giants	East Rutherford, New Jersey	MetLife Stadium	82,500	1925	John Harbaugh
NFC	East	Philadelphia Eagles	Philadelphia, Pennsylvania	Lincoln Financial Field	69,176	1933	Nick Sirianni
NFC	East	Washington Commanders*	Landover, Maryland	Northwest Stadium	62,000	1932	Dan Quinn
NFC	North	Chicago Bears*†	Chicago, Illinois	Soldier Field	61,500	1920	Ben Johnson
NFC	North	Detroit Lions*	Detroit, Michigan	Ford Field	65,000	1930	Dan Campbell
NFC	North	Green Bay Packers	Green Bay, Wisconsin	Lambeau Field	81,441	1919 (Note: The Packers were founded and began play in 1919. They played two seasons in 1919 and 1920 before joining the NFL (then called the APFA) for the 1921 season.); 1921 (NFL)	Matt LaFleur
NFC	North	Minnesota Vikings	Minneapolis, Minnesota	U.S. Bank Stadium	66,860	1961	Kevin O'Connell
NFC	South	Atlanta Falcons	Atlanta, Georgia	Mercedes-Benz Stadium	71,000	1966	Kevin Stefanski
NFC	South	Carolina Panthers	Charlotte, North Carolina	Bank of America Stadium	75,523	1995	Dave Canales
NFC	South	New Orleans Saints	New Orleans, Louisiana	Caesars Superdome	73,208	1967	Kellen Moore
NFC	South	Tampa Bay Buccaneers	Tampa, Florida	Raymond James Stadium	65,618	1976	Todd Bowles
NFC	West	Arizona Cardinals*†	Glendale, Arizona	State Farm Stadium	63,400	1898 (Note: The team that would become the Arizona Cardinals was founded and began play in 1898 in Chicago as the Morgan Athletic Club, later called the Racine Normals, Racine Cardinals, and Chicago Cardinals. They played nine seasons until disbanding in 1906. The team was reformed in 1913 and, excluding the 1918 season, played each year until joining the NFL (then called the APFA) in 1920. The team would later move to St. Louis and eventually to Arizona.); 1920 (NFL)	Mike LaFleur
NFC	West	Los Angeles Rams*	Inglewood, California	SoFi Stadium	70,240	1936 (AFL); 1937 (NFL)	Sean McVay
NFC	West	San Francisco 49ers	Santa Clara, California	Levi's Stadium	68,500	1946 (AAFC); 1950 (NFL)	Kyle Shanahan
NFC	West	Seattle Seahawks	Seattle, Washington	Lumen Field	69,000	1976	Mike Macdonald

== Organizational structure ==
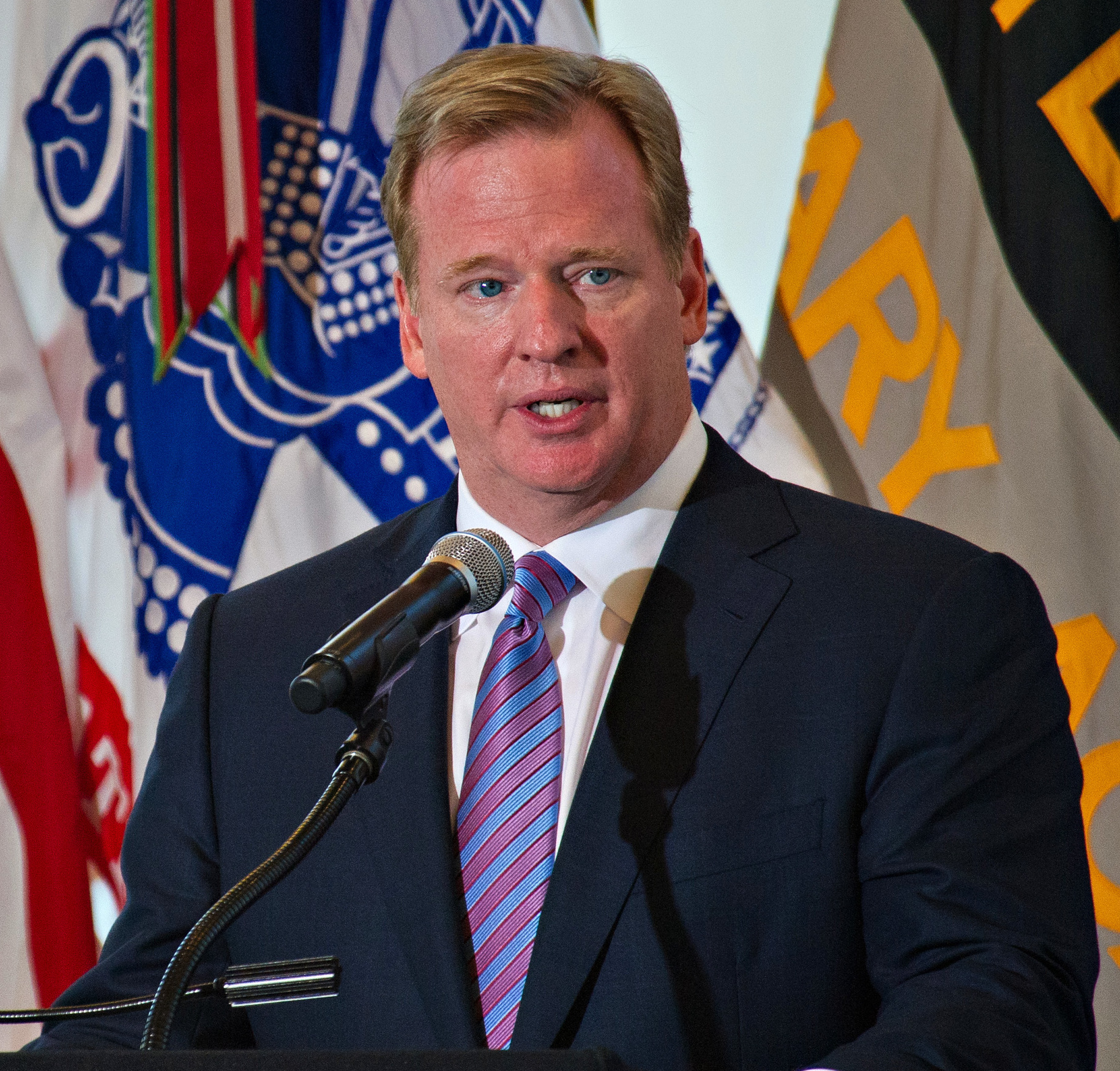
Roger Goodell, National Football League Commissioner since 2006 (pictured in 2012)

At the corporate level, the NFL considers itself a trade association made up of and financed by its 32 member teams. Up until 2015, the league was an unincorporated nonprofit 501(c)(6) association. Section 501(c)(6) of the Internal Revenue Code provides an exemption from federal income taxation for "Business leagues, chambers of commerce, real-estate boards, boards of trade, or professional football leagues (whether or not administering a pension fund for football players), not organized for profit and no part of the net earnings of which inures to the benefit of any private shareholder or individual." In contrast, each individual team, with the exception of the non-profit Green Bay Packers, is subject to tax because they make a profit.

In 2015, the NFL gave up its tax-exempt status following public criticism; in a letter to the club owners, Commissioner Roger Goodell labeled it a "distraction", saying "the effects of the tax-exempt status of the league office have been mischaracterized repeatedly in recent years... Every dollar of income generated through television rights fees, licensing agreements, sponsorships, ticket sales, and other means is earned by the 32 clubs and is taxable there. This will remain the case even when the league office and Management Council file returns as taxable entities, and the change in filing status will make no material difference to our business." As a result, the league office might owe around US$10 million in income taxes, but it is no longer required to disclose the salaries of its executive officers.

The league has three defined officers: the commissioner, secretary, and treasurer. Each conference has one defined officer, the president, which is essentially an honorary position with few powers and mostly ceremonial duties, including awarding the conference championship trophy.

The commissioner is elected by the affirmative vote of two-thirds or 18, whichever is greater, of the members of the league, while the president of each conference is elected by an affirmative vote of three-fourths or 10, whichever is greater, of the conference members. The commissioner appoints the secretary and treasurer and has broad authority in disputes between clubs, players, coaches, and employees. He is the "principal executive officer" of the NFL and also has authority in hiring league employees, negotiating television contracts, disciplining individuals that own part or all of an NFL team, clubs, or employed individuals of an NFL club if they have violated league by-laws or committed "conduct detrimental to the welfare of the League or professional football". The commissioner can, in the event of misconduct by a party associated with the league, suspend individuals, hand down a fine of up to US$500,000, cancel contracts with the league, and award or strip teams of draft picks.

In extreme cases, the commissioner can offer recommendations to the NFL's executive committee, up to and including the "cancellation or forfeiture" of a club's franchise or any other action, he deems necessary. The commissioner can also issue sanctions up to and including a lifetime ban from the league if an individual connected to the NFL has bet on games or failed to notify the league of conspiracies or plans to bet on or fix games. The current commissioner is Roger Goodell, who was elected in 2006 after Paul Tagliabue, the previous commissioner, retired.

=== Finances ===
The NFL's revenue is from three primary sources: NFL Ventures (merchandising), NFL Enterprises (NFL Network and NFL Sunday Ticket, which the league controls), and the television contracts. The league distributes such revenue equally among the teams, regardless of their performance. As of February 2019, each team received $255 million annually from the league's television contract, up 150% from $99.9 million in 2010.

Most NFL teams' financial statements are secret. The Kansas City Star obtained the Kansas City Chiefs' tax returns for 2008–2010. According to the Star, the team's revenue rose from $231 million in 2008 to $302 million in 2010. In 2010, two thirds of revenue came from the league: $99.8 million from NFL Ventures ($55.3 million) and NFL Enterprises ($44.6 million), and the $99.9 million share of the television contract. The remaining one third was from tickets ($42.4 million), corporate sponsorships ($6.6 million), food sales ($5 million), parking passes ($4.7 million), in-stadium advertising ($3.7 million), radio contract ($2.7 million), and miscellaneous sources. The largest Chiefs expense in 2010 was $148 million for players, coaches, and other employees. Of the $38 million in operating income, Clark Hunt, Lamar Hunt Jr., two other children, and the widow of former team owner Lamar Hunt divided $17.6 million, and reinvested the remaining $20 million into the team.

According to economist Richard D. Wolff, the NFL's revenue model is in contravention of the typical corporate structure. By redistributing profits to all teams the NFL is ensuring that one team will not dominate the league through excessive earnings. Roger Noll described the revenue sharing as the league's "most important structural weakness", as there is no disincentive against a team playing badly and the largest cost item, player salaries, is capped.

== Season format ==
The NFL season format consists of a three-week preseason, an 18-week regular season (each team plays 17 games), and a 14-team single-elimination playoff culminating in the Super Bowl, the league's championship game.

=== Preseason ===
The NFL preseason begins with the Pro Football Hall of Fame Game, played at Tom Benson Hall of Fame Stadium in Canton, Ohio. Each NFL team is required to schedule three preseason games. NFC teams must play at least two of these at home in odd numbered years and AFC teams must play at least two at home in even numbered years. However, the teams involved in the Hall of Fame game, as well as any team that played in an American Bowl game, play four preseason games. Preseason games are exhibition matches and do not count towards regular-season totals. Because the preseason does not count towards standings, teams generally do not focus on winning games; instead, they are used by coaches to evaluate their teams and by players to show their performance, both to their current team and to other teams if they get cut. The quality of preseason games has been criticized by some fans, who dislike having to pay full price for exhibition games, as well as by some players and coaches, who dislike the risk of injury the games have, while others have felt the preseason is a necessary part of the NFL schedule.

=== Regular season ===
2024 AFC team standings
POS	AFC East	AFC North	AFC South	AFC West
1st	Bills	Ravens	Texans	Chiefs
2nd	Dolphins	Steelers	Colts	Chargers
3rd	Jets	Bengals	Jaguars	Broncos
4th	Patriots	Browns	Titans	Raiders

2024 NFC team standings
POS	NFC East	NFC North	NFC South	NFC West
1st	Eagles	Lions	Buccaneers	Rams
2nd	Commanders	Vikings	Falcons	Seahawks
3rd	Cowboys	Packers	Panthers	Cardinals
4th	Giants	Bears	Saints	49ers

This chart of the 2024 season standings displays an application of the NFL scheduling formula. The 2024 Eagles (highlighted in green) finished in first place in the NFC East. Thus, in 2025, the Eagles will play two games against each of their division rivals (highlighted in light blue), one game against each team in the NFC North and AFC West (highlighted in yellow), and one game each against the first-place finishers in the NFC South, NFC West (highlighted in orange), and AFC East (highlighted in pink).

Currently, the 14 opponents each team faces over the 17-game regular season schedule are set using a predetermined formula: The league runs an 18-week, 272-game regular season. Since 2021, the season has begun the week after Labor Day (the first Monday in September) and concluded the week after New Year. The opening game of the season is normally a home game on a Thursday for the league's defending champion.

Most NFL games are played on Sundays, with at least one Monday night game and a Thursday night game occurring throughout the season, except for the final weekend. NFL games are not normally played on Fridays or Saturdays until late in the regular season, as federal law prohibits professional football leagues from competing directly with college or high school football. Because high school and college teams typically play games on Friday and Saturday, respectively, the NFL avoided holding games on those days until the Friday before the third Saturday in December. While Saturday games late in the season have been common, the league rarely held Friday games. Beginning in 2023, the NFL has held games on Black Friday, with the games being broadcast on Amazon Prime. NFL games are rarely scheduled for Tuesday or Wednesday, and those days have only been used four times since 1948: in 2010, when a Sunday game was rescheduled to Tuesday due to a blizzard; in 2012, when the Kickoff Game was moved from Thursday to Wednesday to avoid conflict with the Democratic National Convention; in 2020, when a game was postponed from Sunday to Tuesday due to players testing positive for COVID-19; and in 2026, when the Kickoff Game was moved from Thursday to Wednesday due to conflicting time-zones with an international game in Melbourne, Australia scheduled on Thursday.

NFL regular season match-ups are determined according to a scheduling formula. Teams play six games against the other three teams in their division (one home and one away each), eight games against common opponents in both another division of the same conference (rotating every three years) and one division of the other conference (rotating every four years), two extra games against the remaining two divisions of the same conference with match-ups determined by the previous season's standings (for example, if a team finishes first in its division, it will play the two remaining first-place teams in its conference), and one interconference game determined by the previous season's standings against a team in the division it last played two years prior. In total, each team plays 17 games and has one bye week, when it does not play a game.

Although a team's home and away opponents are known by the end of the previous year's regular season, the exact dates and times for NFL games are not determined until much later because the league has to account for, among other things, the Major League Baseball postseason and local events that could pose a scheduling conflict with NFL games. During the 2010 season, over 500,000 potential schedules were created by computers, 5,000 of which were considered "playable schedules" and were reviewed by the NFL's scheduling team. After arriving at what they felt was the best schedule out of the group, nearly 50 more potential schedules were developed to try to ensure that the chosen schedule would be the best possible one.

=== Postseason ===
After the regular season, the NFL Playoffs, a 14-team single-elimination tournament, is then held. Seven teams qualify from each conference: the winners of each of the four divisions as well as three wild card teams (the three remaining teams with the best overall record, with tiebreakers in the event of two or more teams having the same record). These teams are seeded according to overall record and tiebreakers, with the division champions always ranking higher than the wild card teams. The top team (seeded one) from each conference are awarded a bye week, while the remaining six teams (seeded 2–7) from each conference compete in the first round of the playoffs, the Wild Card round, with the 2-seed competing against the 7-seed, the 3-seed competing against the 6-seed and the 4-seed competing against the 5-seed. The winners of the Wild Card round advance to the Divisional Round, which matches the lower seeded team against the 1-seed and the two remaining teams against each other. The winners of those games then compete in the Conference Championships, with the higher remaining seed hosting the lower remaining seed. The AFC and NFC champions then compete in the Super Bowl to determine the league champion.

The only other postseason event hosted by the NFL is the Pro Bowl, the league's all-star game. Since 2009, the Pro Bowl has been held the week before the Super Bowl; in previous years, the game was held the week following the Super Bowl, but in an effort to boost ratings, the game was moved to the week before. Because of this, players from the teams participating in the Super Bowl are exempt from participating in the game. The Pro Bowl is not considered as competitive as a regular-season game because the biggest concern of teams is to avoid injuries to the players.

== Trophies and awards ==
=== Team trophies ===
The NFL has used three different trophies to honor its champion over its existence. The first trophy, the Brunswick-Balke-Collender Cup, was donated to the NFL (then APFA) in 1920 by the Brunswick-Balke-Collender Corporation. The trophy, the appearance of which is only known by its description as a "silver loving cup", was intended to be a traveling trophy and not to become permanent until a team had won at least three titles. The league awarded it to the Akron Pros, champions of the inaugural 1920 season. The trophy was discontinued and its current whereabouts are unknown.

A second trophy, the Ed Thorp Memorial Trophy, was issued by the NFL from 1934 to 1967. The trophy's namesake, Ed Thorp, was a referee in the league and a friend to many early league owners; upon his death in 1934, the league created the trophy to honor him. In addition to the main trophy, which would be in the possession of the current league champion, the league issued a smaller replica trophy to each champion, who would keep it. The current location of the Ed Thorp Memorial Trophy, long thought to be lost, is believed to be possessed by the Green Bay Packers Hall of Fame.

The current trophy of the NFL is the Vince Lombardi Trophy. The Super Bowl trophy was officially renamed in 1970 after Vince Lombardi, who as head coach led the Green Bay Packers to victories in the first two Super Bowls. Unlike the previous trophies, a new Vince Lombardi Trophy is given to each year's champion. Lombardi Trophies are made by Tiffany & Co. out of sterling silver. Additionally, players, coaches and personnel of the winning team are awarded Super Bowl rings to commemorate their victory. The winning team chooses the company that makes the rings; each ring design varies, with the NFL mandating certain ring specifications, including requiring the Super Bowl logo be on at least one side of the ring. The losing team are also awarded rings, which must be no more than half as valuable as the winners' rings, but those are almost never worn.

The conference champions receive trophies for their achievement. The champions of the NFC receive the George Halas Trophy, named after Chicago Bears founder George Halas, who is also considered one of the co-founders of the NFL. The AFC champions receive the Lamar Hunt Trophy, named after Lamar Hunt, the founder of the Kansas City Chiefs and the principal founder of the American Football League. Players on the winning team also receive a conference championship ring.

=== Player and coach awards ===
The NFL recognizes a number of awards for its players and coaches at its annual NFL Honors presentation. The most prestigious award is the AP Most Valuable Player (MVP) award. Other major awards include the AP Offensive Player of the Year, AP Defensive Player of the Year, AP Comeback Player of the Year, and the AP Offensive and Defensive Rookie of the Year awards. Another prestigious award is the Walter Payton Man of the Year award, which recognizes a player's off-field work in addition to his on-field performance. The NFL Coach of the Year award is the highest coaching award. The NFL also gives out weekly awards such as the FedEx Air & Ground NFL Players of the Week and the Pepsi Zero Sugar NFL Rookie of the Week awards.

== Media coverage ==
In the United States, the NFL is televised on eight networks across seven media partners: ESPN/ABC/NFL Network, CBS, Fox, NBC, Prime Video, and Netflix. The league offers its media rights in packages of games to prospective media partners. The packages can vary depending on conference, broadcast time slot, or both. CBS televises afternoon games from the AFC package, and Fox carries afternoon games from the NFC package. These afternoon games are not carried on all affiliates, as multiple games are being played at once; each network affiliate is assigned one game per time slot, according to a complicated set of rules. Since 2011, the league has reserved the right to give Sunday games that, under the contract, would normally air on one network to the other network (known as "flexible scheduling"). NFL Sunday Ticket, the league's out-of-market sports package, is available through YouTube TV starting with the 2023 season. NFL Network also provides NFL RedZone, an omnibus telecast that cuts to live coverage of the most relevant plays in each game.

In addition to the regional games, the league also has packages of telecasts, mostly in prime time, that are carried nationwide. NBC broadcasts the primetime Sunday Night Football package, which includes the Thursday NFL Kickoff Game that starts the regular season and a primetime Thanksgiving Day game. ESPN is the main broadcaster of the Monday Night Football package with ABC airing select games either exclusively or as a simulcast with ESPN. Amazon, through their Prime Video streaming service, is the exclusive carrier of the Thursday Night Football package. NFL Network, a U.S. pay cable channel co-owned by both the league and ESPN, broadcasts select games under the NFL Network Exclusive Game Series banner, usually consist of NFL International Series games and select Saturday games. In 2023, the NFL occupied the top three rates for a 30-second advertisement: $882,079 for Sunday Night Football, $562,524 for Monday Night Football, and $440,523 for Thursday Night Football.

The league has expanded their televised broadcasts to over-the-top streaming services. Since 2022, Amazon has held the exclusive rights to broadcast the Thursday Night Football package. Before 2022, Amazon streamed games from the same package as part of a tri-cast model that saw games aired on broadcast television (initially through CBS and NBC, then later with Fox), cable television (through NFL Network), and digital streaming (through Prime Video). Amazon has also streamed games for free on Twitch since 2018. CBS streams its games on Paramount+ as a simulcast with its CBS broadcasts. Fox simulcasts its games on Fox One. NBC streams Sunday Night Football and select exclusive games on Peacock. ESPN streams its games on the ESPN app in simulcast with the broadcasts on ESPN or ABC. Since 2024, Netflix has held the global streaming rights for at least one Christmas Day game each season.

The Super Bowl television rights are rotated on a four-year basis between CBS, Fox, NBC, and ESPN/ABC. The NFL's most recent contract negotiation for the media rights deal was announced on March 18, 2021, taking effect from the 2023 season. The deal renewed previous rights agreements made by the NFL and each of its network partners to air their respective game packages, while awarding Amazon the Thursday Night Football package. ESPN/ABC is set to return to the Super Bowl broadcast rotation and will broadcast the Super Bowl on U.S. television in 2027, 21 years after airing its last Super Bowl, Super Bowl XL. Digital and streaming distribution was expanded to allow CBS, NBC, and ESPN/ABC to stream games on their over-the-top streaming services. For each of the packages the network partners currently hold, ESPN/ABC is paying US$2.7 billion a year; CBS, Fox, and NBC are each paying more than US$2 billion a year; and Amazon is paying US$1 billion a year. The current deal runs through the 2033 season.

The league also has deals with Spanish-language broadcasters NBC Universo, Fox Deportes, and ESPN Deportes, which each air Spanish language dubs of their English language sister networks' games. The league's contracts do not cover preseason games, which individual teams are free to sell to local stations directly; a minority of preseason games are distributed among the league's national television partners.

Through the 2014 season, the NFL had a blackout policy in which games were 'blacked out' on local television in the home team's area if the home stadium was not sold out. Clubs could elect to set this requirement at only 85%, but they would have to give more ticket revenue to the visiting team; teams could also request a specific exemption from the NFL for the game. The vast majority of NFL games were not blacked out; only 6% of games were blacked out during the 2011 season, and only two games were blacked out in 2013 and none in 2014. The NFL announced in March 2015 that it would suspend its blackout policy for at least the 2015 season. According to Nielsen, the NFL regular season since 2012 was watched by at least 200 million individuals, accounting for 80% of all television households in the United States and 69% of all potential viewers in the United States. NFL regular season games accounted for 31 out of the top 32 most-watched programs in the fall season and an NFL game ranked as the most-watched television show in all 17 weeks of the regular season. At the local level, NFL games were the highest-ranked shows in NFL markets 92% of the time. Super Bowls account for the 22 most-watched programs (based on total audience) in US history, including a record 167 million people that watched Super Bowl XLVIII, the conclusion to the 2013 season.

In addition to radio networks run by each NFL team, select NFL games are broadcast nationally by Westwood One (known as Dial Global for the 2012 season). These games are broadcast on over 500 networks, giving all NFL markets access to each primetime game. The NFL's deal with Westwood One was extended in 2012 and continued through 2017. Other NFL games are nationally distributed by Compass Media Networks and Sports USA Radio Network under contracts with individual teams.

Some broadcasting innovations have either been introduced or popularized during NFL telecasts. Among them, the Skycam camera system was used for the first time in a live telecast, at a 1984 preseason NFL game in San Diego between the Chargers and 49ers, and televised by CBS. Commentator John Madden famously used a telestrator during games between the early 1980s to the mid-2000s, boosting the device's popularity.

The NFL has licensing agreements with X, Reddit and Meta Platforms to serve as authorized social media outlets for the league and its teams. The New England Patriots' attempt to launch a Bluesky account was met with a cease and desist order from the NFL headquarters.

In 2025, the NFL began to take equity stakes in some of its media partners as part of business transactions. In August 2025, the NFL gained an equity stake in CBS parent company Paramount Skydance Corporation following the acquisition of Paramount Global by Skydance Media, by virtue of its existing investments and content partnerships with Skydance. The same month, the NFL announced that it would sell NFL Network, the NFL RedZone channel, and its fantasy football services to ESPN Inc. for an undisclosed amount, pending regulatory approval; as part of the agreement, the NFL received a 10% stake in ESPN.

== Draft ==
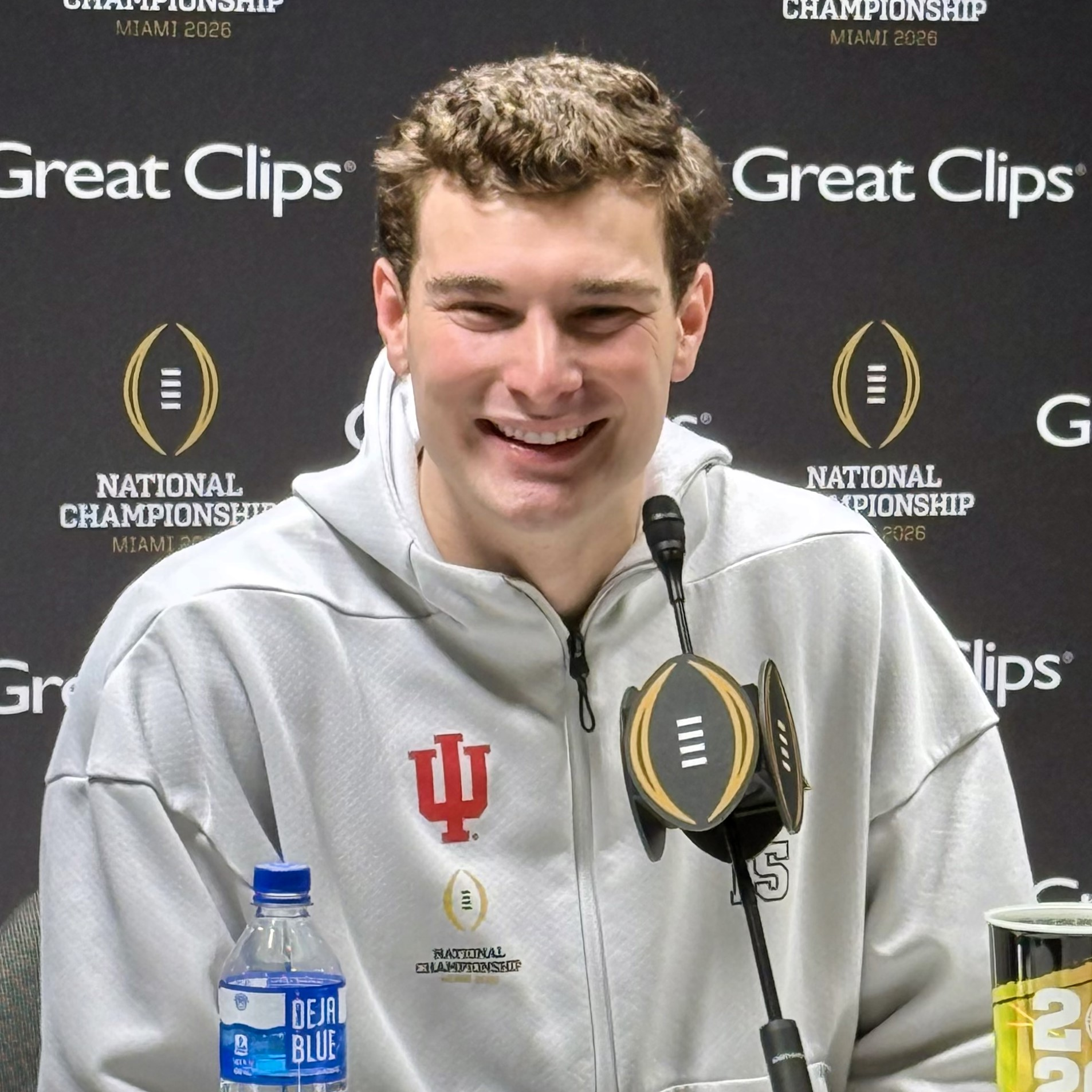
Las Vegas Raiders quarterback Fernando Mendoza, the first overall pick of the 2026 NFL draft

Each April (excluding 2014 when it took place in May), the NFL holds a draft of college players. The draft consists of seven rounds, with each of the 32 clubs getting one pick in each round. The draft order for non-playoff teams is determined by regular-season record; among playoff teams, teams are first ranked by the furthest round of the playoffs they reached, and then are ranked by regular season record. For example, any team that reached the divisional round will be given a higher pick than any team that reached the conference championships, but will be given a lower pick than any team that did not make the divisional round. The Super Bowl champion always drafts last, and the losing team from the Super Bowl always drafts next-to-last. All potential draftees must be at least three years removed from high school to be eligible for the draft. Underclassmen that have met that criterion to be eligible for the draft must write an application to the NFL by January 15 renouncing their remaining college eligibility. Clubs can trade away picks for future draft picks, but cannot trade the rights to players they have selected in previous drafts.

Aside from the seven picks each club gets, compensatory draft picks are given to teams that have lost more compensatory free agents than they have gained. These are spread out from rounds 3 to 7, and a total of 32 are given. Clubs are required to make their selection within a certain period, the exact time depending on which round the pick is made in. If they fail to do so on time, the clubs behind them can begin to select their players in order, but they do not lose the pick outright. This happened in the 2003 draft, when the Minnesota Vikings failed to make their selection on time. The Jacksonville Jaguars and Carolina Panthers were able to make their picks before the Vikings were able to use theirs. Selected players are only allowed to negotiate contracts with the team that picked them, but if they choose not to sign they become eligible for the next year's draft. Under the current collective bargaining contract, all contracts to drafted players must be four-year deals with a club option for a fifth. Contracts themselves are limited to a certain amount of money, depending on the exact draft pick the player was selected with. Players who were draft eligible but not picked in the draft are free to sign with any club.

In addition to the NFL draft, the league holds a supplemental draft annually. Clubs submit emails to the league stating the player they wish to select and the round they will do so, and the team with the highest bid wins the rights to that player. The exact order is determined by a lottery held before the draft, and a successful bid for a player will result in the team forfeiting the rights to its pick in the equivalent round of the next NFL draft. Players are only eligible for the supplemental draft after being granted a petition for special eligibility.

The league has also held expansion drafts, the most recent in 2002 when the Houston Texans began to play as an expansion team. Other drafts held by the league include an allocation draft in 1950 to allocate players from several teams that played in the dissolved All-America Football Conference and a supplemental draft in 1984 to give NFL teams the rights to players who had been eligible for the main draft but had not been drafted because they had signed contracts with the United States Football League or Canadian Football League.

Like the other major sports leagues in the United States, the NFL maintains protocol for a disaster draft. In the event of a 'near disaster' (less than 15 players killed or disabled) that caused the club to lose a quarterback, they could draft one from a team with at least three quarterbacks. In the event of a 'disaster' (15 or more players killed or disabled) that results in a club's season being canceled, a restocking draft would be held. Neither of these protocols has ever had to be implemented.

== Free agency ==
Free agents in the NFL are divided into restricted free agents, who have three accrued seasons and whose current contract has expired, and unrestricted free agents, who have four or more accrued seasons and whose contract has expired. An accrued season is defined as "six or more regular season games on a club's active/inactive, reserved/injured or reserve/physically unable to perform lists". Restricted free agents are allowed to negotiate with other clubs besides their former club, but the former club has the right to match any offer. If the club chooses not to match the offer, they are compensated with draft picks. Unrestricted free agents are free to sign with any club, and no compensation is owed if they sign with a different club.

Clubs are given one franchise tag, with which they can designate any of their unrestricted free agents. The franchise tag is a one-year deal that pays the player 120% of his previous contract or no less than the average of the five highest-paid players at his position, whichever is greater. There are two types of franchise tags: exclusive tags, which do not allow the player to negotiate with other clubs, and non-exclusive tags, which allow the player to negotiate with other clubs but gives his former club the right to match any offer and two first-round draft picks if they decline to match it.

Clubs also have the option to use a transition tag, which is similar to the non-exclusive franchise tag but offers no compensation if the former club refuses to match the offer. Due to that stipulation, the transition tag is rarely used, even with the removal of the "poison pill" strategy (offering a contract with stipulations that the former club would be unable to match) that essentially ended the usage of the tag leaguewide. Each club is subject to a salary cap, which is set at US$188.2 million for the 2019 season, US$11 million more than that of 2018.

Members of clubs' practice squads, despite being paid by and working for their clubs, are also simultaneously a kind of free agent and are able to sign to any other club's active roster (provided their new club is not their previous club's next opponent within a set number of days) without compensation to their previous club. Practice squad players cannot be signed to another club's practice squad, unless released by their original club first.

== See also ==
=== Achievements and records ===
- List of Pro Football Hall of Fame inductees
- NFL All-Decade Teams
- NFL 50th Anniversary All-Time Team
- NFL 75th Anniversary All-Time Team
- NFL 100th Anniversary All-Time Team
- The Top 100: NFL's Greatest Players
- NFL records

=== History ===
- American football in the United States
- List of NFL champions (1920–1969)
- List of Super Bowl champions (1966–present)
- NFL franchise moves and mergers
- Timeline of the National Football League

=== Other leagues ===
- National Football League (1902) – American professional football league based in Pennsylvania (1902)
- NFL Europe – Defunct professional American football league

=== Player-related ===
- International Player Pathway (IPP) – NFL program for non-American players
- List of NFL players with chronic traumatic encephalopathy (CTE)

=== Miscellaneous ===
- List of current NFL franchise owners
- NFL cheerleading
- NFL controversies
- NFL Films
