= 1920 Hammond Pros season =

Sports season

- Owner: Doc Young
- Head coach: Hank Gillo
- Home stadium: Traveling team

Results
- Record: 2–5 overall 0–3 APFA
- League place: T–11th APFA

The 1920 Hammond Pros season was the franchise's inaugural season in the American Professional Football Association (APFA) and second as an American football team. The Pros entered 1920 coming off a 4-win, 2-loss, 3-tie (4–2–3) record in 1919 as an independent team. Several representatives from another professional football league, the Ohio League, wanted to form a new national league, and thus the APFA was created.

The Pros opened the 1920 season with a 26–0 loss to the Rock Island Independents. The team did not score a point until their third game, and ended the season with a 2–5 record, which placed it tied for 11th place in the final standings. The sportswriter Bruce Copeland compiled the 1920 All-Pro list, but no players from the Pros were on it. As of 2025, no player from the 1920 Hammond Pros roster has been enshrined in the Pro Football Hall of Fame.

== Offseason ==
The Hammond Pros, who were named the Hammond All-Stars, finished 4–2–3 in their 1919 season as an independent team. The All-Stars disbanded, and three teams were created from those players: the Chicago Tigers, the Decatur Staleys, and the Pros. After the 1919 season, representatives of four Ohio League, a professional football league based in Ohio, teams—the Canton Bulldogs, the Cleveland Tigers, the Dayton Triangles, and the Akron Pros—called a meeting on August 20, 1920, to discuss the formation of a new professional league. At the meeting, they tentatively agreed on a salary cap and pledged not to sign college players or players already under contract with other teams. They also agreed on a name for the circuit: the American Professional Football Conference. They then invited other professional teams to a second meeting on September 17.

At that meeting, held at Bulldogs owner Ralph Hay's Hupmobile showroom in Canton, representatives of the Rock Island Independents, the Muncie Flyers, the Decatur Staleys, the Racine Cardinals, the Massillon Tigers, and the Hammond Pros agreed to join the league. Representatives of the Buffalo All-Americans and Rochester Jeffersons could not attend the meeting but sent letters to Hay asking to be included in the league. Team representatives changed the league's name slightly to the American Professional Football Association and elected officers, installing Jim Thorpe as president. Under the new league structure, teams created their schedules dynamically as the season progressed, so there were no minimum or maximum number of games needed to be played. Also, representatives of each team voted to determine the winner of the APFA trophy.

== Schedule ==
The Pros, who did not have a scheduled home game, were a traveling team.

Game	Date	Opponent	Result	Record	Venue	Attendance	Recap	Sources
1	October 10	at Rock Island Independents	L 0–26	0–1	Douglas Park	2,554	Recap	
2	October 17	at Dayton Triangles	L 0–44	0–2	Triangle Park	2,000	Recap	
—	Bye							
3	October 31	at Logan Squares	W 14–9	1–2	Logan Square Park	3,000	Recap	
4	November 7	at Pullman Original Thorns	W 14–13	2–2	Pullman, Illinois	"a good crowd"	Recap	
5	November 14	at Gary Elks	L 6–7	2–3	Gleason Field	2,000	Recap	
6	November 21	at Decatur Staleys	L 7–28	2–4	Staley Field	3,000	Recap	
7	November 25	at Chicago Boosters	L 0–27	2–5	DePaul Field		Recap	
Note: Non-APFA teams in italics. Thanksgiving Day: November 25.

== Standings ==
1920 APFA standings
	W	L	T	PCT	DIV	DPCT	PF	PA	STK
Akron Pros†	8	0	3	1.000	6–0–3	1.000	151	7	T2
Decatur Staleys	10	1	2	.909	5–1–2	.833	164	21	T1
Buffalo All-Americans	9	1	1	.900	4–1–1	.800	258	32	T1
Chicago Cardinals	6	2	2	.750	3–2–1	.600	101	29	T1
Rock Island Independents	6	2	2	.750	4–2–1	.667	201	49	W1
Dayton Triangles	5	2	2	.714	4–2–2	.667	150	54	L1
Rochester Jeffersons	6	3	2	.667	0–1–0	.000	156	57	T1
Canton Bulldogs	7	4	2	.636	4–3–1	.571	208	57	W1
Detroit Heralds	2	3	3	.400	1–3–0	.250	53	82	T2
Cleveland Tigers	2	4	2	.333	1–4–2	.200	28	46	L1
Chicago Tigers	2	5	1	.286	1–5–1	.167	49	63	W1
Hammond Pros	2	5	0	.286	0–3–0	.000	41	154	L3
Columbus Panhandles	2	6	2	.250	0–5–0	.000	41	121	W1
Muncie Flyers	0	1	0	.000	0–1–0	.000	0	45	L1

† Awarded the Brunswick-Balke Collender Cup and named APFA Champions
by vote of league owners. Staleys claimed a co-title.

== Game summaries ==
=== Game 1: at Rock Island Independents ===
	1	2	3	4	Total
Pros	0	0	0	0	0
Independents	0	13	0	13	26

October 10, 1920, at Douglas Park

The Pros started their season with a game against the Rock Island Independents. The Independents already played two games and were undefeated. There were no scores by either team in the first or third quarters, but the Independents scored 13 points in the second and fourth. Running backs Fred Chicken, Ray Kuehl, and Gerald Mansfield accounting for four touchdowns throughout the game. Quarterback Pudge Wyman throw two touchdowns—a 35-yard one to Kuehl and a 20-yard one to Mansfield. Hammond started to purposely injure their opponents during the game because they realized the Independents were a much greater team. As a result, Rube Ursella suffered a twisted knee. Duey Lyle was kicked in the face and required seven stitches. Lastly, Ed Healey was kicked in the face needed five stitches in the cheek.

=== Game 2: at Dayton Triangles ===
	1	2	3	4	Total
Pros	0	0	0	0	0
Triangles	7	20	3	14	44

October 17, 1920, at Triangle Park

The Dayton Triangles were the Pros' next opponent. For a second week in a row, the Pros did not score a point. In the first quarter, Triangle back Al Mahrt had a one-yard rushing touchdown. The Triangles scored three touchdowns in the second quarter: a 50-yard receiving touchdown from Mahrt, a 35-yard receiving touchdown from end Dave Reese, and a rushing touchdown from back Lou Partlow. The extra point was missed after the first touchdown. In the next quarter, back George Roudebush kicked a 35-yard field goal. The last score of the game was a receiving touchdown from back Norb Sacksteder. The final score of the game was 44–0 before a crowd of 2,000.

=== Game 3: at Logan Squares ===
	1	2	3	4	Total
Pros	?	?	?	?	14
Squares	?	?	?	?	9

October 31, 1920, at Logan Square Park

After two losses, the Pros decided to not schedule a game in week five and challenge a non-APFA team in week six. Their next opponent, the Logan Squares from Chicago, were on a two-game winning streak. The scoring summary is unavailable, but the Pros defeated the Squares 14–9 in front of 3,000 attendees.

=== Game 4: at Pullman Thorns ===
	1	2	3	4	Total
Pros	?	?	?	?	14
Thorns	?	?	?	?	13

November 7, 1920, in Chicago, Illinois The Pros next challenged the Pullman Thorns, a non-APFA team. The Thorns were undefeated going into this game with a record of 3–0. The scoring summary is unknown. For the Pros, Hank Gillo and Mace Roberts both scored rushing touchdowns; for the Thorns, LaForest had two rushing touchdowns. The Pros converted two extra points, while the Thorns only converted one. The final score of the game was a 14–13 victory for the Pros.

=== Game 5: at Gary Elks ===
	1	2	3	4	Total
Pros	6	0	0	0	6
Elks	0	0	0	7	7

November 14, 1920, at Gleason Field

After a two-game winning streak, the Pros played the Gary Elks, a non-APFA team, at Gleason Field, with 2,000 people in attendance. The Elks game into the game with an undefeated 5–0–1 record. The Pros were the first team to score when Gilo had a 20-yard rushing touchdown in the first quarter; the extra point was missed, however. The score would stay 6–0 until Smeltzer of the Elks caught a pass from Leverette in the fourth quarter. The extra point was made, and the final score of the game was a 7–6 loss for the Pros.

=== Game 6: at Decatur Staleys ===
	1	2	3	4	Total
Pros	0	0	7	0	7
Staleys	7	14	0	7	28

November 21, 1920, at Staley Field

On November 21, the Pros battled the Decatur Staleys in front of 3,000 fans. In the first quarter, Staley back Ralph Lanum scored a 23-yard rushing touchdown. This touchdown was Lanum's only score of the entire 1920 season. Ed Sternaman of the Staleys scored a 10-yard rushing touchdown in the second quarter. Also, George Halas caught a 15-yard receiving touchdown from Jimmy Conzelman to have the game 21–0 going into halftime. In the third quarter, the Staleys did not score, but the Pros put points on the board. Wally Hess caught a 15-yard pass from Emmett Specht for a touchdown. In the final quarter, Halas scored a 26-yard receiving touchdown, and the game ended 28–7.

=== Game 7: at Chicago Boosters ===
	1	2	3	4	Total
Pros	0	0	0	0	0
Boosters	?	?	?	?	27

November 25, 1920, at DePaul Field

In their final game of the 1920 season, the Pros played the Chicago Boosters, a non-APFA team. The Boosters came into the game with an undefeated record of 3–0–4. The scoring summary is unknown, but four players of the Boosters—Annan, Bond, Reilly, Applehans—scored a touchdown. The final score of the game was a 27–0 loss for the Pros.

== Postseason ==
With a losing record, the Pros could not contend for the APFA Championship. After the season was over, the team hired Max Hicks to be the coach for the following season. The Pros' 1920 record of 2–5–2 would be their best outing until 1924; the team folded two years later. Sportswriter Bruce Copeland compiled the 1920 All Pro team, but no player made the list. As of 2012, no players from the 1920 Hammond Pros were enshrined in the Pro Football Hall of Fame.

== Roster ==
- Mose Bashaw (Tackle)
- Tony Catalano
- Cole (End)
- Edward Davis (Guard)
- Guil Falcon
- Hank Gillo (Fullback)
- Wilbur Henderson
- Wally Hess
- Max Hicks
- Carol Johnson (Tackle)
- George H. "Dutch" Kohl (Center)
- Klinks Meyers (End)
- Matthews (Halfback)
- Oldts (Guard)
- Pulaski (Halfback)
- Mace Roberts (Halfback)
- Emmett Specht (Halfback)
- Ward (Quarterback)
- Warren (Quarterback)
