= 1920 Buffalo All-Americans season =

1920 American football season for Buffalo

- Owner: Frank McNeil
- Head coach: Tommy Hughitt
- Home stadium: Canisius Villa (7); Buffalo Baseball Park (3)

Results
- Record: 9–1–1 Overall; 4–1–1 APFA
- Division place: 3rd APFA
- Playoffs: No playoffs in the APFA

The 1920 Buffalo All-Americans season was the franchise's inaugural season with the American Professional Football Association (APFA), an American football league, and fifth total as a team. The All-Americans entered 1920 coming off a 9–1–1 record in 1919 as the Buffalo Prospects in the New York Pro Football League (NYPFL). Several representatives from another professional football league, the Ohio League, wanted to form a new national league, and thus the APFA was created.

Buffalo reshaped itself for the 1920 season. Only two players from the 1919 season stayed, and the team went into new management. Tommy Hughitt (one of the returning players) became the new coach, and Frank McNeil became the new owner. The All-Americans opened the season with a 32–6 victory over the local semi-pro team West Buffalo, en route to a 9-win, 1–loss, 1-tie (9–1–1) record. Its only loss of the season was a 3–0 game against the Canton Bulldogs. A meeting was held by the officials of the APFA to determine a winner, with each coach having a vote. The All-Americans stated their cases; they believed they should deserve the championship trophy because they had the most wins and were undefeated against the Akron Pros and the Decatur Staleys. The officials, however, awarded the Brunswick-Balke Collender Cup to the Akron Pros because they had a 1.000 winning percentage. Had standings been counted as they are as of today, the All-Americans would be co-champions.

The sportswriter Bruce Copeland compiled the 1920 All-Pro list, but no players from the All-Americans were on it. That is because Copeland wrote for the Rock Island Argus and did not see any players from the easternmost teams in the league. As of 2024, no player from the 1920 All-Americans has been enshrined in the Pro Football Hall of Fame.

== Offseason ==
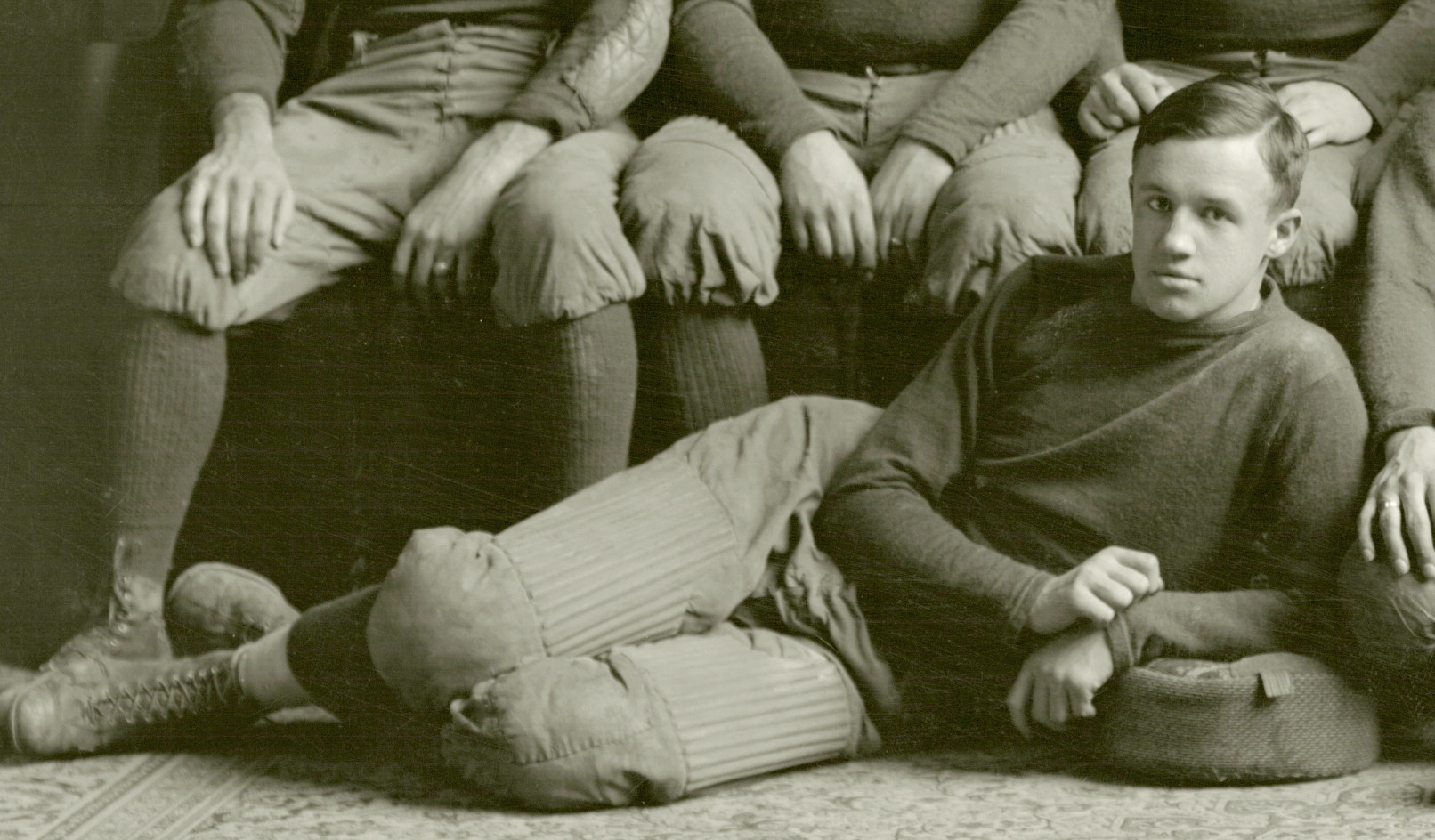
Buffalo player-coach, Tommy Hughitt

In the 1919 season, the franchise was named the Buffalo Prospects, and finished with a 9–1–1 in the NYPFL. As a result, they won the New York Championship. After the 1919 season, the Prospects went under new management, and the name was changed to the All-Americans. Tommy Hughitt became the coach, and several players from the 1919 squad left. Of the 33 players on the 1919 team, only Barney Lepper and Tommy Hughitt remained on the team for the 1920 season.

After the 1919 season, representatives of four Ohio League teams—the Canton Bulldogs, the Cleveland Tigers, the Dayton Triangles, and the Akron Pros—called a meeting on August 20, 1920, to discuss the formation of a new league. At the meeting, they tentatively agreed on a salary cap and pledged not to sign college players or players already under contract with other teams. They also agreed on a name for the circuit: the American Professional Football Conference.

They then invited other professional teams to a second meeting on September 17, held at Bulldogs owner Ralph Hay's Hupmobile showroom in Canton. Representatives of the Rock Island Independents, the Muncie Flyers, the Decatur Staleys, the Racine Cardinals, the Massillon Tigers, the Chicago Cardinals, and the Hammond Pros agreed to join the league. Representatives of the All-Americans and Rochester Jeffersons could not attend the meeting, but sent letters to Hay asking to be included in the league. Team representatives changed the league's name slightly to the American Professional Football Association and elected officers, installing Jim Thorpe as president. Under the new league structure, teams created their schedules dynamically as the season progressed, so there were no minimum or maximum number of games needed to be played. Also, representatives of each team voted to determine the winner of the APFA trophy.

== Schedule ==
| Game | Date | Opponent | Result | Record | Venue | Attendance | Recap | Sources |
|---|---|---|---|---|---|---|---|---|
| 1 | October 3 | West Buffalo | W 32–6 | 1–0 | Canisius Villa | "fair-size crowd" | Recap | |
| 2 | October 10 | All-Buffalo | W 51–0 | 2–0 | Canisius Villa | "a large crowd" | Recap | |
| 3 | October 17 | McKeesport Olympics | W 28–7 | 3–0 | Canisius Villa | "a large crowd" | Recap | |
| 4 | October 24 | Toledo Maroons | W 38–0 | 4–0 | Canisius Villa | 6,000 | Recap | |
| 5 | October 31 | Rochester Jeffersons | W 17–6 | 5–0 | Canisius Villa | 7,500 | Recap | |
| 6 | November 7 | All-Tonawanda Lumberjacks | W 35–0 | 6–0 | Canisius Villa | 7,000 | Recap | |
| 7 | November 14 | Columbus Panhandles | W 43–7 | 7–0 | Canisius Villa | 9,000 | Recap | |
| 8 | November 21 | Canton Bulldogs | L 0–3 | 7–1 | Buffalo Baseball Park | 9,000 | Recap | |
| 9 | November 28 | vs. Cleveland Tigers | W 7–0 | 8–1 | Buffalo Baseball Park | 5,000 | Recap | |
| 10 | December 4 | Canton Bulldogs | W 7–3 | 9–1 | Polo Grounds | 10,000 | Recap | |
| 11 | December 5 | Akron Pros | T 0–0 | 9–1–1 | Buffalo Baseball Park | 3,000 | Recap | |
Note: Non-APFA teams in italics.

== Standings ==
Newspaper ad for the Halloween game against the Rochester Jeffersons. A ticket price of $1.10 implies a gate of $8,250 if the entire crowd estimated at 7,500 were paid.

1920 APFA standings
| | W | L | T | PCT | DIV | DPCT | PF | PA | STK |
|---|---|---|---|---|---|---|---|---|---|
| Akron Pros† | 8 | 0 | 3 | 1.000 | 6–0–3 | 1.000 | 151 | 7 | T2 |
| Decatur Staleys | 10 | 1 | 2 | .909 | 5–1–2 | .833 | 164 | 21 | T1 |
| Buffalo All-Americans | 9 | 1 | 1 | .900 | 4–1–1 | .800 | 258 | 32 | T1 |
| Chicago Cardinals | 6 | 2 | 2 | .750 | 3–2–1 | .600 | 101 | 29 | T1 |
| Rock Island Independents | 6 | 2 | 2 | .750 | 4–2–1 | .667 | 201 | 49 | W1 |
| Dayton Triangles | 5 | 2 | 2 | .714 | 4–2–2 | .667 | 150 | 54 | L1 |
| Rochester Jeffersons | 6 | 3 | 2 | .667 | 0–1–0 | .000 | 156 | 57 | T1 |
| Canton Bulldogs | 7 | 4 | 2 | .636 | 4–3–1 | .571 | 208 | 57 | W1 |
| Detroit Heralds | 2 | 3 | 3 | .400 | 1–3–0 | .250 | 53 | 82 | T2 |
| Cleveland Tigers | 2 | 4 | 2 | .333 | 1–4–2 | .200 | 28 | 46 | L1 |
| Chicago Tigers | 2 | 5 | 1 | .286 | 1–5–1 | .167 | 49 | 63 | W1 |
| Hammond Pros | 2 | 5 | 0 | .286 | 0–3–0 | .000 | 41 | 154 | L3 |
| Columbus Panhandles | 2 | 6 | 2 | .250 | 0–5–0 | .000 | 41 | 121 | W1 |
| Muncie Flyers | 0 | 1 | 0 | .000 | 0–1–0 | .000 | 0 | 45 | L1 |

† Awarded the Brunswick-Balke Collender Cup and named APFA Champions
by vote of league owners. Staleys claimed a co-title.

== Game summaries ==
=== Game 1: vs. West Buffalo ===
| | 1 | 2 | 3 | 4 | Total |
|---|---|---|---|---|---|
| West Buffalo | 0 | 0 | 6 | 0 | 6 |
| All-Americans | 6 | 13 | 6 | 7 | 32 |

October 3, 1920, at Canisius Field

To open the season, the All-Americans defeated the local, semi-pro team West Buffalo. Running back Bodie Weldon scored a rushing touchdown in the first quarter. Quarterback Tommy Hughitt and Weldon added touchdowns in the second quarter to make the score 19–0 going into halftime. Hughitt scored from a yard out in the third quarter to make the score 25–0. West Buffalo got on the scoreboard when Bob Langdon intercepted a Buffalo pass and ran it back 60 yards for a touchdown. This was West Buffalo's only points scored their entire year. Buffalo finished off the scoring in the fourth quarter on a 10-yard Swede Youngstrom reception and won the game 32–6.

=== Game 2: vs. All-Buffalo ===
| | 1 | 2 | 3 | 4 | Total |
|---|---|---|---|---|---|
| All-Buffalo | 0 | 0 | 0 | 0 | 0 |
| All-Americans | 7 | 20 | 7 | 17 | 51 |

October 10, 1920, at Canisius Field

For their second game of the season, the All-Americans played against another local team, the Buffalo All-Buffalo. Once again, the All-Americans shut out their opponents, winning 51–0. In the first quarter, Weldon scored a rushing touchdown. In the second quarter, the All-Americans scored three times: Running back Ockie Anderson returned a punt for a touchdown, Hughitt ran for a rushing touchdown, and Weldon caught a receiving touchdown from Hughitt. To start the second half, Anderson scored another rushing touchdown, and that was the only score of the third quarter. In the final quarter, Anderson kicked a 35-yard field goal. Also, defensive end Murray Shelton recovered a fumble and returned it for a touchdown. Hughitt's rushing touchdown was the final score of the game.

=== Game 3: vs. McKeesport Olympics ===
| | 1 | 2 | 3 | 4 | Total |
|---|---|---|---|---|---|
| Olympics | 0 | 0 | 7 | 0 | 7 |
| All-Americans | 7 | 7 | 0 | 14 | 28 |

October 17, 1920, at Canisius Field

The McKeesport Olympics, a team from McKeesport, Pennsylvania, was the All-Americans next opponent. This game had to be played outside of Pennsylvania because of that state's blue laws which disallowed football on Sundays. In fact, this was one of only two away games for the Olympics. Hughitt scored a rushing touchdown in the first quarter to start the game. In the second quarter, Hughitt threw a touchdown pass to offensive lineman Heinie Miller to bring the All-Americans' lead to 14–0 going into halftime. The Olympics scored their only points of the game in the third quarter. A player with the last name of Schreiner caught a receiving touchdown. The All-Americans answered when offensive lineman Lou Little blocked a field goal and ran it back for a touchdown. The final score of the game came when Shelton caught a receiving touchdown in the fourth quarter from Hughitt.

=== Game 4: vs. Toledo Maroons ===
| | 1 | 2 | 3 | 4 | Total |
|---|---|---|---|---|---|
| Maroons | 0 | 0 | 0 | 0 | 0 |
| All-Americans | 14 | 10 | 7 | 7 | 38 |

October 24, 1920, at Canisius Field

For the All-Americans' next game, they played against the Toledo Maroons. Based in Toledo, Ohio, the Maroons were an independent team but became part of the APFA in 1922. Coming into the game, the Maroons had not scored a point for the entire season, and that streak continued this game. Six thousand people were in attendance for the 38–0 All-Americans victory. In the first quarter, Anderson returned a 40-yard and a 50-yard punt for two touchdowns. Hughitt scored a rushing touchdown in the second quarter, and Weldon kicked a 35-yard field goal to make the score 24–0 at halftime. Anderson scored the final two touchdowns of the game. He scored two rushing touchdowns: one in the third quarter and one in the fourth quarter.

=== Game 5: vs. Rochester Jeffersons ===
| | 1 | 2 | 3 | 4 | Total |
|---|---|---|---|---|---|
| Jeffersons | 0 | 3 | 0 | 3 | 6 |
| All-Americans | 10 | 7 | 0 | 0 | 17 |

October 31, 1920, at Canisius Field

In week six, the All-Americans played their first game against an APFA team, challenging the Rochester Jeffersons. The All-Americans received the kickoff, and on its opening drive kicked a 30-yard field goal. The Jeffersons' first drive resulted a turnover on downs. Weldon scored a 3-yard rushing touchdown on the resulting All-Americans' drive. Rochester running back Jim Laird scored all of his team's points. In the second and the fourth quarter, he kicked a 30-yard and a 33-yard field goal, respectively. The All-Americans' final score of the game came from a blocked punt, with defensive guard Bill Brace recovering it in the end zone.

=== Game 6: vs. All-Tonawanda Lumberjacks ===
| | 1 | 2 | 3 | 4 | Total |
|---|---|---|---|---|---|
| Lumberjacks | 0 | 0 | 0 | 0 | 0 |
| All-Americans | 7 | 21 | 7 | 0 | 35 |

November 7, 1920, at Canisius Field

The All-Americans next game was against the All-Tonawanda Lumberjacks, who would join the APFA the following year. Anderson scored a rushing touchdown to put the All-Americans up 7–0 at the end of the first quarter. The All-Americans followed up with three touchdowns in the next quarter. Anderson rushed for two, and running back Barney Lepper rushed for another one. Hughitt scored the All-Americans' last touchdown of the game in the third quarter when he rushed for a touchdown. The final score of the game was 35–0. This game was the Lumberjacks only loss of the season, and the only game in which they failed to score a point.

=== Game 7: vs. Columbus Panhandles ===
| | 1 | 2 | 3 | 4 | Total |
|---|---|---|---|---|---|
| Panhandles | 7 | 0 | 0 | 0 | 7 |
| All-Americans | 6 | 23 | 7 | 7 | 43 |

November 14, 1920, at Canisius Field

With 9,000 fans in attendance, the All-Americans played an APFA opponent, the Columbus Panhandles. At the end of the first quarter, the Panhandles were winning 7–6. After that, the game "proved disastrous", according to football historian Chris Willis, to the Panhandles. The final score was 43–7. The Panhandles' only score was a receiving touchdown from Homer Ruh. The All-Americans had six rushing touchdowns, four of which came from Smith. The other two came from Anderson and Hughitt. From these six rushing touchdowns, five of the extra points were converted, and the All-Americans' defense got a safety.

=== Game 8: vs. Canton Bulldogs ===
| | 1 | 2 | 3 | 4 | Total |
|---|---|---|---|---|---|
| Bulldogs | 0 | 0 | 0 | 3 | 3 |
| All-Americans | 0 | 0 | 0 | 0 | 0 |

November 21, 1920, at Buffalo Baseball Park

In their eighth contest of the season, the All-Americans played the Bulldogs. Jim Thorpe, who was later inducted into the Pro Football Hall of Fame, started the game for the Bulldogs, but he came out at halftime because he believed it would end in a tie. Both teams were slowed by a muddy field, and the football became soggy after three quarters. Neither the All-Americans nor the Bulldogs could gain a lot of yards during the game. The lone score of the game came with under four minutes to play: a field goal from the Bulldogs' Al Feeney. He never missed a field goal the entire 1920 season, and the final score of the game was 3–0.

=== Game 9: vs. Cleveland Tigers ===
| | 1 | 2 | 3 | 4 | Total |
|---|---|---|---|---|---|
| Tigers | 0 | 0 | 0 | 0 | 0 |
| All-Americans | 0 | 0 | 7 | 0 | 7 |

November 28, 1920, at Buffalo Baseball Park

Following their first loss of the season, the All-Americans challenged the Cleveland Tigers. The owner of the Tigers, Jimmy O'Donnell, helped with the foundation of the APFA. A total of 5,000 fans showed up to the game. The only score of the game came in the third quarter. Anderson scored an 8-yard rushing touchdown. This loss for the Tigers would be their final game of the season.

=== Game 10: vs. Canton Bulldogs ===
| | 1 | 2 | 3 | 4 | Total |
|---|---|---|---|---|---|
| Bulldogs | 0 | 0 | 3 | 0 | 3 |
| All-Americans | 0 | 0 | 0 | 7 | 7 |

December 4, 1920, at Polo Grounds

The following week, the All-Americans played their second game against the Bulldogs, winning 7–3. The Bulldogs did not get a first down or complete a pass during the game, but Thorpe kicked a field goal in the third quarter after a fumble recovery for the team's only score. In the fourth quarter, All-Americans tackle Youngstrom blocked a Thorpe punt and returned it for a touchdown. The Sunday Chronicle named Thorpe, Henry and Lowe as the Bulldogs' stars, while Anderson, Youngstrom, and Miller were the standouts for the All-Americans.

=== Game 11: vs. Akron Pros ===
| | 1 | 2 | 3 | 4 | Total |
|---|---|---|---|---|---|
| Pros | 0 | 0 | 0 | 0 | 0 |
| All-Americans | 0 | 0 | 0 | 0 | 0 |

December 5, 1920, at Buffalo Baseball Park

The All-Americans had the Akron Pros as their next opponent. The All-Americans were tired from their victory against the Canton Bulldogs the day before. Before the start of the game, Bob Nash of Akron was sold to the All-Americans for $300 and 5% of the Akron-Buffalo gate, making the first deal in APFA history. The reason for the trade was because rain was responsible for a low turnout of fans, and the game would not have been profitable for the Pros. However, Nash did not appear in the game for either team, and Scotty Bierce replaced Nash for the Pros. The rain caused sloppy game play as well as a small crowd of 3,000 people. The All-Americans had an opportunity to score in the final minutes of the game. Fritz Pollard fumbled the ball, and Heinie Miller recovered it. Buffalo had the ball on the 12-yard-line, but the officials called the end of the game. It resulted in a 0–0 tie.

== Post-season ==
Since there were no playoff system in the APFA until 1932, a meeting was held to determine the 1920 APFA Champions. Each team that showed up had a vote to determine the champions. The All-Americans stated that they should win the award because they had more wins and were not beaten by the Akron Pros. Since the Akron Pros had a 1.000 winning percentage, however, the Pros were awarded the Brunswick-Balke Collender Cup on April 30, 1921. Ties were not counted in standings until 1972, which is why Akron is credited with a 1.000 winning percentage. The sportswriter Bruce Copeland compiled the All-Pro list for the 1920 season. No player from the All-Americans were on the list.

== Roster ==
Buffalo All-Americans 1920 roster
| Ockie Anderson TB, DB; John Beckett LOT, DT; Bill Brace LOG, DG; Shirley Brick LOE, DE; Andy Fletcher HB, FB; Buck Gavin FB, LB; Tommy Hughitt BB, DB; Jim Laird WB, DB; Barney Lepper TB, DB | Lou Little ROT, DT; Heinie Miller ROE, DE; Earl Potteiger WB, DB; Johnny Scott TB, DB; Murray Shelton LOE, DE; Cedric Smith FB, LB; Joe Spagna LOT, DT; Claude Thornhill LOT, DT; John Weldon WB, DB | Lud Wray C, MG; Swede Youngstrom ROG, DG |
