= 1920 Rochester Jeffersons season =

National Football League team season

- Owner: Leo Lyons
- Head coach: Jack Forsyth
- Home stadium: Baseball Park

Results
- Record: 6–3–2 overall 0–1 APFA
- League place: 6th in APFA

The 1920 Rochester Jeffersons season was the franchise's inaugural season in the American Professional Football Association (APFA) and thirteenth as an American football team. The Jeffersons entered 1920 coming off a six-win, two-loss, two-tie (6–2–2) record in the New York Pro Football League (NYPFL) where it lost the championship game to the Buffalo Prospects. Several representatives from another professional football league, the Ohio League, wanted to form a new national league, and thus the APFA was created.

Ownership, roster, and coaching nearly stayed the same for the 1920 season. The team opened the season with a 10–0 victory over the non-APFA All-Buffalo. The only time the Jeffersons played a game against an APFA team was week six, when they lost to the Buffalo All-Americans. The team ended with a 6–3–2 record, which was good enough for them to finish sixth place in the final standings. The sportswriter Bruce Copeland compiled the 1920 All-Pro list, but no players from the Jeffersonss were on it. As of 2012, no player from the 1920 Rochester Jeffersons has been enshrined in the Pro Football Hall of Fame.

The Jeffersons' 66–0 defeat of Fort Porter remains the largest regular season shutout victory in league history, albeit being against a non-league team.

== Offseason ==
The Rochester Jeffersons finished 6–2–1 in their 1919 season. It lost the NYPFL championship to the Buffalo All-Americans. After the 1919 season, representatives of four Ohio League teams—the Canton Bulldogs, the Cleveland Tigers, the Dayton Triangles, and the Akron Pros—called a meeting on August 20, 1920, to discuss the formation of a new league. At the meeting, they tentatively agreed on a salary cap and pledged not to sign college players or players already under contract with other teams. They also agreed on a name for the circuit: the American Professional Football Conference. They then invited other professional teams to a second meeting on September 17.

At that meeting, held at Bulldogs owner Ralph Hay's Hupmobile showroom in Canton, representatives of the Rock Island Independents, the Muncie Flyers, the Decatur Staleys, the Racine Cardinals, the Massillon Tigers, the Chicago Cardinals, and the Hammond Pros agreed to join the league. Representatives of the All-Americans and Rochester Jeffersons could not attend the meeting, but sent letters to Hay asking to be included in the league. Team representatives changed the league's name slightly to the American Professional Football Association and elected officers, installing Jim Thorpe as president. Under the new league structure, teams created their schedules dynamically as the season progressed, so there were no minimum or maximum number of games needed to be played. Also, representatives of each team voted to determine the winner of the APFA trophy.

== Regular season ==
Scheduling for the Jeffersons was extremely ad hoc. Little over two weeks before the start of the 1920 season, team manager Leo V. Lyons was still putting out feelers for a "good heavyweight opponent" for the home opener. Gene Dooley and his "All-Buffalo" squad met the call but were not heavy enough to go toe-to-toe, falling 10–0 to the Jeffs on a rainy Sunday afternoon in Rochester's Baseball Park.

The Rochester Jeffersons were essentially a regional team, playing local opponents, with 10 of their 11 games in Rochester. The Red Eleven's solitary road game was played in Buffalo — a little over 70 miles away. The Jeffs played opponents solely from upstate New York, including grid squads from Rochester, Buffalo, Syracuse, Tonawanda, and Utica — the last-mentioned being the furthest distance away from Rochester, about 135 miles.

Following the Jeffs' second game of the season, a frolicking 66–0 smash up of a lesser opponent, four Rochester fans approached head coach Jack Forsyth and asked permission to organize a Jeffs rooters' club. Forsyth approved the plan, leaving the details to be worked out by the interested fans themselves, while agreeing to serve as treasurer.

== Schedule ==
Game	Date	Opponent	Result	Record	Venue	Attendance	Recap	Sources
1	October 3	All-Buffalo	W 10–0	1–0	Rochester Baseball Park	2,000	Recap	
2	October 10	Fort Porter	W 66–0	2–0	Rochester Baseball Park		Recap	
3	October 17	Utica Knights of Columbus	T 0–0	2–0–1	Rochester Baseball Park		Recap	
4	October 24	Syracuse Stars	W 21–7	3–0–1	Rochester Baseball Park		Recap	
5	October 31	at Buffalo All-Americans	L 6–17	3–1–1	Canisius Villa	7,500	Recap	
6	November 7	Utica Knights of Columbus	W 27–7	4–1–1	Rochester Baseball Park		Recap	
7	November 14	All-Tonawanda Lumberjacks	L 0–6	4–2–1	Rochester Baseball Park	"largest since opening day"	Recap	
8	November 21	Rochester Scalpers	W 16–0	5–2–1	Rochester Baseball Park	"largest of season"	Recap	
9	November 25	All-Tonawanda Lumberjacks	L 3–14	5–3–1	Rochester Baseball Park	2,500	Recap	
10	November 28	Rochester Scalpers	W 7–6	6–3–1	Rochester Baseball Park	"good-sized crowd"	Recap	
11	December 5	at Rochester Scalpers	T 0–0	6–3–2	Edgerton Park Arena		Recap	
Note: Non-APFA opponents in italics. Thanksgiving Day: November 25.

== Standings ==
The Jeffs played only one road game, traveling 75 miles to play the Buffalo All-Americans ("Professionals") on the field of Canisius University. About 7,500 fans turned out, generating far and away the biggest gate of the year.

1920 APFA standings
	W	L	T	PCT	DIV	DPCT	PF	PA	STK
Akron Pros†	8	0	3	1.000	6–0–3	1.000	151	7	T2
Decatur Staleys	10	1	2	.909	5–1–2	.833	164	21	T1
Buffalo All-Americans	9	1	1	.900	4–1–1	.800	258	32	T1
Chicago Cardinals	6	2	2	.750	3–2–1	.600	101	29	T1
Rock Island Independents	6	2	2	.750	4–2–1	.667	201	49	W1
Dayton Triangles	5	2	2	.714	4–2–2	.667	150	54	L1
Rochester Jeffersons	6	3	2	.667	0–1–0	.000	156	57	T1
Canton Bulldogs	7	4	2	.636	4–3–1	.571	208	57	W1
Detroit Heralds	2	3	3	.400	1–3–0	.250	53	82	T2
Cleveland Tigers	2	4	2	.333	1–4–2	.200	28	46	L1
Chicago Tigers	2	5	1	.286	1–5–1	.167	49	63	W1
Hammond Pros	2	5	0	.286	0–3–0	.000	41	154	L3
Columbus Panhandles	2	6	2	.250	0–5–0	.000	41	121	W1
Muncie Flyers	0	1	0	.000	0–1–0	.000	0	45	L1

† Awarded the Brunswick-Balke Collender Cup and named APFA Champions
by vote of league owners. Staleys claimed a co-title.
