= 1919 Buffalo Prospects season =

American football team season

- Owner: Dr. Walter Savage
- General manager: Barney Lepper
- Head coach: Wesley Albott

Results
- Record: 9–1–1
- Division place: 1st NYPFL
- Playoffs: W NYPFL Championship vs. Rochester Jeffersons (20–0)

The 1919 Buffalo Prospects season played in the New York Pro Football League and would go on to post a 9–1–1 record. The next year, the team would move into the American Professional Football Association (later renamed the National Football League).

The war and flu restrictions that had hampered the 1918 pro football season were no longer in place, and statewide play reopened after a one-year hiatus. Tommy Hughitt, who led the Buffalo Niagaras to a dominating championship among four semi-pro teams in Buffalo in 1918, initially left for Ohio in an attempt to revive the Youngstown Patricians; after one week, the Patricians folded, and by week 2, Hughitt was back in Buffalo, where he would spend the rest of his life. Hughitt signed with the Prospects, eventually leading them to the state championship.

== Schedule ==
Game	Date	Opponent	Result
1	September 28, 1919	West Buffalo	L 7–0
2	October 5, 1919	Niagaras	W 23–2
3	October 12, 1919	Tonawanda Grive-Eldridge	W 40–0
4	October 26, 1919	Rochester Scalpers	Cancelled
5	October 26, 1919	West Buffalo	W 19–0
6	November 2, 1919	LeRoy	W 74–0
7	November 9, 1919	All-Syracuse	W 23–0
8	November 16, 1919	Watertown Red & Black	Cancelled
9	November 16, 1919	Cleveland Panthers	W 25–0
10	November 23, 1919	All-Tonawanda Lumberjacks	W 12–7
11	November 27, 1919	Rochester Jeffersons	T 0–0
12	November 30, 1919	Rochester Jeffersons (replay)	W 20–0
