= Henry McDonald (American football) =

American football player (1890–1976)

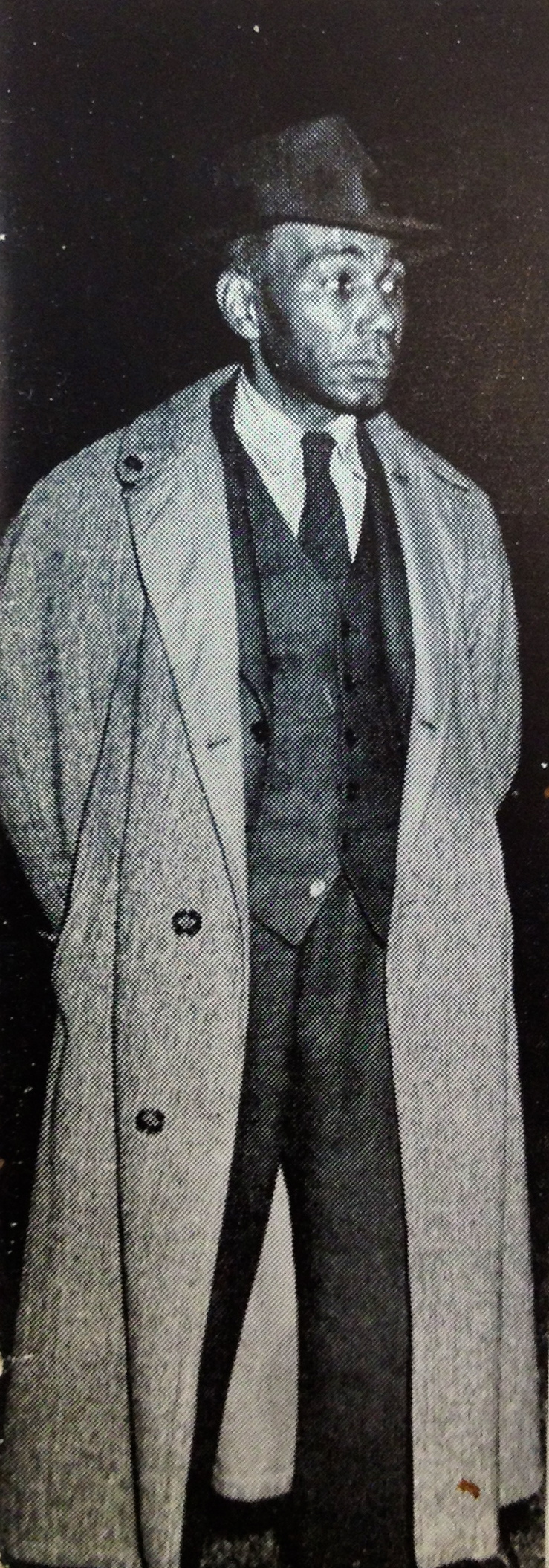

Profile
- Position: Halfback

Personal information
- Born: August 31, 1890; Port-au-Prince, Haiti
- Died: June 12, 1976 (aged 85)

Career information
- College: Canandaigua Academy

Career history
- 1911: Oxford Pros
- 1911–1917: Rochester Jeffersons
- 1917: All-Syracuse

Henry 'Hank' C. McDonald (August 31, 1890 – June 12, 1976) was a professional American football player for the Rochester Jeffersons from 1911 until 1917. He was one of the best known, and possibly the first, black American pro players during the era prior to the formation of the National Football League in 1920.

== Early life ==
Henry McDonald was born in Port-au-Prince, Haiti, however his biological parents agreed to allow him to be adopted by his father's employer, an American coconut and banana importer. McDonald later recalled that his natural parents realized how great an opportunity it was for him to grow up in the United States. He later saw his mother 55 years later, when he took his family back to Haiti for visit. Henry spent his early childhood in Canandaigua, New York before his family later moved to Rochester. There he became the first black American to graduate from Rochester's East High School.

== Pro football ==
McDonald began playing professional football career in 1911 playing for the Oxford Pros. In his first professional game, McDonald played halfback for the Pros against the Rochester Jeffersons. The Jeffersons' owner and coach Leo Lyons promptly enticed him to play for the Jeffs, after being impressed with McDonald's speed. His ability to run fast earned him the nickname, "Motorcycle McDonald". According to McDonald, he could run a 100 yards in 10.2 seconds. The world record at the time for running 100 yards was 10 seconds flat.

In 1911, McDonald began his professional football career with the Rochester Jeffersons, who played in the New York Pro Football League. Throughout his professional career, McDonald had a difficult time making ends meet by playing football. He recalled that in all the years he played, that he never once took home more than $15 for one day of football. McDonald added that he had to play two games to get that much. As a result, McDonald often played a morning game in Rochester for the Jeffersons, then took a trolley to Canandaigua and played for the town team in the afternoon. While he did play baseball in the summer to complement his money made playing football, McDonald enjoyed playing halfback, since running backs were the star players and received the most money at the time. During the early 20th century the ball was soft and shaped like a watermelon. Teams would throw a couple of passes every game, but usually as a last resort.

== Incident with Greasy Neale ==
McDonald recalled only one negative racial incident during his 7 seasons of playing professional football. In 1917, McDonald and the Jeffersons (playing under the guise of the "Syracuse 47th Infantry") traveled to Ohio to play the Canton Bulldogs, led by Jim Thorpe. The trouble began when Canton's Greasy Neale threw McDonald out of bounds and snapped, "Black is black and white is white where I come from and the two don't mix." However McDonald, who was also a boxer, stood ready to fight Neale. However Jim Thorpe unexpectedly intervened. Thorpe then stated to Neale "We're here to play football". McDonald then recalled that he never had any trouble with Neale or any other Canton player afterwards.

== Baseball ==
Henry also played seven years in baseball's Negro leagues for the Cuban Giants and the Pittsburgh Colored Stars.

== Legacy ==
In 1990 McDonald was inducted in the inaugural class of the Geneva (New York) Sports Hall of Fame. He was also a charter member of the Black Athlete's Hall of Fame, along with Willie Mays, Jackie Robinson and Jim Brown. In 1937 he was named the head football coach at DeSales High School, making him the first black American to serve as a head high school football coach in New York State. McDonald served as coach at DeSales until 1943. He was also one of the first umpires, when Little League was organized. Geneva's Little League Park is named in his honor.

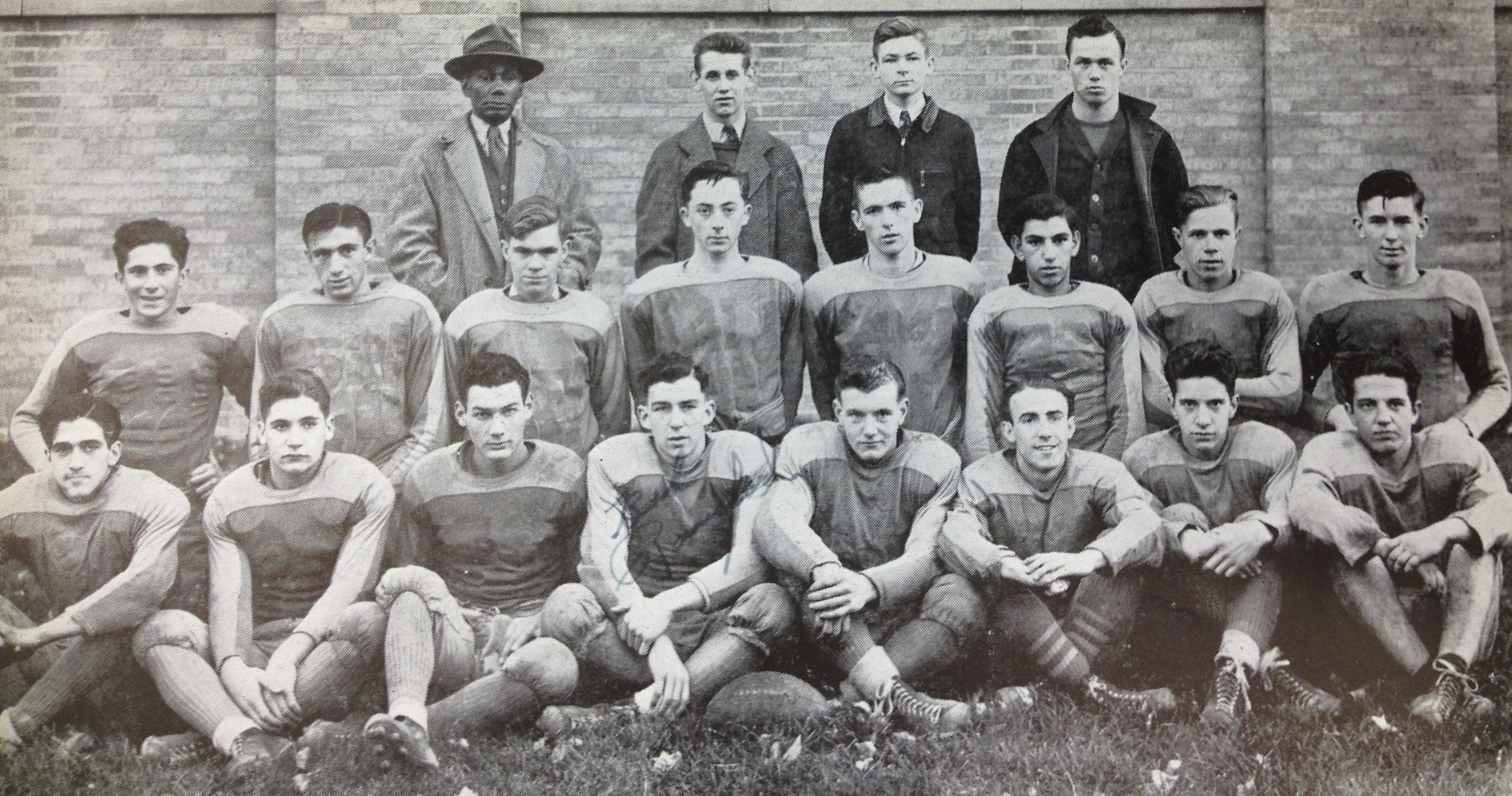
Coach McDonald and his 1940 DeSales High School football team.
