= Canandaigua Academy =

Public school in Canandaigua, New York, United States

Coordinates: 42°54′30″N 77°16′18″W

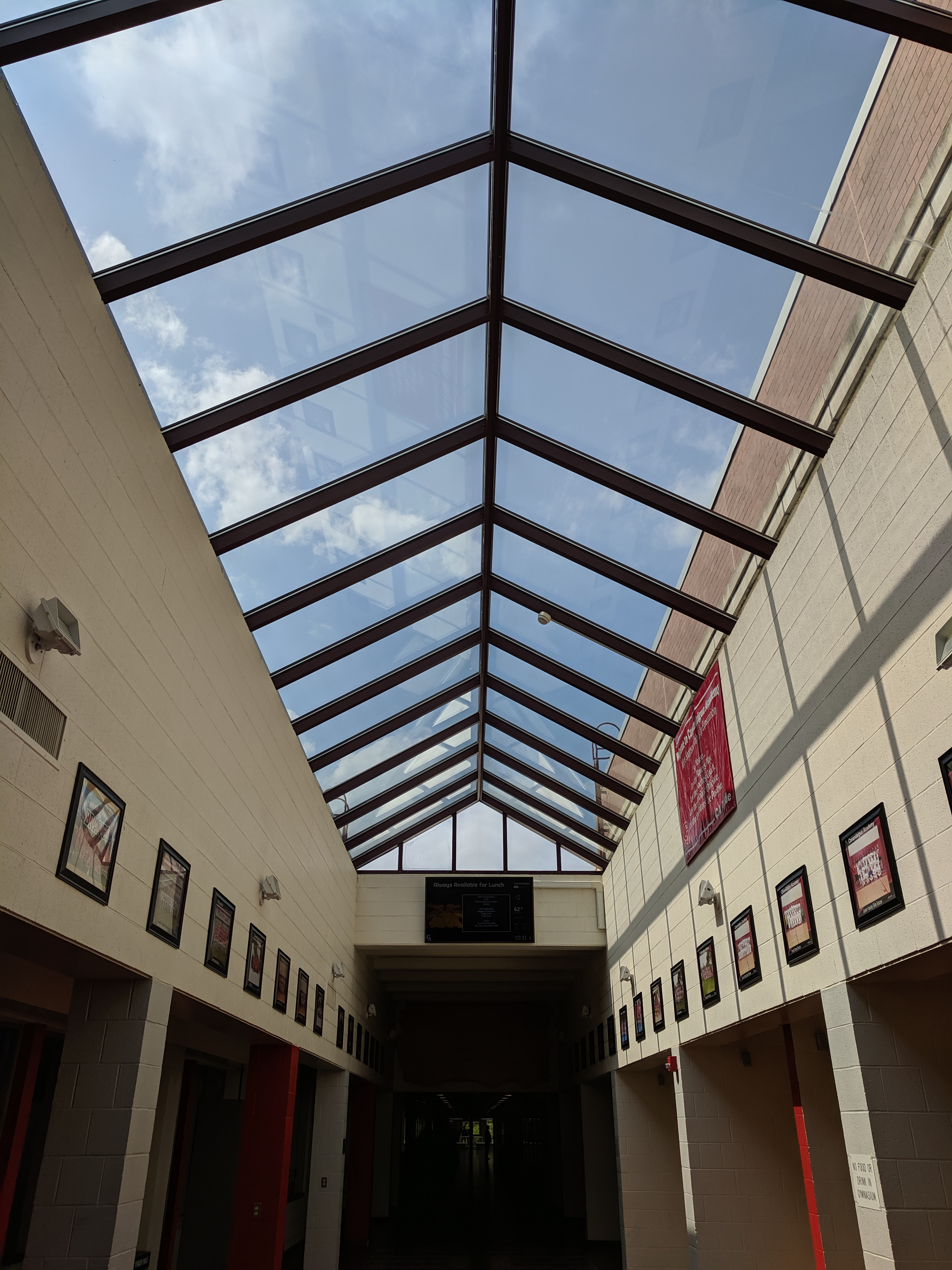

Location
- 435 East Street; Canandaigua, Ontario County, New York 14424; United States

Information
- School type: Public high school
- Motto: "One Community, Transforming Lives"
- Established: 1791; 235 years ago
- School district: Canandaigua City School District
- Superintendent: Jamie Farr
- Principal: Marissa Logue
- Grades: 9-12
- Colors: Cherry and grey
- Mascot: Gray Wolves
- Website: Canandaigua Academy

Canandaigua Academy is a high school (grades 9-12) in Canandaigua, New York, United States. It is part of the Canandaigua City School District. The school was named a national Blue Ribbon School of Excellence by the U.S. Department of Education in 1996. Jamie Farr is the Superintendent of Schools. Marissa Logue is the principal of Canandaigua Academy. There were 129 professional staff members and 1,105 students as of 2019.

In 2009 and 2010, Newsweek magazine named it one of the top 1,500 U.S. public high schools.

== History ==
Canandaigua Academy was founded in 1791 as a private boys' school. In its early years it was a key point for education in the general region and the majority of its students were boarding students.

It became a public high school in 1900, but retained "Academy" in its name.

The current Canandaigua Academy is the fourth academy since its founding in 1791. The first was located on Saltonstall Street (the site no longer exists); the second was on Main Street, now Fort Hill Apartments; the third was on Granger Street, and is now Canandaigua Middle School. The current building was built in 1991, and suits the needs of all departments.

On March 14, 2006, President George W. Bush visited Canandaigua Academy to inform the public about the Medicare prescription drug benefit, also called Medicare Part D.

In 2007, renovations were made on the southwestern wing of the building. The building's music wing was expanded to host additional classroom space, to be used by the Hochstein School of Music. Additionally, an expansive field house was appended to the gym on the southern side of the building to meet the needs of the Physical Education department.

On May 5, 2009, a student named Tom Kane killed himself with a shotgun in a bathroom stall at Canandaigua Academy. No additional casualties were caused.

In the summer of 2015, the boys' locker room was renovated for the 2015-2016 school year. The school began construction in 2016 on a new sports complex which was completed in 2017. Among the new facilities are a new stadium-style track, additional facilities, new parking areas, and concession stand facilities on the soccer field below the track. The school also installed turf fields.

== Extracurricular activities ==
=== Athletics ===
The school's sports teams are known as the Gray Wolves, and the school colors are cherry and gray. Until 2023, the sports teams were known as the Braves; however, the New York State Board of Regents announced that schools incorporating Indigenous mascots and team names would have to change their names. Canandaigua City Schools participates in Section V of the NYSPHAA.

In 2018 the Canandaigua Academy Cheerleaders won the NYSPHSAA Division 1 (Small) Championship, coached by Laura Burgess, Candace Foley, Kirstyn Morrell, and Maria Catalano.

Other state championships for the school include girls' volleyball and boys' lacrosse, both in 2009. The Canandaigua girls' swim team has won section V sectionals first place for 11 years straight. In 1999, the football team won a state championship.

In recent years, the Academy has hosted the Special Olympics, a day-long event which unites students and staff in support of disabled students and children in athletic competitions.

=== Music ===
Canandaigua Academy students are very active in the performing arts - with two concert bands (Symphonic Band and Wind Ensemble), a jazz band, a pep band (The Sound), two orchestras (Chamber Orchestra and Symphony Orchestra), and four choirs (Mixed Chorus, Women's Choir, Jazz Choir and Madrigal Choir). The Canandaigua Academy Music Department can be found on Twitter and YouTube. The Choral Department can be found on YouTube as "CA Choirs."

The Academy Music Department is led by band director Gregory Kane, who works alongside orchestra director Dr. Haley Moore, band director Matthew Erman, and choral director Sean Perry. The choral department was formerly led by nationally recognized music educator Amy Story. Retiring in 2015, Story was honored as the American Choral Directors' Association's "Helen Kemp Award" winner in 2012 for a lifetime commitment to vocal and educational excellence. She is a registered NYSSMA adjudicator, an active member of ACDA, a conductor for numerous honor choirs across New York and Pennsylvania, and continues to work with the Rochester Philharmonic Orchestra (RPO).

Since 2006, the Canandaigua Music Department has hosted a number of guest musicians and artist/educator visits including:

- Eric Whitacre
- Z. Randall Stroope
- Ingrid Jensen
- Camille Thurman

The Canandaigua Academy Players, led by Megan Davis, Luc Pereira, and Jim Kelly, has also been recognized for its achievements by Channel 10 News 2017 Rochester ROCS Best Theatre Company and Rochester Broadway Theater League's "Stars of Tomorrow," having taken high honors for many of its musicals. The Academy Players continue to produce a play in the fall and a musical in the spring.

In 2017, the Finger Lakes Opera moved their performing venue from the State University of New York at Geneseo to the performance hall at the Canandaigua Academy.[5]

== Notable alumni ==
- Frank C. Ball, cofounder of Ball Brothers Glass Manufacturing Company
- Alfred E. Bates, U.S. Army major general
- Pandora Boxx, drag queen
- John Mason Clarke, paleontologist
- Stephen A. Douglas, an American politician from Illinois known for his famous political rivalry with Abraham Lincoln, attended the Canandaigua Academy during the 1820s before moving to Illinois to study law. Douglas represented Illinois in the U.S. House of Representatives and U.S. Senate, and was an unsuccessful candidate for president in 1860.
- Scott Greene, former National Football League running back for the Carolina Panthers and the Indianapolis Colts. He went on to become head coach of the University of Rochester YellowJackets NCAA Division I football team.
- Carol Hirschmugl, research scientist and professor of physics
- Henry McDonald (American football), one of the first black professional football players ever, played halfback (American football) for the Rochester Jeffersons from 1911 to 1917.
- Michael E. O'Hanlon, senior fellow at The Brookings Institution
- Michael Park, actor
- Ryan Poles, general manager of the Chicago Bears
- Jefferson G. Thurber, state legislator in Michigan
