= 1918 in sports =

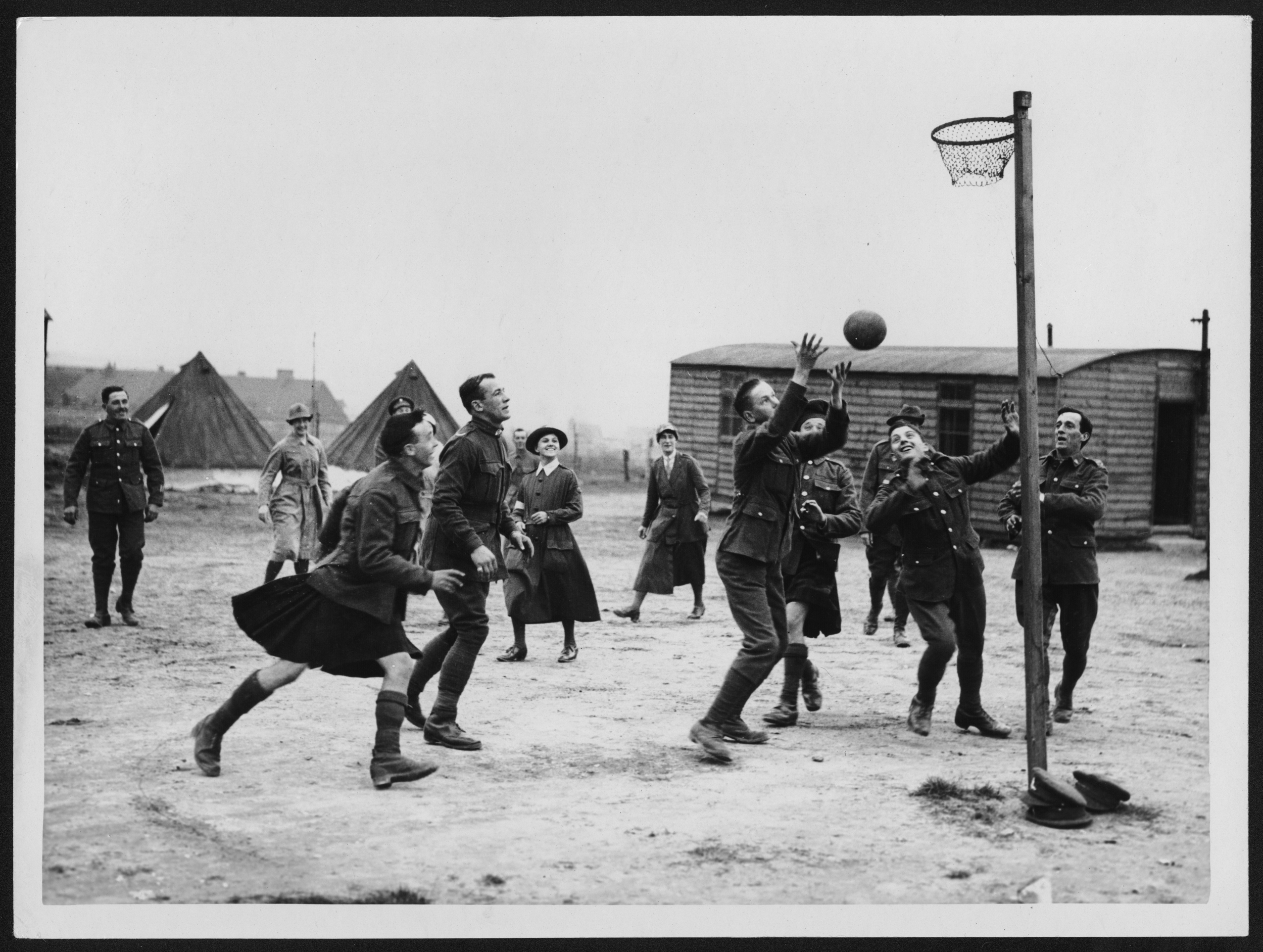

Note — many sporting events did not take place because of World War I or the 1918 flu pandemic

1918 in sports describes the year's events in world sport.

== American football ==
College championship

- College football national championship – Pittsburgh Panthers

Professional football

- Most teams shut down due to World War I and the flu pandemic; those that continue play are forced to delay the start of play until the middle of October or later
- Dayton Triangles defeat Detroit Heralds, both of whom continue full operations despite war and flu, to establish themselves as the strongest team in the US
- Buffalo Niagaras sign Tommy Hughitt for play in a citywide league, establishing a trend of expansion of top-level professional competition outside Ohio

== Association football ==
Europe

- There is no major football in Europe due to World War I

== Australian rules football ==
VFL Premiership

- South Melbourne wins the 22nd VFL Premiership beating Collingwood 9.8 (62) to 7.15 (57) in the 1918 VFL Grand Final.

South Australian Football League:

- not contested due to World War I

West Australian Football League:

- 21 September: East Fremantle 11.8 (74) defeat East Perth 8.5 (53) for their tenth WAFL premiership.

== Bandy ==
Sweden

- Championship final – IFK Uppsala 4–1 IK Sirius (replay following 2–2 draw)

== Baseball ==
World Series

- 5–11 September — Boston Red Sox (AL) defeats Chicago Cubs (NL) to win the 1918 World Series by 4 games to 2

Events

- Babe Ruth leads the American League in home runs for the first time, hitting 11
- 2 September — professional baseball is curtailed to accelerate mobilisation for war

== Boxing ==
Events

- No world titles change hands in 1918 but Jack Dempsey, with a series of knockouts including one against Battling Levinsky, is now the main challenger to Jess Willard.

Lineal world champions

- World Heavyweight Championship – Jess Willard
- World Light Heavyweight Championship – Battling Levinsky
- World Middleweight Championship – Mike O'Dowd
- World Welterweight Championship – Ted "Kid" Lewis
- World Lightweight Championship – Benny Leonard
- World Featherweight Championship – Johnny Kilbane
- World Bantamweight Championship – Pete Herman
- World Flyweight Championship – Jimmy Wilde

== Canadian football ==
Grey Cup

- not contested due to World War I

== Cricket ==
Events

- There is no first-class cricket in England, Australia, South Africa or the West Indies due to World War I. A number of first-class matches are arranged in New Zealand but are not part of any official competition.

India

- Bombay Quadrangular – Hindus shared with Parsees

New Zealand

- Plunket Shield – not contested

== Cycling ==
Tour de France

- not contested due to World War I

Giro d'Italia

- not contested due to World War I

== Figure skating ==
World Figure Skating Championships

- not contested due to World War I

== Golf ==
Events

- All major championships are cancelled due to World War I

== Horse racing ==
England

- Grand National – not held due to World War I
- 1,000 Guineas Stakes – Ferry
- 2,000 Guineas Stakes – Gainsborough
- The Derby – Gainsborough
- The Oaks – My Dear
- St. Leger Stakes – Gainsborough

Australia

- Melbourne Cup – Night Watch

Canada

- King's Plate – Springside

Ireland

- Irish Grand National – Ballyboggan
- Irish Derby Stakes – King John

USA

- Kentucky Derby – Exterminator
- Preakness Stakes – not contested as a single race
- Belmont Stakes – Johren

== Ice hockey ==
Stanley Cup

- The temporary Toronto Arenas team defeats the Montreal Canadiens 10–7 to win the inaugural National Hockey League (NHL) championship
- Vancouver Millionaires defeats Seattle Metropolitans 3–2 to win the Pacific Coast Hockey Association championship
- 20–30 March — Toronto Arenas (NHL) defeats Vancouver Millionaires (PCHA) in the 1918 Stanley Cup Final by 3 games to 2

Events

- 2 January — Montreal Wanderers disbands following destruction of its home venue by fire
- Allan Cup is won by Kitchener Greenshirts

== Motor racing ==
Events

- No major races are held anywhere worldwide due to World War I

== Rowing ==
The Boat Race

- Oxford and Cambridge Boat Race – not contested due to World War I

== Rugby league ==
England

- All first-class competitions are cancelled due to World War I

Australia

- NSW Premiership – South Sydney (outright winner)

New Zealand

- 1918 New Zealand rugby league season

== Rugby union ==
Five Nations Championship

- Five Nations Championship series is not contested due to World War I

== Speed skating ==
Speed Skating World Championships

- not contested due to World War I

== Tennis ==
Australia

- Australian Men's Singles Championship – not contested due to World War I

England

- Wimbledon Men's Singles Championship – not contested due to World War I
- Wimbledon Women's Singles Championship – not contested due to World War I

France

- French Men's Singles Championship – not contested due to World War I
- French Women's Singles Championship – not contested due to World War I

USA

- American Men's Singles Championship – Lindley Murray (USA) defeats Bill Tilden (USA) 6–3 6–1 7–5
- American Women's Singles Championship – Molla Bjurstedt Mallory (Norway) defeats Eleanor E. Goss (USA) 6–4 6–3

Davis Cup

- 1918 International Lawn Tennis Challenge – not contested
