= Gillo =

Gillo is a given name and surname.

Notable people with the given name include:

- Gillo Dorfles (1910–2018), Italian art critic, painter, and philosopher
- Gillo Pontecorvo (1919–2006), Italian filmmaker

Notable people with the surname include:

- Hank Gillo (1894–1948), American football player

Notable people with the nickname include:

- Michele Frangilli (1976-), Italian archer
