= Max Hicks =

Max Hicks may refer to:

- Max Hicks (American football)
- Max Hicks (rugby union)
