= Canandaigua City School District =

School district in New York, United States

Address
- 143 North Pearl St. Canandaigua, New York, 14424; United States
- Coordinates: 42°53′24″N 77°17′34″W

District information
- Type: Public
- Motto: "One community, transforming lives"
- Grades: UPK-12
- Established: 1791; 235 years ago
- Superintendent: Jamie Farr
- NCES District ID: 3606330

Students and staff
- Enrollment: 3,254
- Faculty: 626
- District mascot: Grey Wolves
- Colors: Cherry and gray

Other information
- Website: www.canandaiguaschools.org

The Canandaigua City School District is a public school district in New York State, United States, that serves approximately 3,650 students in the city of Canandaigua and the town of Canandaigua and portions of the towns of Bristol, Farmington, East Bloomfield, Gorham, Hopewell and South Bristol in Ontario County, with an approximate operating budget of $76 million.

The student-teacher ratio is 10:1.

The District motto is "One Community, Transforming Lives".

The District mission statement is "Explore - Enrich - Empower".

Jamie Farr is the Superintendent of Schools.

== Board of education ==
The Board of Education (BOE) consists of nine members who serve rotating 5-year terms. Elections are held each May for board members and to vote on the School District budget.

Current board members are:

- Jeanie Grimm - President
- Julianne Miller - Vice President
- Amy Calabrese
- Milton Johnson
- Megan Personale
- John A. Polimeni
- Dr. Jen Schneider
- Jennifer Tessendorf
- Beth Thomas

All of the District's schools have been accredited by the Middle States Association of Colleges and Schools, making its K-12 program one of the few such fully accredited programs in New York State.

== Principals ==
=== Canandaigua Primary School (Grades UPK-2) ===
- Principal - Emily Bonadonna
- Assistant Principal - Michele Reynolds

=== Canandaigua Elementary School (Grades 3-5) ===
- Principal - Brian Amesbury
- Assistant Principal - Lindsay Lazenby

=== Canandaigua Middle School (Grades 6-8) ===
- Principal - Kris VanDuyne
- Assistant Principal - Theron Chinn

=== Canandaigua Academy (Grades 9-12) ===
- Principal - Marissa Logue
- Assistant Principals - Cary Burke, Eric Jordan, Kaitlin LaFave, Rachel Schading

== Performance ==
The American School Board Journal has named the District a "Magna Award" winner five times through 2006.

The Academy’s library website was named a 2003 "International Best of the Web" site for large high schools. Students have access to each school's library from home via a 2003 NYSPRA "Award of Excellence" web site. The District supplies individual personal laptop computers, fully secured, to all students in grades 6-12, with plans for all students in Grades K-12 to have such units by 2019.

The United States Department of Education awarded its highest honor, the Blue Ribbon School of Excellence Award, to Canandaigua schools in 1986 and 1996.

In February 2002, the school earned the designation of "International Baccalaureate World School," offering the IB Diploma Programme. 17 graduates received the diploma in 2007. 31 are enrolled to receive the diploma in 2014.

In November 2007, a first-grade class at Canandaigua Primary School won a national prize for a video they created that encourages girls to pursue technology careers. They were selected first from 85 schools in the United States, Australia and New Zealand.

In January 2014, the Middle School was recognized as a New York State School of Character and later was recognized as a National School of Character by the Character Education Partnership (CEP), a national agency based in Washington, DC.

== 2009 ==
On May 5, 2009, just after 11 a.m., a 17-year-old senior male student named Thomas Kane committed suicide while in a high school boys' bathroom. For security measures, the school entered lockdown (all students and staff held in place behind closed/locked interior doors) in case the incident had connections to a larger shooting or some other incident. Responding police authorities determined that the gunshot wound to Thomas Kane was self-inflicted and an isolated incident. Students were evacuated to the middle school, and the high school was thoroughly searched and cleared. Police discovered 30 rounds of ammunition on Kane and in his locker, along with improvised incendiary weapons, or molotov cocktails. This suggests that a shooting spree may have been planned. However, no such action was carried out.
