= Paul Parduhn =

American businessman (died 1934)

- Born: C.J. Parduhn; 1892; United States
- Died: 1946 (aged 53–54)
- Occupation(s): Businessman, sports team owner
- Known for: Wealthy founder and owner of the American football team the Hammond Bobcats which later became the Hammond Pros
- Spouse: Artella Price (m. 1919; died 1934)

C.J. (Paul) Parduhn (1892-1946) was an American wealthy owner of several car dealerships and President of City Fuel & Supply Co. In 1917, he formed a semi-pro team called the Hammond Bobcats.

== American football team ==
The team of all-stars earned the nick name the "$20,000 Beauties." with players like QB Milt Ghee, Doc Hauser, Frank Blocker, Paddy Driscoll, Hugh Blaylock, Guil Falcon and future Hall of Famer George Halas. Known for his willingness to spend money, most of the top pro football talent of his time played for Parduhn at one time or another.

Parduhn's team was also known as the Hammond All-Stars and in 1919, Parduhn was arrested for passing off bogus checks to his players. Still, his Bobcats were one of the nation's best teams in 1919 with top talent like Charley Brickley leading the way. His partner in this team was Dr. Alva Andrew Young whom he would give control over to after Halas left the team to found the Dacatur Staleys and basically took the entire Bobcats team with him. The team would be reformed using another name the team was known by, the Hammond Pros, becoming founding members of the American Professional Football Association in 1920 (better known to us today as the National Football League).

== Personal life ==
Parduhn married Artella Price on May 26, 1919 who preceded him in death on March 1, 1934.
