= Jack Forsyth =

American football coach

- Captain Rudolph Propst of Syracuse (L) with Jack Forsyth, 1912

Profile
- Position: Back

Personal information
- Born: May 4, 1892; Rochester, New York, U.S.
- Died: December 19, 1966 (aged 74); Rochester, New York

Career information
- College: Rochester

Career history
- Rochester Jeffersons (1919–1921)
- Coaching profile at Pro Football Reference
- Stats at Pro Football Reference

Walter Scott "Jack" Forsyth (May 4, 1892 – December 19, 1966) was a professional football coach for the Rochester Jeffersons of the American Professional Football Association (restructured as the National Football League in 1922). As coach of the Jeffs from 1919 through 1921, Forsyth is remembered by sports historians as one of the first head coaches in the NFL.

As a college athlete, Forsyth played for the University of Rochester in three sports—football, ice hockey, and baseball—from the fall of 1910 until his graduation in 1914. He was regarded by sportswriters of the day as an outstanding college football player at both the fullback and halfback position.

Forsyth was a graduate of Columbia Law School in 1919 and was a practicing attorney for nearly 50 years.

== Biography ==
=== Collegiate years ===
Jack Forsyth was born May 4, 1892 in Rochester, New York. He attended West High School in that city.

Forsyth stayed in town to attend the University of Rochester, where he gained fame as — in the words of one Buffalo sportswriter — "the greatest plunging fullback who ever donned a University of Rochester uniform." His brother, Benjamin Forsyth, played the same position for the same school. Jack was elected team captain for the Yellowjackets' 1912 season, his junior year. He spent much of his playing time at the critical left halfback position.

The Forsyth brothers also played hockey for the school's inaugural team in 1912, with Jack initially taking on the role of team manager, in charge of booking games. Within a few weeks, Jack was elected hockey team captain and passed on the role of manager to another person, however.

Forsyth also played baseball for the Rochester varsity team, holding down the second base position.

It was on the gridiron that Jack excelled. One observer said of him: "Captain Forsyth is that rare, if not almost unknown species of star athlete, who never loafs and always puts the same pep and vim into practice that he does into a game. Unfortunately for Rochester, Forsyth can play college football for only four years."

Forsyth graduated from the University of Rochester in 1914.

=== Law school ===
After graduation, Forsyth decided to follow his father into the law, attending Columbia Law School, from which he graduated in 1917. While at Columbia he kept his toe in the world of sports by coaching the Erasmus Hall football team of Brooklyn.

Normalcy was interrupted by American entry World War I. After leaving Columbia, Forsyth served in the United States Navy as a lieutenant.

=== Professional football coach ===
Athletics beckoned. After being released from the military, Forsyth returned to Rochester, where he spent his autumns as coach of the city's top professional team, the Rochester Jeffersons. Forsyth coached the team for three seasons — 1919, 1920, and 1921, winning a total of 16 games, losing 8, and tying 4.

The last two of these seasons, Rochester was a charter member of the American Professional Football Association (APFY) — an organization which reconstituted itself as the National Football League (NFL) in 1922. Forsyth is thus remembered by sports historians as one of the first head coaches of the NFL, with a two-year record of 8 wins, 6 losses, and 2 ties.

=== Life after football ===
Attorney Jack Forsyth hams it up with his secretary at the Rochester Club's second annual "Bosses' Night," December 1, 1948.

After passing the bar in 1919, Forsyth went into legal practice with his father, attorney George D. Forsyth. He remained in the profession for half a century, eventually going into practice with his son, Donald A. Forsyth.

Forsyth ran for political office twice during the decade of the 1930s, for local office in the town of Brighton and for county office in Monroe County. Both times he ran as a Democrat; both times he lost.

Outside of work, Forsyth was a yachtsman, a member of the American Legion, Veterans of Foreign Wars, and Lions Club. He served a term as president of the Rochester Bar Association from 1944 to 1945. He was the father of two daughters and a son.

=== Death and legacy ===
Jack Forsyth died on December 19, 1966, at Highland Hospital in Rochester following a six-month illness. He was 74 years old at the time of his death.

Forsyth is remembered as one of the fourteen original head coaches of the National Football League and as one of the leading backs of the early years of University of Rochester Yellowjackets football.

== Head coaching record ==
Year	Team	W	L	T
1919	Rochester Jeffersons (independent)	6	2	1
1920	Rochester Jeffersons (APFA)	6	3	2
1921	Rochester Jeffersons (APFA)	2	3	0
1921	Rochester Jeffersons (non-league)	2	0	1
Totals	(3 years)	16	8	4
