= Tony Catalano =

American football player (1895–1980)

Profile
- Position: Guard

Personal information
- Born: April 13, 1895; Indianapolis, Indiana, U.S.
- Died: July 25, 1980 (aged 85); Boise, Idaho, U.S.

Career information
- College: none

Career history
- Hammond Pros (1920)

Career NFL statistics
- Games played: 1
- Stats at Pro Football Reference

Anthony Emil Catalano (April 13, 1895 – July 25, 1980) was an Italian-American wrestler, football player and boxer. He played one game in the National Football League (NFL) for the Hammond Pros. Catalano did not attend college.
