= Klinks Meyers =

American football player (1890–1933)

Profile
- Position: Halfback

Personal information
- Born: 1890; La Crosse, Wisconsin, U.S.
- Died: January 20, 1933; Hammond, Indiana, U.S.
- Listed weight: 165 lb (75 kg)

Career history
- Hammond Pros (1920)

Career statistics
- Games played: 3
- Games started: 2

Fred Howard "Klinks" Meyers (1890 – January 20, 1933) was an American football player. He played professionally for one season, 1920, with the Hammond Pros in the American Professional Football Association (APFA)–now known as the National Football League (NFL). Meyers also played with the Detroit Heralds.

Meyers died on January 20, 1933, at St. Margaret's Hospital in Hammond, Indiana. He had suffered a skull fracture four days earlier in an automobile accident, in nearby Highland.
