= 1915 Maine Black Bears football team =

American college football season

1915 Maine Black Bears football

MIAA champion
- Conference: Maine Intercollegiate Athletic Association
- Record: 6–3 (3–0 MIAA)
- Head coach: Tommy Hughitt (1st season)
- Captain: Charles Ruffner
- Home stadium: Alumni Field

The 1915 Maine Black Bears football team was an American football team that represented the University of Maine during the 1915 college football season. The team compiled a 6–3 record. Charles Ruffner was the team captain.

In March 1915, Tommy Hughitt was hired as Maine's head football coach. Hughitt had been the quarterback of Fielding H. Yost's Michigan football teams from 1912 to 1914. Hughitt was credited with bringing Yost's system to Maine: "Hughitt showed the effectiveness of the Yost system of coaching by developing a bunch of green material, a team which staged a real 'comeback' after a bad start last year."

== Schedule ==
Date	Time	Opponent	Site	Result	Source
September 18		Fort McKinley*	Alumni Field; Orono, ME	W 7–0	
September 25		at Yale*	Yale Field; New Haven, CT	L 0–37	
October 2		at Dartmouth*	Hanover, NH	L 0–34	
October 9		Vermont*	Alumni Field; Orono, ME	W 14–0	
October 16	3:00 p.m.	Boston College*	Alumni Field; Orono, ME	W 14–0	
October 23		Bates	Alumni Field; Orono, ME	W 29–14	
October 30		Colby	Alumni Field; Orono, ME	W 31–6	
November 6		at Bowdoin	Whittier Field; Brunswick, ME	W 23–13	
November 13		at Army*	The Plain; West Point, NY	L 0–24	
*Non-conference game; All times are in Eastern time
