= Bill Kellogg (American football) =

American football player (1897–1969)

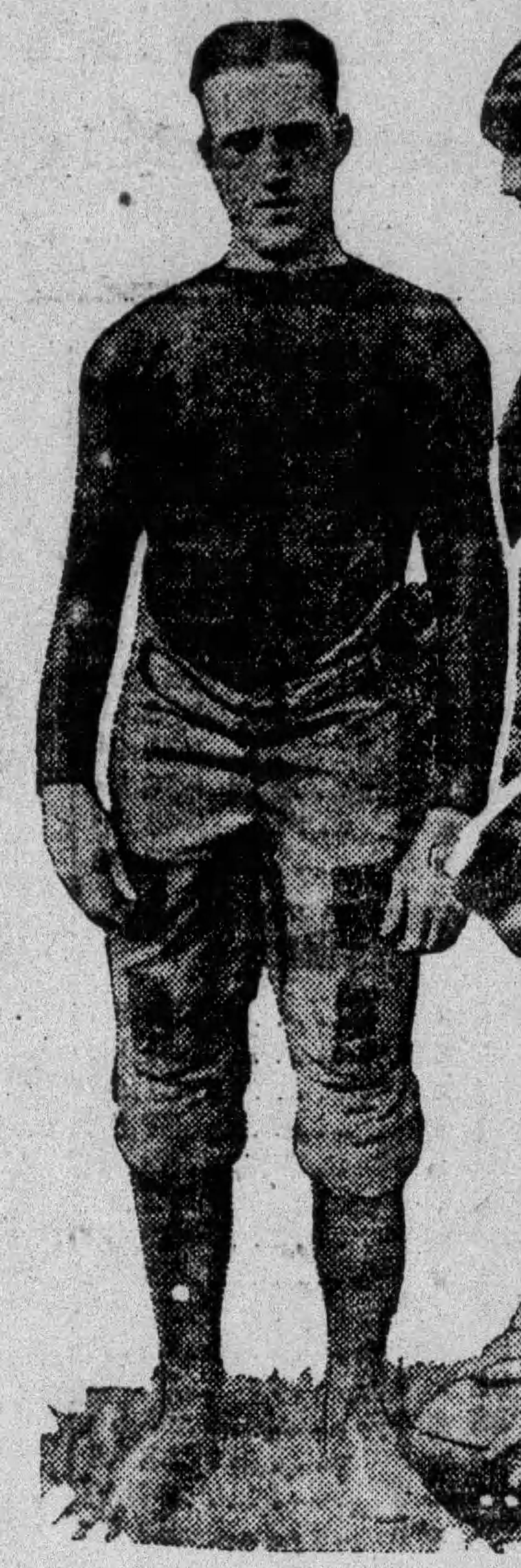
- Bill Kellogg, 1922

Profile
- Positions: Tackle, guard

Personal information
- Born: March 3, 1897; Pittsburgh, U.S.
- Died: November 28, 1969 (aged 72); Syracuse, New York, U.S.
- Listed height: 5 ft 10 in (1.78 m)
- Listed weight: 178 lb (81 kg)

Career information
- High school: Allegany (NY)
- College: Indiana (PA), Syracuse

Career history
- Frankford Yellow Jackets (1924); Rochester Jeffersons (1925)

William J. Kellogg (March 3, 1897 – November 28, 1969) was an American football player.

Kellogg was born in Pittsburgh in 1897. He attended Allegany-Limestone High School in Allegany, New York. He then attended Indiana University of Pennsylvania and Syracuse University. While at Syracuse, he played for the varsity football team from 1920 to 1922, helping to lead the team to an overall record of 19-5-3 record in those three years. He was known as "Northside Bill" during his time at Syracuse. He also played for the basketball and baseball teams at Syracuse. He was the first Syracuse athlete to win varsity letters in three major sports. When his varsity eligibility ended with the 1922 season, he remained a law student at Syracuse and coached the freshman football team.

He played professional football in the National Football League (NFL) for the Frankford Yellow Jackets in 1924 and the Rochester Jeffersons in 1925. He appeared in nine NFL games.

When his playing career ended, Kellogg worked as an industrial engineer for the Rollway Bearing Company. He lived in the Syracuse are for more than 30 years. He died in 1969 at age 72 in Community-General Hospital in Syracuse.
