= Gary Elks =

Defunct American football team

General information
- Founded: 1920
- Folded: 1923
- Stadium: Emerson High School Field (1920); Gleason Park (1920-1923)
- Headquartered: Gary, Indiana

Team history
- Gary Elks (1920-1923)

League / conference affiliations
- Independent (1920-1923)

The Gary Elks were an Independent American football team that played four seasons. From 1920 to 1923.

== 1920 ==
They 1920 season was their first season. They started the season with a 40–0 win over Forest Park Othello A.C. The win followed with 4 more wins until there was a 0–0 tie against the Chicago Thorn Tornadoes. They played their next game against the Hammond Pros, an APFA team. They won the game 7 to 6. They played their first six games at Emerson High School Field, before they moved to Gleason Park. They finished the season with a 8-0-1 record.

== 1921 ==
They opened the 1921 season with wins against the Evanston Washington Parks, Morocco Independents, Chicago Staym-Foresters, and Chicago Thorn-Tornadoes before losing their first ever game against Chicago Amos A.A. They had three more wins before losing to the APFA Chicago Cardinals. They won the week prior against the Hammond Pros, who they beat the year before. The next week they lost their third game of the season to the Chicago Morris Supremes.

== 1922 ==
In 1922 they had a 6-2-1 record. They had scheduled to play 4 games against NFL opponents but only played two; they played two games against the Hammond Pros, who they had played in prior years. They won one of the games against the Pros, winning it 9–6 after losing 15-0 the prior game. They played all but one of their games at Gleason Park.

== 1923 ==
1923 was their last season. They had a 2-2-2 record excluding the game against the Waukegan Elks where no records were found. They had scheduled 3 games against NFL opponents but only played one; a 7–6 loss against the Cleveland Indians.
