= Cecil Grigg =

American football player and coach (1891–1968)

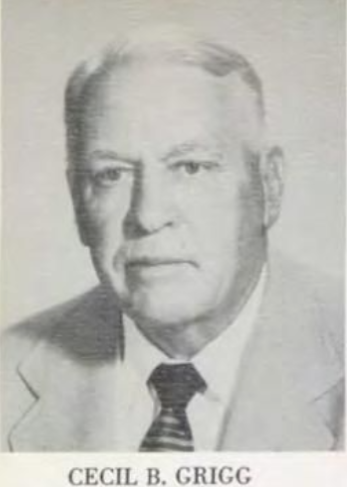
- Grigg, c. 1961

Profile
- Position: Running back

Personal information
- Born: February 15, 1891; Nashville, Tennessee, U.S.
- Died: September 5, 1968 (aged 77); Houston, Texas, U.S.

Career history

Playing
- 1915: Dallas
- 1919–1923: Canton Bulldogs
- 1924–1925: Rochester Jeffersons
- 1926: New York Giants
- 1927: Frankford Yellow Jackets

Coaching
- 1925: Rochester Jeffersons
- 1928–1933: Austin
- 1936–1966: Rice (baseball & football)

Awards and highlights
- 2× NFL champion (1922, 1923); Ohio League champion (1919)
- Coaching profile at Pro Football Reference

Cecil Burkett "Tex" Grigg (February 15, 1891 – September 5, 1968) was an American football player and coach. He played running back for eight seasons in the National Football League (NFL) for the Canton Bulldogs, the Rochester Jeffersons, the New York Giants, and the Frankford Yellow Jackets. He made his professional debut in 1919 with the Bulldogs who were still members of the Ohio League, the direct predecessor to the NFL. Grigg then went on to coach for many years as Jess Neely's backfield coach at Rice.

== Head coaching record ==
=== College football ===
| Year | Team | Overall | Conference | Standing | Bowl/playoffs |
|---|---|---|---|---|---|
Austin Kangaroos (Texas Conference) (1928–1932)
| 1928 | Austin | 4–6 | 2–2 | 3rd | |
| 1929 | Austin | 3–6 | 3–2 | 3rd | |
| 1930 | Austin | 3–5–1 | 2–2–1 | 3rd | |
| 1931 | Austin | 3–5–1 | 3–2 | 3rd | |
| 1932 | Austin | 0–9 | 0–4 | 5th | |
| Austin: | | 13–31–2 | 10–12–1 | | |
| Total: | | 13–31–2 | | | |
