= 1918 Buffalo Niagaras season =

American football team season

- Head coach: Tommy Hughitt
- Home stadium: Buffalo Baseball Park

Results
- Record: 5–0
- Playoffs: BSPFL Champions

The 1918 Buffalo Niagaras season was a top-level semi-professional football team in Buffalo, New York. The team, which was the successor to the Buffalo All-Stars (1915–1917) and predecessor to the 1919 Buffalo Prospects, was one of four teams that played in the newly created Buffalo Semi-Professional Football League. The league was created to accommodate the travel restrictions put in place because of World War I and the 1918 flu pandemic, which required a delay in the start of the season (not starting until October 27) and prevented Buffalo's teams from leaving the city.

Because of the greatly fewer number of teams playing across the country in 1918, the Niagaras had greater access to the remaining players who were not in the war. The 1918 Niagaras, whose name was borrowed from an earlier (and later) semi-pro team, were the first Buffalo team to employ former Michigan Wolverines and Youngstown Patricians quarterback Ernest "Tommy" Hughitt; Hughitt would go on to play for the Prospects and its NFL successors through 1924 and live in Buffalo for the rest of his life. Under Hughitt's leadership, Buffalo dominated the makeshift four-team league and compiled a perfect season of five wins, a sixth game was scheduled but canceled due to it being rendered moot. Only in one game did the Niagaras give up any points at all, surrendering a single touchdown and extra point to the Buffalo Hydraulics through the entire season. Because of the travel restrictions, the Niagaras were not allowed to challenge the other teams in the nation (such as the first-place Dayton Triangles, the still-active Detroit Heralds or even Buffalo's regional rivals, the Rochester Jeffersons), leaving it unknown how the team would have fared compared to the rest of the country.

== Schedule ==
Game	Date	Opponent	Result	Record
1	October 20	Buffalo Hydraulics	Cancelled	0–0
2	October 27	Buffalo Hydraulics	W 20–0	1–0
3	November 3	Buffalo Pierce-Arrows	W 27–0	2–0
4	November 10	Pittsburgh Colored Stars	W 24–0	3–0
5	November 17	Buffalo Hydraulics	Postponed	3–0
6	November 24	Buffalo Hydraulics	W 18–7	4–0
7	November 28	Buffalo Pierce-Arrows	W 20–0	5–0
8	N/A	Pittsburgh Colored Stars	Canceled	5–0
