= 1919 Rochester Jeffersons season =

American football team season

- Head coach: Jack Forsyth

Results
- Record: 7–2–2
- Division place: 1st (Rochester circuit)
- Playoffs: Lost state title to Buffalo Prospects

The 1919 Rochester Jeffersons season was the final season for the Rochester Jeffersons prior to its acceptance into the American Professional Football Association (now the National Football League). Participating in the loose New York Pro Football League, the Jeffersons resumed full play after playing only two games in 1918. The Jeffersons won the Rochester circuit with a 7–1–1 record, mostly against lower-level upstate teams, only to lose the New York Pro Championship to their regional rivals, the Buffalo Prospects.

== Schedule ==
Week	Date	Opponent	Result	Record
1	October 5	Fort Niagara	W 20–7	1–0
2	October 12	Flint Athletic Club	L 6–13	1–1
3	October 25	All-Syracuse	T 6–6	1–1–1
4	November 1 or 2	Lancaster Malleables	W 29–7	2–1–1
5	November 2 or 3	Fort Ontario (Oswego, NY)	W 32–0	3–1–1
6	November 9	All-South Buffalo	W 69–0	4–1–1
7	November 17	Rochester Senecas	W 27–6	5–1–1
8	November 23 or 24	at Rochester Scalpers	W 20–0	6–1–1
9	November 27	Buffalo Prospects	T 0–0	6–1–2
10	November 30	Buffalo Prospects	L 0–20	6–2–2
