= Jerry Noonan =

American football player (1898–1971)

Profile
- Positions: End, Fullback, Halfback, Quarterback

Personal information
- Born: August 4, 1898; Bayonne, New Jersey, U.S.
- Died: August 1971 (aged 73); West Covina, California, U.S.
- Listed height: 6 ft 1 in (1.85 m)
- Listed weight: 189 lb (86 kg)

Career information
- College: University of Notre Dame, Fordham College

Career history
- New York Brickley Giants (1921); Rochester Jeffersons (1921–1924)
- Stats at Pro Football Reference

Gerald Michael Noonan (August 4, 1898 – 1971) was a Fordham All-American who played professional football. "Jerry's" football career included playing at Santa Clara College, Oakland and playing on the Olympic Club Football Team in San Francisco. He played in the National Football League (NFL) with the Rochester Jeffersons and the New York Brickley Giants (not related to the modern-day New York Giants). His brother George was selected for the Olympic Hockey Team and played in the NFL for Hammond, Indiana.

While with Jeffersons in 1924, Noonan became the team's head coach, serving as a player-coach.

Prior to joining the NFL, Noonan played college football at the University of Notre Dame as well as Fordham College.

Gerald (Born:Gerard) was one of six sons born to Judge Thomas Francis Patrick Noonan (New Jersey Law Journal) and Hannah P. Kelly. Five of the six sons, Thomas III, Jerry, George, Vincent, and Mathew served in World War I and sister Mary served as a nurse with the Red Cross. Gerard became Lt. Gerald M. Noonan in 1917 when he enlisted with the Royal Flying Corps in Canada, because he was not of age to be recruited for the American Air division. Gerard first saw service at the Mexican border in the Summer of 1916 with his brothers Thomas and George as a members of the famed Essex Troop (essextroop.org/1916).Thomas was later with the U.S. Aviation Corps in Texas and George was at Anniston detailed to military police duty. Gerard was sent to France during duty and survived being shot down over Europe.

Gerard's father, Thomas F. Noonan Jr., was elected reading clerk of the Assembly in 1883, he was appointed Judge of the Bayonne District Court in 1890 and completed his law studies in the office of Job H. Lippincott. Now of the Supreme Court he was admitted as counselor in 1892. He achieved a reputation all over the State as a political speaker in the Democratic side of politics. He was a delegate to the Democratic National Convention for 20 Years. Gerard's Mother, Hannah P. Kelly (married as Anna Kelly) was a well-known opera singer.

Gerard had four sisters: Mary (Red Cross), Elisabeth (Actress/Real Estate), and film stars Molly O'Day (Hollywood Walk of Fame) and Sally O'Neil, who were well known in their era.
