= Hal Clark =

American football player (1893–1973)

Profile
- Positions: End, back

Personal information
- Born: October 25, 1893; Rochester, New York
- Died: July 9, 1973 (aged 79); Rochester, New York
- Listed height: 5 ft 10 in (1.78 m)
- Listed weight: 195 lb (88 kg)

Career information
- High school: Cathedral (NY)

Career history
- Rochester Jeffersons (1920–1925)

Career statistics
- Games: 27

Harold E. Clark (October 25, 1893 – July 9, 1973) was an American football player. A native of Rochester, New York, he attended Cathedral High School. In the earliest years of the National Football League (NFL), he played professional football as an end and back for the Rochester Jeffersons. He appeared in 27 NFL games between 1920 and 1925. He served in the U.S. Navy during World War I and was employed by Security Trust Co. after his football career ended.
