= Bill Brace =

American football player (1895–1972)

No. 10
- Positions: Center, guard

Personal information
- Born: November 19, 1895; Sheridan, New York, U.S.
- Died: January 7, 1972 (aged 76); Jamestown, New York, U.S.
- Listed height: 6 ft 0 in (1.83 m)
- Listed weight: 180 lb (82 kg)

Career information
- High school: Dunkirk (Dunkirk, New York)
- College: Brown

Career history
- Buffalo All-Americans (1920–1922)

Career statistics
- Games played: 31
- Games started: 24
- Fumble recoveries: 1
- Touchdowns: 1
- Stats at Pro Football Reference

George Wells Brace (November 19, 1895 – January 7, 1972) was an American professional football player who was a center and guard in the National Football League (NFL) for the Buffalo All-Americans. He played college football for the Brown Bears.

Brace played in 31 games, over three seasons, for the All-Americans from 1920 to 1922 and started in 24 of them at left guard. He blocked a punt and returned it for a touchdown against the Rochester Jeffersons on October 31, 1920.
