= Chicago Boosters =

Defunct American football team

General information
- Founded: 1920
- Folded: 1921
- Stadium: Harrison Tech Field (1920, 1 game), DePaul Field (1920), Logan Square Park (1920-1921)
- Headquartered: Chicago, Illinois

Team history
- Chicago Boosters (1920-1921)

League / conference affiliations
- Independent (1920-1921)

The Chicago Boosters were an Independent American football team that played two seasons from 1920 to 1921. They played in one APFA game.

== 1920 ==
The team was founded in 1920, starting the season with a tie against the Green Bay Packers. Their second game's score is unknown. Their third game was a 0–0 tie against the Chicago Amos A.A. They ended up playing 15 games in 1920. Their record was 7-1-6 (excluding their second game which had an unknown score). Their only game against an APFA opponent was a 27–0 win over the Hammond Pros. They used three different home stadiums in 1920; they played in Harrison Tech Field, DePaul Field, and Logan Square Park.

== 1921 ==
They opened the 1921 season with a 13–0 loss against the Green Bay Packers. They then had a 3–0 win over the Moline Indians. They finished the 1921 season with a 4-2-3 record. The 1921 season was their last.
