= Murray Shelton =

American football player (1893–1985)

No. 5
- Position: End

Personal information
- Born: April 20, 1893; Dunkirk, New York, U.S.
- Died: August 14, 1985 (aged 92); Columbia, Missouri, U.S.

Career information
- College: Cornell University

Career history
- 1915: Cornell
- 1920: Buffalo All-Americans

Awards and highlights
- National champion (1915); Consensus All-American (1915)
- College Football Hall of Fame

Murray Norcross Shelton (April 20, 1893 – August 14, 1985) was an American football player.

Born in Dunkirk, New York, Shelton graduated from Cornell University in 1916 and was a member of the Sphinx Head Society. In 1973, he was elected to the College Football Hall of Fame. In 1984, he was also inducted into Chautauqua Sports Hall of Fame.

Shelton died on August 14, 1985, in Columbia, Missouri. He was 92.
