= Wally Hess =

American football player and coach (1894–1963)

Profile
- Positions: Fullback/Halfback, quarterback

Personal information
- Born: October 28, 1894; Hammond, Indiana, U.S.
- Died: August 30, 1963 (aged 68)

Career information
- College: Indiana

Career history

Playing
- 1920–1925: Hammond Pros

Coaching
- 1922–1924: Hammond Pros
- Coaching profile at Pro Football Reference

Walter Bernard Hess (October 28, 1894 – August 30, 1963) was a professional American football running back in the National Football League (NFL). He played six seasons for the Hammond Pros, with three of those seasons as a player-coach.
