= Leo Lyons (American football) =

American football player, coach, and executive (1892–1976)

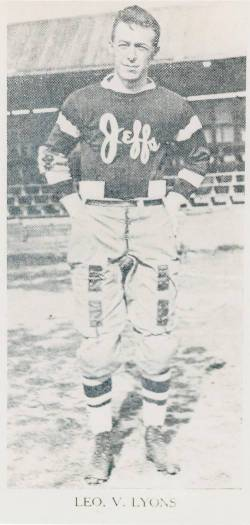
- Leo Lyons playing for the Rochester Jeffersons

Profile
- Positions: Owner, Head coach

Personal information
- Born: March 11, 1892; Fairport, New York, U.S.
- Died: May 18, 1976 (aged 84); Rochester, New York, U.S.

Career history

Playing
- Rochester Jeffersons (1908–1915)

Coaching
- Rochester Jeffersons (1910–1923); Rochester Jeffersons (1910–1918); Rochester Jeffersons (1923)

Operations
- Rochester Jeffersons (Owner) (1910–1925)

Awards and highlights
- New York Pro Football League Championship (1916); Co-founder of the National Football League

Career statistics
- NFL Win–loss record: 0-7-0
- Winning %: .000
- Games: 7
- Coaching profile at Pro Football Reference

Leo V. Lyons (March 11, 1892 – May 18, 1976) was a co-founder of the National Football League (NFL). He was a player, manager, coach and owner of the Rochester Jeffersons from 1908 to 1925.

== Early career ==
Lyons started out as a 16-year-old player, in 1908, for the Rochester Jeffersons semi-pro football team. By 1910, he was manager as well as a player of the team, who guided the Jeffersons to the Rochester city championship. As a manager, Leo recruited one of pro football's first African-American players, Henry McDonald.

== Manager and owner ==
Years later, Lyons became owner of the team. By the time the Jeffersons were an NFL team, he served the team as a manager, owner, photographer, doctor, counselor, financier, field worker, game booker, agent, and scout. He also was the manager of a basketball team, comprising his football players, to keep the team in shape. Lyons developed ambitions for the team. He took the Jeffersons to Canton, Ohio, early in the 1917 season to play the Canton Bulldogs, led by Jim Thorpe. Canton won the game easily, 41–0. However this led Lyons to study and adopt the Bulldogs way of recruiting and playing. In 1919, he brought in some outside players and the Jeffersons won the city semi-pro championship with ease, eventually finishing runner up in the state championship to their rivals in Buffalo.

== Forming the NFL ==
On September 17, 1920, Lyons represented Rochester at a meeting of the nation's leading pro football team managers held in Canton, for the purpose of creating the American Professional Football Association (later known as the National Football League in 1922). The Jeffersons were charter members of the organization and played in the league from 1920–25.

== Forfeit controversy ==
On December 5, 1921, a game was scheduled between the Jeffersons and the Washington Senators. Lyons refused to play the game. According to Lyons, the Senators had a poor fan turnout due to a snowstorm and said they would only pay the Jeffersons roughly $200. That amount would not allow for the team to be paid to play the game, or even meet its travel expenses for the trip back to Rochester. The game had an NFL guarantee that the Jeffersons must be paid $800 for the game regardless of anything. Lyons refused to play the game because of Washington not paying the $800 that was in the game contract. Later, NFL commissioner Joseph Carr ruled in favor of Lyons and the Jeffs. The Elias Sports Bureau has not recognized this game as a forfeit and official NFL standings also say it was not a forfeit.

== Demise of the Jeffs ==
By the early 1920s, Lyons had encountered a conundrum. Despite his investments, the Jeffersons were never able to consistently compete with other members of the league, but the team was far better than the semi-pro local squads that occupied the Rochester area. That meant that the Jeffersons' games were almost certain to be blowouts in one direction or the other, resulting in a boring product that Rochester residents were not willing to pay to see. After investing almost all of his personal wealth (including mortgaging his house) into the team, Lyons ran out of money in 1925 and was forced to suspend the team. The inactive team was left in limbo for the next two seasons before the NFL canceled Lyons's franchise at the 1928 owners' meetings.

Rochester would never again host an NFL franchise of its own; since 2000, the Buffalo Bills have taken up residence in the Rochester suburb of Pittsford at St. John Fisher College for its annual training camp.

== Honors ==
Lyons served as an Honorary Historian of the NFL from after the Jeffersons folded until his death, maintaining connections with some of the owners from his era, including George Halas. While not entirely flawless and often heavily weighted toward his own Jeffersons, his histories were considered better and more accurate than Harry March's earlier work on the topic, and Bob Carroll, founder of the Professional Football Researchers Association, noted that Lyons had "served well" in that capacity. He was a major advocate of, and contributor to, the Pro Football Hall of Fame; he himself was nominated several times but has never been inducted.
