= Doc Young =

American physician

Alva "Doc" Young
No. None
- Positions: Owner, Head coach

Personal information
- Born: December 18, 1881; Hamilton County, Indiana, U.S.
- Died: August 9, 1942 (aged 50); Chicago, Illinois, U.S.

Career information
- College: University of Indianapolis; New York University

Career history

Coaching
- 1925–1926: Hammond Pros

owner
- 1920–1926: Hammond Pros

Awards and highlights
- National Football League co-founder; Coaching record: 1–7
- Coaching profile at Pro Football Reference

Other information
- Military career
- Allegiance: United States
- Branch: U.S. Army
- Service years: 1917–1918
- Rank: First Lieutenant
- Unit: U.S. Army Medical Corps

Alvah (Alva) Andrew "Doc" Young (December 18, 1881 – August 9, 1942) was a founder of the National Football League (NFL). He was also the owner of NFL's Hammond Pros from 1920 until 1926. He was also a respected medical doctor and sports trainer.

== Early career ==
Young was born December 18, 1881, in Hamilton County, Indiana. He received his medical degree from Indiana University's Medical School in Indianapolis in 1905. He then established a general practice in Hammond, Indiana and married a woman from England, Lillian Fallowes Young. He also would assist the police, by serving as the leading authority on gunshot wounds. In 1915, he briefly left Hammond for New York City to take post graduate work at New York University. During World War I in 1917–1918, he served with the U.S. Army Medical Corps with the Depot Brigade at Camp Travis in San Antonio, Texas.

== Sports ==
Young played semi-pro baseball and was a lightweight wrestler in his youth. He also he promoted amateur and semi-pro boxing matches in Hammond. His greatest love was horse racing; Doc owned a stable of horses and spent several years making the circuit of the leading race tracks. He founded a company called A.A. Young Laboratories that developed a vitamin-calcium supplement for thoroughbreds called Min-O-Lac (Minerals of Milk).

Doc became a supporter of professional football in Indiana. He served as team doctor and trainer for the Hammond Clabby Athletic Club during the 1915–17 period. In 1919, promoter Paul Parduhn established the Hammond Pros for the purpose of competing against the Decatur Staleys and Canton Bulldogs. The team played its home games in Cub Park (now Wrigley Field), and one of its stars was George Halas. It is likely that Dr. Young was a part owner of the franchise.

In 1919 the Pros lost many of their high-priced players. Many of these players later appeared for the Chicago Tigers. This caused Young to field a new team, but one with fewer stars.

== Forming the NFL ==
On September 17, 1920, Dr. Young represented Hammond at a meeting of the nation's leading pro football team managers held in Canton, Ohio, for the purpose of creating the American Professional Football Association (later known as the National Football League in 1922). Dr. Young's Hammond Pros were charter members of the organization and played in the league from 1920 to 1926. They played three league opponents in 1920 and lost all three games by big scores.

In addition to games, Doc attended the league meetings. In Green Bay, Young got into an argument with Curly Lambeau over the kind of football the league would use. The Spalding J-5 was watermelon-shaped and perfect for drop kicks. However Lambeau wanted to use a thinner ball better-suited for passing, probably since he was the top passer of his day.

== Race and the NFL ==
In the 1940s, Fritz Pollard alleged that several of the NFL's owners attempted to raise the issue of a color barrier in pro football. According to Pollard, Young as well as Frank Nied and Art Ranney of the Akron Pros refused to allow the discussion to take place. They could not understand why a player could not be considered a player without his color being brought into account. Many outstanding black stars such as Pollard, Ink Williams, John Shelbourne, and Sol Butler appeared with the team during its years in the league.

== End of Pros ==
After Red Grange's American Football League (1926) folded, the NFL pushed most of its small town and traveling teams out of the league. This ended the Akron Indians, Canton Bulldogs, and Hammond. Indiana would not have another NFL team until the Indianapolis Colts would arrive from Baltimore in 1984. Meanwhile, Young continued to practice medicine on both people and horses. He died of pneumonia while working late, attending a sick horse in the summer of 1942. He is buried at Crownland Cemetery, Noblesville, Indiana.
