= Carol Hirschmugl =

- Education: Ph.D. applied physics, Yale University, 1994; B.Sc. physics, State University of New York at Stony Brook, 1987
- Known for: applications of infrared microspectroscopy to biological specimens and materials science
- Scientific career
- Fields: Physics
- Institutions: University of Wisconsin at Milwaukee

Carol Hirschmugl, is professor of physics at the University of Wisconsin at Milwaukee, principal investigator at the Synchrotron Radiation Center, and director of the Laboratory for Dynamics and Structure at Surfaces. She received her B.Sc. in physics from State University of New York at Stony Brook in 1987 and her applied physics PhD from Yale University in 1994. She has received an Alexander von Humboldt grant, a University of California President's Postdoctoral Fellowship, multiple National Science Foundation Grants, a Research Corporation Research Innovation Award, and a UWM Research Growth Initiative. She is notable for her research in applications of infrared microspectroscopy to biological specimens and materials science at the Lawrence Berkeley National Laboratory, Brookhaven National Laboratory, and the Synchrotron Radiation Center.

Results from her research have revealed a complex interplay between the electrons in a metallic substrate and the vibrations in molecules adsorbed on the surface. For example, Hirschmugl found that when certain vibrations of the adsorbate relax (decay), they create electronic excitations in the metal. Previously, it had been believed that these decaying vibrations would only create other vibrations.
