= Tam Rose =

American football player and coach (1888–1961)

Profile
- Position: Halfback

Personal information
- Born: December 5, 1888; Tonawanda, New York, U.S.
- Died: October 2, 1961 (aged 72); Tonawanda, New York, U.S.
- Listed height: 5 ft 11 in (1.80 m)
- Listed weight: 170 lb (77 kg)

Career information
- College: Syracuse

Career history
- Tonawanda Kardex (1916–1921)
- Coaching profile at Pro Football Reference
- Stats at Pro Football Reference

Walter Sumner "Tam" Rose (December 5, 1888 – October 2, 1961) was an American football player at Syracuse University and then a player and coach with the Tonawanda Kardex, including during the team's brief stint in the National Football League (NFL) He played halfback and served as the team's head coach from its founding in 1916. The team played only one game in the NFL before folding in 1921.

Rose was a captain of the 1915 Syracuse Orangemen football team and was twice selected to Walter Camp's All-American team. He was the leading point scorer for Syracuse.
