= Barney Lepper =

American football player and manager (1898–1985)

Profile
- Positions: Tackle, halfback, quarterback

Personal information
- Born: February 19, 1898; Buffalo, New York, U.S.
- Died: December 1, 1985 (aged 87); Miami, Florida, U.S.
- Listed height: 5 ft 10 in (1.78 m)
- Listed weight: 185 lb (84 kg)

Career information
- High school: Lafayette (Buffalo, New York)

Career history
- Buffalo All-Stars/Niagaras/Prospects/All-Americans (1917–1920)
- Stats at Pro Football Reference

Howard Emmett "Barney" Lepper (February 19, 1898 – December 1, 1985) was a professional football player, as well as the manager, for the Buffalo All-Americans. Aside from playing football in Buffalo, Lepper also helped start the team in 1917, when they were called the Buffalo All-Stars, Niagaras and Prospects. All of the early press announcements regarding the Buffalo team, referred to Lepper as the team's manager. Around 1917, Lepper and Frank McNeil signed a lease for the team to play their home games at Canisius College.

In 1920 the Buffalo All-Americans started their season 7–0. this gave Lepper the best start for a rookie head coach in NFL history. His record was kept intact until 1931, when Potsy Clark of the Portsmouth Spartans broke the record with an 8–0 start. However. Barney kept his second-best start stat until November 1, 2009, when rookie coach Jim Caldwell of the Indianapolis Colts tied his record. A week later Caldwell tied Clark's record, giving Lepper now the third-best start by a rookie coach in the NFL.

Prior to his professional career, Lepper played football at the high school level for Lafayette High School. There he starred at tackle and placekicker, leading the team to consecutive city championships in 1914 and 1915.

== Head coaching record ==
Team	Year	Regular season					Postseason			
Team	Year	Won	Lost	Ties	Win %	Finish	Won	Lost	Win %	Result
BUF	1917	4	6	2	.417	–	–	–	–	–
BUF Total		4	6	2	.417		–	–	–	–
Total		4	6	2	.417		–	–	–	–
