= Tonawanda Kardex Lumbermen =

Defunct American football team

Tonawanda Lumbermen (Tonawanda Kardex)

General information
- Founded: 1913
- Folded: 1921
- Stadium: Tonawanda High School (1916–1920); Traveling Team (1921)
- Headquartered: City of Tonawanda, New York, United States
- Colors: Navy, silver

Personnel
- Head coach: Walter "Tam" Rose

Nickname
- the "Jacks"

Team history
- All-Tonawanda All-Stars (1916–1917); All-Tonawanda Lumberjacks (1918–1919); Tonawanda Lumbermen (1920); Tonawanda Lumbermen/Kardex (1921)

League / conference affiliations
- New York Pro Football League (1916–1919); Independent (1920); American Professional Football Association (1921)

The Tonawanda Kardex (also known as the Tonawanda Lumbermen and during its first season, the All-Tonawanda Lumberjacks) was an American football team active between 1916 and 1921. It played its games in Tonawanda, New York, a suburb of Buffalo with close ties to North Tonawanda, New York where American Kardex was founded. The team is most notable for its one game as a member of the American Professional Football Association (now the National Football League) in the 1921 season. They are easily the shortest-lived team in the league's history, and the shortest-lived known team in North American major league sports history.

== Early history ==
Professional football was being played in Tonawanda by no later than 1913 (this terminus ad quem comes from records that show the team lost to the Lancaster Malleables in the region's showcase Thanksgiving game that year). They played their home games on the Tonawanda High School field, sometimes drawing up to 3,500 fans for a game. For the team's entire history, it was coached by Syracuse standout Walter "Tam" Rose. In 1917, it defeated the Rochester Jeffersons for the state championship. In 1919, it made the state playoffs but lost in the semifinals to the Buffalo Prospects, who went on to win the title.

The 1920 All Tonawanda Lumberjacks were a very successful team, garnering a record of 7–1 against two local American Professional Football Association (the predecessor to the NFL) franchises and other independent teams, only allowing more than 6 points in one of their contests (the one loss, a 35–0 decision to Buffalo). Their last game of the season against the Rochester Jeffersons was among the first games in the traditional Thanksgiving Day series.

== Tonawanda in the APFA ==
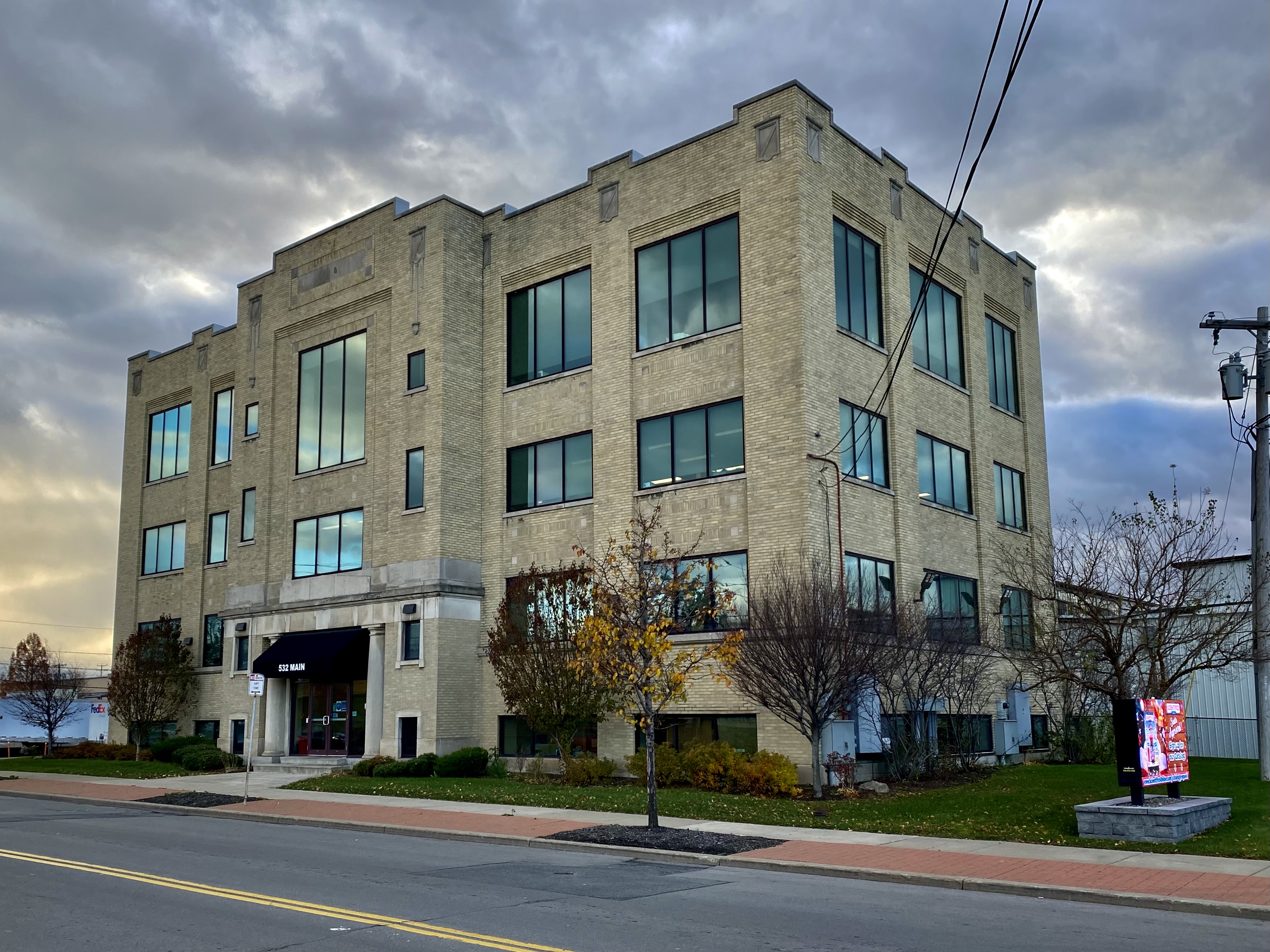
The former headquarters of the American Kardex Company, the team's namesake and sponsor

With their 1920 success (and a crackdown by the APFA on playing non-league teams), the Lumberjacks joined the league in 1921 as the Tonawanda Lumbermen or Tonawanda Kardex, named for (and presumably sponsored by) James Rand Jr.'s American Kardex, a company that through mergers and acquisitions became part of Rand Kardex, Remington Rand, Sperry Rand, and eventually UniSys.

Before 1921, the team played its home games at Tonawanda High School; however, its lone game in the NFL was an away game, and according to contemporary news reports, the team had intended to play as a traveling team had it continued beyond one game. NFL records list the nonexistent and spurious "Lumbermen Stadium" as the team's home field.

The 1921 season began much like the first, with a scoreless tie against the Syracuse Pros, followed by a 9–7 win against the Cleveland Panthers. A game against the Rochester Scalpers scheduled for November was canceled; instead, on November 6, 1921, the Kardex traveled to Rochester to play their sole APFA league game, against the Rochester Jeffersons. There they played the worst game of their existence, a 45–0 blowout loss to the Jeffs in front of 2,700 fans.

Several factors played into the Lumbermen's departure from the league. Records from the Pro Football Researchers Association indicate that Tonawanda had trouble scheduling games due to a lack of willing opponents. The now-renamed NFL's franchise fee for 1922 also increased from $50 to $1,000, making it harder for Tonawanda to play a second season in the league. The team's declining on-field performance was also a factor (Rochester and Syracuse were two teams that Tonawanda had beaten handily as an independent in 1920 but performed far less well against as a league member in 1921).

Whether or not the team continued to exist is somewhat unclear. Records from 1925 show that the Buffalo Football Bisons played an exhibition game against a team from Tonawanda before the 1925 regular season, but it is not known if it is the same Tonawanda team as the APFA/NYPFL franchise.

The "Lumberjacks" name is currently in use by North Tonawanda High School.

=== Team roster ===
Due to incomplete record-keeping during this time, some players from the 1921 team are only reported upon by their last name.

Backnor, C; Fred Brumm, LT; Cassidy, QB; Joe Dussosoit, RE; Andy Fletcher, LHB; Art Georke, LE; Clarence Hosmer, LG; Rudy Kraft, LG-C; George Kuhrt, LT; Buck MacDonald, RG; Tom McLaughlin, RHB-FB; Bill Meisner, RHB; Frank Morrisey, RT; Frank Primeau, RE-QB; Tam Rose, LHB; Spin Roy, LE; Bill Sanborn, RE; Charles Tallman, RT; Red Werder, C; Wex, FB;Wise, QB
