= Tommy Hughitt =

American-Canadian football player and coach (1892–1961)

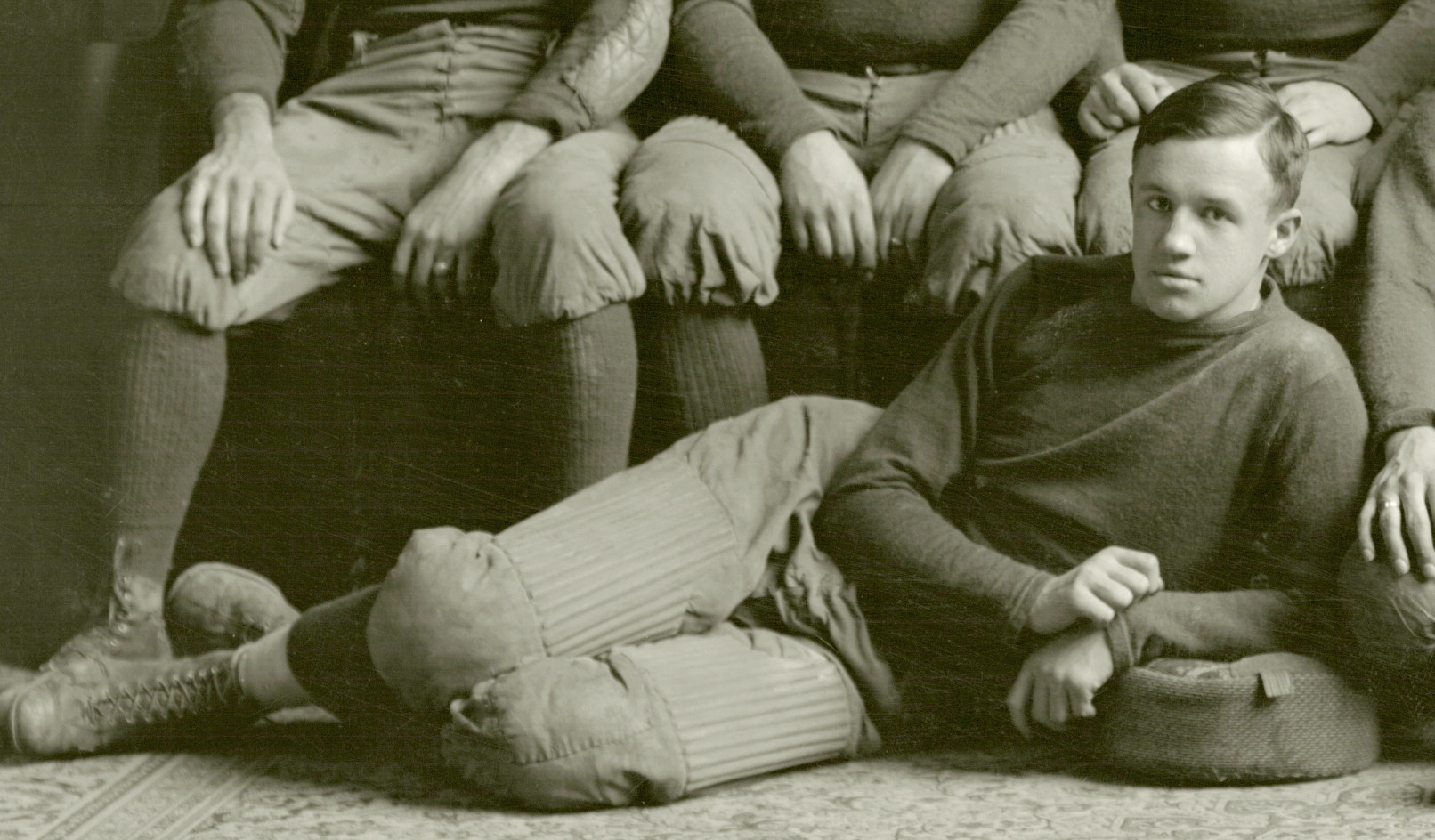

No. 1
- Positions: Back, Punter, Kicker

Personal information
- Born: December 27, 1892; Genoa, British Columbia, Canada
- Died: December 27, 1961 (aged 69); Bartow, Florida, U.S.
- Listed height: 5 ft 8 in (1.73 m)
- Listed weight: 159 lb (72 kg)

Career information
- High school: Escanaba (MI)
- College: Michigan

Career history

Playing
- Youngstown Patricians (1917–1919); Buffalo Niagaras (1918); Buffalo Prospects (1919); Buffalo All-Americans (1920–1923); Buffalo Bisons (1924)

Coaching
- Maine (1915–1916); Buffalo Niagaras (1918); Buffalo Prospects (1919); Buffalo All-Americans (1920–1923); Buffalo Bisons (1924)

Awards and highlights
- First-team All-Pro (1922); First-team All-American (1913)

Head coaching record
- Regular season: NFL: 34–15–7 (.670); NCAA: 6–7–3 (.469)
- Coaching profile at Pro Football Reference
- Stats at Pro Football Reference

Tommy Hughitt (born Ernest Fredrick Hughitt; December 27, 1892 – December 27, 1961) was a Canadian-American professional football player, coach, referee, and politician. He played college football as a quarterback for the Michigan Wolverines, earning All-American honors. He was a utility player in the National Football League (NFL).

== Early life ==
Hughitt was born in Genoa, British Columbia, but grew up in Escanaba, Michigan; his father, Orrin Hughitt, owned the hardware store in Escanaba. His high school football career in Escanaba was undistinguished, and Hughitt saw little playing time on his high school squad. Upon graduation he went to the University of Michigan, where he played halfback and then quarterback for the Wolverines.

== Coaching career ==
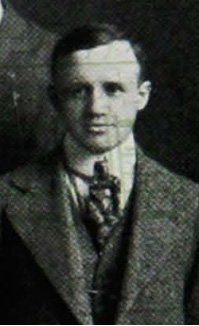
Hughitt at Maine, 1917

From 1915 to 1916, Hughitt was the head football coach at the University of Maine. He compiled a 6–7–3 overall record, including the Maine Intercollegiate Athletic Association championship in 1915. An article in The Michigan Technic commented on Hughitt's success at Maine:

Due to the excellent coaching of 'Tommy' Hughitt, former varsity quarterback, the University of Maine football team won the state championship this season. Hughitt showed the effectiveness of the Yost system of coaching by developing a bunch of green material, a team which staged a real 'comeback' after a bad start last year. Maine is highly pleased with the work of Hughitt and has engaged him for this season.

After experiencing a winless season in 1916, Hughitt left his coaching position in Maine and signed with the Youngstown Patricians of the Ohio League, turning professional as a player-coach. When the Patricians ceased operations due to the war and flu problems of 1918, Hughitt moved on to Buffalo Niagaras and Prospects of the Buffalo Semi-Pro Football League, returning to Youngstown in a brief and abortive attempt to relaunch the Patricians in 1919.

When the Prospects joined the ranks of the APFA (later known as the National Football League) in 1920, Hughitt was retained as the centerpiece of the now-renamed Buffalo All-Americans. During his APFA/NFL career, Hughitt was a triple threat man and player-coach at the same time, playing quarterback, wide receiver, running back, punter, placekicker, and playing on defense all the while coaching the team. He finished his career with an impressive 34–15–7 record, two state championships (1918 and 1919), two top-three finishes in the NFL (1920 and 1921), and statistically finishing at or near the top of the league in several scoring and receiving categories in 1920 and 1921 (the one-two punch of Hughitt and Ockie Anderson was one of the most potent in the nascent league); he never had a losing season in his entire time as a professional coach.

== After football ==
He retired from football in 1924, shortly after acquiring a stake in his team. After Hughitt's departure, he handed over the reins of the franchise to Walter Koppisch, and Hughitt spent time as an official with the NFL and All-America Football Conference, during which he earned much respect. Buffalo sports historian Jeffrey J. Miller credits Hughitt for helping reintegrate black players in professional American football by strictly enforcing unsportsmanlike conduct penalties for fouls against black players that were clearly motivated by racism, during his time as a referee in the AAFC; Miller cites statements from Marion Motley, who played games that Hughitt had officiated, in support of this.

After his time in the NFL, Hughitt remained in the City of Buffalo and legally changed his name to "Tommy" for the purpose of making his name recognizable as he entered politics. In 1937, he served for a term of four years on the Buffalo Common Council, and at one point he unsuccessfully ran for the sheriff of Erie County. In the private sector, Hughitt ran a Ford dealership in the Buffalo area for many years. He died while on vacation in Bartow, Florida and was buried at Forest Lawn in Buffalo. He was elected to Michigan's Upper Peninsula Sports Hall of Fame in 1992. However, despite his record, Hughitt has never been considered for the Pro Football Hall of Fame. He had a .694 winning percentage as a head coach, which ranks as the sixth highest for an NFL coach (he is second among coaches not inducted, next to Jim Harbaugh). In 2022, he was named one of the 10 inaugural members for the Football Learning Academy's Hall of Honor, which looks to acknowledge deserving icons that are not currently inducted in the hall. Part of his overlooking came from the fact that the Hall of Fame had excluded persons with officiating experience until Art McNally was inducted in 2021.

Hughitt wore the number 1.

== Head coaching record ==
=== College ===
Year	Team	Overall	Conference	Standing	Bowl/playoffs
Maine Black Bears (Maine Intercollegiate Athletic Association) (1915–1916)
1915	Maine	6–3	3–0	1st	
1916	Maine	0–4–3	0–1–2		
Total:		6–7–3			
National championship Conference title Conference division title or championship game berth

=== Professional ===
Team	Year	Regular season					Postseason			
Team	Year	Won	Lost	Ties	Win %	Finish	Won	Lost	Win %	Result
BUF	1918	5	0	0	1.000	–	–	–	–	–
BUF	1920	9	1	1	.864	3rd in APFA	–	–	–	–
BUF	1921	9	1	2	.833	2nd in APFA	–	–	–	–
BUF	1922	5	4	1	.550	9th in NFL	–	–	–	–
BUF	1923	5	4	3	.542	8th in NFL	–	–	–	–
BUF	1924	6	5	0	.545	9th in NFL	–	–	–	–
BUF Total		39	15	7	.697		–	–	–	–
NFL Total		34	15	7	.670		–	–	–	–
Total		39	15	7	.697		–	–	–	–

== See also ==
- 1913 College Football All-America Team
- List of Michigan Wolverines football All-Americans
