= Hank Gillo =

American football player and coach (1894–1948)

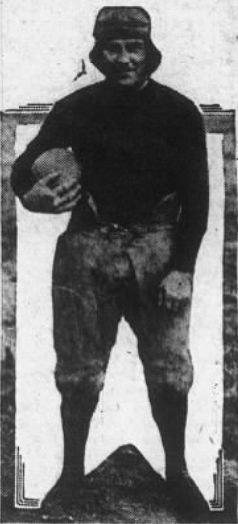

Personal information
- Born: October 5, 1894; Milwaukee, Wisconsin, U.S.
- Died: September 6, 1948 (aged 53); Milwaukee, Wisconsin, U.S.
- Listed height: 5 ft 10 in (1.78 m)
- Listed weight: 195 lb (88 kg)

Career information
- College: Colgate

Career history

Playing
- 1920–1921: Hammond Pros
- 1922–1924: Racine Legion
- 1925: Milwaukee Badgers
- 1926: Racine Tornadoes

Coaching
- 1920: Hammond Pros

Awards and highlights
- Collyer's First-team All-Pro (1923); Third-team All-American (1919)
- Coaching profile at Pro Football Reference

Other information
- Military career
- Allegiance: United States
- Branch: U.S. Army
- Service years: 1918-1919
- Conflicts: World War I

Henry Charles Gillo (October 5, 1894 – September 6, 1948) was an American professional football player in the National Football League (NFL) for the Hammond Pros, Racine Legion, and Milwaukee Badgers from 1920 to 1926. In 1920, Gillo also served as head coach of the Pros. He played college football for the Colgate Raiders. His style of play earned him the nickname Hank 'Line Plunging' Gillo.

== Biography ==
Gillo as organizer of the Racine Legion football team in 1921.

Hank Gillo was born Henry Charles Gillo on October 5, 1894, in Milwaukee, Wisconsin. Gillo played at Colgate University from 1915 to 1917, and 1919. He was voted captain for the 1918 team but was serving in France in World War I (there was no football at Colgate in 1918).

Gillo was the organizer, coach, and star of a professional football team organized in Racine, Wisconsin by the post of the American Legion There. The Racine Legion team would become a member of the National Football League in 1922 and would remain part of organization — despite significant financial losses — through the 1924 season. As a member of the Horlick-Legion team, Gillo led the NFL in scoring in 1922 with 52 points.

In 1923 he was a Collyer's First-team All-Pro. He held the NFL record for longest field goal with a 55, 56, or 57 yard kick against the Packers in 1922. When he returned to Milwaukee he married Eva Shead, his high school girlfriend. He spent 21 years as a teacher in a prep school in Milwaukee and was the head of the biology department at the time of his death. Gillo died of a heart attack on September 6, 1948.
