= Max Hicks (American football) =

American football player and coach (1892–1944)

Profile
- Position: End

Personal information
- Born: November 6, 1892
- Died: November 12, 1944 (aged 52)
- Listed weight: 175 lb (79 kg)

Career information
- College: Geneva

Career history

Playing
- 1920–1921: Hammond Pros

Coaching
- 1921: Hammond Pros
- Coaching profile at Pro Football Reference

Edward Francis "Max" Hicks (November 6, 1892 – November 12, 1944) was an American professional football player and coach in the early National Football League (NFL)–then called the American Professional Football Association (AFPA). He played in 1920 for the Hammond Pros and later served the team as a player-coach in 1921.
