= New York Pro Football League =

Precursor to NFL

The New York Pro Football League (NYPFL) was a professional American football league, active in the 1910s, and based in upstate New York, primarily Western New York. Between 1920 and 1921, the league's best teams were absorbed into the National Football League, though none survive in that league. It was one of the biggest challengers to the Ohio League in professional football in the 1910s.

Its formation was highly informal. The teams were largely clustered around the two cities of Rochester and Buffalo, with rural teams to fill the differences. Rochester had built its reputation around a strong "sandlot football" circuit, for instance, and was most popular when it consisted mostly of local teams. Rochester's best team, the Jeffersons, was instrumental in bringing the NYPFL and the Ohio League together to form the American Professional Football Association. The circuit continued to exist even after the birth of the APFA (with the NYPFL teams continuing to play in both circuits), with the league finally dwindling away in the late 1920s and early 1930s. One NYPFL team, the Watertown Red & Black, still survives.

== Known champions ==
The NYPFL's championship games were mostly held in Buffalo, New York, either at the International Fair Association Grounds or at Buffalo Baseball Park. The games were generally held on Thanksgiving.

- 1908: Buffalo Oakdales 7–2–2
- 1909: Buffalo Oakdales 5–1–0
- 1910: Buffalo Cazenovias 9–1–1 [The Cazenovias outscored their opponents 192-0 in the 10 game season, tying with the previous year's champion Oakdales 0-0 for a season record of 9-0-1. "The Cazenovias and Oakdales played a post-season game, November 27th. A dispute arose in the second half, with only seven minutes to play, which could not be amicably settled and the referee forfeited the game to the Oakdales, 1 to 0.” ]
- 1911: Buffalo Cazenovias 6–0–1
- 1912: records incomplete
- 1913: Lancaster 8–0–1
- 1914: All-Lancaster 6–0–1
- 1915: Rochester Jeffersons 3–1–3 (records incomplete)
- 1916: Rochester Jeffersons
- 1917: All-Tonawanda, def. Rochester Jeffersons 9–7
- 1918: Buffalo Niagaras.
  - Due to war and flu concerns in 1918, Buffalo played a six-game schedule (all wins) only in its own city. The Jeffersons continued operating, including a game against the Detroit Heralds and one game against a local squad, but never challenged Buffalo to a title match.
- 1919: See below

== 1919 playoffs ==
The NYPFL is believed to have been the first professional football league to use a playoff format (as opposed to a single-game championship) in 1919.

The Buffalo Semi-Pro, Rochester, and Central New York divisions were known to have championships. In the Buffalo division, the Buffalo Prospects defeated the Tonawanda Lumberjacks by a score of 12-7. In Central New York, All-Syracuse defeated the Watertown Red & Black and advanced to face Buffalo the next week. Buffalo defeated Syracuse 23-0. The Rochester Jeffersons won the Rochester circuit title.

This led to the two-game "New York Pro Championship" between the Buffalo and Rochester divisions over Thanksgiving weekend in 1919, with the Buffalo Prospects defeating the Rochester Jeffersons by a score of 20-0 in the second of two games (the first, held on Thanksgiving Day, was a scoreless tie, necessitating a rematch).

Playoffs and championships were abandoned after the 1919 season once the NFL formed.

== Role in the NFL's founding ==
Both Buffalo and Rochester had significant ties to the teams in the Ohio League, stemming back to 1917, when both teams went barnstorming in Ohio. The Jeffersons were able to land a game against the top team in the nation, the Canton Bulldogs, where Jeffersons owner Leo Lyons suggested to Bulldogs coach Jim Thorpe and owner Ralph Hay that a league format could eventually become as popular as Major League Baseball.

Buffalo, too, had connections to the Ohio League. In addition to a team of "Buffalo All-Stars" barnstorming in 1917 against the Detroit Heralds and Massillon Tigers, Buffalo quarterback Tommy Hughitt had moonlighted as a member of the Ohio League's Youngstown Patricians.

When the Ohio League owners moved to make a national league in 1920, Buffalo and Rochester, being familiar to the league owners, were invited to join, and both accepted.

== Teams ==
=== Buffalo Semi Pro Football League ===
- Buffalo Niagaras/Prospects. Two teams led by utility player Tommy Hughitt; Hughitt's teams were the best in the league. Joined the NFL in 1920 as the Buffalo All-Americans, where it played until 1927, and was revived for one last season in 1929. Successor to the Buffalo All-Stars, who played from 1915 to 1917.
- All-Tonawanda Lumberjacks. An all-star team of players from Tonawanda, New York; known to have formed in 1916 and coached for its entire existence by Tam Rose. Joined the NFL in 1921 as the Tonawanda Lumbermen, or, under its sponsored name, as Tonawanda Kardex (after title sponsor Rand Kardex), but folded after one game in the league.
- Buffalo Pierce-Arrows. Team sponsored by the Pierce-Arrow automobile manufacturer.
- Buffalo Oakdales. Said to be an early dominant team in Buffalo semiprofessional football, but had fallen by the wayside by 1912 and folded around 1915.
- All-Buffalo. An all-star team from Buffalo that existed in some form until at least 1921.
- West Buffalo. Existed until at least 1920.
- Tonawanda Frontiers. Another Tonawanda-based team, the Frontiers existed from the late 1910s through at least 1925.
- Lancaster Malleables Based in Lancaster, New York. Won the league championship in 1913 and 1914.
- Fort Porter 74th Infantry Division. A team based at Fort Porter from the time of its reactivation in 1917 to at least 1920.

=== Rochester sandlot circuit ===
- Rochester Jeffersons. Based in Rochester, New York; they were the best team among a number of other Rochester-based teams. Joined the NFL in 1920, and played until 1925.
- Rochester Scalpers. One of many Rochester-based teams; existed until at least 1920.
- Rochester Oxfords. Another of many Rochester-based teams, and one of the better ones; it peaked in 1922 under the leadership of Romey Farrell. It existed until at least 1926, in its latter years, solely as a semiprofessional team.
- Dutchtown Russers. Team backed by local wrestler Max Russer.
- 19th Ward Regals. Operated by Leo Powers, founded 1920, ended 1921.

=== Central New York division ===
- All-Syracuse. Based in Syracuse, New York. Traces its history to the Syracuse Athletic Club, which was founded in 1890. May have joined the NFL in 1921, though there is significant doubt regarding this.
- Watertown Red and Blacks. Based in Watertown, New York. The team never joined the NFL, but is the only one still in operation today; it is known today as the Watertown Red & Black and operates as a semiprofessional member of the Empire Football League.
- All Fulton and Oswego. Based in Oswego County, New York. Appears most frequently in historical records as a regional rival to the Red & Black.

=== Unaffiliated ===
- Jamestown Alcos. Based in Jamestown, New York.
- Geneva Glenwoods. Based in Geneva, New York; oddly, this team had a home field that had no goal posts, which meant that no field goals could be attempted.
- Endicott-Johnson Athletic Association. Based in Binghamton, New York; existed until at least 1921.
- LeRoy. Unnamed team from LeRoy, New York.
- Kanaweola Athletic Club (some spellings have Ranaweola). Based in Elmira, New York. Known to have existed in 1902, since they hosted the first ever night game in professional football, against the Philadelphia Athletics. Kanaweola lost the game, 39-0. Status unknown afterward.

== See also ==
- History of the National Football League
