= Hammond Pros =

Defunct American football team

General information
- Founded: 1917
- Folded: 1926
- Stadium: Cubs Park
- Headquartered: Hammond, Indiana, U.S.
- Colors: Purple, gold, white

Personnel
- Owners: Paul Parduhn; Doc Young
- Head coach: Hank Gillo (1920); Max Hicks (1921); Wally Hess (1922–1924); Fritz Pollard (1925); Doc Young (1925)

Team history
- Hammond Pros (1920–1926)

League / conference affiliations
- National Football League

The Hammond Pros were an American football team from Hammond, Indiana, that played in the National Football League from 1920 to 1926 as a traveling team.

== History ==
The Pros were established by local businessman Paul Parduhn and Dr. Alva Young. Young, a boxing promoter and owner of a racing stable, also served as doctor/trainer (and part-owner) for a semi-pro football team operated by the Hammond Clabby Athletic Association from 1915 to 1917. In 1918, Young presided over a new team known as the "Hammond All-Stars" and played against many of the teams that would form the backbone of the American Professional Football Association (including the Racine Cardinals, Detroit Heralds, Rock Island Independents, Minneapolis Marines, Cleveland Tigers, Canton Bulldogs, and Toledo Maroons); Young attended the historic meeting in Canton, Ohio at which the APFA was formed in 1920. (It is said that a game between Hammond and Canton, played Thanksgiving Day 1919 and drawing some 12,000 spectators in Chicago, convinced team owners that a league would be viable.)

In 1919, the Hammond Bobcats starred George Halas at wide receiver; Halas left for the Decatur Staleys – the future Chicago Bears – the following year, remaining with that franchise as a player, coach, and owner until his death in 1983. Contemporary reports identified this high-spending "$20,000 team" as a separate entity from Young's Hammond Pros, in that the team played all its home games in Chicago; that team was eventually admitted as the Chicago Tigers.

Despite the name, the Pros were little more than a semi-professional outfit; most of the players were locals who had full-time jobs and couldn't practice much, and thus were simply no match for most other NFL squads. Nor did they really represent Hammond, as the town's stadium (A. Murray Turner Field) was built for baseball and seated only a few thousand. The Pros would play only two regular-season NFL games in Hammond over their seven years in the league, and would use Cubs Park in Chicago as an unofficial "home" stadium. Nevertheless, Young kept the team going in the NFL for seven years and 34 games, with a combined record of 5–26–4. The Pros might have lasted even longer, but after winning the 1926 battle with the American Football League, the NFL decided to scale down to 12 teams, getting rid of many of the smaller franchises, including the Pros.

Of the nine African-American players in the league during those years, six played for the Pros, including the first African-American head coach in the NFL, Fritz Pollard, and the successful music producer Mayo "Ink" Williams.

== Hall of Famers ==
Hammond Pros Hall of Famers
No.	Name	Position	Tenure	Inducted
—	Paddy Driscoll	QB/HB	1919	1965
—	George Halas	End	1919	1963
—	Fritz Pollard	HB; Coach	1923, 1925	2005

== Season-by-season ==
Season records for the Hammond Pros
Year	W	L	T	Finish	Coach
1920	2	5	0	12th	Hank Gillo
1921	1	3	1	13th	Max Hicks
1922	0	5	1	15th	Wally Hess
1923	1	5	1	15th	Wally Hess
1924	2	2	1	10th	Wally Hess
1925	1	4	0	14th	Fritz Pollard, Doc Young
1926	0	4	0	21st	Doc Young
