= Rochester Jeffersons =

Football team in Rochester, New York, United States

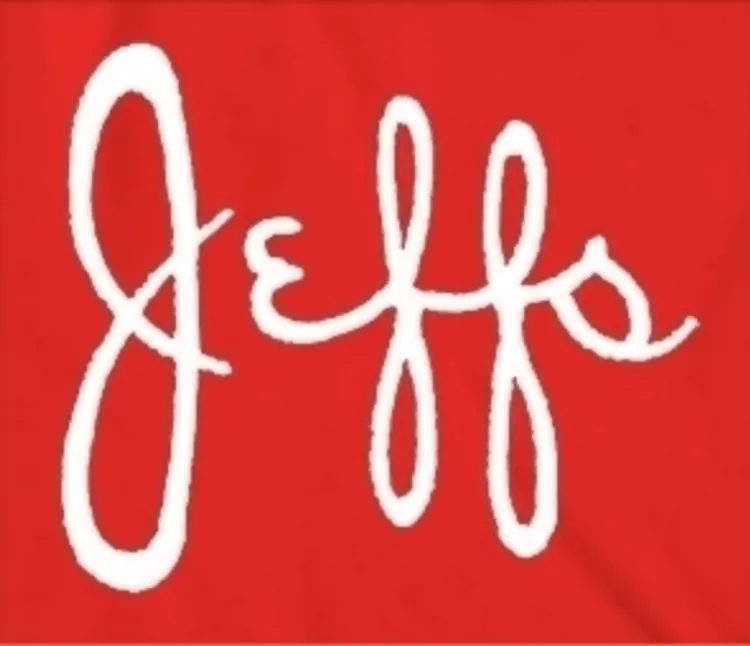
Logo

General information
- Founded: 1898
- Folded: 1928
- Stadium: Sheehan’s Field (1908, 1912–1913, 1915); West End Park (1909); Baseball Park (Rochester) (1914, 1920–1922); Edgerton Park (1923–1924); Traveling team (1924-1925)
- Headquartered: Rochester, New York, U.S.
- Colors: Red, white

Personnel
- Owners: William Glavin (1908); Frank Dunning (1909); Leo Lyons (1910–1925); Eddie Schlegel (1926-1928)
- General manager: William Glavin (1908); Frank Dunning (1909); Leo Lyons (1910–1925)
- Head coach: Jack Forsyth (1919–1921); Joe Alexander (1922); Leo Lyons (1923); Jerry Noonan (1924); Tex Grigg (1925)

Nickname
- the "Jeffs"

Team history
- Rochester Jeffersons (1898–1925)

League / conference affiliations
- New York Pro Football League (1908–1919); National Football League (1920–1925)

The Rochester Jeffersons were an American football team based in Rochester, New York, from 1898 to 1925. The team was a founding member of the National Football League (NFL), in which they played from 1920 to 1925.

== History ==
Formed as an amateur outfit by a rag-tag group of Rochester-area teenagers after the turn of the 20th century (a 1925 report has the team being founded in 1898), the team became known as the Jeffersons in reference to the locale of their playing field on Jefferson Avenue. Around 1908 a teenager by the name of Leo Lyons joined with the club as a player, and within two years began to manage, finance, and promote the team on a full-time basis.

For their first decade of their existence, the "Jeffs" played other amateur and semi-pro teams from the upstate New York area such as the Rochester Scalpers and the Oxfords. From 1914 to 1917, the team grew stronger with opponents from Buffalo and Syracuse. In 1916, they were the New York State champions. By 1917, the Jeffs had started to look past state borders not only for big-name opponents, but for big-name talent as well.

At the end of October 1917, Lyons managed to secure a match against the country's greatest team, the Canton Bulldogs, who had the legendary Jim Thorpe as their star attraction. Thorpe's squad crushed the Jeffs 41–0, but the audacity of challenging such a superior team to a match won Lyons and his club a bit of notoriety. In 1920, Leo Lyons was at the Hupmobile showroom in Canton, Ohio to become an original member of the newly formed American Professional Football Association, which two years later would be known as the National Football League. The NFL recognizes that 1920 meeting as the founding of the National Football League.

As it turned out, Rochester was more interested in its thriving sandlot football circuit than in professional football. The Jeffersons had attempted to recruit some of the country's best college players, but the fans would rather see local boys play, and, by 1922, the Jeffersons' on-field product was enough to annihilate local teams (thus discouraging fans from coming out, as blowouts were assured) but, after some initial modest success, not good enough to compete with the rest of the NFL (thus also discouraging fans from coming out, as the Jeffersons were almost assured to lose).

As a result, the team's attendance suffered badly, with the local semi-pro teams drawing much better. Without a consistent draw at the gate, the team's finances, play on the field and ability to draw star talent likewise suffered, and the team finished its last four seasons without a single league win. (This was not to say that the team went totally winless in this span; in a 1924 contest, the Jeffersons defeated the Pottsville Maroons of the Anthracite League; the Maroons, the class of their league, moved to the NFL in 1925, when it contended for the NFL title.)

In 1920, John Barsha played for the team. From 1921 to 1924, two-time First Team All Pro Doc Alexander played for the team. After an unsuccessful last-ditch effort to lure Red Grange to Rochester (he instead signed with the Chicago Bears), the team suspended operations after the 1925 NFL season; by this point, the team had been losing money (to the point where Lyons' house had been foreclosed upon because of his dumping of virtually all his assets into the team) and had been a traveling team for two seasons (1924 and 1925).

The team remained technically suspended for 1926 and 1927, but allowed its franchise to expire in 1928. Lyons stayed on with the NFL as an unofficial historian after the Jeffersons' folding. Rochester would never again host an NFL franchise of its own; since 2000, the Buffalo Bills have taken up residence in the Rochester suburb of Pittsford at St. John Fisher College for its annual training camp.

== Notable players ==
- John Barsha (born Abraham Barshofsky; 1898–1976)
- Hal Clark, 1920–1925 editions
- Bill Kellogg, member of the 1925 team
- Elmer Oliphant, 1920 edition of the team

== Season records ==
Season	Team	League	Regular season				Post-season results	Coach
Season	Team	League	Finish	W	L	T	Post-season results	Coach
Rochester Jeffersons
1908	1908	NYPFL	—	3	1	0	No playoffs	
1909	1909	NYPFL	—	1	0	1	No playoffs	
1910	1910	NYPFL	—	1	0	3	No playoffs	
1911	1911	NYPFL	—	0	1	3	No playoffs	Joe Still
1912	1912	NYPFL	—	4	1	1	No playoffs	
1913	1913	NYPFL	—	4	1	1	No playoffs	
1914	1914	NYPFL	—	2	1	1	No playoffs	Harry Irwin, H. Acton Langslow
1915	1915	NYPFL	—	3	1	3	No playoffs	
1916	1916	NYPFL	CHAMPIONS	3	1	3	No playoffs	
1917	1917	NYPFL	—	4	3	1	No playoffs	Harry Irwin
1918	1918	NYPFL	—	2	0	0	No playoffs	
1919	1919	NYPFL	—	6	2	1	Lost to Buffalo Prospects	Jack Forsyth
1920	1920	APFA	7th	6	3	2	No playoffs	Jack Forsyth
1921	1921	APFA	10th	2	3	0	No playoffs	Jack Forsyth
1922	1922	NFL	17th	0	4	1	No playoffs	Doc Alexander
1923	1923	NFL	20th	0	4	0	No playoffs	Leo Lyons
1924	1924	NFL	18th	0	7	0	No playoffs	Jerry Noonan
1925	1925	NFL	17th	0	6	1	No playoffs	Tex Grigg
