= Big Train (disambiguation) =

Big Train is a British television comedy series.

Big Train or The Big Train may also refer to:

== People ==
- Carl Willis, American baseball player
- Walter Johnson (1887–1946), American baseball player
- Lionel Conacher (1900–1954), Canadian sportsman and politician
- John "Big Train" Moody (1917–1995), American football player

== Music ==
- "Big Train", a single from Mike Watt's first solo album Ball-Hog or Tugboat?
- "Big Train", a track from David Lee Roth's album Your Filthy Little Mouth

== See also ==
- Bethesda Big Train, an American amateur minor league baseball team
- Big Big Train, British progressive rock group
