= Spaghetti Bowl (American football) =

1945 American football game between military teams in Italy

1945 Spaghetti Bowl
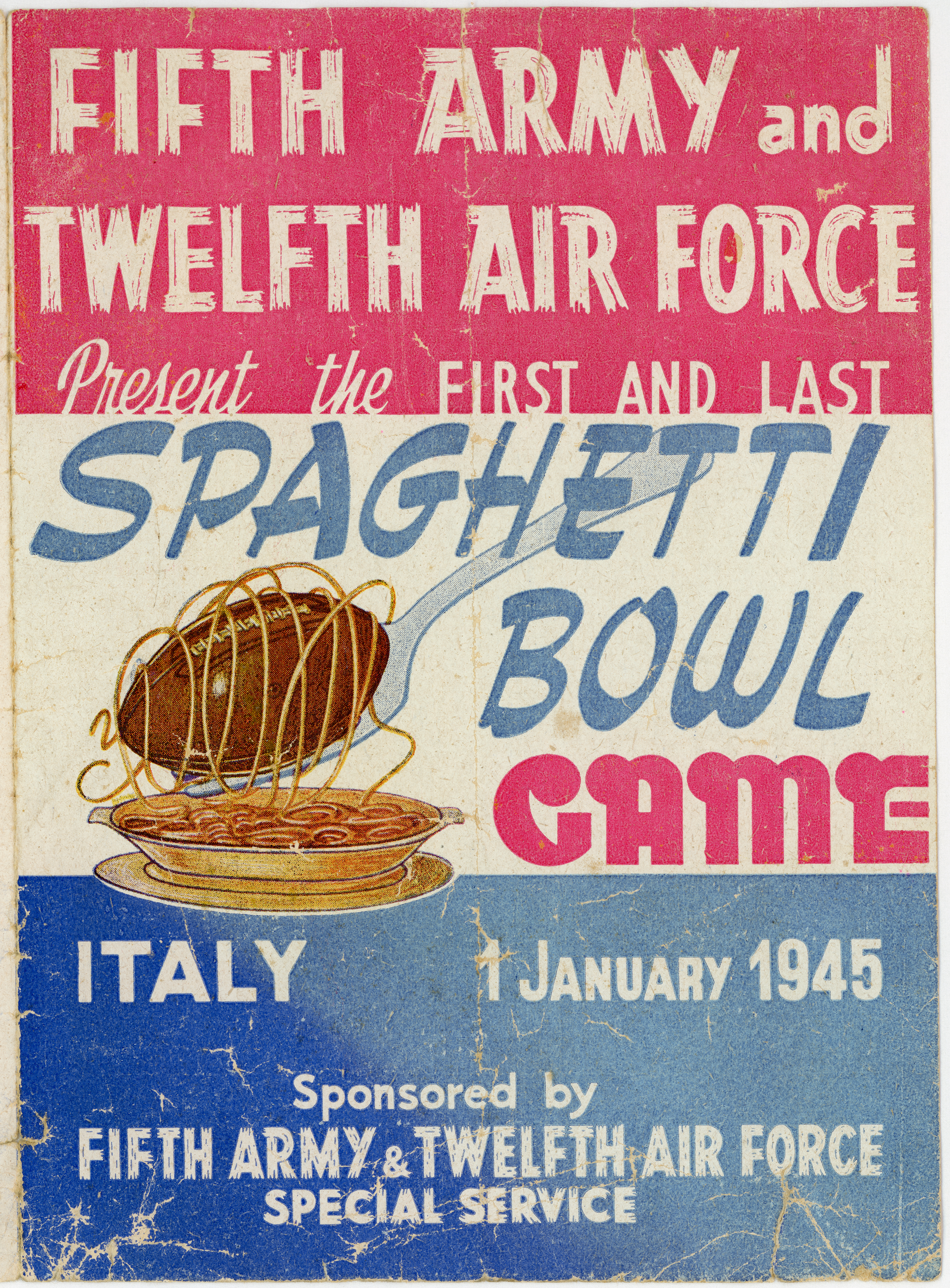
| 12th Air Force Bridgebusters | 5th Army Krautclouters |
| 0 | 20 |
| Head coach: Sparky Miller | Head coach: Lou Bush |
| | 1 | 2 | 3 | 4 | Total |
|---|---|---|---|---|---|
| 12th Air Force | 0 | 0 | 0 | 0 | 0 |
| 5th Army | 0 | 7 | 13 | 0 | 20 |
- Date: 1 January 1945
- Stadium: Stadio Giovanni Berta
- Location: Florence, Italy
- Referee: Maj. Roy Pille
- Halftime show: Peggy Jean
- Attendance: 25,000

The Spaghetti Bowl was an American football bowl game played between Fifth Army and Twelfth Air Force in Florence, Italy, on 1 January 1945. The game was won by the Army 20–0.

== Background ==
During World War II, it was not uncommon for American military personnel to hold football games while stationed overseas in order to maintain morale. For example, 1 January 1945 also saw matches in France (the Riviera Bowl in Marseille) and Britain (the Coffee Bowl in London). Post-war military games also took place, such as an Associated Press wire report noting a contest between American soldiers from Salzburg and airmen from Wiesbaden Army Airfield, played in Leghorn, Italy in 1953.

While based in Florence, the Twelfth Air Force's Special Service received a set of 120 football uniforms and organized a game with the Fifth Army. The Army squad, known as the Krautclouters, was coached by Lou Bush, a Captain and former star for the University of Massachusetts Minutemen in football and basketball who also played baseball in the St. Louis Cardinals' farm system. The 12th Air Force, who went by the team name Bridgebusters, was skippered by Major George "Sparky" Miller, a former lineman and assistant coach with Indiana University.

Players for the Army included Philadelphia Eagles tackle Sergeant Cecil Sturgeon and black Los Angeles Bulldogs fullback Corporal John "Big Six" Moody. Sturgeon was the lone player in the game with National Football League experience, and he served as the Army's captain; Air Force tackle Bernard Buckiewitz was also listed on the program as a former member of the Green Bay Packers, though he did not play an official game for them. The Air Force was captained by Lieutenant George Barnes, a former quarterback at the University of Maryland.

== Game ==
The Spaghetti Bowl served as the de facto championship game between the service teams of the European military theater. As it was the only edition with the war close to conclusion, it was branded the "First and Last Spaghetti Bowl". It was played at Stadio Giovanni Berta, but the location was kept secret for fear of an air raid by the Luftwaffe; reports after the game told of a German broadcast proclaiming it would be "a great day for an air raid at Florence" while another said, "Nero fiddled while Rome burned and the Fifth army and 12th airforce are going to play football while Florence burns." Practices for the game were also held in private, prompting the AP's Sid Feder to quip that the teams were more "hush hush than a ward room where they plan an amphibious landing." Lockheed P-38 Lightning aircraft flew over the stadium on patrol duty, though no attack ultimately took place.

25,000 attended the game, with all ticketed spectators being military personnel though some civilians sneaked in. Due to the cold weather, the Red Cross provided concessions like hot dogs, coffee, and donuts. Other attendees came as part of a United Service Organizations tour, including Broadway theatre singer Ella Logan, Brooklyn Dodgers manager Leo Durocher, and New York Giants outfielder Joe Medwick; Durocher and Medwick also gave speeches at halftime. 56-person Army bands and majorette Peggy Jean performed at the game, while parade floats were constructed out of Army vehicles with Women's Army Corps members riding them. The game also included a mule as a mascot.

Moody rushed for the first two touchdowns of the game, while Georgetown wide receiver Lt. Arthur Lemke caught the third and final touchdown from ex-Florida quarterback Private Frank Buel. The game's trophy was a metal bowl containing paper spaghetti, while the Krautclouters also received brass medals.

== Gallery ==
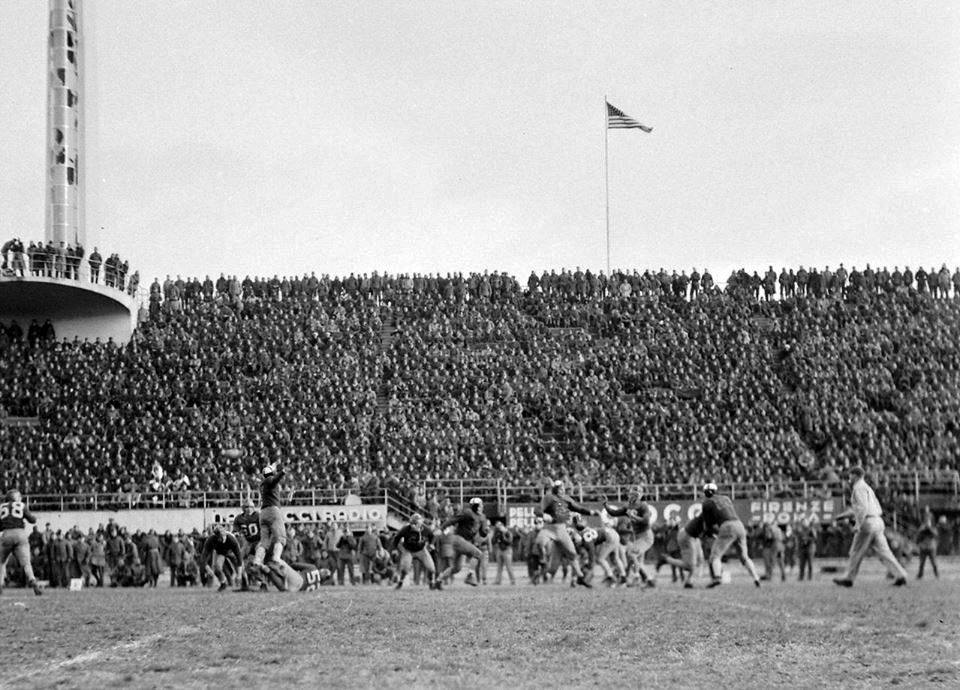
Game action

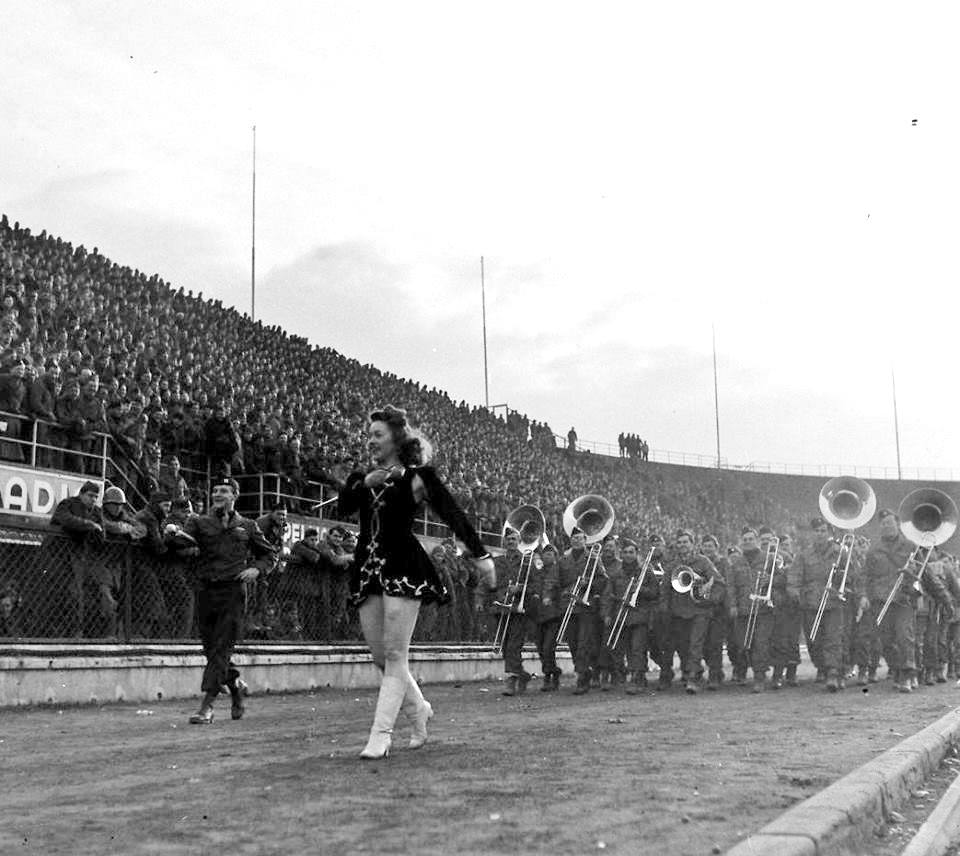
Peggy Jean performing on the sideline with an Army band

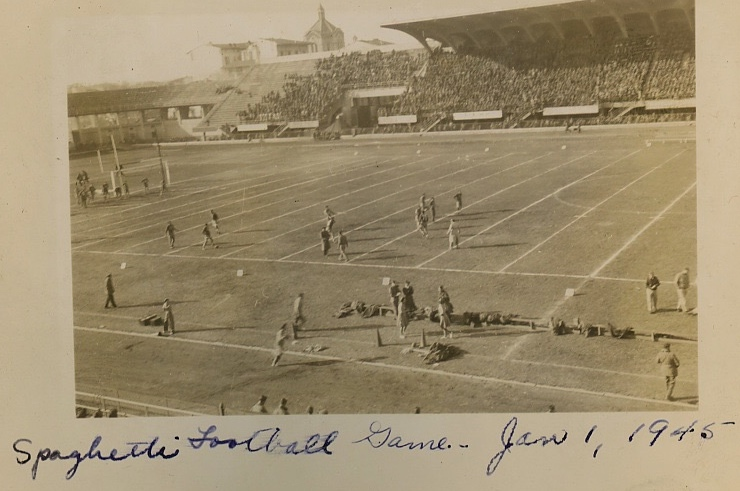
Aerial shot

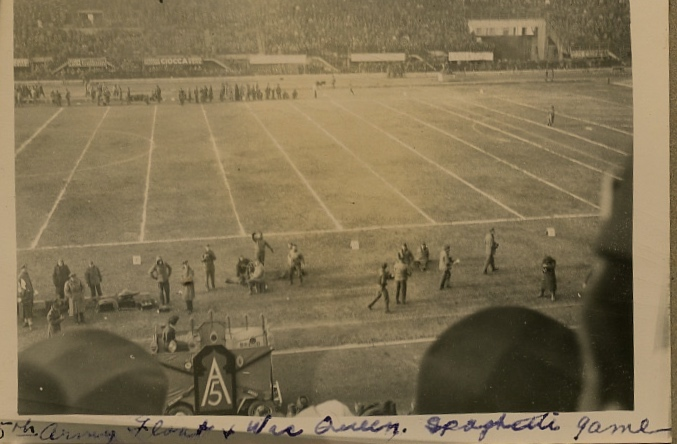
Army float and WAC queens on parade

== See also ==
- List of American football games in Europe during World War II
- Atom Bowl – American football game between United States servicemen after the Pacific War
