= Cecil Sturgeon =

American football player (1919–1972)

No. 71
- Position: Tackle

Personal information
- Born: June 27, 1919; Carnduff, Saskatchewan, CAN
- Died: February 1972 (aged 52)

Career information
- College: North Dakota State

Career history
- Philadelphia Eagles (1941); Wilmington Clippers (1941)

Career statistics
- Games played: 6
- Stats at Pro Football Reference

Cecil Owen "Dick" Sturgeon (June 27, 1919 – February 1972) was an American football offensive tackle. He attended North Dakota State University.

In 1941, he played in the National Football League for the Philadelphia Eagles before joining the Wilmington Clippers for the rest of the year. In addition to playing both offense and defense for the Clippers, he worked at the Pusey & Jones shipyard in Wilmington.

During World War II, Sturgeon joined the United States Army in 1942 and worked in the military police for the 91st Division based at Camp White. He eventually went overseas and served with the United States Fifth Army. In 1945, he participated in the Spaghetti Bowl football game in Italy, where he was the captain of the Fifth Army team.
