= Naomi Pollard Dobson =

American librarian and educator (1883–1971)

Naomi Willie Pollard Dobson
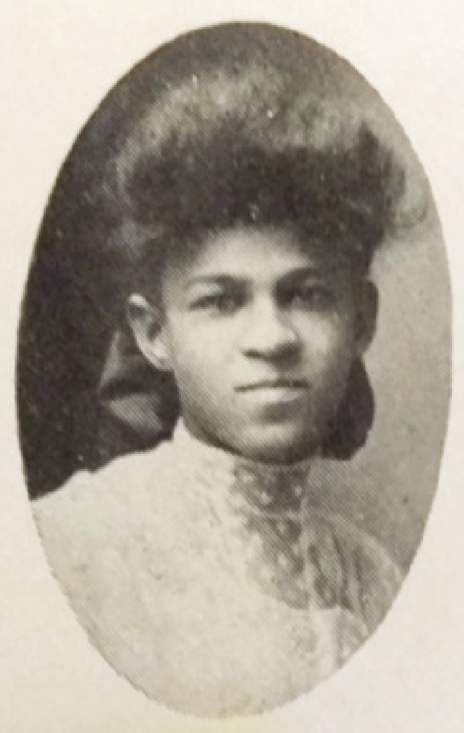
- Dobson in 1905
- Born: October 11, 1883; Mexico, Missouri, U.S.
- Died: August 14, 1971 (aged 87); New York City, New York, U.S.
- Education: Northwestern University (AB)
- Occupations: librarian; educator
- Employer(s): Wilberforce University; Chicago Public Library
- Relatives: Fritz Pollard (brother); Luther J. Pollard (brother)

Naomi Willie Pollard Dobson (October 11, 1883 – August 14, 1971) was an American librarian, educator, and civic leader based in Chicago and Sioux City, Iowa. In 1905, she became the first Black woman to graduate from Northwestern University.

== Early life and education ==
Dobson was born Naomi Willie Pollard in Mexico, Missouri, on October 11, 1883. She was the third of eight children of John W. Pollard, a barber and Union army veteran, and Catherine Amanda Hughes Pollard, a seamstress. Her siblings all met with professional and personal success. Her brothers included NFL Pro Football Hall of Famer player and coach Fritz Pollard and advertising executive and businessman Luther J. Pollard.

The Pollard family moved to Chicago in 1886, where Naomi grew up as a member of the Black middle class and lived in the Rogers Park neighborhood, where the Pollards were the only Black family at the time. She entered Lake View High School in 1898 and graduated in June 1901. She enrolled in the College of Liberal Arts at Northwestern University in the fall of 1901 and graduated in 1905, becoming the first Black woman to receive an academic degree (a Bachelor of Arts or AB) from Northwestern. One of only two Black students at Northwestern at the time, she probably lived with her parents, as Black students were barred from campus housing after white students protested.

== Career and civic leadership ==
After graduating, Dobson embarked on a career as a teacher of English literature at segregated public high schools in Baltimore and East St. Louis from 1905 to 1910. She took education courses at the University of Chicago in the summers of 1910 and 1911. In the fall of 1911, she decided on a career change and enrolled in the newly formed Library Training School at the Chicago Public Library, an intensive six-month program to train senior library assistants. Completing the program in 1912, she worked at the CPL branch library at the Hebrew Institute of Chicago, serving a predominantly Jewish immigrant community, from 1912 to 1915, first as a page and then as a senior assistant children's librarian under the direction of head librarian Matilda Nodek. Dobson and fellow Black librarian Vivian G. Harsh were both appointed children's librarians on April 26, 1913.

In 1914 Dobson became an instructor at Wilberforce University in Ohio. The head and sole instructor of the department of library economy, Dobson taught two courses on library classification, collection development, and research methods to aspiring teachers. She managed the college library and expanded it to 10,000 volumes, implementing a new subject-based classification system.

She married Dr. Richard Allen Dobson in 1916 and moved to Sioux City, Iowa, where she worked as a homemaker and civic leader while her husband practiced medicine. Their only child, Richard Allen Dobson Jr., was born in 1917. She participated in the League of Women Voters, the American Association of University Women, and the Iowa Federation of Colored Women's Clubs, of which she was elected president in 1931. A charter member of the Sioux City NAACP, she helped lead a campaign that blocked the segregation of Sioux City swimming pools and hotels in the 1940s. She also helped secure passage of the city's first fair employment laws.

== Later life and death ==
In 1952, Dobson and her husband retired to New York City, where their son worked as a pediatrician at Harlem Hospital. In New York she served as president of the Sydenham Hospital Women's Auxiliary and became a life member of the NAACP. After a period of hospitalization at Roosevelt Hospital, she died at her home in New York City on August 14, 1971, at the age of 87.

Her obituary appeared in the New York Amsterdam News and on the front page of the Sioux City Journal.
