= Chicago Black Hawks (American football) =

Defunct American Football team

The Chicago Black Hawks were an all-African American professional football team established in 1928 by Fritz Pollard (who was also the team's quarterback, running back, coach, and owner). The Black Hawks played against white teams around Chicago, but enjoyed their greatest success by scheduling exhibition games against West Coast teams during the winter months.

Due to poor attendance and the country's economic situation, the team played most of its games on the road, and disbanded three years later in 1932 while playing on the West Coast. Fritz Pollard would return to barnstorming in 1936 with the Harlem Brown Bombers.
