= Fritz Pollard =

American football player and coach (1894–1986)

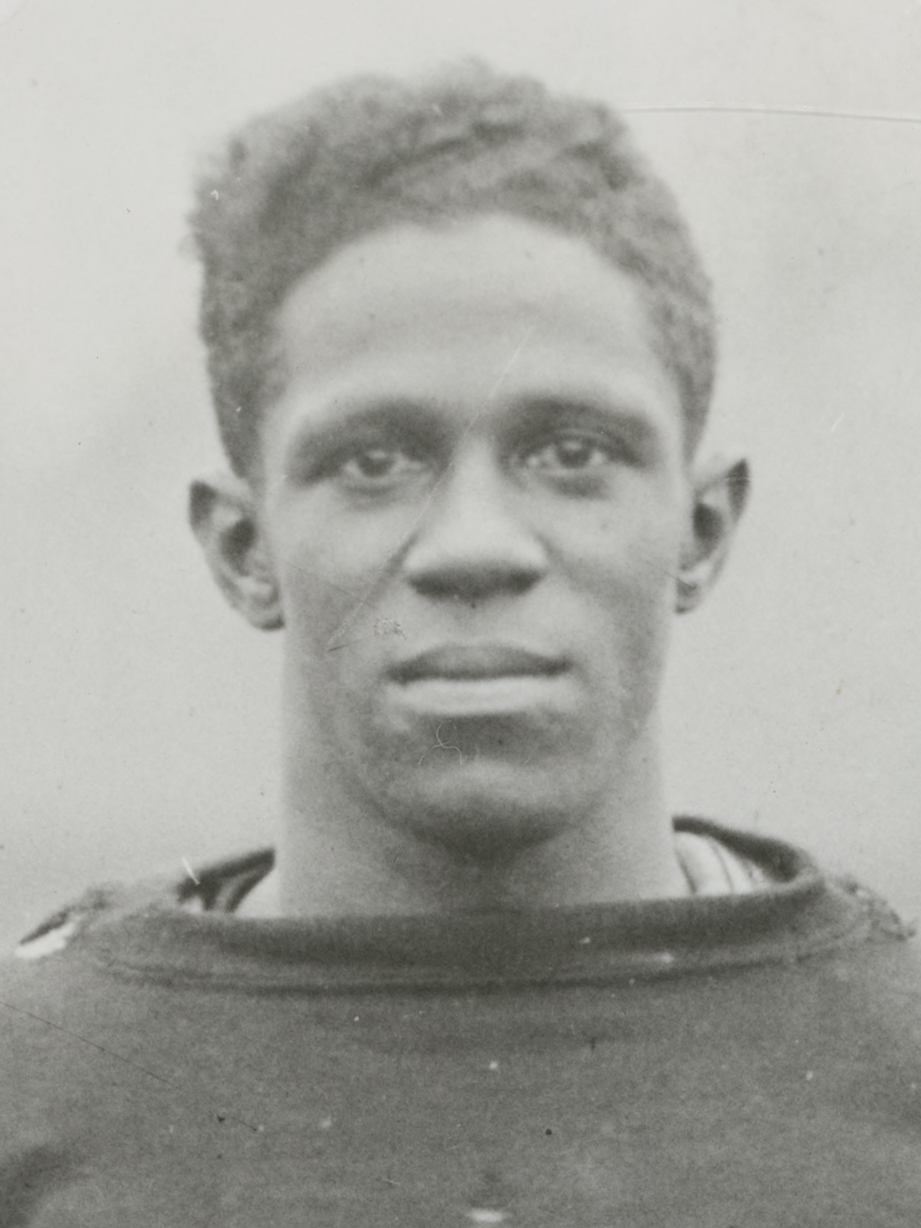
- Pollard in 1916

No. 9, 1, 11
- Position: Back

Personal information
- Born: January 27, 1894; Chicago, Illinois, U.S.
- Died: May 11, 1986 (aged 92); Silver Spring, Maryland, U.S.
- Listed height: 5 ft 9 in (1.75 m)
- Listed weight: 165 lb (75 kg)

Career information
- High school: Lane Tech (Chicago)
- College: Brown (1915–1916)

Career history

Playing
- Akron Pros (1920–1921); Union Club of Phoenixville (1920); Milwaukee Badgers (1922); Gilberton Cadamounts (1923–1924); Hammond Pros (1923, 1925); Providence Steam Roller (1925); Akron Indians (1925–1926)

Coaching
- Lincoln (PA) (1918–1920); Akron Pros (1921); Hammond Pros (1925); Chicago Black Hawks (1928)

Awards and highlights
- NFL champion (1920); First-team All-Pro (1920); Consensus All-American (1916)

Career statistics
- Rushing touchdowns: 16
- Receiving touchdowns: 2
- Total touchdowns: 18
- Stats at Pro Football Reference
- Coaching profile at Pro Football Reference
- Pro Football Hall of Fame
- College Football Hall of Fame

Frederick Douglass "Fritz" Pollard (January 27, 1894 – May 11, 1986) was an American professional football player and coach. In 1921, he became the first African-American head coach in the National Football League (NFL). Pollard and Bobby Marshall were the first two African-American players in the NFL in 1920. He is also recognized as the first Black quarterback in NFL history, playing the position for the Hammond Pros in 1923. Football pioneer Walter Camp called Pollard "one of the greatest runners these eyes have ever seen."

== Early life ==
Pollard was born in Chicago to John W. Pollard, a barber and Union army veteran, and Catherine Amanda Hughes Pollard, a seamstress. Pollard's siblings included advertising executive Luther J. Pollard and librarian Naomi Pollard Dobson.

He attended Albert G. Lane Manual Training High School in Chicago, also known as "Lane Tech," where he played football, baseball, and ran track. He then went to Brown University, majoring in chemistry. He was also initiated into the Alpha Gamma chapter of Alpha Phi Alpha fraternity at Brown University. Pollard played halfback on the Brown football team, which went to the 1916 Rose Bowl. He became the first African American running back to be named to Walter Camp's All-America team.

== Career ==
Pollard coached Lincoln University's football team in Oxford, Pennsylvania during the 1918 to 1920 seasons and served as athletic director of the school's World War I era Students' Army Training Corps. During 1918–1919, he led the team to a victorious season defeating Howard University's Bisons 13–0 in the annual Thanksgiving classic as well as Hampton University (7–0) on November 9, 1918, and teams of military recruits at Camp Dix (19–0) on November 2, 1918, and Camp Upton (41–0). By the fall of 1920, he had begun to play for Akron, missing key Lincoln losses to Hampton (0–14) and Howard (0–42), much to the consternation of the alumni and administration. Paul Robeson was enlisted by Lincoln's alumni to coach the Thanksgiving 1920 game against Howard.

Pollard criticized Lincoln's administration, saying they had hampered his ability to coach and had refused to provide adequate travel accommodations for the team. "Prior to the Hampton game, the team was compelled to go to Hampton by boat, sleeping on the decks and under portholes," he told a reporter. "No cabins were provided, nor were they given a place to sleep after reaching Hampton. They lost the game through lack of rest." He also blamed the school for not providing the proper equipment. "I, myself, bought and paid $200 out of my pocket for football shoes for the team." He missed the 1920 Howard game, he said, because his Lincoln salary was so low that he was compelled to augment it with pay from Akron.

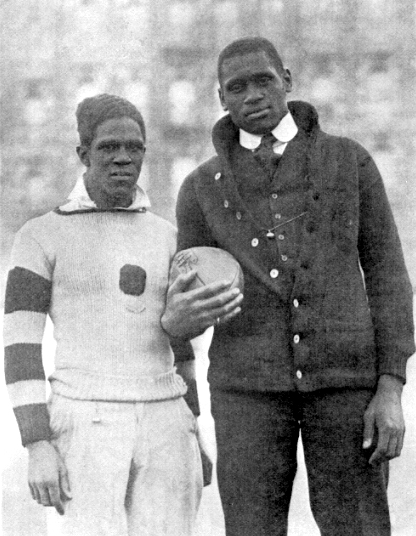
Pollard (left) and Paul Robeson in a photo from the March 1918 issue of The Crisis

He played professional football with the Akron Pros, the team he would lead to the APFA championship in 1920. In 1921, he became the co-head coach of the Akron Pros, while still maintaining his roster position as running back. He also played for the Milwaukee Badgers, Hammond Pros, Gilberton Cadamounts, Union Club of Phoenixville and Providence Steam Roller. An article in the October 1, 1921 issue of the Chicago Whip newspaper stated that Pollard served as "assistant coach of the backfield men" of Northwestern University's football team.

Some sources indicate that Pollard also served as co-coach of the Milwaukee Badgers with Budge Garrett for part of the 1922 season.

On November 19, 1922, Pollard and Paul Robeson led the Badgers to victory over the great Jim Thorpe and his Oorang Indians. The final was 13–0 with Robeson scoring both touchdowns in his finest pro football performance.

Fritz also coached the Gilberton Cadamounts, a non-NFL team. In 1923 and 1924, he served as head coach for the Hammond Pros.

Pollard, along with all nine of the African American players in the NFL at the time, were removed from the league at the end of the 1926 season, never to return again. He spent some time organizing all-African American barnstorming teams, including the Chicago Black Hawks in 1928 and the Harlem Brown Bombers in the 1930s.

== Later life ==
In the 1930s, Pollard founded his own professional football team, the Brown Bombers. The Depression ended the Brown Bombers' run in 1938, and Pollard went on to other ventures, including a talent agency, tax consulting, and film and music production. He produced Rockin' the Blues in 1956, which included such performers as Connie Carroll, The Harptones, The Five Miller Sisters, Pearl Woods, Linda Hopkins, Elyce Roberts, The Hurricanes, and The Wanderers.

=== New York Independent News ===
Pollard also published the New York Independent News from 1935 to 1942, purportedly the first African American-owned tabloid in New York City. The war and a rivalry forced it to close. The paper's offices were on 125th Street and at its peak, the paper had a weekly circulation of approximately thirty-five thousand, ranking it among the top most read Black newspapers in the country.

== Honors and legacy ==
- In 1981 Brown University conferred an honorary Doctor of Laws (LL.D.) degree on Pollard, recognizing his achievements as athlete and leader.
- In 2005, Fritz Pollard was posthumously inducted into the Pro Football Hall of Fame.
- In 2015, Pollard was posthumously inducted into the Rose Bowl Hall of Fame.
- Pollard appears as a free agent in Madden NFL 09 and Madden NFL 10 and is also a part of the game's Hall of Fame feature.
- Pollard's son Fritz Pollard Jr. won the bronze medal for 110 m hurdles at the 1936 Summer Olympics in Berlin.
- The Fritz Pollard Alliance, a group promoting minority hiring throughout the NFL, is named for Pollard.
- Brown University and the Black Coaches & Administrators co-sponsor the annual Fritz Pollard Award, which is presented to the college or professional coach chosen by the BCA as coach of the year.

== Head coaching record ==
=== College ===
Year	Team	Overall	Conference	Standing	Bowl/playoffs
Lincoln Lions (Colored Intercollegiate Athletic Association) (1918–1920)
1918	Lincoln	5–0	2–0	1st (Note: From 1918 to 1920, the Colored Intercollegiate Athletic Association (CIAA) did not recognize a champion in football)	
1919	Lincoln	2–0–1	2–0–1	T–1st	
1920	Lincoln	3–2	1–2	5th	
Lincoln:		10–2–1	5–2–1		
Total:		10–2–1			

== See also ==
- List of African-American firsts
- Racial issues faced by black quarterbacks
