= List of American football games in Europe during World War II =

The following a list of American football games that United States Armed Forces servicemen played in Europe during World War II. Games are listed in chronological order. Most games took place in the United Kingdom.

Date	Location	Winning team	Losing team	Final score	Attendance	Game
November 14, 1942	(United Kingdom) Belfast, Northern Ireland	Yarvard	Hale	9–7	10,000	Held at Ravenhill Stadium, the team names were parodies of the college football schools Harvard and Yale. Ticket sales went to the Royal Victoria Hospital, Belfast and SSAFA.
November 21, 1942	(United Kingdom) Larne, Northern Ireland	Yarvard	Tech	14–0		Much of Tech's roster were players from Hale. Held at Sandy Bay Playing Fields, ticket sales went to the Red Cross.
May 8, 1943	(United Kingdom) London, England	Crimson Tide Artillerymen	Fighting Irish Engineers	19–6	25,000	
January 1, 1944	(United Kingdom) Newry, Northern Ireland	Navy Galloping Gaels	Army Wolverines	0–0	2,500	Known as the Potato Bowl.
February 13, 1944	(United Kingdom) London, England	Canada	United States	16–6	30,000	Known as Tea Bowl I.
March 19, 1944	(United Kingdom) London, England	United States	Canada	18–0	50,000	Known as Coffee Bowl I.
November 12, 1944	(United Kingdom) London, England	Army G.I.s	Navy Bluejackets	20–0	~40,000	Known as the G.I. Bowl.
November 23, 1944	(United Kingdom) Nottingham, England	Troop Carrier Command Berger's Bouncers	Henley's Hurricanes	6–0	25,000	
November 26, 1944	(Netherlands) Maastricht	29th Tactical Air Force Maroon Wave	9th Air Force Thunderbirds	3–0	?	
December 19, 1944	(France) Paris	9th Air Force	1st General Hospital	6–0	20,000	Known as the Parc des Princes Bowl.
December 30, 1944	(United Kingdom) Leeds, England	Air Services Command Bearcats	Troop Carrier Command Berger's Bouncers	12–6	40,000	
December 31, 1944	(United Kingdom) London, England	Air Services Command Warriors	8th Air Force Shuttle Raiders	13–0	12,000	Known as Tea Bowl II.
January 1, 1945	(United Kingdom) Belfast, Northern Ireland	Navy	Army	0–0	?	Known as the Potato Bowl.
January 1, 1945	(France) Marseille	Railway Shop Battalion Unit	Army All-Stars	37–0	18,000	Known as the Riviera Bowl.
January 1, 1945	(Italy) Florence	5th Army	12th Air Force	20–4	?	Known as the Spaghetti Bowl.
January 1, 1945	(United Kingdom) London, England	Army Air Base Bonecrushers	Army Airway Rams	6–0	1,200	Known as Coffee Bowl II.

== See also ==
- List of World War II military service football teams
- History of American football
