= Luther J. Pollard =

Advertising executive and businessman

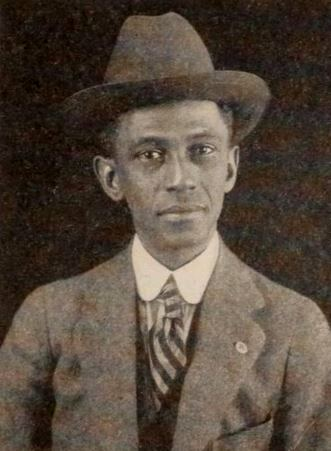

Luther J. Pollard (born January 4, 1878, died 1977) was an advertising executive and businessman in the film industry in Chicago.

John W. Pollard was his father. He was a boxer and served in a "Colored" unit of the Union Army during the American Civil War. Luther's brother Frederick "Fritz" Douglass Pollard played football for Brown University, worked for the studio, coached NFL football, and established the New York Independent News newspaper. Their sister, Naomi Pollard Dobson, was a teacher and librarian who in 1905 became the first Black woman to graduate from Northwestern University.

His brother Fritz Pollard discussed their family and the discrimination they faced in a 1979 interview he gave at Brown University.

The 1976 documentary film The Very Last Laugh is about the Ebony Film Corporation and Pollard's filmmaking career in Chicago. It includes footage of Pollard being interviewed. William Franklin Grisham wrote and directed the film. Pollard said he rented the studio to Oscar Micheaux to make Within Our Gates and other of his early films after Micheaux came to Chicago from Sioux City, Iowa. Pollard said he had a sister who helped Micheaux edit the book.
