= John "Big Train" Moody =

American football player (born 1917)

No. 55, 44, 84, 64
- Position: Fullback

Personal information
- Born: July 15, 1917; Manchester, Georgia, U.S.
- Died: 1995 (aged 77 or 78)
- Listed height: 5 ft 8 in (1.73 m)
- Listed weight: 230 lb (104 kg)

Career information
- High school: Freeport (Freeport, Pennsylvania)
- College: Morris Brown
- NFL draft: 1942: undrafted

Career history
- Los Angeles Mustangs (1943); Montreal Alouettes (1946); New York Yankees (1947)*
- * Offseason or practice squad member only

Awards and highlights
- Black college national champion (1940)

John Clifford "Big Train" Moody (July 15, 1917 – 1995), also nicknamed Big Six, was an American football fullback. He played college football at Morris Brown College, and professionally for the Los Angeles Mustangs of the Pacific Coast Professional Football League and the Montreal Alouettes of the Interprovincial Rugby Football Union (IRFU). He was inducted into the Black College Football Hall of Fame in 2022.

== Early life ==
John Clifford Moody was born on July 15, 1917, in Manchester, Georgia. He moved to Pennsylvania at an early age. He attended Freeport High School in Freeport, Pennsylvania.

== College career ==
Moody played for the Morris Brown Wolverines of Morris Brown College from 1939 to 1941 as a fullback and placekicker. He was capable of kicking the ball with either foot. He scored 109 points in 1940, helping the Wolverines win the Black college national championship. His 290 career points set a black college record.

== Professional career ==
Moody then served in the United States Army during World War II. On November 15, 1942, he played for the Fort Knox Armoraiders in a charity game against the Pittsburgh Steelers. He rushed for 60 yards as Fort Knox lost 28–0. Moody played for the Los Angeles Mustangs of the Pacific Coast Professional Football League in 1943 and kicked one field goal. On January 1, 1945, in the Spaghetti Bowl in Italy, Moody scored two touchdowns and two extra points to help the Fifth Army beat the Twelfth Air Force by a score of 20–0.

Moody started all 12 games for the Montreal Alouettes of the Interprovincial Rugby Football Union (IRFU) in 1946, scoring one rushing touchdown, one passing touchdown, one field goal, and four rouges. The Alouettes finished the year with a 7–3–2 record and lost in the IRFU final to the Toronto Argonauts.

In June 1947, it was reported that Moody had signed with the New York Yankees of the All-America Football Conference. He was released in early September 1947 after suffering knee problems.

== Personal life ==
Moody died in 1995. He was inducted into the Black College Football Hall of Fame in 2022.
