= The Hurricanes =

British R&B band

The Fabulous Hurricanes

Background information
- Origin: Edinburgh, Scotland
- Genres: Rock 'n' Roll, R&B
- Years active: 2004–present
- Members: James Adam; Luke Bullard; Ed Cox; Triss Duncan
- Website: Official Facebook page

The Fabulous Hurricanes (formerly The Hurricanes) are a rhythm & blues group originally from Edinburgh, now based in London. The band, currently a four-piece consists of a drummer, James Adam; bassist, Triss Duncan, guitarist, Luke Ballard, and keyboardist, Ed Cox; with three members of the group – Cox, Duncan, and Ballard – singing. The band plays 1950s rock and roll and 1960s rhythm and blues with a modern twist covering various artists including Ray Charles, Dr. Feelgood, Jerry Lee Lewis, Stevie Wonder, The Coasters and Muddy Waters.

== Progression ==
After all meeting at school in 2004, the group began performing around Scotland, building up a following. What followed was national radio plays on XFM Scotland (now known as Capital Scotland) and BBC Radio Scotland. Articles about the band have appeared in The List, Edinburgh Festival Magazine, Edinburgh Evening News, The Scotsman and The Skinny. In 2007 and 2008, The Fabulous Hurricanes played a string of shows most notably supporting Neils Children and Bombay Bicycle Club, and they were voted number 4 on the list of 'Scotland's Best Unsigned Bands' by The Scotsman. In 2008, the band were sent a letter by Paul McCartney inviting them to his Liverpool concert after he heard their music, and in 2010 the band performed with Kitty Daisy & Lewis to a sold-out crowd in Edinburgh.

== Membership Timeline ==
The band was originally composed of four members. James Adam played the drums, and Will Blow played the bass and was lead vocalist. Ed Cox performed the keyboard and sang backing vocals. Sholto Dobie played the guitar.
