= Walter Koppisch =

American football player (1901–1953)

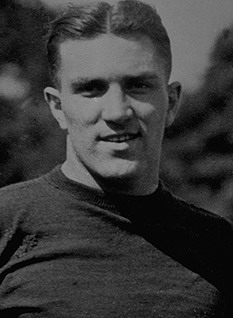

No. 16, 0
- Position: Halfback

Personal information
- Born: June 6, 1901; Pendleton, New York, U.S.
- Died: November 5, 1953 (aged 52); New York, New York, U.S.
- Listed height: 5 ft 10 in (1.78 m)
- Listed weight: 180 lb (82 kg)

Career information
- High school: Masten Park (Buffalo, New York)
- College: Columbia (1921–1924)

Career history

Playing
- Buffalo Bisons (1925); New York Giants (1926)

Coaching
- Buffalo Bisons (1925) Head coach

Awards and highlights
- First-team All-American (1924); Third-team All-American (1923)

Career statistics
- Games played: 15
- Games started: 9
- Stats at Pro Football Reference

Head coaching record
- Career: 1–6–2 (.222)
- Coaching profile at Pro Football Reference
- College Football Hall of Fame

Walter Frederic Koppisch (June 6, 1901 – November 5, 1953) was an American professional football halfback in the National Football League (NFL) for the Buffalo Bisons and New York Giants. He played college football for the Columbia Lions.

At age 23, he was named the head coach of the Buffalo Bisons, making him among the youngest head coaches in NFL history.

He was elected to the College Football Hall of Fame in 1981.

== Career ==
=== High school and college football ===
While playing high school ball at Masten Park High, now City Honors School, in Buffalo, New York, he led his team to three consecutive Harvard Cup championships, which denoted Buffalo city champions. Upon graduation, Koppisch went on to star at Columbia University, where he captained the Lions for three seasons. While playing Columbia's backfield, Koppisch was teammates with future New York Yankee Lou Gehrig. In 1924 he was received All-American honors by Walter Camp.

=== NFL ===
==== Buffalo ====
In September 1925, it was announced that Koppisch would be returning to Buffalo to coach the Buffalo Bisons. He was only 23 years-old at the time, making him one of the youngest head coaches in NFL history. However, the newly established New York Giants were seeking a well-known player which they could build a team around, and Koppisch was the top name on their list. According to Harry March, in his book Pro Football: Its Ups and Downs (the accuracy of which is disputed), the Giants stopped pursuing Koppisch at the request of the Bisons.

While expectations were high for the Bisons in 1925, the reality was that the team needed to undergo a rebuilding process. Many of the team's top players from the previous season had left the team. These players included mainstays Tommy Hughitt, Benny Boynton, Pete Calac, and Eddie Kaw. Upon assuming the job of coach, Koppisch implemented the same system that was in use at Columbia University by coach Frank "Buck" O'Neill, with himself as the offense's focal point. Meanwhile, the new players consisted of stand-out collegians, but not one of them an All-American.

===== Leak dispute with the media =====
At one point, the Buffalo Evening News reported on several leaks concerning the Bisons roster. According to the News, the story was to be kept under wraps until a time approved by Koppisch. However, the News reportedly saw the same story published in a rival newspaper (presumably the now-defunct Buffalo Courier-Express) and ran the story. The News maintained that it was Koppisch who broke the agreement by leaking the story to the rival newspaper. As a result, Koppisch removed the News reporter from training camp. The News carried its grudge against the Bisons for the entire season, publishing only a few very small articles about the team.

===== Rough start =====
The Bisons 1925 season, ended with a 1-6-2 record. The team began the season with back-to-back losses against the Frankford Yellow Jackets and Pottsville Maroons. They then posted scoreless ties against the Rochester Jeffersons and Akron Pros. During the Rochester game, Koppisch and Jim Kendrick made huge runs on offense. However, the Jeffersons defense stopped the Bisons from scoring. Meanwhile, during the Akron showdown, the Bisons defense held future Hall of Famer Fritz Pollard in check throughout the game, allowing the Pros just seven first downs for the entire game. However, the Pros defense held Buffalo to only two first downs. The team's only victory in 1925 came in a 17–6 win against the Columbus Tigers.

===== Playing through pain =====
On October 22, Koppisch was involved in an automobile accident. He received some bad cuts and bruises on his legs, and was advised to sit out a few games to allow his injuries to heal. This forced Koppisch to miss the November 1 rematch against Frankford. The Bisons would go on to lose that game 12–3. Meanwhile, Koppisch was forced to miss a second game at New York's Polo Grounds. The game was to be a homecoming for Koppisch since he played at the Polo Grounds while attending Columbia. Upon hearing that Koppisch would not be playing in the game, a large group of fans from Columbia, who turned out just to see him play, booed him. The fans were unaware of the injuries suffered by Koppisch in the October 22 accident. However, the boos led Koppisch to come out and play two series of downs in the second quarter. The Bisons were still down by 7 points and Koppisch, as a result of his injuries, was unable to get the team to score. He later returned in the fourth quarter to attempt a score while deep into Giants' territory, but to no avail. The Giants held on for the 7–0 victory and Buffalo's record fell to 1–4–2. It would be Koppisch's last appearance in a Buffalo uniform. The Bisons ended their 1925 season with losses to the Providence Steam Roller and eventual champions the Chicago Cardinals.

===== Termination =====
The Bisons did not ask Koppisch to return as coach for the 1926 season. While Buffalo expected him to challenge for the NFL title, the environment in the city proved that challenge to be impossible. The franchise suffered from years of declining attendance, which in turn meant little money with which the team could sign decent players. Meanwhile, many of the NFL's top team were able to exploit Buffalo's inexperienced team.

=== Retirement ===
In 1926, Koppisch signed with the New York Giants, playing under head coach Joe Alexander, a fellow Western New York native. Koppisch played just one season with the team, seeing action in nine of the team's fourteen games that year. After the 1926 season (one in which there were at least 31 top level professional teams between the NFL and the American Football League), the number of pro teams dropped dramatically: half of the NFL teams, and all but one of the AFL teams, folded, significantly increasing the pool of available talent. Koppisch gave up on professional football.

Koppisch remained in New York City after his playing career. At one point, he was a business partner of Lou Gehrig, his former Columbia teammate. Koppisch later became an investigator for the Securities and Exchange Commission.

== Head coaching record ==
Team	Year	Regular season					Postseason			
Team	Year	Won	Lost	Ties	Win %	Finish	Won	Lost	Win %	Result
BUF	1925	1	6	2	.222	15th in NFL	–	–	–	–
BUF Total		1	6	2	.222		–	–	–	–
NFL Total		1	6	2	.222		–	–	–	–
Total		1	6	2	.222		–	–	–	–
