= Karl Thielscher =

American football player (1895–1990)

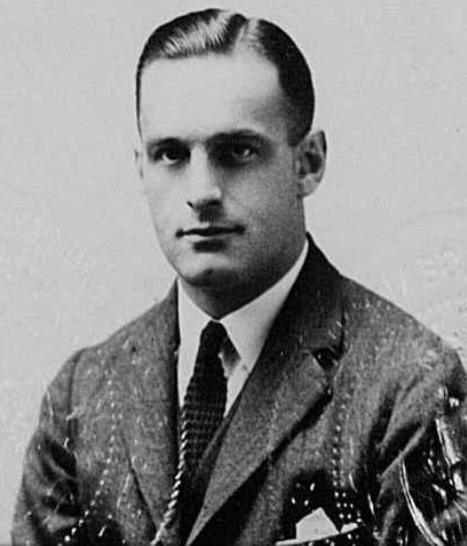
- Thielscher, c. 1924

Profile
- Position: Fullback

Personal information
- Born: April 24, 1895; Brookline, Massachusetts, U.S.
- Died: May 5, 1990 (aged 95); Palm Beach, Florida, U.S.
- Listed height: 5 ft 11 in (1.80 m)
- Listed weight: 180 lb (82 kg)

Career information
- High school: Brookline
- College: Dartmouth (1913–1916)

Career history
- Buffalo All-Americans (1920)

Career statistics
- Games played: 2
- Games started: 1
- Stats at Pro Football Reference

Karl Leavitt Thielscher (April 24, 1895 – May 5, 1990) was an American professional football player who was a fullback for one season in the American Professional Football Association (APFA) for the Buffalo All-Americans. He played college football for the Dartmouth Big Green from 1913 to 1916 and received three varsity letters. After his graduation from Dartmouth College, Thielscher served three years in the military before his brief stint in the APFA in 1920. Following his playing career, he began serving as a football official.

== Early life and military career ==
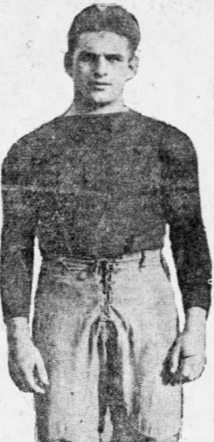
Thielscher, c. 1916

Karl Leavitt Thielscher was born on April 24, 1895, in Brookline, Massachusetts. He attended Brookline High School, being a team captain, before going to Dartmouth College, where he was an "outstanding player" in both football and baseball. Nicknamed "Barney", he attended Dartmouth from 1913 to 1916 and was a three-year letterman with the football team. He graduated in 1917, before being drafted to serve in World War I.

In July 1917 The Boston Globe reported him as in the Watertown Arsenal, writing, "Karl Thielscher, the old Brookline High, Tedesco Club and Dartmouth College infielder, is now located at the Watertown Arsenal. He will have his Saturday afternoons off until he is sent to France and is rather anxious to keep in good trim by playing with some strong semi-professional teams."

Thielscher was later transferred from the ordnance department of the army to the Aviation Corps and was given several months furlough, returning to Dartmouth as an assistant football coach.

In June 1918, Thielscher briefly played third base for the St. Patrick's Catholic Club baseball team. In a game against Camp Holabird, he was described as the "batting star" by The Baltimore Sun. The paper noted:

Lieutenant Thielscher, the former Dartmouth star, who covered third for the Irish lads, was the batting star, coming to the bat in the ninth inning and hitting the first pitched ball to right field for a home run. Again in the tenth, after Bruff had singled to right, scoring Yoith, he drove the ball clear to Linwood avenue, scoring Miller with the winning run. It was the longest hit ever made on the new field at Patterson Park, but he is only credited with a single, Miller being on third at the time, and scoring the winning run.

Thielscher was a lieutenant by 1918 and by 1919, he was a first lieutenant and was serving as an officer for Camp Robinson.

== Professional career ==
Thielscher played professional football in the American Professional Football Association (APFA) for the Buffalo All-Americans in 1920. He appeared in two official games against non-league opponents. He was starting fullback in his first appearance, a 51–0 victory over All-Buffalo. The Buffalo Enquirer reported, "The Buffalo professional football team that has been assembled by Frank McNeill (Note: The Enquirer misspelled his name, which was "McNeil" rather than "McNeill".) yesterday again demonstrated its exceptional skill by easily defeating the All-Buffalos by the score of 51 to 0. The All-Buffalos were outclassed in every department of the game by the former college stars now known as the All-American eleven of this city." A fair catch called for by Thielscher that was interfered with drew a 15-yard penalty, which led to a field goal by Heinie Miller. The Buffalo Evening News mentioned that he was replaced by Charlie Mills before later coming back as a substitute for Ockie Anderson; Anderson later returned to the game, and Thielscher replaced Mills.

Thielscher made one other appearance during the 1920 APFA season, coming in late as a substitute for Andy Fletcher during a game against the Toledo Maroons. The Buffalo Enquirer on October 25, reported, "Buffalo's professional football eleven yesterday afternoon again demonstrated its wonderful strength and gridiron abilities when it soundly defeated the widely touted Toledo Maroons by the score of 38 to 0. There never was a time when the local eleven was in real danger, although the Maroons were not to be held too lightly as a football machine. It was only the remarkable individual plays of the Buffalo boys that accounted for the victory."

== Later life and death ==
Thielscher did not return to the team after their victory over the Maroons, and became a referee, officiating games less than a month later. In an October 1921 game between the All-Americans and Hammond Pros, APFA official Eugene W. Carson was severely injured after being accidentally stepped on by Ockie Anderson. With Carson unable to continue his duties, Thielscher became one of the referees chosen for a replacement officiating crew, being selected to the umpire position. He officiated the All-Americans game against the Columbus Panhandles on October 9, 1921, which was a 38–0 win for the All-Americans. Although Carson was able to return for the next game, Thielscher remained an official for several other All-Americans games, including against the New York Brickley Giants and Rochester Jeffersons.

In 1923, Thielscher returned to his alma mater of Dartmouth College to assist the football coaching staff.

Thielscher married Adele Duhrssen on September 20, 1928, at the Madison Avenue Presbyterian Church in New York City. The couple had two sons, Karl Jr., and David, both of whom played college football at Dartmouth. He worked for the Graybar Company, an electrical supply distributor, and served multiple roles until his retirement in 1957. He later moved to Palm Beach, Florida, where he died in 1990 at the age of 95.
