= Union Club of Phoenixville =

General information
- Founded: 1907; 119 years ago
- Folded: 1921; 105 years ago
- Stadium: Baker Bowl
- Headquartered: Phoenixville, Pennsylvania
- Colors: Red, White

Nickname
- "Big Red"

Team history
- Union Club (1907–1919); Phoenix Athletic Club (1919); Union Club of Phoenixville (1920–1921)

League / conference affiliations
- Independent

The Union Club of Phoenixville was a professional football team based in Phoenixville, Pennsylvania. The team was the result of a 1919 merger between the Phoenixville Union Club and the upstart Phoenix Athletic Club. From 1907 until 1919, the Union Club was considered one of the best football teams in eastern Pennsylvania. However, in 1919 the upstart Phoenix Athletic Club signed many of the top players of the area, leaving the Union Club no choice but to merge with the Phoenix A.C. The team is best known for defeating the Canton Bulldogs 13–7, in 1920. The team folded in 1921.

== History ==
=== Origins ===
In 1907 the Phoenixville Union Club fielded its first football team. The team frequently played rival clubs from Schuylkill County, as well as teams from Philadelphia and New Jersey. Within a few years, the Union Club became one of the strongest teams in the region. Several times they were declared the mythical "Champions of the Schuylkill Valley" and "Champions of Eastern Pennsylvania". However, the team experienced tragedy on occasion. In November 1913, George Gay, a star player for the Ursinus College football team, died from a neck injury three days after it was broken in a Phoenixille–Pottstown game. He broke his neck after being tackled from behind.

=== The merger ===
World War I and the 1918 flu pandemic had a severe impact on Phoenixville's 1917 football season. The team had only managed to schedule 5 games in 1917, while only one game was played in 1918. In 1919, the Union Club and the new Phoenix Athletic Club merged. The merger began when the Phoenix Athletic Club signed away many of the area's top football players. This left Union in a dilemma. In 1919, Union played what should have been an easy game against a local high school. However that game resulted in scoreless tie. As a result, the Union Club merged with the Phoenix A. C.

Meanwhile, the Union Club of Phoenixville ended their 1919 season with a 6–0–3 record. The final game of the season against the Conshohocken Athletic Club, ended in a scoreless tie. However Phoenixville, managed to sign many ex-college players to their roster including; Heinie Miller of Penn and Butch Spagna of Lehigh University.

=== 1920 ===
The 1920 Phoenixville Club fielded many of the top players of the era. These players included Lou Little, Lud Wray, Fats Eyrich, Bodie Weldon, Heinie Miller, Earl Potteiger, Stan Cofall and future Hall of Famer, Fritz Pollard. The club also fielded several members (eight in all, including Ockie Anderson and Swede Youngstrom) of the Buffalo All-Americans of the National Football League; Pollard and Cofall also had NFL jobs, Pollard with the Akron Pros and Cofall with the Cleveland Tigers. The NFL players would play a non-league game with Phoenixville on Saturdays, then hop the train for Buffalo or Ohio and the next day’s game. This arrangement helped the All-Americans earn extra money. Incidentally, the team had been organized by Bert Bell, the future NFL commissioner and Philadelphia Eagles owner, but Bell had planned to play the team as the "Philadelphia Collegians" before Phoenixville's managers came and signed all of Bell's players.

The Phoenixville club went 11-0 in 1920. The team defeated several local teams, including their rivals, the Conshohocken Athletic Club, Holmesburg Athletic Club, and the pre-NFL Frankford Yellow Jackets. However, the team still had the biggest game of the year, and in team history, to play.

==== The Canton Bulldogs game ====
At the end of the 1920 season, Phoenixville fans began to wonder how their team stacked up to the best teams of the era. Prior to 1920, the Canton Bulldogs were considered the best pro football team in world. The team featured Joe Guyon and the legendary Jim Thorpe, both future Pro Football Hall of Famers. The team was also not only a member of the mythical Ohio League, which consisted of the best teams in pro football, but won the league's championship in 1916, 1917 and 1919.

On December 11, an estimated 17,000 fans turned out to watch the Union Club and Canton Bulldogs play at the Baker Bowl. Despite the Bulldogs scoring first off of a Pete Calac touchdown, the Phoenixville soon gained control of the game with a fumble recovery by Heinie Miller. That play set up a Stan Cofall touchdown pass to Lou Hayes. Later in the third quarter, Cofall blocked a Guyon punt which was returned for another touchdown by Hayes. While Canton did manage a late game drive to the Phoenixville 20 yard line, a Guyon fumble, was recovered by Phoenxiville's Heinie Miller. Phoenixville won the game 13–7.

Despite their victory, the Union Club could not claim any national professional championship based upon the outcome of the Canton game. The 1920 Canton Bulldogs were just not the dominant football team that they had been in previous seasons. In the NFL, the Akron Pros, Decatur Staleys (renamed the Chicago Bears in 1922) and the Buffalo All-Americans had all placed higher ahead of the Bulldogs in the standings. Leo Conway appeared at the NFL's organizational meetings in April 1921, representing Phoenixville, where the league's championship was awarded to Akron by a vote.

=== 1921 and closure ===
In 1921, the Union Club's status as a premier professional team disappeared. The club's board of directors rejected Heinie Miller's proposal to for the team to reform with a similar 1920 lineup for the 1921 season. The club instead opted to field a less costly team of mostly local talent. The Big Red went on to a 5–2 record in what turned out to be its final season. However Miller, managed to keep most of the 1920 team intact and fielded them in 1921 as the Union Quakers of Philadelphia in 1921.
