= Holmesburg Athletic Club =

General information
- Founded: c. 1915
- Folded: 1923; 103 years ago
- Stadium: Crystal Field
- Headquartered: Philadelphia, Pennsylvania
- Colors: Red, White

Personnel
- General manager: Fred Gerker
- Head coach: Henry Eavis

Team history
- Holmesburg Athletic Club (c1915-23)

League / conference affiliations
- Independent

The Holmesburg Athletic Club was a professional football team from Philadelphia, Pennsylvania, United States, that was in existence from around 1915 until 1923. The team laid claim to the Philadelphia City Championship in 1919 and 1920.

== Alumni ==
The 1915 Holmesburg lineup featured Lou Little, a college All-American from Penn. Little, at the time a freshman at Penn, played under the assumed name of "Lou Small" to protect his collegiate status. He later went on to play for the Buffalo All-Americans of the National Football League, the Union Club of Phoenixville, the Union Quakers of Philadelphia and the pre-NFL version of the Frankford Yellow Jackets before going on to a highly successful coaching career at both Georgetown and Columbia.

Bert Yeabsley, a pinch hitter for the Philadelphia Phillies, and John B. Kelly Sr., a three time Olympic gold medalist for sculling, played for the team in 1919. In 1921, Benny Boynton briefly played for Holmesburg for Thanksgiving Day game against the Union Quakers of Philadelphia. Stan Cofall also played for the team over its life span.
