= Philadelphia Quakers =

Philadelphia Quakers may refer to:

- Members of Philadelphia Yearly Meeting of the Religious Society of Friends (Quakers).
- Philadelphia Phillies, an American baseball team originally known as the Philadelphia Quakers
- Union Quakers of Philadelphia, a defunct American football team which played as an independent for one season (1921)
- Philadelphia Quakers (AFL), a defunct American football team which played in the first AFL for one season (1926)
- Philadelphia Quakers (NHL), a defunct American ice hockey team which played in the NHL for one season (1930–31)
- Philadelphia Quakers/Athletics (PL/AA), a defunct American baseball team which played in the PL and the AA in the early 1890s
