= Butch Spagna =

American football player (1897–1948)

Profile
- Positions: Guard, Tackle

Personal information
- Born: May 15, 1897; New York, New York, U.S.
- Died: December 11, 1948 (aged 51); Philadelphia, Pennsylvania, U.S.
- Listed height: 6 ft 0 in (1.83 m)
- Listed weight: 215 lb (98 kg)

Career information
- College: Brown, Lehigh

Career history
- 1919: Phoenix Athletic Club
- 1920: Union Club of Phoenixville
- 1920: Buffalo All-Americans
- 1920: Chicago Tigers
- 1921: Buffalo All-Americans
- 1921: Union Quakers of Philadelphia
- 1922–1925: Frankford Yellow Jackets
- 1926: Philadelphia Quakers

Awards and highlights
- AFL champion (1926)

Joseph "Butch" Spagna (May 15, 1897 – December 11, 1948) was a professional football player during the 1920s.

== NFL and AFL experience ==
He played in the early National Football League (called the American Professional Football Association until 1922) for the Buffalo All-Americans, Cleveland Tigers and the Frankford Yellow Jackets. He also played in the first American Football League for the Philadelphia Quakers in 1926.

== Independent football ==
Aside from playing in the NFL, Butch also played for several independent teams. In 1919, he began his professional football career with the Phoenix Athletic Club, who later became the Union Club of Phoenixville in 1920. He would play a non-league game with Phoenixville on Saturdays, then hopped the train for Buffalo and the next day's game. This arrangement helped the Spagna, and several other Buffalo All-Americans players, earn extra money in between league games. In 1921 he also moonlighted as a player for the Union Quakers of Philadelphia, while still playing for Buffalo. Spagna also claimed that during his college days at Lehigh, he would play for Lehigh on Saturday afternoon, then board a train for Philadelphia. There he would play in a Sunday professional game, assuming the cover-identity of "Joby Riba, Heap Big Indian," which did not require him to speak English.

== College football ==
Prior to playing pro football, Spagna played at the college level while attending Brown and Lehigh University.
