= Bodie Weldon =

American football player (1895–1928)

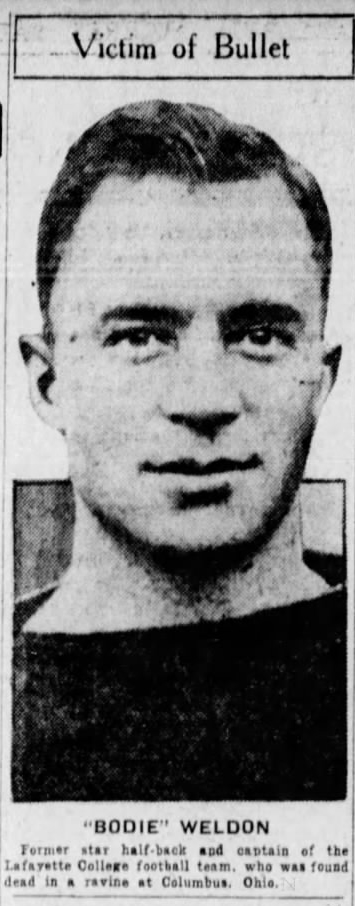
- Portrait of football player Bodie Weldon

Profile
- Positions: Wingback, Tailback, Halfback

Personal information
- Born: November 7, 1895; Watertown, New York
- Died: May 25, 1928 (aged 32); Columbus, Ohio
- Listed height: 5 ft 7 in (1.70 m)
- Listed weight: 165 lb (75 kg)

Career information
- College: Lafayette College

Career history
- Phoenix Athletic Club (1919); Union Club of Phoenixville (1920); Buffalo All-Americans (1920)
- Stats at Pro Football Reference

John Ambrose "Bodie" Weldon (November 7, 1895 – May 25, 1928) was a professional football player during the 1920s. He played in the American Professional Football Association (renamed the National Football League in 1922) for the Buffalo All-Americans. Weldon was instrumental in the first NFL game to take place in New York City, as Buffalo defeated the Canton Bulldogs 7–3 at the Polo Grounds. During the game Weldon punted against the legendary Jim Thorpe and kicked a point after touchdown.

However Weldon also played independent football for the Phoenix Athletic Club in 1919 and Union Club of Phoenixville in 1921. He would play a non-league game with Phoenixville on Saturdays, then take a train to Buffalo for the next day's game. This arrangement helped Weldon, and several other Buffalo All-Americans players, earn extra money in between league games.

Prior to playing pro football, Weldon played at the college level for Lafayette College. He received a college letter in 1916. He was chosen to be the team captain before the 1918 season, but he left school to serve in World War I. After returning from the war, he was the captain of the 1919 team, and graduated in 1920. While at Lafayette, he also played on the school's basketball team, as a guard, and on the baseball team as an outfielder.

On May 25, 1928, Weldon was found dead in Columbus, Ohio, with a bullet hole in his head. He was believed to have committed suicide by shooting himself.
