= Pard Pearce =

American football player (1896–1974)

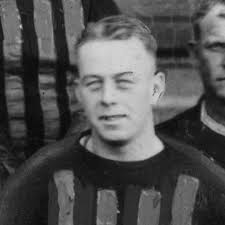
- Pearce in 1920

No. 4, 10
- Position: Quarterback

Personal information
- Born: October 23, 1896; Providence, Rhode Island, U.S.
- Died: May 24, 1974 (aged 77); Newport, Rhode Island, U.S.
- Listed height: 5 ft 5 in (1.65 m)
- Listed weight: 150 lb (68 kg)

Career information
- High school: Providence (RI) Classical
- College: Penn

Career history
- Decatur Staleys / Chicago Staleys / Chicago Bears (1920–1922); Kenosha Maroons (1924); Providence Steam Roller (1925)
- Stats at Pro Football Reference

Walter Irving "Pard" Pearce (October 23, 1896 – May 24, 1974) was an American professional football player who played quarterback for six seasons for the Decatur Staleys, Chicago Staleys, Chicago Bears, Kenosha Maroons, and Providence Steam Roller. Pearce was the first starting quarterback for the Bears in team history, and is the shortest player in NFL history to record a touchdown pass.

== Early life and education ==
Walter Pearce, nicknamed "Pard," was born in 1896, the son of real estate broker Walter Irvin Pearce, Sr. After his father’s death, Pearce attended Classical High School in Providence, Rhode Island, where he played football, hockey, and baseball. In the fall of 1917, he enrolled at the Wharton School of the University of Pennsylvania and played on the freshman baseball team in 1918. During World War I, Pearce worked at the Hog Island shipyard in Philadelphia before being inducted into the U.S. Navy on July 27, 1918. He was discharged in January 1919.

== Minor league baseball career ==
In 1919, Pearce sought an opportunity in baseball and joined the Rockford Rox of the Three-I League under the pseudonym "Dwyer" to preserve his college athletic eligibility. Despite receiving interest from the Chicago Cubs, who invited him to spring training in 1920, Pearce never played for the team. He returned to Rockford and played 129 games for the Rox. He then joined George Halas's Staley baseball team, which led to his entry into professional football.

Pearce re-enrolled at the University of Pennsylvania in the fall of 1919 and played as a halfback for the varsity football team. However, just before Thanksgiving, he was declared ineligible after it was revealed he had been paid for playing baseball earlier that year. This led to his ban from future collegiate sports, causing Pearce to drop out of Penn.

== Professional football career ==
After leaving college, Pearce became the starting quarterback for the Decatur Staleys (later the Chicago Bears) during the 1920 season, the inaugural season of what would become the National Football League. At five feet, five inches tall and weighing only 150 pounds, he started all 13 games and earned more than $1,400 in bonuses in addition to his salary from the Staley factory. Pearce returned to the team in 1921, when the Staleys relocated to Chicago and won the American Professional Football Association championship.

In 1922, Pearce became a backup quarterback to Joey Sternaman on the newly renamed Chicago Bears. He played two more seasons of professional football, finishing his career with the Kenosha Maroons in 1924 and the Providence Steam Roller in 1925.

== Coaching and later life ==
After retiring from professional sports, Pearce became a teacher and coach. He coached football and baseball at Pawtucket East High School in Rhode Island during the 1930s, later becoming a physical education teacher in North Attleboro, Massachusetts. In 1944, he began coaching and teaching at Providence Central High School, a position he held until his retirement in 1965. He also served as the school's fencing coach.

Pearce was an active sports official, serving as president of the Rhode Island Football Officials organization. In 1965, he was awarded the association’s trophy for his service to Rhode Island youth football. He officiated football until the age of 77 and continued to umpire baseball games until his death.

== Death ==
On May 24, 1974, Pearce collapsed while umpiring a high school baseball game in Providence, Rhode Island. He later died the same day in Newport Hospital in Newport, Rhode Island.
