= Lenny Sachs =

American football player and coach (1897–1942)

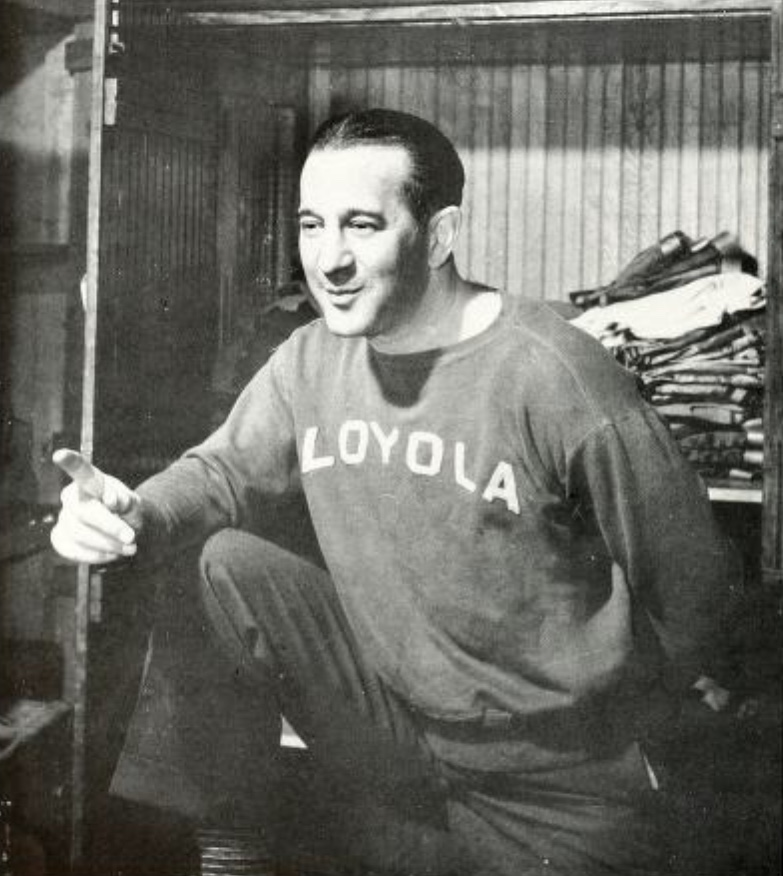
- Sachs from the 1938 Loyolan

Profile
- Position: End

Personal information
- Born: August 7, 1897; Chicago, Illinois, U.S.
- Died: October 27, 1942 (aged 45); Chicago, Illinois, U.S.
- Listed height: 5 ft 8 in (1.73 m)
- Listed weight: 176 lb (80 kg)

Career information
- High school: Carl Schurz High School
- College: American College of Physical Education (BA/BS); Loyola (ILL) (MA/MS)

Career history

Playing
- 1920–1922: Chicago Cardinals
- 1923–1924: Milwaukee Badgers
- 1924–1925: Hammond Pros
- 1925: Chicago Cardinals
- 1926: Louisville Colonels

Coaching
- 1926: Louisville Colonels

Awards and highlights
- NFL champion (1925)
- Coaching profile at Pro Football Reference

Other information
- Military career
- Allegiance: United States
- Branch: U.S. Navy
- Service years: 1917–1919
- Conflicts: World War I

Leonard David Sachs (August 7, 1897 – October 27, 1942) was an American basketball and football coach and player. In 1961, he was posthumously enshrined as a coach in the Basketball Hall of Fame.

He was born in Chicago, Illinois on August 7, 1897. Sachs attended Carl Schurz High School in Chicago, where he earned 11 varsity letters before his graduation in 1914. Upon graduation from high school, Sachs joined the United States Navy during World War I, where he continued playing sports, earning an All-Service team honorable mention in football in 1918 while playing on the Cleveland Naval Reserves football team.

After the war, Sachs enrolled at Chicago's American College of Physical Education—which later merged with DePaul University—and graduated in 1923. While at college, Sachs played for the Chicago Cardinals in the National Football League (NFL) from 1920 to 1922.

Sachs was hired as basketball coach in 1923 at Loyola University Chicago, even while continuing his NFL career. From 1923 to 1926 Sachs played for the Milwaukee Badgers, Hammond Pros, and Louisville Colonels, ending his career as a player-coach for the 1926 Louisville Colonels, a road-only team based in Chicago. Sachs was also an assistant football coach at Loyola on the staff of head coach Roger Kiley.

After abandoning his NFL career, Sachs began to flourish as a basketball coach. In the 1926–27 season, the Loyola basketball team improved to 13–4. In 1927–28, the team set a new Loyola record for wins in a season by earning a record of 16–4. And in 1928–29, Loyola was a perfect 16-0 under Sachs' guidance. Loyola recorded 31 consecutive victories between 1928 and 1930.

In the 1930s, Sachs developed an innovative fast-break offense and a 2–2–1 zone defense that prompted a rule change in 1937 to prevent goaltending. His 1938–39 team was 21–0 before losing to 44–32 to Long Island University in the National Invitation Tournament final at Madison Square Garden.

On October 27, 1942, Sachs suffered a fatal heart attack while advising the Wendell Phillips High School football team for their appearance in the Chicago Public League championship. He was 45 years old.

Sachs amassed a record of 224–129 as a college basketball coach. In 1935 he earned a graduate degree from Loyola.
