= Jim Laird =

American football player and coach (1897–1970)

Profile
- Position: Running back

Personal information
- Born: September 10, 1897; Montpelier, Vermont, U.S.
- Died: August 16, 1970 (aged 72); Lebanon, Connecticut, U.S.
- Listed height: 6 ft 0 in (1.83 m)
- Listed weight: 194 lb (88 kg)

Career information
- High school: Holderness (NH)
- College: Colgate

Career history

Playing
- Rochester Jeffersons (1920); Buffalo All-Americans (1920–1921); Rochester Jeffersons (1921); Canton Bulldogs (1921); Union Quakers of Philadelphia (1921); Buffalo All-Americans (1922); Providence Steam Roller (1925–1928); Staten Island Stapletons (1931)

Coaching
- Norwich (1923–1925); Providence Steam Roller (1926); Norwich (1932–1934)

Awards and highlights
- NFL champion (1928); Second-team All-Pro (1922)
- Coaching profile at Pro Football Reference
- Stats at Pro Football Reference

James Tyler Laird (September 10, 1897 – August 16, 1970) was an American professional football player who was a running back for the Rochester Jeffersons, the Buffalo All-Americans, the Canton Bulldogs, the Providence Steam Rollers, and the Staten Island Stapletons. In 1926, he was a player-coach for the Providence Steam Rollers. Laird was also a coach for Norwich University in Northfield, Vermont. In 1921 Laird played for the New York Brickley Giants, however he is not listed as being on the team as he played for the Giants only when they played non-league opponents. He also played for the independent Union Quakers of Philadelphia in 1921.

Laird had a son, also named James Tyler Laird, who was the chair of the psychology department at St. John's University in Collegeville, Minnesota.
