= Kenosha Maroons =

American football team

General information
- Founded: September 16, 1924
- Folded: 1924
- Stadium: Nash Field
- Headquartered: Kenosha, Wisconsin, United States
- Colors: Maroon, white

Personnel
- Owner: City of Kenosha
- General manager: George Johnson
- Head coach: Earl Potteiger & Bo Hanley

Team history
- Kenosha Maroons (1924)

League / conference affiliations
- National Football League

The Kenosha Maroons were a National Football League football team in Kenosha, Wisconsin. Officially, the club only played in the league during the 1924 season, dissolving after posting no wins in five games.

== History ==
=== Origins ===
Prior to the 1924 season, the NFL ordered the Toledo Maroons, based in Toledo, Ohio to either transfer or suspend operations. Then on September 16, 1924, the Kenosha Evening News reported that the City of Kenosha agreed to purchase the Toledo franchise. However no conclusive evidence exists that the Toledo franchise was officially transferred to Kenosha.

Kenosha felt that the team would be successful under the direction of George Johnson, an umpire in the Midwest Baseball League. Johnson began scouting for talent to stock the new club. Financial support was offered by the Nash and Simmons companies, long-time sponsors of local athletic teams.

Johnson soon signed Marv Wood, a 195-pound fullback from the University of California, and Walt Cassidy, a wide receiver and 1923 graduate of the University of Detroit. Others on the official roster were quarterback Jimmy Simpson, also out of the University of Detroit; running back George Seasholtz from Lafayette College; and Clete Patterson, an offensive guard from Ohio University. There were wide receiver Dick Stahlman of DePaul University; running back Dick Vick and offensive tackle Ray Oberbroekling from Loras College. One of the most popular players was Earl Potteiger, a running back. He was well known in Kenosha as a baseball player for the Simmons and Nash teams in previous years. Potteiger would go on to coach the championship New York Giants three years later. Bo Hanley was named coach of the Maroons.

=== 1924 season ===
On October 3, 1924, the Maroons played their first game of the season against the Frankford Yellow Jackets. They lost the game 31–6. Despite the loss, hopes were high for the team's second game, against the Milwaukee Badgers. However, the result was a 21–0 defeat.

The big game and the home opener, which became the only game the professional Maroons would ever play in Kenosha, was scheduled for Sunday October 19, 1924 against the Hammond Pros. Newspaper reports state that the weather was perfect, and remained warm during the first half of the Maroons-Pros contest which ended in scoreless tie. However, the wind shifted and a sharp breeze cooled off the thousand or so spectators at Nash Field. On the gridiron things heated up. Capping a third quarter drive, fullback Seasholtz hurtled over the goal for a Maroon touchdown. He missed the conversion kick. However, the Pros came back to score with a minute left in the game. Maroons' tackle Fritz Heinisch, a Racine native, blocked the extra point try to preserve the final tie which was considered almost a moral victory for the underdog home team.

The game drew about 600 spectators in attendance, which was considerably less than a victory since other NFL teams, like the Green Bay Packers, who could draw 5,000 hometown fans to a game.

Injuries in the Hammond game were costly. Usher broke his nose, Simpson injured his neck, and Potteiger suffered a broken arm that finished him for the season. From that point, it was all downhill for the Maroons.

On October 26, 1924, the team played a strong Duluth Kelleys team. With a powerful running attack, mixed with passes, the Kelleys wiped out the Kenoshans, 32–0. The Maroons failed to make a first down all afternoon. A game with the Waukegan Elks of the lesser Midwest League was scheduled for November 2. At the last minute, however, the Illinois team cancelled out. Some claimed that Midwest officials pressured Waukegan not to play outside its league. When manager Johnson was unable to schedule a replacement game, November 2 became an open date.

Citing the missed game and the poor local attendance at the Hammond contest, a Racine sportswriter claimed pro football in Kenosha was "a flop" and predicted the Maroons would not finish the season. A Maroons spokesman dismissed the accusations and announced the team would travel to Buffalo, New York the following weekend to play the Buffalo Bisons. But there was uncertainty in the air as Johnson announced that there would be a big announcement after the Buffalo game.

At Buffalo, the Maroons lost 27–0 to the Bisons. Ten Days later the "high-priced" Maroons players were released from their contracts and the original team disbanded. In a startling development, the local financial backers announced they were keeping the franchise and had bought the winning, but financially troubled, Duluth Kelleys. The Duluth players were to simply switch jerseys and become the new Kenosha Maroons. The Kelleys were tied for fourth place in the league with the Packers and the Chicago Cardinals.

On Thanksgiving Day 1924 a game between the new Maroons and the Racine Horlick-Legion was announced, as was another, just three days later, on November 30, 1924, with the NFL's Kansas City Cowboys. However neither game was played. The Kelleys went back to Duluth to play several more years. For Kenosha the season ended dismally with a 0–4–1 record. The Maroons tied with the winless Minneapolis Marines and the Rochester Jeffersons for last place in the NFL.

=== Aftermath ===
The final chapter of the Maroons history is missing from the sports pages of the local paper. There were no announcements of the cancellation of the final two games and it went unreported that the franchise had been lost. However an error in the NFL records, which persists today, shows that the Maroons lost a fifth game that season to the Rock Island Independents. That phantom game, claimed as a victory by Rock Island, appears incorrectly in NFL records as the Kenosha team's fifth loss of its only season. In reality, this game was held after the "high-priced" Maroons players and the rest of the original team disbanded, and the team that played Rock Island was instead composed of "Kenosha All-Stars".

== Season-by-season ==
Year	W	L	T	Finish	Coaches
1924	0	4	1	16th	Earl Potteiger, Bo Hanley

== See also ==
- Toledo Maroons
- List of Kenosha Maroons players
