= Aaron Hertzman =

American football executive (1891–1970)

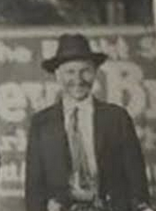

Personal information
- Born: October 16, 1891; Louisville, Kentucky, U.S.
- Died: August 16, 1970 (aged 78); Louisville, Kentucky, U.S.
- Listed height: 5 ft 4 in (1.63 m)
- Listed weight: 126 lb (57 kg)

Career information
- High school: none
- College: none

Career history
- Louisville Brecks (1921–1924) Owner / general manager; Louisville Colonels (1926) Owner

Aaron Hertzman (October 16, 1891 – August 16, 1970) was an American professional football executive. He was the owner of the Louisville team of the National Football League (NFL), known as the Brecks from the 1921 though 1923 seasons and as the Colonels in 1926. He also served as the general manager of the team when they were the Brecks.

== Early life ==
Hertzman was born on October 16, 1891, in Louisville, Kentucky, the son of Russian-Jewish immigrants. He grew up in Louisville but did not attend high school or college, with his highest education being eighth grade. He was working as a stenographer for a printing company as of 1910. He served in World War I in the medical corps at Camp Henry Knox; he had five brothers who also served in the war. Hertzman later worked as a bookkeeper for the American Cap Manufacturing Company, a business owned by his father, rising up to vice president by 1923.

== Executive career ==
Hertzman had no known experience in football prior to 1921; The Coffin Corner, the publication of the Professional Football Researchers Association, noted that "There is no record of Hertzman having played ... at this time as some managers did, or whether he played the game during his stay in the Army. Perhaps he made connections in the military that brought him in touch with league organizers, or maybe his father, Jacob, had made contacts on one of his many business trips in the years before the war."

That year, Hertzman owned the Breckenridge Athletic Club football team of Louisville and applied to be a member of the American Professional Football Association (APFA) – now known as the National Football League (NFL). The fee to enter the league cost $25; The Coffin Corner stated that Hertzman "had no grand dream of Louisville becoming a football powerhouse", that his goals were only to make a profit from his investment and to draw name talent to the city. The NFL received the entrance fee but Louisville did not attend the annual league meeting in April; they nonetheless were admitted into the league, with league president Joseph Carr liking the thought of having a team in a city with a baseball tradition.

Hertzman served as both the owner and the general manager of the team, which played under the name of Louisville Breckenridges, or Brecks, for short. The team, based in Eclipse Park, compiled a record of 0–2 in league play in their first season, finishing 18 out of 21 teams; however, including non-APFA opponents, the Brecks went 4–4–1. The following season, the 16-player squad assembled by Hertzman went 1–3 in the newly renamed NFL for a 13th-place finish; with a record of 3–4–1 overall. Louisville then recorded a mark of 0–3 in the NFL in 1923, being 19th out of 20 in the league standings while having an overall record of 5–4–1 including independent play. The team did not play in the NFL in 1924 and went 3–4–1 before folding.

In 1926, in order to compete with the newly formed American Football League (AFL), league president Carr decided to boost the number of NFL teams, which included reviving the Louisville team. Due to the burning down of the team's home field, Eclipse Park, they had no place to play and thus were re-organized in Chicago, Illinois, as a traveling team, under the name of Louisville Colonels. Hertzman returned as owner but Bill Harley, brother of Chic Harley, took over as general manager. Louisville did not score a single point, being outscored 108 to 0 while losing all four games and tying for last in the league; the team subsequently folded for a final time.

After Louisville folded, Hertzman was elected to the NFL as Sergeant of Arms. As an owner in the NFL, his record stood at 1–12, while he went 1–8 as a general manager. Despite his team's performance, he later noted in a letter to Leo Lyons the importance his and other teams played in the early league's development: "The majority of present owners know [nothing] of the hardships Joe Carr went through in finding new clubs each year, most of which only lasted one season – but they did contribute dues and assessments, which were essential to the continuance of the league until it finally got on its feet. The three or four or five games they filled in the schedules of the ruling clubs enabled the league to keep going."

== Later life ==
Hertzman later became the president of the American Cap Manufacturing Company. He also worked as a manager at the Berkeley Hotel and was the secretary of the Radcliffe Company. At age 50 in 1942, he enlisted in World War II. He continued to attend NFL meetings until c. 1960. Hertzman never married. He died on August 16, 1970, at the Jewish Hospital in Louisville, aged 78.
