= Walt Cassidy =

American football player (1901–1944)

Profile
- Position: End

Personal information
- Born: January 3, 1901; Youngstown, Ohio, U.S.
- Died: December 28, 1944 (aged 43); English Channel
- Listed height: 5 ft 10 in (1.78 m)
- Listed weight: 200 lb (91 kg)

Career information
- College: Detroit Mercy

Career history
- Kenosha Maroons (1924)

Career NFL statistics
- Games played: 5
- Stats at Pro Football Reference

Walter Charles Cassidy (January 31, 1901 – December 27, 1944) was a player in the National Football League. He played with the Kenosha Maroons during the 1924 NFL season.

Cassidy enlisted in the Army in Toledo on July 27, 1942. He joined the Army Air Forces and rose to the rank of staff sergeant. On December 27, 1944, Cassidy was one of three fatalities aboard a Douglas C-47 Skytrain when it crashed into the English Channel.
