= George Seasholtz =

American football player (1900–1945)

Profile
- Position: Fullback

Personal information
- Born: November 14, 1900; Pottstown, Pennsylvania, U.S.
- Died: April 11, 1945 (aged 44); Pottstown, Pennsylvania, U.S.
- Listed height: 5 ft 8 in (1.73 m)
- Listed weight: 185 lb (84 kg)

Career information
- College: Lafayette

Career history
- Milwaukee Badgers (1922); Kenosha Maroons (1924)

Career statistics
- Touchdowns: 1
- Stats at Pro Football Reference

George Donald Seasholtz (November 14, 1900 – April 11, 1945) was a fullback in the National Football League (NFL). He first played with the Milwaukee Badgers during the 1922 NFL season. After a year away from the NFL, he played with the Kenosha Maroons during the 1924 NFL season.

After retiring from football, Seaholtz was the manager of two theaters and was later the junior varsity baseball coach at Chambersburg High School.
