= Earl Potteiger =

American athlete and coach (1893–1959)

No. 4, 3, 9
- Position: Halfback

Personal information
- Born: February 11, 1893; Pottstown, Pennsylvania, U.S.
- Died: April 7, 1959 (aged 68); Philadelphia, Pennsylvania, U.S.
- Listed height: 5 ft 7 in (1.70 m)
- Listed weight: 170 lb (77 kg)

Career information
- College: Ursinus; Albright

Career history

Playing
- 1914–1919: Conshohocken Athletic Club
- 1920: Union Club of Phoenixville
- 1920: Buffalo All-Americans
- 1921: Chicago Cardinals
- 1921: Frankford Yellow Jackets
- 1922: Milwaukee Badgers
- 1924: Kenosha Maroons
- 1925–1928: New York Giants

Coaching
- 1924: Kenosha Maroons
- 1927–1928: New York Giants

Awards and highlights
- NFL champion (1927)
- Coaching profile at Pro Football Reference
- Stats at Pro Football Reference

William Earl Potteiger (February 11, 1893 – April 7, 1959) was an American football, baseball, and basketball player and coach. He played professionally in both baseball and football and coached professionally in basketball, baseball and football. Potteiger was player-coach for the New York Giants when they won their first National Football League (NFL) championship in 1927. He also played minor league baseball from 1913 to 1917, in 1919, and from 1926 to 1927. He managed in the minors from 1926 to 1927 and in 1932.
