= Jimmy Simpson (American football) =

American football player (1897–1979)

Profile
- Position: Tailback

Personal information
- Born: July 29, 1899; Ontario, Canada
- Died: September 29, 1962 (aged 63)
- Listed height: 5 ft 10 in (1.78 m)
- Listed weight: 160 lb (73 kg)

Career information
- College: Detroit Mercy

Career history
- 1922: Toledo Maroons
- 1923: St. Louis All-Stars
- 1924: Kenosha Maroons

James Rothery Simpson (July 29, 1899 – September 29, 1962) was a blocking back in the National Football League (NFL). Simpson first played with the Toledo Maroons during the 1922 NFL season. The following season, he was a member of the St. Louis All-Stars, but did not see any playing time during a regular-season game. He played with the Kenosha Maroons during his final season after the Toledo Maroons made the move from Toledo, Ohio to Kenosha, Wisconsin.
