= Bert Yeabsley =

American baseball player (1893–1961)

- Pinch hitter/Pinch runner
- Born: December 17, 1893; Philadelphia, Pennsylvania, U.S.
- Died: February 8, 1961 (aged 67); Philadelphia, Pennsylvania, U.S.
- Batted: Right Threw: Right

MLB debut
- May 28, 1919, for the Philadelphia Phillies

Last MLB appearance
- June 10, 1919, for the Philadelphia Phillies

MLB statistics
- Games played: 3
- Plate appearances: 1
- Walks: 1
- Stats at Baseball Reference

Teams
- Philadelphia Phillies (1919)

Robert Watkins "Bert" Yeabsley (December 17, 1893 – February 8, 1961) was an American professional baseball player. Yeabsley played in Major League Baseball for Philadelphia Phillies in the 1919 season. He only played in three games in his one-year major league career, not having an at bat in any of them.

== Biography ==
Born in Philadelphia, Pennsylvania on December 17, 1893, Yeabsley played minor league baseball for the Raleigh Capitals as an outfielder in 1916. He made his major league debut on May 28, 1919. He pinch-hit for pitcher Elmer Jacobs in the 9th inning and drew a walk off Jimmy Ring of the Cincinnati Reds. Over the next two weeks, he appeared in two more games as a pinch runner, and never played professional baseball afterwards.

Yeabsley also played professional football from 1914 until 1919 for the Conshohocken Athletic Club. In 1919, he played football for the Holmesburg Athletic Club.

== Death ==
Yeabsley died in Philadelphia on February 8, 1961.
