= Austin Higgins =

American football player (1897–1976)

Profile
- Positions: Center, End

Personal information
- Born: November 29, 1897; Louisville, Kentucky, U.S.
- Died: March 3, 1976 (aged 78); Louisville, Kentucky, U.S.
- Listed height: 5 ft 9 in (1.75 m)
- Listed weight: 168 lb (76 kg)

Career information
- College: None

Career history
- Louisville Brecks (1921–1923)

Career statistics
- Games played: 7
- Games started: 7
- Stats at Pro Football Reference
- Coaching profile at Pro Football Reference

Austin George Higgins (November 29, 1897 – March 3, 1976) was an American football player and coach.

Higgins was born in 1897 in Louisville, Kentucky. He served in the Army during World War I from August 1917 to January 1919.

From 1921 to 1923, he played professional football, principally at the center position, for the Louisville Brecks in the National Football League (NFL). He appeared in at least seven NFL games, all of those as a starter. Higgins also served as the head coach for Louisville during the 1921 season. He earned a reputation as an ironman player who played entire games. The Courier-Journal later wrote that Higgins, who weighed as little as 155 pounds during his playing career, "didn't know what a substitute was and he never backed away from any of the bigger giants." He left the sport with a blood clot that remained on his left leg for 10 years.

Higgins was married in 1923 to Mary Spellman. After his football career ended, he worked for tobacco companies, including Phillip Morris Tobacco Co., Axton-Fischer Tobacco Co., and finally the Falls City Tobacco Company. He was also one of the top bowlers in Louisville. He died in 1978 at age 78.
