= Pete Calac =

American football player (1892–1968)

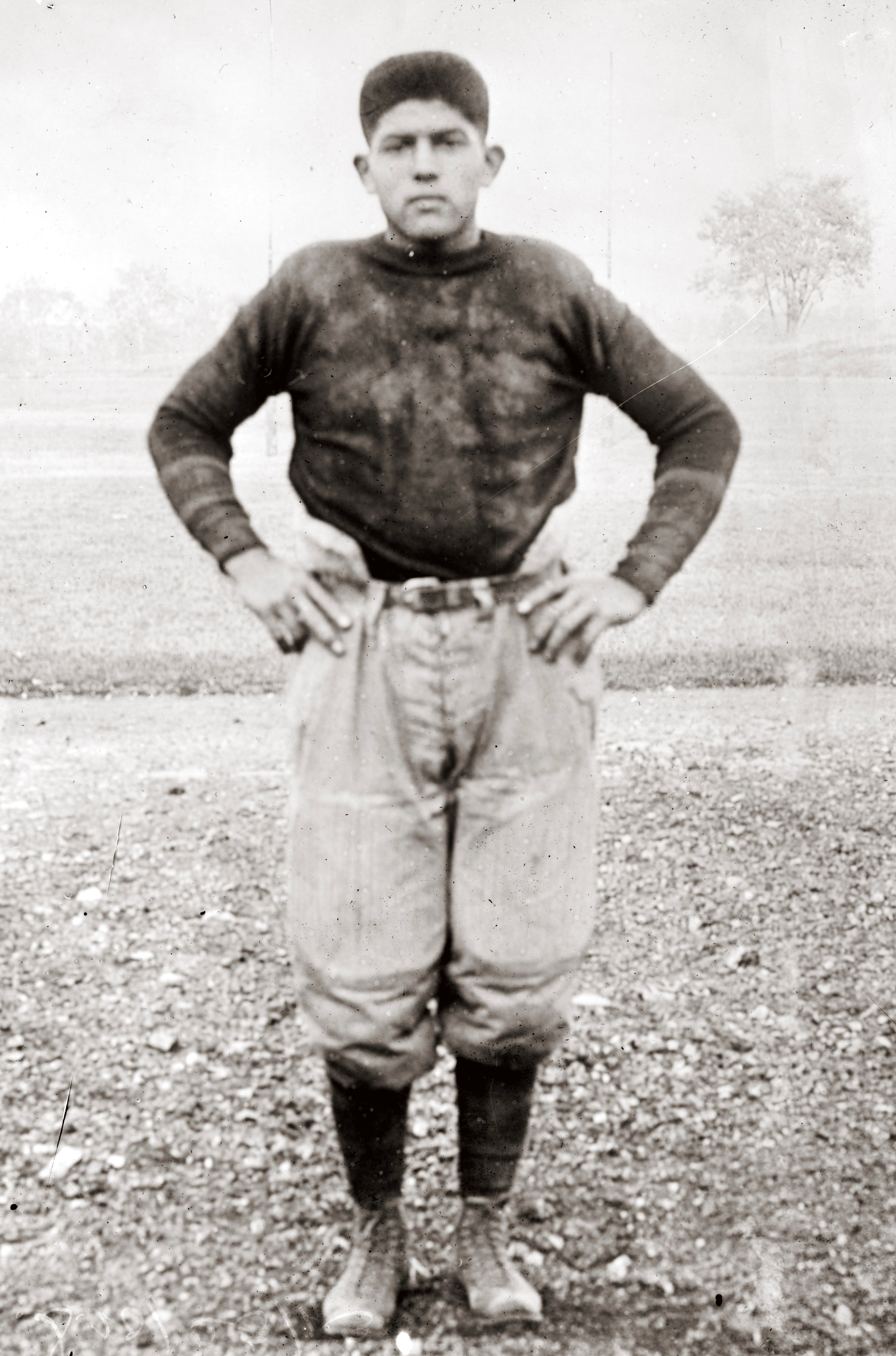

No. 4 (1922) 6 (1923)
- Positions: End, Wingback, Tailback, Fullback

Personal information
- Born: May 13, 1892; Valley Center, California, U.S.
- Died: January 30, 1968 (aged 75); Canton, Ohio, U.S.
- Listed height: 5 ft 10 in (1.78 m)
- Listed weight: 190 lb (86 kg)

Career information
- College: Carlisle; West Virginia Wesleyan

Career history
- 1916–1920: Canton Bulldogs (OL)/(NFL)
- 1921: Cleveland Indians (NFL)
- 1921: Union Quakers (Ind.)
- 1921: Washington Senators (NFL)
- 1922–1923: Oorang Indians (NFL)
- 1924: Buffalo Bisons (NFL)
- 1925–1926: Canton Bulldogs (NFL)

Awards and highlights
- 3× Ohio League champion (1916, 1917, 1919); Third-team All-Pro (1920); Philadelphia City champion (1921); Carlisle captain (1914–1915)

Other information
- Military career
- Allegiance: United States
- Branch: U.S. Army
- Unit: 91st Division
- Conflicts: World War I Western Front

Pedro "Pete" Calac (May 13, 1892 – January 30, 1968) was a professional football player who played in the Ohio League and during the early years of the National Football League (NFL). Over the course of his 10-year career he played for the Canton Bulldogs, Cleveland Indians, Washington Senators, Oorang Indians and the Buffalo Bisons.

== Biography ==
=== Early life ===
Calac was born on May 13, 1892, to Felicidad Calac and listed Francisco Calac as Pete's father on his enrollment at Carlisle. Some are confused since his grandfather was also named Francisco Calac but there were 3 Francisco Calacs on the census of Rincon at the time of his birth, all of Valley Center, California. Two of Pete's brothers had died of typhoid fever and he had a brother and two sisters living in 1908. A Mission Indian, he was born on a reservation and attended Sherman Indian School in Riverside, California. He ran from Sherman home to the reservation two consecutive years. The third year he was taken to Riverside and put on a train to Carlisle Indian School.

=== Carlisle Indian School ===
Calac came to the Carlisle Indian School located across the country in Carlisle, Pennsylvania on November 16, 1908, at the age of 15. He came to the school via the Union Pacific Railroad with only a third-grade education. Calac left Carlisle in June 1911 and returned to California. He asked to return to Carlisle and was re-enrolled September 22, 1912. At the school, he played competitive football. In 1914 and 1915, he was captain of the football team. He was first elected as the team's captain in 1914 when the team's current captain, Elmer Busch, was forced to resign. Until attending the school, Calac had never played football before and had no knowledge of the game. Calac recalled in Robert W. Wheeler's book, Jim Thorpe: World's Greatest Athlete, that the other players took an interest in him because of his large size. It was then that Jim Thorpe, who would later be recognized as being one of the top athletes of the 20th Century, took him as an acolyte. Thorpe and Calac soon became friends and would later play professional football with the Canton Bulldogs and the Oorang Indians.

=== US Army ===
After attending West Virginia Wesleyan, Pete returned to California for a visit to family and tribe and enlisted in the Army. He served with the 91st Division, known as the "Wild West Division," in France and Belgium during World War I. He returned from the war without a wound. He later stated that "I guess I dug in too much". However, in an article by the Professional Football Researchers Association, Calac was reported to have suffered career threatening wounds during the war but was back at the top of his game by 1922.

== Football career ==
=== Canton Bulldogs ===
In 1916 with Calac and former Carlisle teammate Jim Thorpe starring, Canton went 9–0–1, won the Ohio League championship, and was acclaimed the pro football champion. The Bulldogs had a repeat of their 1916 season, by winning the 1917 Ohio League championship. Then in 1919 Thorpe and Calac were joined in the backfield by future Hall of Famer Joe Guyon and won their third Ohio League Championship.

=== Union Quakers ===
Calac and Guyon joined the backfield of the Union Quakers over the 1921 Thanksgiving weekend for the games against the Conshohocken Athletic Club and the pre-NFL version of the Frankford Yellow Jackets. The 1921 Quakers team won the Philadelphia City Championship.

=== Washington Senators ===
The Washington Senators franchise spent only one season in the NFL. Once the team left the league at the end of the 1921 season, only three of the team's players would play in the NFL following the very next season. Those players were Benny Boynton, Guyon and Calac.

=== Oorang Indians ===
In the winter of 1921, Walter Lingo, an Airedale terrier breeder, brought Thorpe and Calac, to his plantation in LaRue, Ohio to hunt for possum. During that meeting, Lingo decided to purchase a franchise in the National Football League. Called the Oorang Indians. The team was composed only of Native Americans and was mostly used as tool to for Lingo to promote his Airedales. The team was not considered to be very good, despite having two future Hall of Famers in the lineup. Lingo was more interested in selling his dogs instead of quality football. As a result, the Indians became more of a novelty act, known for their halftime shows instead of a football team. Calac played the team's halfback for both years of the Indians existence.

=== Buffalo Bisons ===
After the Indians folded in 1923. Calac was left in need of a team. He was scooped up by the Buffalo Bisons, who were previously known as the Buffalo All-Americans. The team was sold to a group led by local businessman Warren D. Patterson and Tommy Hughitt, the team's quarterback, for $50,000. The new owners changed the name of the team to Bisons, and committed themselves to signing big name players in an effort to improve performance both on the field and in attendance. As part of this big name spending spree, Calac was offered a contract to serve as the team's fullback. The combination of Hughitt, Boynton, Eddie Kaw, and Calac gave Buffalo the most potent offensive backfield in the league. In a 13–0 opening day victory over the Columbus Panhandles, managed by future NFL President Joe Carr, Calac was knocked out of the game with a broken nose.

While with the Bisons, the team had to travel to Philadelphia for a game against the Frankford Yellow Jackets. Philadelphia, being a large metropolitan area, was unfamiliar territory for several of the rural players. That night several players including Calac and rookie Jim Ailinger (best known as being the last surviving player from the NFL's early era) went out to a restaurant for dinner. According to Ailinger, he was unfamiliar with what to order in a restaurant, so he sat right next to Calac, who was a veteran player. The waiter asked Pete what he wanted and he said, "A lot of meat and a lot of potatoes."

== Family ==
Pete and his wife were reported to have been married since 1924. They had a son, 2 daughters and 7 grandchildren. Their son, following in Pete's footsteps, played high school football in Canton. Afterwards he became a member of the police force. According to his obituary, Pete Calac died on January 30, 1968.

== Legacy ==
Grantland Rice, Dean of American Sportswriters, once wrote, "I believe an All-American, All-Indian Football team could beat the All-Time Notre Dame Team, the All-Time Michigan Team, or the All-Time anything else. Take a look at a backfield like Jim Thorpe, Joe Guyon, Pete Calac and Frank Mount Pleasant."
