= Bo Hanley =

American football player and coach (1891–1954)

Profile
- Position: Wingback

Personal information
- Born: July 10, 1891; U.S.
- Died: November 23, 1954 (aged 63); Milwaukee, Wisconsin, U.S.
- Listed height: 5 ft 7 in (1.70 m)
- Listed weight: 150 lb (68 kg)

Career information
- College: Marquette

Career history
- 1914–1915: Colorado Mines
- 1924: Kenosha Maroons
- Coaching profile at Pro Football Reference

William Joseph "Bo" Hanley (July 10, 1891 – November 23, 1954) was an American football player and coach. He served a head coach for the Kenosha Maroons of the National Football League (NFL) for one season in 1924. Hanley played college football at Marquette University, where he was nicknamed the "Marquette Marvel". In 1911, Hanley played baseball for one season for the Aurora Blues of the Wisconsin-Illinois League.

In 1920, Hanley's younger brother, Cornelius "Pat" Hanley played for the Detroit Heralds. Pat also played college football at Marquette.

== Biography ==
Hanley was born on July 10, 1891. He was a resident physical at County Emergency Hospital in Milwaukee for 16 years, until he died there, on November 23, 1954.

== Coaching ==
Hanley served as the head football coach at the Colorado School of Mines in Golden, Colorado from 1914 to 1915.

== Head coaching record ==
=== College ===
Year	Team	Overall	Conference	Standing	Bowl/playoffs
Colorado Mines Orediggers (Rocky Mountain Conference) (1914–1915)
1914	Colorado Mines	5–0–1	5–0–1	1st	
1915	Colorado Mines	4–2	4–2	T–3rd	
Colorado Mines:		9–2–1	9–2–1		
Total:		9–2–1			
National championship Conference title Conference division title or championship game berth
