= Fritz Heinisch =

American football player (1900–1983)

Profile
- Position: End

Personal information
- Born: June 22, 1900; Racine, Wisconsin
- Died: December 22, 1983 (aged 83); Mount Pleasant, Wisconsin
- Listed height: 5 ft 10 in (1.78 m)
- Listed weight: 173 lb (78 kg)

Career history
- Racine Legion (1922–1923); Kenosha Maroons (1924); Racine Tornadoes (1926); Duluth Eskimos (1926)

Career NFL statistics
- Games played: 18
- Games started: 4
- Stats at Pro Football Reference

Godfred F. "Fritz" Heinisch (June 22, 1900 – December 22, 1983) was an American football end in the National Football League Born in Racine, Wisconsin., Heinisch played for the Racine Legion/Tornadoes (1922–1923, 1926), the Kenosha Maroons (1924), and the Duluth Eskimos (1926).
