= Marv Wood =

American football player (1900–1973)

Profile
- Position: Wingback / Fullback / End

Personal information
- Born: November 28, 1900; Borden, Indiana, U.S.
- Died: December 18, 1973 (aged 73); Bloomington, Indiana, U.S.
- Listed height: 6 ft 1 in (1.85 m)
- Listed weight: 195 lb (88 kg)

Career information
- College: California

Career history
- Kenosha Maroons (1924)

Career statistics
- Games played: 4
- Stats at Pro Football Reference

Marvin Wood (November 28, 1900 – December 18, 1973) was an American football player in the National Football League. He played with the Kenosha Maroons during the 1924 NFL season.
