= Heinie Miller =

American football player and coach (1893–1964)

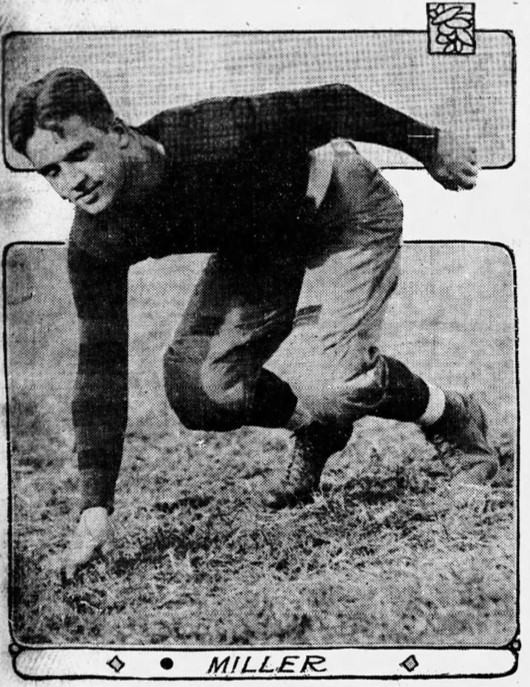

Profile
- Positions: Guard, end

Personal information
- Born: January 1, 1893; Williamsport, Pennsylvania, U.S.
- Died: June 9, 1964 (aged 71); Longport, New Jersey, U.S.
- Listed height: 5 ft 10 in (1.78 m)
- Listed weight: 185 lb (84 kg)

Career information
- College: Penn

Career history

Playing
- 1920: Union Club of Phoenixville
- 1920–1921: Buffalo All-Americans
- 1921: Union AA of Philadelphia
- 1922–1924: Frankford Yellow Jackets
- 1925: Milwaukee Badgers

Coaching
- 1920–1922: Saint Joseph's Prep (PA)
- 1923: Saint Joseph's
- 1925–1932: Temple
- 1934–1939: Saint Joseph's
- 1942: West Chester

Awards and highlights
- 2× Consensus All-American (1917, 1919); Second-team All-American (1916)

Henry John "Heinie" Miller (January 1, 1893 – June 9, 1964) was an American football player and coach from 1920 to 1942. He played in The National Football League (NFL) for the Buffalo All-Americans and the Milwaukee Badgers.

== Biography ==
Miller played for the University of Pennsylvania football team and switched positions from tight end to fullback in 1915. Miller also played for the Union Club of Phoenixville, and its later incarnation, the Union Athletic Association of Philadelphia. He was also a player-coach for the Frankford Yellow Jackets, prior to their NFL membership in 1924.

Before playing professional football, Miller played college football for the University of Pennsylvania. While playing for the Penn Quakers football team, he was a consensus first-team All-American in both 1917 and 1919.

== Late life and death ==
Miller later worked as an insurance executive. He died at the age of 71, on June 9, 1964, at his home in Longport, New Jersey.

== Head coaching record ==
=== College ===
Year	Team	Overall	Conference	Standing	Bowl/playoffs
Saint Joseph's Hawks (Independent) (1923)
1923	Saint Joseph's	5–2			
Temple Owls (Independent) (1925–1932)
1925	Temple	5–2–2			
1926	Temple	5–3			
1927	Temple	7–1			
1928	Temple	7–1–2			
1929	Temple	6–3–1			
1930	Temple	7–3			
1931	Temple	8–1–1			
1932	Temple	5–1–2			
Temple:		50–15–8			
Saint Joseph's Hawks (Independent) (1934–1939)
1934	Saint Joseph's	2–5–1			
1935	Saint Joseph's	3–4–1			
1936	Saint Joseph's	6–2–1			
1937	Saint Joseph's	5–3–1			
1938	Saint Joseph's	6–3			
1939	Saint Joseph's	4–4–1			
Saint Joseph's:		31–23–5			
West Chester Golden Rams (Pennsylvania State Teachers College Conference) (1942)
1942	West Chester	5–3–1	1–2	T–6th	
West Chester:		5–3–1	1–2		
Total:		86–41–14			
