= Ockie Anderson =

American football player and coach (1894–1962)

Profile
- Position: Quarterback

Personal information
- Born: October 15, 1894; Erie, Pennsylvania, U.S.
- Died: January 25, 1962 (aged 67); Buffalo, New York, U.S.

Career information
- College: Colgate

Career history
- 1920–1922: Buffalo All-Americans
- 1920: Union Club of Phoenixville
- 1921: Union Quakers of Philadelphia

Awards and highlights
- Consensus All-American (1916); First-team All-Service (1917)

Other information
- Military career
- Allegiance: United States
- Branch: U.S. Army
- Service years: 1917–1919
- Conflicts: World War I Western Front
- Awards: Disputed NFL champion (1920 and 1921)

Oscar Carl "Ockie" Anderson (October 15, 1894 – January 25, 1962) was an American football player and coach. He played college football at Colgate University was selected as a first-team All-American in 1916 at quarterback. Anderson later played professional football for the Buffalo All-Americans of the American Professional Football Association (APFA)—now known as the National Football League (NFL). He was one of the leading scorers in the 1920 and 1921 APFA seasons.

== Biography ==
=== Colgate University ===
Anderson was born in Erie, Pennsylvania and attended Colgate University.

==== All-American quarterback ====
Anderson played quarterback for Colgate from 1914 to 1916. He was considered one of the best forward passers of his era. Following a 1914 game between Syracuse and Colgate, the Syracuse Herald praised Anderson's passing ability:

"Quarterback Anderson, one of tho slipperiest men who has been seen in the Syracuse stadium and a mighty clever general, proved himself to be an expert in throwing the forward pass, his aim being wonderfully accurate. When he raced back five yards and turned, he usually found his man with one quick glance and then heaved the ball to within a few feet of where he was."

During Anderson's time as quarterback at Colgate, the team compiled a record of 23–5–2. He led the 1916 Colgate football team to an 8–1 record as the team outscored its opponents 218–30. Colgate beat strong teams from Illinois (15–3), Syracuse (15–0), and Brown (28–0), but lost a close game against Yale (7–3) in New Haven. At the end of the 1916 season, Anderson was selected as a first-team All-American by Walter Camp, the International News Service, and The Boston Post. One critic wrote the following about the selection of Anderson as the first-team All-American quarterback for 1916:

"[A]fter the Colgate-Brown game, a struggle between two of the best football teams of the east, the experting fellow found Anderson, of Colgate, standing out as a brilliant star. Anderson is a field general of admitted ability. He has shown rare judgment in directing his attack in every game in which he appeared this year. He's fast, a good groundgainer both through the line and in the open, and he can boot the ball when called upon to do so, although several other members of his team did their share of toeing the pigskin this year."

Nationally syndicated sports writer Tommy Clark chose Anderson not only as his first-team All-American at quarterback, but also named Anderson to act as captain of the All-American team. Clark explained his selection of Anderson as follows:

"Carl Anderson of Colgate is selected to play quarter and to act as captain of the All American eleven. He has been a star at Colgate for three seasons. He is an accurate forward paser, and his passing gave Colgate the 13-0 victory over the Army last season. He is a good broken field runner, and his running back of punts has been a feature of several games this year. He feeds his backs in faultless style, the result being that Colgate did not fumble at Yale, only once against Illinois, and that on a direct pass, and not once against Syracuse and Brown. Anderson has played against some of the best quarterbacks of the year, Macomber of Illinois, Smith of Yale and Meehan of Syracuse. None of them outplayed him."

==== All-around athlete in five sports ====
Anderson was an all-around athlete who competed in five sports for Colgate. In February 1917, The Washington Post ran a feature story on Anderson's diverse athletic abilities. The Post wrote:

"As is the case with most football men of unusual abilltv, Carl Anderson, of Colgate, all-American quarterback by almost universal choice, is a great all-around athlete. He has won his letter at football, track and basketball and is a hockey and baseball star. However, he is so anxious to overcome this and to make his letter in five sports that he now has reported for the hockey team and will give up track work in the spring in favor of baseball. He is not only a brilliant sprinter, as his football work would indicate, but is also a clever hurdler and can jump 21 feet in the broad jump. Last year in the dual meets he twice was clocked in ten seconds for the 100 and 22 flat for the 220."

Anderson has been inducted into the Colgate University Athletics Hall of Honor.

=== Military service and athletic director ===
Anderson later served in the military during World War I, including service in France. In November 1917, Anderson led the Camp Dix national army football team to a 19–0 win over Camp Devens in a game played in Boston. In the second quarter, Anderson ran 70 yards around right end for a touchdown. A few minutes later, he caught a punt and "sprinted 60 yards for another score."

After the war, he worked as an athletic director in the Erie, Pennsylvania school system.

=== Buffalo All-Americans ===
In August 1920, the National Football League (NFL), known in its first two seasons as the American Professional Football Association (APFA), was formed in Canton, Ohio. Anderson signed on to play for the Buffalo All-Americans. In the 1920 APFA season, the inaugural season of the league, Anderson helped Buffalo to a 9–1–1 record, rotating between quarterback and running back with Tommy Hughitt. Anderson was the league's second leading scorer in 1920. Though individual statistics for the 1920 season are unofficial, historical accounts indicate that Anderson scored 11 touchdowns and either 69 or 71 points. Whether his point total was 69 or 71, Anderson's scoring in 1920 exceeded the total scoring of at least four teams—the Detroit Heralds (53), Chicago Tigers (49), Columbus Panhandles (41), and Cleveland Tigers (28). The only player with a higher point total than Anderson in the 1920 season was Dutch Sternaman of Decatur.

In the 1921 APFA season, Buffalo was again one of the best teams in the league with a record of 9–1–2. That year, Anderson led the league with seven touchdowns and tied for second in scoring with 42 points. Teammate Elmer Oliphant led the league in scoring with 47 points.

Anderson suffered a knee injury and played only sparingly in the 1922 NFL season. His last game was a 3–3 tie against the Akron Pros in November 1922.

=== Later life ===
Anderson retired from football after the 1922 season. Anderson resided in Tonawanda, New York from 1922 until his death in 1962. In 1933, he entered the hardware business with his father-in-law, H. B. Koenig. He became the president of H.B. Koenig, Inc. In his later life, Anderson suffered from emphysema, reportedly the result of smoking and the effect of poisonous gas inhaled in France during World War I. Anderson died in 1962 at Buffalo General Hospital. He was survived by his wife, the former Mildred K. Koenig and a son, Robert H. Anderson.
