= Stan Cofall =

American football player and coach (1894–1962)

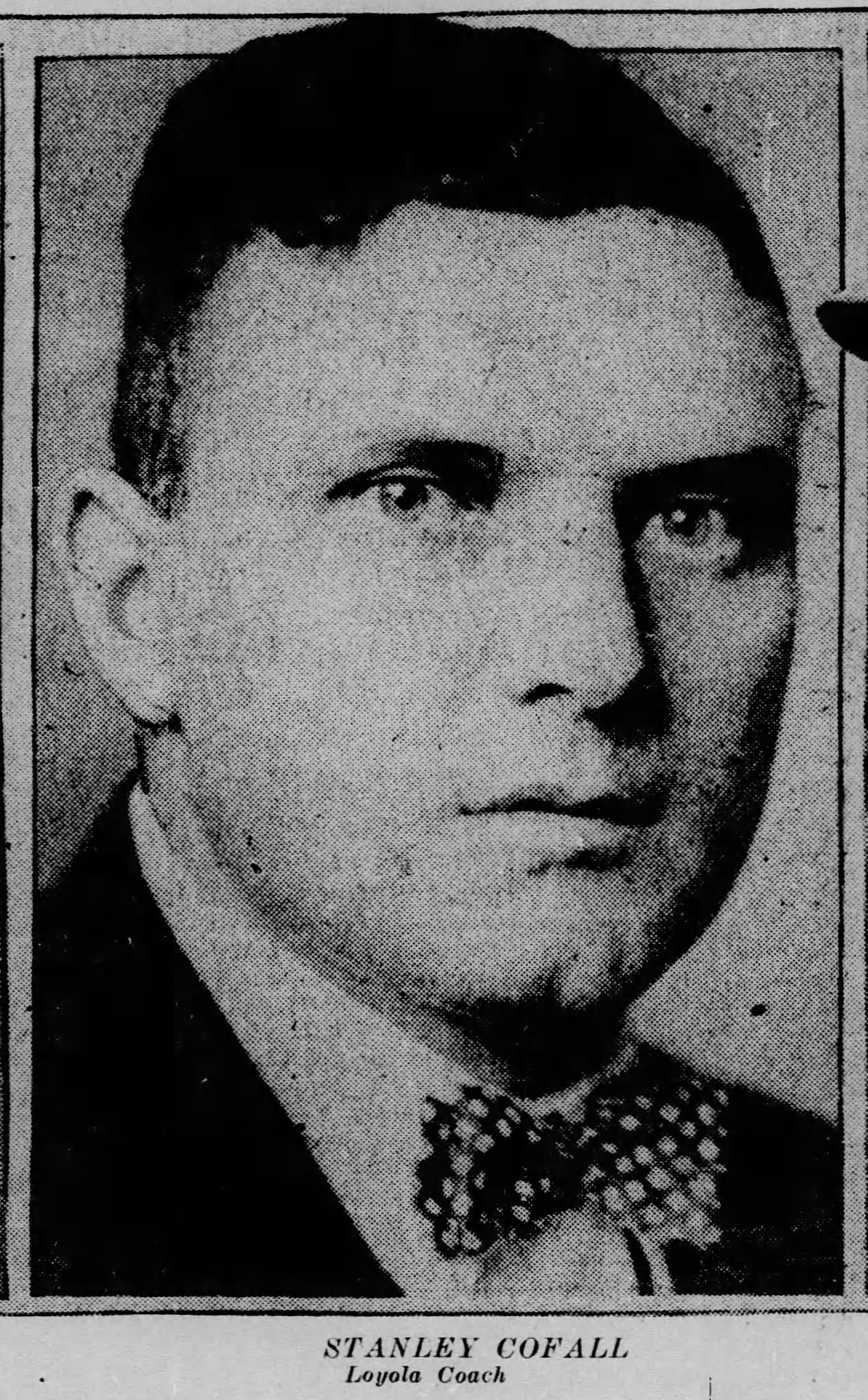
- Cofall in 1925

Profile
- Positions: Wingback, tailback

Personal information
- Born: May 5, 1894; Cleveland, Ohio, U.S.
- Died: September 21, 1962 (aged 68); Peninsula, Ohio, U.S.

Career information
- College: Notre Dame (1913–1916)

Career history

Playing
- Massillon Tigers (1915–1917); Youngstown Patricians (1917); Cleveland Tigers (1920); Union Club of Phoenixville (1920); New York Brickley Giants (1921); Union Quakers (1921); Pottsville Maroons (1922–1924)

Coaching
- Massillon Tigers (1915–1917); Cleveland Tigers (1920); Roman Catholic HS (PA) (1922–1923); Loyola (MD) (1925–1927); Wake Forest (1928)

Awards and highlights
- First-team All-American (1916)
- Coaching profile at Pro Football Reference

Stanley Bingham Cofall (May 5, 1894 – September 21, 1961) was an American football player and coach.

== Early life ==
Cofall was born in Cleveland, Ohio to Fred and Ida Bingham Cofall. In 1910 he played football at East Technical High School. He then moved to East High School where he became all-scholastic in football and ice hockey.

== Notre Dame ==
Cofall attended the University of Notre Dame where he played halfback. Cofall was prohibited from playing on the varsity team during the 1913 season due to the new freshmen eligibility rules, so he played in the university's own residence hall intramural system, known colloquially as "interhall", and was selected for the All-Interhall team as a left halfback from Sorin Hall. In 1914, Cofall's first year with the Irish varsity team, he scored 9 touchdowns, and led the team with 82 points. The following year, Cofall scored 9 touchdowns and again led the team with 71 points. After scoring 12 touchdowns and 84 points in 1916, he was named to several All-American teams. Stan also served as the team's captain that year.

== Professional football ==
After graduation in 1917 he served as a player-coach with the professional Massillon Tigers. His football career went on hiatus from 1918 to 1919, while serving in World War I. After the war, Cofall helped organize the Cleveland Indians football team, and the following year he and owner Jimmy O'Donnell traveled to Canton, Ohio, and attended a meeting where the American Professional Football Association (later named the National Football League) was organized. At the meeting Cofall was named as the league's first vice president. In 1921 he played one game with the short-lived New York Brickley Giants.

In 1920 Cofall played for the Union Club of Phoenixville, an independent team, which featured many players from the Buffalo All-Americans. He later played for Union Quakers of Philadelphia, after the Phoenixville team's star player transferred to that newly created team. In 1922, he signed on to play with the, then-independent, Pottsville Maroons. There he helped the Maroons become the top team in the Pennsylvania coal region. In 1924, Cofall helped the Maroons win the Anthracite League championship. The following year, the Maroons joined the NFL.

== College coaching ==
Later, Cofall coached various professional and college teams. From 1925 to 1927, he was the head football coach at Loyola College in Maryland—now known as Loyola University Maryland. Cofall was the head football coach at Wake Forest College—now known as Wake Forest University—in 1928.

== After football ==
Cofall returned to Cleveland where he founded Stanco Oil Company in 1935. That company later merged with the National Solvent Corporation, manufacturer of greases and oils, in 1937 with Cofall as president-treasurer. Cofall continued to be active in the Cleveland sports scene. In 1942 he helped bring the Notre Dame–Navy football game to Cleveland and was a founder of the Cleveland Touchdown Club. He also served as chairman of the Cleveland Boxing Commission and the director of liquor control for the state of Ohio.

== Family ==
Cofall was married to Irene Held, and they had three children, Jack, Stanley Jr., and Mrs. Blossom Cummings. After their divorce in 1953, he and his second wife, Louise, moved to Peninsula, Ohio. They had a child, Dan Cofall. Cofall died at home in 1962 and was buried at Union Cemetery in Peninsula. Cofall's son, Dan Cofall, graduated from Notre Dame and Southern Methodist University. Dan also hosts the daily financial talk show, "The Wall Street Shuffle", heard daily 4-6pm on CNN 1190am radio in Dallas-Ft. Worth.

== Head coaching record ==
=== College ===
| Year | Team | Overall | Conference | Standing | Bowl/playoffs |
|---|---|---|---|---|---|
Loyola Green and Gray (Independent) (1925–1927)
| 1925 | Loyola | 2–6 | | | |
| 1926 | Loyola | 5–4–1 | | | |
| 1927 | Loyola | 3–6 | | | |
| Loyola: | | 10–16–1 | | | |
Wake Forest Demon Deacons (Independent) (1928)
| 1928 | Wake Forest | 2–6–2 | | | |
| Wake Forest: | | 2–6–2 | | | |
| Total: | | 12–22–3 | | | |
