= Union Quakers of Philadelphia =

Defunct sports team

General information
- Founded: 1921
- Folded: 1921
- Stadium: National League Park
- Headquartered: Philadelphia, Pennsylvania
- Colors: Red, White

Personnel
- Owners: Heinie Miller and Leo Conway
- General manager: Leo Conway
- Head coach: Heinie Miller

Team history
- Union Quakers of Philadelphia

League / conference affiliations
- Independent

The Union Quakers of Philadelphia were a professional independent football team, based in Philadelphia, Pennsylvania, in 1921. The team evolved from a number of pro players who played with the Union Club of Phoenixville during their 1920 season. During their only season of operation, the club won the "Philadelphia City Championship". All of the team's home games were played at the Phillies' National League Park on North Broad Street.

== History ==
=== Origins ===
At the end of a highly successful 1920 football season, the team's coach and captain, Heinie Miller, created a proposal for the directors of the Phoenixville Union Club to sponsor his pro football team for a second season. The team was to have the same line-up as the previous year's. However, the proposal was declined by the club, who opted instead to field a less costly team of mostly local talent. As a result, Miller and Leo Conway quickly announced the formation of the Union Athletic Association of Philadelphia.

The Union Club, however, was often referred to by the press as the "Union Athletic Association", a name that was associated with the Phoenixville team. So to avoid confusion, the new organization's name was soon changed to the Union Quakers of Philadelphia. The "Union" reference was kept as an attempt to maintain some continuity and to remind the fans that this was essentially the same line-up that had been so successful in Phoenixille in 1920. The team also featured many players from the University of Pennsylvania, who were nicknamed the "Quakers". For example, Bill Hollenback a former All-American at Penn played for the Union Quakers in 1921, as did future Philadelphia Eagles founder, co-owner and coach, Bert Bell. The team's manager Leo Conway was also Penn alumnus as were most of the Union Quakers offensive linemen, like Heinie Miller, Lou Little and Lud Wray.

=== 1921 season ===
==== 3–1 start ====
In their inaugural game, the Union Quakers defeated the Shenandoah Yellow Jackets 24–0. The Yellow Jackets were members of the Anthracite League, a group of teams located in Pennsylvania's coal mining belt. For their second game of the 1921 campaign, the Union Quakers defeated another Anthracite team, the Coaldale Big Green 2–0. The game's only score came via a safety, by Stan Cofall.

However a week later, the Union Quakers were scheduled to play the New York Brickley Giants, a member of the American Professional Football Association. While a fumble from Philadelphia's Clarence Beck, led to a Giants field goal in the game's opening minutes, the Union Quakers defense prevented the Giants from gaining a first down the whole game. However Philadelphia was unable to score the entire game and lost their first game of the season 3–0.

After the Giants game, Philadelphia played the Holmesburg Athletic Club. Holmesburg, Conshohocken Athletic Club and the pre-NFL Frankford Yellow Jackets were considered the top teams in eastern Pennsylvania at the time. The Union Quakers defeated Holmesburg 21–0, by way of two Johnny Scott touchdowns and one by Ockie Anderson. However, the biggest game of the season would take place a week later as Philadelphia was scheduled to play another AFPA team, the Canton Bulldogs.

The previous season, while still under the Phoenixville moniker, the Union Quakers defeated the Bulldogs 7–3. The 1921 Bulldogs team no longer featured the legendary Jim Thorpe, however newer players like Pete Henry and Pie Way has stepped up to create a strong team.

==== Cancellation and dispute with Buffalo ====
The night before the Bulldogs game, Frank McNeil, the owner of the Buffalo All-Americans lodged a protest with APFA officials regarding the Quakers-Bulldogs game. Many of the Buffalo players were associated with the Quakers in 1921, just as they had been with the Phoenixville team the previous year. These players would play a non-league game with the Quakers on Saturdays and then take a train to Buffalo and the next day's game. This arrangement helped the Buffalo players, earn extra money in between league games.

McNeil felt that his team's poor performance in a crucial game against the Akron Pros, was due to his key players being exhausted from Union's victory over Holmesburg two days earlier. Meanwhile, Buffalo was still a contender to win 1921 AFPA Championship and was scheduled to Canton the day after Union. McNeil feared that his players would be too tired from playing with the Quakers that they would deliver another lackluster performance and lose not only the game to Canton, but eliminate themselves from winning the AFPA title. McNeil then told Canton that the rules league's rules governing games against non-league teams were prohibited without the prior approval of the league. As a result, Canton cancelled their game against the Quakers. Meanwhile, Heinie Miller, Lud Wray, Lou Little, Johnny Scott and Butch Spagna, who were previously involved in an ongoing financial dispute with McNeil, decided to leave the All-Americans and played the remainder of the season with the Quakers.

Leo Conway was able to arrange for the Union Quakers to play another AFPA team, to make up for the loss of the Canton game. The Rochester Jeffersons played the Quakers to a 3–3 tie. Since the Jeffs were losing large amounts of money during the 1921 season and needed the revenue from the Union Quakers game, the AFPA decided to not interfere. Buffalo's Swede Youngstrom and Pat Smith played for Quakers against Rochester before heading back to Buffalo for that club's game with Canton. It would be their last game for the Quakers.

==== Strong schedule ====
The Quakers brought other players in to strengthen their roster. These players included Jim Laird, who had previously faced the Quakers as a member of both the Brickley Giants and Rochester Jeffersons, future Hall of Famer Joe Guyon and Pete Calac, both of whom were playing with the Cleveland Tigers at the time. The team then prepared to play another top independent eastern Pennsylvania team the Conshohocken Athletic Club. That game resulted in 14–0 Union Quakers victory. Two days later the Quakers travelled to Frankford to take on the pre-NFL Frankford Yellow Jackets. Tiny Maxwell, a former pro and college football standout, officiated the game, which ended in a scoreless tie. On December 3, 1921, the Union Quakers were finally able to schedule and play a game against the Canton Bulldogs. Despite a hard fought game, the Quakers lost the game, 14–9, due to a late touchdown reception by Canton's Harry Robb.

==== City champions ====
However, the Union Quakers soon scheduled rematches against Frankford and Canton. They also signed two former Penn State Nittany Lions' football players, Hinkey Haines and Harry Robb, who had just caught the winning touchdown for Canton, during the December 3rd contest. The Quakers-Yellow Jackets game resulted in 7–0 victory for the Union Quakers and gave them bragging rights as the Philadelphia City Champions. Afterwards the Quakers entered into a rematch against the Canton Bulldogs. The second game between the two teams, resulted in a 34–0 Union Quakers victory.

=== Possible NFL franchise? ===
Since the team's time in Phoenixville in 1920, Leo Conway had been trying to get the club into the AFPA. He had been present at several league meetings and before the 1921 season and had met with several franchise owners during the season. Wins over the Canton Bulldogs and Frankford Yellow Jackets showed that the Union Quakers could be a strong team in the league. During the off season Leo Conway and Heinie Miller attended meetings of the APFA. Before those series of meetings, two major items were decided. It was first concluded the APFA would change its name to the National Football League, and that Philadelphia would be awarded a league franchise. However, for reasons unknown (the heavy use of players already on NFL teams and Pennsylvania's still-extant blue laws were likely factors), the Union Quakers plans to enter the NFL were eventually dropped. Whatever members of the Union Quakers team who were not already on an NFL squad were absorbed by the Frankford Yellow Jackets, who posted a 13–0–1 record in 1922. Leo Conway disappeared from the Philadelphia football scene until 1926, when he went on to own and manage the similarly named Philadelphia Quakers of the first American Football League. That team would go on to win the league's only championship. Bell and Wray would later re-emerge as the owners and founders of the modern-day Philadelphia Eagles team, which was founded in 1933, after the Yellow Jackets folded in 1931.
