= 1915 Buffalo All-Stars season =

Semi-pro football team

- General manager: Eugene F. Dooley
- Home stadium: Ryan's Park

Results
- Record: 6–0–1

The 1915 Buffalo All-Stars (or just "All-Buffalo" as they were known in local papers) played in the Buffalo Semi Pro Football division which was considered part of the New York Pro Football League.

The Buffalo All-Stars went through the season without suffering a defeat or having their goal line crossed while beating some of the best football squads in western and central New York, according to the manager's official report.

The team posted a record of 6–0–1 outscoring opponents 182–0 and considered themselves the champions of western New York football for 1915.

The team was called All-Buffalo, in part, because every section of the city of Buffalo, NY was represented on the squad. The team consisted of the following players: Lynch, Provonsha, Bailey, Knapp. Tallchief, Gabriel, Gregory, Dooley, Sherman, Jeffrey, Henneman, Jones, Johnson and Shoemaker. There were three former college players in the lineup, among them Johnson, an end from Penn State; Jeffrey, a half back from North Carolina; and Provonsha, a tackle from Oberlin.

Eugene F. Dooley played quarterback and also managed the team.

== Schedule ==
Game	Date	Opponent	Result	Record
1	September 26	at Tonawanda Frontiers	W 7–0	1–0
2	October 10	Selkirks	W 25–0	2–0
3	October 17	All-Lancaster	W 32–0	3–0
4	October 24	at Rochester Jeffersons	T 0–0	3–0–1
5	October 31	Iroquois Indians	W 52–0	4–0–1
6	November 7	Oakdales	W 32–0	5–0–1
7	November 14 (Note: On November 14, an All-Buffalo 'Reserve' team played the Detroit Heralds in Detroit and lost 69-0. This was the Reserves' only game of the season.)	Rochester Jeffersons	W 34–0	6–0–1
8	November 21	Lancaster Malleables	Cancelled	6–0–1
