= Jim Kendrick =

American football player (1893–1941)

No. 15 (1922), 5 (1925–1926)
- Position: End

Personal information
- Born: August 22, 1893; Hillside, Texas, U.S.
- Died: November 17, 1941 (aged 48); Waco, Texas, U.S.
- Listed height: 6 ft 0 in (1.83 m)
- Listed weight: 197 lb (89 kg)

Career information
- College: Texas A&M

Career history
- Toledo Maroons (1922); Canton Bulldogs (1922); Louisville Brecks (1923) (player-coach); Chicago Bears (1924); Hammond Pros (1925); Buffalo Bisons (1925); Rochester Jeffersons (1925); Rock Island Independents (1925); Buffalo Rangers (1926) (player-coach); New York Giants (1927)

Awards and highlights
- 2× NFL champion (1922, 1927)
- Coaching profile at Pro Football Reference
- Stats at Pro Football Reference

James Marcellus Kendrick (August 22, 1893 – November 17, 1941) was an American professional football player during the early years of the National Football League (NFL) with the Toledo Maroons, Canton Bulldogs, Louisville Brecks, Chicago Bears, Hammond Pros, Buffalo Bisons, Rochester Jeffersons, Rock Island Independents, Buffalo Rangers and New York Giants. He was a part of the Bulldogs' 1922 NFL championship team and the Giants' 1927 NFL Championship team. Kendrick played for nine teams during his NFL career (the most in league history for an end).

== Early life ==
Jim, born in Hillside, Texas, on August 22, 1893, was the youngest of nine children to J. M. and Lura Kendrick. In 1904 his family relocated to Waco, Texas where Jim attended Douglas Select School. The school did not have a football team at the time, however Jim did excel on the school's baseball team. In 1911, he was elected 'president of his senior class.

== College career ==
Jim did not play organized football until he entered Texas A&M University. There he earned All-Conference honors as an end in 1915. During the 1915 season, Kendrick and the Aggies defeated their rival Texas Longhorns 13–0. Jim also played baseball and basketball for the Aggies.

== Military service ==
In 1916, Jim was a lieutenant in the Texas National Guard. He was part of the Second Texas Infantry Regiment. That year, he was part of a force called up to track down the Mexican bandit (or revolutionary) Pancho Villa. Jim served in the US forces under the legendary General Jack Pershing. Jim joined the United States Army in 1917 and was in France during World War I.

During this era, many military units created football teams. Jim's team, the Texas 2nd Infantry, won the U.S. National Guard Championship in 1917. The team won eight games and was only scored on once. Kendrick also played for the 36th Division in the 1919 American Expeditionary Force championship game in Paris.

== Professional career ==
When the war ended, Jim became an assistant football coach at Baylor. In 1922, Jim played professional football and signed with Canton Bulldogs of the National Football League. Jim played for the Bulldogs however he would occasionally sneak into the line-up for the Toledo Maroons for a few games. That year the Bulldogs won the 1922 NFL Championship.

In 1923, Jim accepted an assistant coaching position at Centre College in Danville, Kentucky. He also coached the school's baseball and basketball teams. On Sundays, he played for the Louisville Brecks. The team was 0–3 in NFL competition. In 1924 Jim played for the Chicago Bears and still kept his coaching position at Centre and during the off-season, Jim managed and played for the Cleveland Indians minor league affiliate in Bradenton, Florida. In 1925, Jim began playing for the Hammond Pros. However, the Buffalo Bisons wrestled him away from his contract to play football for them in 1925. He also played for the Rochester Jeffersons and Rock Island Independents in 1925

In 1926 Jim was chosen to form a team for the Buffalo Bisons, composed only of players from Texas and Oklahoma. The team was renamed the Rangers, after Texas' legendary peacekeeping force. The team ended the season with a final record of 4–4–2. However, the Bisons only won two games overall in the three other seasons without Hughitt (1925, 1927, 1929), each year with a different head coach. Kendrick played in 8 games for the New York Giants in 1927. The Giants won the 1927 NFL Championship, Jim's second title.

== After football ==
In 1928, Jim was named the head football coach at St. Mary's University in San Antonio, Texas. He coached the Rattlers for just one season. In 1933 Jim was coaching the Blanco Tree Army Reserve football team for the Civilian Conservation Corps. That year a traffic accident occurred as the team was en route to a playoff game. Two players were killed and others wounded. Jim suffered severe injuries to his right arm, but selflessly insisted that doctors attend to his men first. As a result, the arm became infected and had to be amputated two inches above the elbow. For this act of heroism, Jim Kendrick was awarded the Soldier's Medal, awarded to army personnel for heroic deeds performed during peacetime, by the United States War Department.

Kendrick later became a college game official, presiding over several major games during the mid-to-late 1930s. He also was active in the oil industry and remained working there until his death.

== Death ==
At age 48, Jim died in his hometown of Waco, Texas on November 17, 1941, as the result of a stroke. He was survived by his wife Lucile and four sons (James M. Kendrick Jr., Charles E. Kendrick, Jack I. Kendrick and Gardner S. Kendrick).

== Head coaching record ==
Team	Year	Regular season					Postseason			
Team	Year	Won	Lost	Ties	Win %	Finish	Won	Lost	Win %	Result
LOU	1923	0	3	0	.000	T-19th in NFL	–	–	–	–
BUF	1926	4	4	2	.500	9th in NFL	–	–	–	–
Total		4	7	2	.385		–	–	–	–

== See also ==
- List of NFL players by most teams played for
