= Louisville in the NFL =

Louisville early NFL history

Louisville Breckenridges / Colonels

General information
- Founded: c. 1899
- Folded: 1924 (Brecks), 1926 (Colonels)
- Stadium: Eclipse Park; Traveling team Parkway Field
- Headquartered: Louisville, Kentucky, United States (Brecks); Chicago, Illinois, United States (Colonels)
- Colors: Unknown

Personnel
- Owner: Aaron Hertzman
- Head coach: Austin Higgins (1921); Hubert Wiggs (1922); Jim Kendrick (1923); Lenny Sachs (1926)

Nickname
- Brecks

Team history
- Louisville Breckenridges Club (c. 1899–1906); Louisville Breckenridges (1907–1923); Louisville Colonels (1926)

League / conference affiliations
- Independent (1899–1920); National Football League (1921–1923, 1926)

Louisville, Kentucky had two professional American football teams in the National Football League: the Louisville Breckenridges (or Brecks for short) from 1921 to 1924 and the Louisville Colonels in 1926.

The NFL intended for the Brecks to be a traveling team, however the team played a series of "home" games. All Brecks home games were played at Eclipse Park, until the stadium caught fire and burned to the ground on November 20, 1922. Meanwhile, the Colonels played all of their games on the road. While the Colonels were really a traveling team out of Chicago they are usually accepted as a continuation of the Brecks franchise.

== Louisville Brecks (1899–1924) ==
The Brecks dated their beginnings back to 1899. Officially the name of the team was the Louisville Breckenridge Club. The club was located in Louisville at corner of Fifth and St. Catherine Streets at what was then the city's perimeter. The Louisville Courier-Journal reported in 1922 that the Brecks dated "back fifteen years, springing from a boys neighborhood team, the Floyds and Brecks, that has kept itself intact probably longer than any independent team in the country." At first the team was considered an amateur team, made up of mostly neighborhood boys. However, by 1919, the team was considered professional, although evidently still made up of local players.

The team's first ever professional football game was held on November 16, 1919. The game resulted in a 17–0 Brecks victory over the New Albany Calumets. That win allowed the Brecks to claim the mythical "Falls Cities" title. While a champion was declared, no "league" existed at this time.

=== The NFL ===
Brecks owner, Aaron Hertzman, sent a $25 franchise fee to the NFL on February 21, 1921. The Official NFL Encyclopedia confirms that although officials from Louisville failed to attend the April 1921 league meeting, the NFL did receive a letter requesting a franchise from the Breckenridges. As a result, Hertzman beat out many of the other professional and semi-pro football teams in the Louisville area. In 1920, there were at least nine independent teams in the area, including the Brecks and the Evansville Ex-Collegians.

NFL President Joseph Carr liked the idea of having professional football in cities with strong baseball traditions. This may answer why he granted Hertzman and the Brecks their franchise in 1921. Unlike today, the announcement of Louisville being granted an NFL franchise, was widely ignored by the Louisville press. However, in 1920, only a little attention had been paid the league.

The Brecks were one of eight teams that joined the NFL (then called the American Professional Football Association) in 1921. Carr had intended to use the Brecks a traveling team to fill in open dates in the schedules of the more "established" teams. However, the Brecks did not operate like one. The team played only two league games in 1921, one at home and one on the road, hardly justify the Brecks as a road team. But they were all Louisville born or raised in Louisville. And unlike most road teams, the Brecks' two league games were not with established teams but with the struggling Evansville Crimson Giants and the Columbus Panhandles, another road team.

Hertzman managed the Brecks. The team played split schedules between league games and local, independent games.

==== 1921 season ====
They lost their first league game to the Evansville Crimson Giants on October 2, 1921. Reports estimated that the game drew more than 2,000 spectators. The games proceeds went to a fund to erect a memorial to the first Indiana soldier to die in World War I. The Brecks next six games were played at Eclipse Park against independent teams. During those six games, the Brecks finished with a 4–2 record. A November 6, 1921 a game with the Cincinnati Celts was canceled, because the Celts could not fulfill the contract.

The Brecks didn't play another APFA team until December 4. That game resulted in a 6–0 loss to the Columbus Panhandles in Louisville, due to a late game touchdown pass. The Brecks lost their only two league games in 1921, however they did manage to finish with an overall record of 4–4–1. Karl Hower, played in 1921 for his hometown team.

==== 1922 season ====
The Brecks home schedule included only games with other road teams. However, the Brecks played a series of tough opponents on the road. The team lost on the road to the eventual 1922 NFL Champion Canton Bulldogs 38–0 and the Toledo Maroons 39–0. The very next game featured the worst loss in franchise history as the Brecks were defeated by the Racine Legion 59–0.

Louisville's first NFL victory didn't come until November 22, 1922. During that game, the Brecks defeated the Crimson Giants, 13–6. This game also proved to be the only game in which the Brecks scored.

However, the Brecks experienced tragedy a few days later, when Eclipse Park caught fire and burned to the ground. The team's remaining two games were then cancelled. Had Eclipse Park not burned down, forcing cancellation of the final two games, the team would probably have financially broken even.

==== 1923 season ====
After the destruction of Eclipse Park, the Brecks decided to play their home games of the 1923 season at the newly constructed Parkway Field. In order for the team to bring the Akron Pros, Columbus Panhandles, or Oorang Indians to Louisville, the Brecks announced the sale of season tickets. However, the 1923 season began in the same manner as the previous year, with a 37–0 loss to Canton. The following week saw a 34–0 loss at Columbus. Meanwhile, the Brecks home opener against Akron was cancelled due to poor ticket sales. The Breck did manage to play the Oorang Indians in Louisville, for the team's very last NFL game. The Indians were an all-Native American football team, created by, owner Walter Lingo to promote the sale of his Airedale Terriers. The game included pre-game entertainment and the very first halftime shows. The Indians roster also included Jim Thorpe. The Brecks lost the game 12–0.

==== 1924 season ====
The Brecks finished their last season of football in 1924 as members of the Fall Cities Football Federation and compiled a 2–3 record. The Brecks felt Alumni Field was "more suitable" to their schedule and moved their home games to the field in 1924. Meanwhile, Aaron Hertzman, the owner of the now defunct Brecks, was elected the NFL's Sergeant of Arms.

== Louisville Colonels (1926) ==
The Louisville Colonels were created in 1926 to fill the schedules of the expanded NFL, but they were a traveling team that operated out of Chicago. That season, the NFL added several semi-pro teams to their ranks, mostly to keep them out of the rival American Football League. While the Colonels were really a traveling team out of Chicago, they are usually accepted as a continuation of the Brecks franchise. Bill Harley, the former owner of the Toledo Maroons, was granted the right to manage the Louisville Colonel operation out of Chicago, while Hertzman still owned the team.

The Colonels failed to register a single point during the 1926 season, one of a very small number of organized teams to have suffered such an ignonomy. The team's first game resulted in a 13–0 loss to the Canton Bulldogs, while their second game resulted in a 47–0 loss to the Detroit Panthers. Louisville's final two NFL games came on November 7, 1926 (Chicago Bears 34, Louisville Colonels 0) and November 14, 1926 (Green Bay Packers 14, Louisville Colonels 0).

The Brecks-Colonels franchise is the last team from the four currently extant major professional sports leagues in the United States and Canada to play its home games in Kentucky, although the Kentucky Colonels played in the American Basketball Association from 1967 until the ABA-NBA merger brought the ABA into the National Basketball Association after the 1975–76 season. Only five of 38 different players played NFL football outside of Louisville.

== Season-by-season ==
| | Year | W | L | T | Finish | Coach |
|---|---|---|---|---|---|---|
| Brecks | 1921 | 0 | 2 | 0 | 18th | Austin Higgins |
| Brecks | 1922 | 1 | 3 | 0 | 12th | Hubert Wiggs |
| Brecks | 1923 | 0 | 3 | 0 | 19th | Jim Kendrick |
| Colonels | 1926 | 0 | 4 | 0 | 21st | Lenny Sachs |
| Total | | 1 | 12 | 0 | .077 | |

== See also ==
- Sports in Louisville, Kentucky
