= Buffalo team (NFL) =

Early-era National Football League team

Buffalo
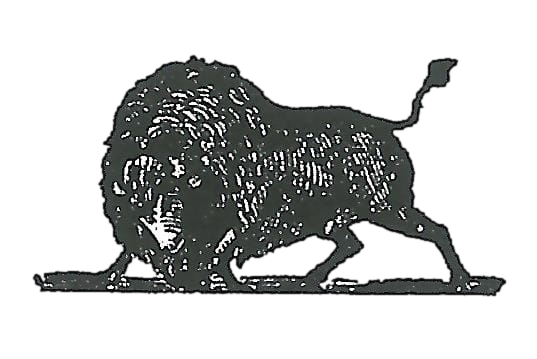
Logo

General information
- Founded: 1915
- Folded: 1929
- Stadium: Buffalo Baseball Park (1915–1923); Canisius College (1915–1923); Bison Stadium (1924–1929)
- Headquartered: Buffalo, New York, U.S.
- Colors: Black, orange, white

Personnel
- Owners: Frank McNeil (1920–1923); Tommy Hughitt/Warren D. Patterson (1924–1929)
- Head coach: Barney Lepper (1917, 1919); Tommy Hughitt (1918, 1920–1924); Walt Koppisch (1925); Jim Kendrick (1926); Dim Batterson (1927); Al Jolley (1929)

Team history
- Buffalo All-Stars (1915–1917); Buffalo Niagaras (1918); Buffalo Prospects (1919); Buffalo All-Americans (1920–1923); Buffalo Bisons (1924–1925); Buffalo Rangers (1926); Buffalo Bisons (1927–1929)

League / conference affiliations
- Buffalo Semi-Pro Football League (1918); New York Pro Football League (1919); National Football League (1920–1929)

Championships
- League championships: 2; 1918 City Champs; 1919 New York Pro Champs

Buffalo, New York had a turbulent, early-era National Football League team that operated under multiple names and several different owners between the 1910s and 1920s. The early NFL-era franchise was variously called the Buffalo All-Stars from 1915 to 1917, Buffalo Niagaras in 1918, the Buffalo Prospects in 1919, Buffalo All-Americans from 1920 to 1923, Buffalo Bisons from 1924 to 1925 and in 1927 and 1929, and the Buffalo Rangers in 1926. The franchise was experiencing financial problems in 1928 and did not participate in league play that season.

== History ==
=== Prior to the NFL ===
Buffalo operated an early professional football circuit from at least the late 1800s onward. Among notable predecessors to the team discussed here were the Buffalo Oakdales, whose heyday was in the years 1908 and 1909 and who ceased operations c. 1915; the Cazenovias, who were New York's best team in 1910 and 1911; and the Lancaster Malleables, from the neighboring town of Lancaster, New York, who were the best team in the region in 1913 and 1914. These teams played each other and teams from nearby cities (for example, the Rochester Jeffersons).

The All-Stars played from 1915 to 1917 under the leadership of Eugene F. Dooley; in 1917, Dooley, along with his star player Barney Lepper, took the team on a barnstorming tour of midwestern pro football teams. In 1918, the city's teams were not allowed to play outside the area because of the 1918 flu pandemic; Dooley and Lepper discontinued the All-Stars. Shoe salesman Warren D. Patterson, at the same time as this, formed a new team known as the Buffalo Niagaras, signing former Youngstown Patricians quarterback Ernest "Tommy" Hughitt as his quarterback. As the Niagaras, the team won a citywide championship in 1918, going undefeated with a 6–0–0 record (including a forfeit), having only one touchdown scored on them in any of their six games. They were one of the few upper-level teams still able to play games that year, with most of the top-level teams (such as the Patricians, Canton Bulldogs and Massillon Tigers) all having suspended operations due to the pandemic and/or World War I player shortages; this allowed Buffalo to get a leg up on its Ohio competition and sign otherwise-unemployed players, setting a course for bringing the region on par with the Ohio League and the ultimate establishment of the NFL. With that, they could have theoretically staked a claim to being the best team in the nation, especially considering how the team would perform over the next three seasons, but the Professional Football Researchers Association is dismissive of any claim that does not come from the Ohio League, and gives the mythical "national title" to the Dayton Triangles, who also went undefeated that year. When the New York Pro Football League reopened in 1919, the team, now reorganized into a franchise known as the Prospects, defeated the Rochester Jeffersons for the league title in a two-game Thanksgiving weekend tournament. The two teams tied the Thanksgiving Day game, but Buffalo handily defeated Rochester 20–0 the following Sunday.

Lepper teamed up with Hughitt and Patterson in early 1920 to create the Buffalo All-Americans, then quickly sold the team to Frank McNeil, a somewhat abrasive and aggressive owner who was able to get the team into the National Football League for its first season. However records indicate he may not have actually entered his team into the American Professional Football Association until 1921, the All-Americans are generally shown as the third-place team in league standings from that year (the confusion stems from a statement in the minutes from the league's April 1921 reorganization meeting admitting an unidentified team from Buffalo; this may have instead been the Tonawanda Kardex, who joined the league in 1921, playing only one game). Patterson held on to the Prospects name and put together a lower quality team that played through 1923, including a 1922 game against the All-Americans themselves.

=== The NFL ===
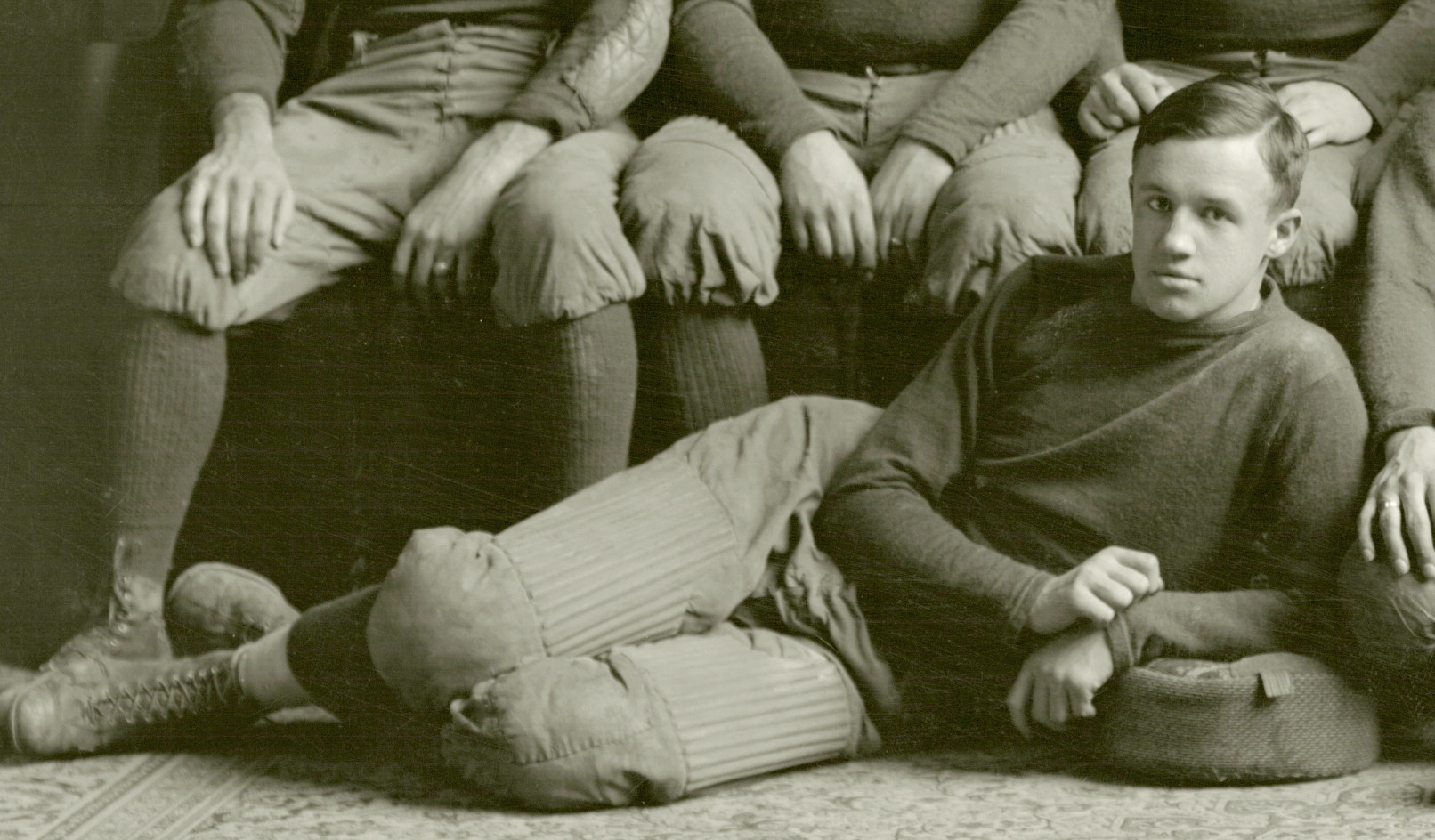
Quarterback, head coach, and part-owner Tommy Hughitt.

The All-Americans had success during its first couple of APFA seasons, posting a 9–1–1 regular season record in 1920, becoming the first professional NFL team to win by margins of 20 or more points in each of its first four games, an asterisked record which was not tied until the 2007 New England Patriots' offense duplicated the feat; the asterisk is because, in the early NFL, the All-Americans played five of its 11 games against non-league opponents.

=== The Buffalo–Phoenixville connection ===
Unique for a professional football team, the All-Americans had a sharing agreement with the Union Club of Phoenixville, a side project managed by All-Americans player Heinie Miller. Miller would take himself and seven other All-Americans to Phoenixville, Pennsylvania to play games on Saturdays (Pennsylvania had blue laws that prevented play on Sunday), and then return to Buffalo on Sundays. This sharing agreement lasted into 1921 when Miller formed the new Union Quakers of Philadelphia, but All-Americans owner Frank McNeil put a halt to the agreement halfway through the 1921 season after the Quakers played the Canton Bulldogs and wore out the All-Americans players. Five All-Americans left the team to play for the Quakers full-time; Buffalo had the pickings of the then-defunct Detroit Tigers to replenish their roster.

=== First trade in the NFL ===
In 1920, the Akron Pros held the All-Americans to a scoreless tie in front of only 3,000 fans. At the game, Akron owners Frank Nied and Art Ranney agreed to sell Bob Nash to Buffalo for $300 and five per cent of the gate, in the first known player deal between NFL clubs.

=== 1920 Championship issue ===
Along with the Decatur Staleys and Akron Pros, Buffalo claimed a share of the 1920 league title. That same season the Pros held the best record in the league, and only had to avoid losing a game. Meanwhile, Buffalo and the Staleys had to win in order to capture the APFA Championship. The Pros were able to hold the Staleys to a scoreless tie at Cub Park. However, the Pros still had to play the All-Americans who were fresh from a 7–3 win over the Canton Bulldogs at New York City's Polo Grounds. Despite Buffalo's confidence going into the match, the Pros also held the All-Americans to scoreless tie.

Both the All-Americans and the Staleys complained about the championship, arguing that Akron had only tied, but not defeated them. However, because league president Jim Thorpe and vice president Stan Cofall were absent from the meeting, Akron's owner Art Ranney was presiding over the meeting. Joseph Carr, owner of the Columbus Panhandles, moved at the league's meeting in April 1921 to give Akron the sole title and the rights to the Brunswick-Balke Collender Cup. Buffalo finished in third place, with Chicago in second place. In a separate motion, Carr would be elected league president.

According to modern NFL tie-breaking rules, the 1920 Buffalo All-Americans would be co-champions. They would be tied with the Akron Pros in win percentage, 9 1/2 wins to 1 1/2 losses (.864), both teams beating out the Decatur Staleys, who would have a season that counted 11 wins to 2 losses (.846).

=== "Staley Swindle" ===
On November 27, 1921, the All-Americans claimed the APFA title with a record of 9–0–2. However, for reason still unknown, owner Frank McNeil agreed to play two more games. He did tell the Buffalo media that the two games were exhibitions and would have no bearing on the team's claim to the APFA title. George Halas and the Chicago Staleys manage to capture second place in the APFA in 1921, with their only loss of the season against Buffalo. McNeil scheduled the two additional games against the Pros and Staleys back-to-back. The first game was scheduled for December 3 against the tough Pros, after which his team would take an all-night train to Chicago to play the Staleys the next day.

The All-Americans defeated the Pros, arriving in Chicago worn out and in no condition to play the Staleys, and lost. McNeil still believed his team was the APFA's 1921 champion, and even invested in tiny gold footballs for his players to commemorate the achievement. However Halas declared that the title was Chicago's, basing his claim on his belief that the second game of the Buffalo-Chicago series mattered more than the first. He also pointed out that the aggregate score of the two games was 16–14 in favor of the Staleys. McNeil insisted the Buffalo All-Americans were the champions, still maintaining that the last two games his team played were merely exhibitions. It didn't matter. The league awarded the championship by a vote of the Association's executive committee in January 1922 to the Staleys.

This episode is referred to by several sports historians and Buffalo sports fans as the "Staley Swindle." McNeil eventually went to his grave trying to get the league's decision overturned. In their decision, based on a generally accepted (but now obsolete) rule that if two teams play each other more than once in a season, the second game counts more than the first, the executive committee followed established tradition. Had Buffalo not played the last game, they would have had an undefeated season and won the title.

In both the 1920 and 1921 seasons, Buffalo played all of its games at home (the lone exceptions being the two 1921 matches in Chicago and one against the Detroit Tigers).

=== Buffalo Bisons ===
Under the leadership of player-coach Tommy Hughitt, the All-Americans, though they never equaled the success of the first two seasons, continued to post winning records in 1922 and 1923. Star running back Ockie Anderson's knees deteriorated during the 1922 season, forcing his early retirement and beginning the team's decline. In 1924, owner Frank McNeil sold the team back to Hughitt and Warren D. Patterson, who immediately changed the team name to Bisons (a stock name for Buffalo sports teams) and signed several players (Pete Calac, Benny Boynton and Jim Ailinger being among them) to make another run at the title. After starting the season 6–2, the team lost their last three to once again end up marginally above .500. Hughitt retired at the end of the season. After Hughitt's retirement at the end of the 1924 season, the team struggled for the rest of its lifespan.

However, on October 1, 1925, the Bisons managed to wrestle Jim Kendrick from his contract with the Hammond Pros and signed him to play for Buffalo. In 1925 the Bisons were led by former Columbia University star and Buffalo native Walter Koppisch, who was expected to return the team to championship contention but never lived up to his billing due to a number of issues with the team surrounding him. Prior to Kendrick joining the team, the Bisons were already 0–2 on the season. Kendrick's first game with Buffalo came on Sunday, October 4, 1925, against the Rochester Jeffersons. With Kendrick in the line-up, the Bisons tied the Jeffersons and the Akron Pros in their next two games. A week later the Bisons defeated the Columbus Tigers, 17–6. However tragedy struck the team just a few days later when, team captain Walter Koppisch was injured in a car accident and was advised to sit out a few games to allow his injuries to heal.

A week later, the Bisons were defeated by the Frankford Yellow Jackets, 12–3. However, the team was scheduled to play the New York Giants at the Polo Grounds, a few days later. The game was also going to be the first game back for Koppisch. However, the Bisons, despite a strong defensive showing, could not generate their offensive potential. This game was Koppisch's last appearance in a Buffalo uniform. The team then lost their final two games of the season to the Providence Steam Rollers (10–0) and the Chicago Cardinals (23–6).

In July 1926 it was announced that Walter Koppisch would not be returning to manage the Buffalo Bisons in the upcoming season. Meanwhile, Jim Kendrick was announced to be taking over as the team's manager, and serving as a player-coach.

=== Buffalo Rangers ===
Jim Kendrick announced his "Buffalo Rangers" experiment, fielding an exhibition team of players from Texas and the Southwestern United States for the 1926 season. His plan was that this exhibition squad would then represent Buffalo in the NFL. Because most of the players were Texans, the team was nicknamed the "Rangers" in deference to the state's legendary peacekeeping force. Along with the West Coast's Los Angeles Buccaneers and the South's Louisville Colonels, it was one of three teams that represented cities outside the NFL's existing footprint.

Kendrick believed that if the players have no outside interests or anything to divert their minds from playing football, they can play better. The season's outcome would determine if his theory was correct.

The Buffalo media alternately referred to the team as the "Bison Rangers," combining the old name with the new so that fans might more easily identify with the team that was on its third name in seven years. The one-year experiment brought a 4–4–2 (.500) season. Buffalo expected Kendrick to return to field the Rangers for the 1927 season, however he signed with the New York Giants, and most of the remaining players went their separate ways, citing their dislike for Buffalo's cold winters as the primary reason for leaving.

=== Return of the Bisons and closure ===
Dim Batterson, a local high school and college coach and an assistant with the team since 1925, was brought in to coach the 1927 season. After five games (all losses, all but one being a shutout), the team suspended operations and failed to finish the season. The team did not return to play in 1928, but returned in 1929 with former Oorang Indian Al Jolley as coach. Among their players that year was Jess Rodriguez, the first Hispanic-American player in the NFL (the Frankford Yellow Jackets had hired Ignacio "Lou" Molinet two years prior, but Molinet was a Cuban national). Much like in 1927, the Bisons failed to win a game until their final game, when in a case of cosmic irony they upset the Chicago Bears 19–7; thus, the very team that had spoiled their undefeated season in 1921 saved them from the indignity of a winless season in 1929. With the Great Depression underway, the Bisons folded, never to return again. During the season, the Bisons set an NFL record of six consecutive games without ever having a lead in regulation play. The record was tied in 2012 by the Kansas City Chiefs.

With the exception of the two teams that have direct descendants still in the NFL — the Bears and Arizona Cardinals — Buffalo was the longest-lived of the league's original 13 teams.

At least one further game against an NFL team was played in Buffalo in the wake of the Bisons' failure: the independent Buffalo Bears narrowly lost, 8–6, to the Cleveland Indians in a 1931 contest. Buffalo would become a regular "neutral site" for NFL exhibitions from 1938 to 1958.

The team has no official relation to future Buffalo pro football franchises: the Buffalo Indians and Tigers of the third American Football League, the Buffalo Bisons of the AAFC, or the Buffalo Bills of today which was one of the new AFL teams (formation announced in 1959) that first played in 1960.

== Players of note ==
As of 2022, no All-Americans, Bisons or Rangers player had been named to the Pro Football Hall of Fame. It is currently the longest existing team to have never contributed a player to the Hall, after the Jacksonville Jaguars had their first player Tony Boselli inducted in 2022.

=== Members of the College Football Hall of Fame ===
- Benny Boynton
- Eddie Casey
- Walter Koppisch
- Elmer Oliphant

=== Others ===
- Jim Ailinger, at the time of his death in 2001, the oldest surviving NFL alumnus.
- Ockie Anderson, teammate of Fritz Pollard on Union Club of Phoenixville in 1920 and considered one of the best forward passers of his era, winning a national title at Colgate in 1916.
- Walt Brewster
- Pete Calac, teammate of Jim Thorpe in 1920.
- Tommy Hughitt
- Heinie Miller
- Paul Robeson
- Gus Sonnenberg
- Lud Wray

== Season records ==
Season	Team	League	Regular season				Post Season Results	References
Season	Team	League	Finish	W	L	T	Post Season Results	References
Buffalo All-Stars
1915	1915	NYPFL	—	6	0	1		
1916	1916	NYPFL	—	7	3	1	Defeated Tonawanda Kardex for city title. State title disputed with Rochester Jeffersons.	
1917	1917	NYPFL	—	3	4	1	Won city title. Season cut short due to World War I.	
Buffalo Niagaras
1918	1918	BSPFL †	1st †	5	0	0	Named BSPFL Champions †	
Buffalo Prospects
1919	1919	NYPFL †	1st †	9	1	1	Named NYPFL Champions †	
Buffalo All-Americans
1920	1920	APFA	3rd	9	1	1	The APFA did not hold playoffs	
1921	1921	APFA	2nd	9	1	2	The APFA did not hold playoffs. There was a de facto championship between Buffalo and the Chicago Staleys	
1922	1922	NFL	9th	5	4	1	The NFL did not hold playoffs	
1923	1923	NFL	8th	5	4	3	The NFL did not hold playoffs	
Buffalo Bisons
1924	1924	NFL	9th	6	5	0	The NFL did not hold playoffs	
1925	1925	NFL	15th	1	6	2	The NFL did not hold playoffs	
Buffalo Rangers
1926	1926	NFL	9th	4	4	2	The NFL did not hold playoffs	
Buffalo Bisons
1927	1927	NFL	12th	0	5	0	The NFL did not hold playoffs	
1928	1928	NFL	Suspended Operations					
1929	1929	NFL	10th	1	7	1	The NFL did not hold playoffs	
