= Conshohocken Athletic Club =

American football team

General information
- Founded: 1914; 112 years ago
- Folded: 1925; 101 years ago
- Stadium: Conshohocken Community Field
- Headquartered: Conshohocken, Pennsylvania
- Colors: Orange, White

Personnel
- General manager: Bob Crawford
- Head coach: Howard Berry

Team history
- Conshohocken Athletic Club (1914-1920); Conshohocken Athletic Association (1921-1925)

League / conference affiliations
- Independent

The Conshohocken Athletic Club was a professional football team based in Conshohocken, Pennsylvania, from 1914 until 1920, when the club's financial problems made it impossible to field a team. In the fall of 1921, the newly established Conshohocken Athletic Association took over sponsorship of the team. The new Association was formed as a community-based organization with the purpose of promoting and supporting outdoor athletics and had the full support of Conshohocken Athletic Club.

Conshohocken won the mythical Schuylkill County championship in 1914, 1915 and 1916, before laying claim to the eastern Pennsylvania championship in 1919.

Conshohocken had an annual Thanksgiving rivalry with the Norristown Billikens of Norristown, Pennsylvania; from 1914 to 1916, Conshohocken beat the Billikens in all three games.

== Notable players ==
- Earl Potteiger
- Bert Yeabsley

== Season by season ==
Year	W	L	T	Finish	Coach
1914	10	0	0	Schuylkill Champs	
1915	10	0	0	Schuylkill Champs	
1916	9	1	1	Schuylkill Champs	
1917	3	2	2		
1918	0	0	0		
1919	8	0	1	E. Pennsylvania Champs	Howard Berry
1920	6	4	1		
1921	8	1	1		
1922	8	1	1		
1923	6	2	5		
1924	9	6	0		
1925	-	-	-		
