= Benny Boynton =

American football player (1898–1963)

- Boynton while attending Williams College c1920

No. 12 (1921/22) 11 (1924)
- Position: Quarterback

Personal information
- Born: December 6, 1898; Waco, Texas, U.S.
- Died: January 23, 1963 (aged 64); Waco, Texas, U.S.
- Listed height: 5 ft 10 in (1.78 m)
- Listed weight: 165 lb (75 kg)

Career information
- High school: Waco
- College: Williams College

Career history
- 1921–1922: Rochester Jeffersons (NFL)
- 1921: Washington Senators (NFL)
- 1921: Holmesburg Athletic Club (Ind.)
- 1923: Pottsville Maroons (Ind.)
- 1924: Buffalo Bisons (NFL)

Awards and highlights
- 5× All-Pro; First-team All-Pro (1921); Buffalo Eve. News: 1st team all-APFA (1921); George Halas: 2nd team all-NFL (1922); Collyers Eye Mag.: 1st team all-NFL (1924); GB Press-Gazette: 1st team all-NFL (1924); 2× Consensus All-American (1917, 1919)
- Stats at Pro Football Reference
- College Football Hall of Fame

Other information
- Military career
- Allegiance: United States
- Branch: U.S. Marines (WWI); U.S. Navy Reserve (WWII)
- Rank: Gunnery sergeant (WWI); Lt. Commander (WWII)
- Conflicts: World War I World War II

Benjamin Lee Boynton (December 6, 1898 – January 23, 1963), nicknamed "the Purple Streak", was an American professional football player during the early years of the National Football League (NFL). He was elected to the College Football Hall of Fame in 1962. He played in the NFL for the Washington Senators, Rochester Jeffersons and Buffalo Bisons.

== Early life ==
Benny was born in Waco, Texas, in 1898, to Charles and Laura Boynton. He began his football career at Waco High School in 1912. During his sophomore year, Boynton became the team's starting quarterback, and kept the job until he graduated in 1916. While playing for Waco, he had a reputation as an accomplished halfback, an accurate and strong passer, a strong punter, and an aggressive tackler on defense.

== College ==
After high school, Boynton attended Williams College in Williamstown, Massachusetts. In his sophomore year, Boynton led the school's football team to a 7–0–1 season, for their first undefeated season in school history. At the end of the season, he was honored with his first All-American selection. It was then that Ephs fan started referring to Boynton as “the Purple Streak”, a play on his quick ability and the school's colors, purple and gold.

He sat out his sophomore season of football, instead serving in World War I as a gunnery sergeant in the United States Marine Corps. He returned to college in 1919 and was named captain of the football team, as well as the basketball and baseball teams. During his senior year, Boynton led the Eastern colleges in scoring, compiling 143 points on 22 touchdowns and 9 extra points. In one game, he scored six touchdowns during a 62–0 win over Trinity College. He ran a missed field goal the length of the field, 110 yards, for a touchdown against Hamilton. After that season, Boynton was chosen to Walter Camp's All-America team.

== NFL ==
After graduating from college in 1921, Boynton took a job at Bethlehem Steel, located in Steelton, Pennsylvania. While working there, he was recruited by Leo Lyons, manager of the NFL's Rochester Jeffersons. Boynton accepted Lyons's offer to play for the Jeffs. Boynton played just three games for the Jeffs that season but still scored two touchdowns, eight extra points and a field goal. He also threw for three more scores.

With NFL contacts not being what they are today, Boynton also played with the NFL's Washington Senators during the 1921 season, scoring a touchdown and three more extra points. Also in 1921, the independent Holmesburg Athletic Club, of Philadelphia, signed Boynton for a Thanksgiving Day game against the Union Quakers of Philadelphia. During the 1922 season Boynton only played in one game with the Jeffs. Instead, he decided to play semi-pro baseball in Harrisburg, Pennsylvania. In 1923, the independent, pre-NFL version of the Pottsville Maroons added Boynton to their roster. However, he made his return to the NFL in 1924. His return though sparked a dispute between Lyons and the new owners of the Buffalo Bisons; both parties claimed to have signed Boynton for the 1924 season. An NFL executive committee was formed to settle the issue. The committee awarded Boynton's services to the Bisons.

Boynton helped lead Buffalo to a 6–2–0 season, with a clear shot at the league title. However, the team's title chances ended with a 6–3 loss to the Milwaukee Badgers. During that game Badgers' quarterback Red Dunn broke through the line and headed downfield with Boynton in pursuit. On the Buffalo 10-yard line, Dunn tried to stiff-arm Boynton. Benny grabbed Dunn's arm, swung him around and wrestled him to the ground. As the Buffalo players raced to congratulate Boynton on the tackle, coach Tommy Hughitt lectured Boynton on his tackle technique, stating that if he had pulled Dunn's arm off, Dunn still could have scored.

== After football ==
1924 marked Boynton's last season of professional football. He started an insurance business in 1925. In 1926 he returned to Texas, and helped form the Southwest Officials Association and served as the organization first president. Over the next 14 years, he officiated the many college football games. Some of his most notable games include the first Cotton Bowl Classic (then called “the Dixie Classic”) and the second Sugar Bowl. After retiring from officiating, Boynton began a broadcasting career, where he provided radio commentary for several years. he died of cancer in Waco Texas on January 23, 1963.

=== World War II ===
During World War II, Boynton served as a lieutenant commander in the United States Navy Reserve. He was appointed the Physical Training and Welfare Officer at Jacksonville Naval Air Station, where he established streamlined operating programs on several naval bases throughout the southern United States.

== Legacy ==
Rochester manager, Leo Lyons, called Boynton the second greatest football player of the era, second only to Jim Thorpe. He was elected to the College Football Hall of Fame in December 1962. A month later he died from cancer at the age of 64.
