= 1920 Rock Island Independents season =

American football team season

- Owner: booster association
- General manager: Walter Flanigan
- Head coach: Rube Ursella
- Home stadium: Douglas Park

Results
- Record: 6–2–2
- League place: T-4th in APFA
- All-Pros: 7: Fred Denfield; Dewey Lyle; Ed Novak; Obe Wenig (2nd); Ed Shaw (2nd); Walt Buland (3rd); Freeman Fitzgerald (3rd)

The 1920 Rock Island Independents season was the Rock Island Independents's thirteenth season and inaugural season in the American Professional Football Association (APFA). The Independents hosted first ever APFA/National Football League contest on September 26, 1920. After the AFPA had been formed on September 17, 1920, Douglas Park was the venue as the Independents hosted the St. Paul Ideals, winning 48–0 in the new league's first contest.

The Independents entered the season coming off a nine-win, one-loss, one-tie (9–1–1) record in 1919 as an independent team, which the team proclaimed to be the "Champions of the USA". After the 1919 season, several representatives from the Ohio League, another American football league, wanted to form a new professional league; thus, the APFA was created.

A majority of the team stayed from the 1919 team, including the coaching staff, but Keith Dooley was added to the roster. The Independents opened the season with a win against the St. Paul Ideals, a non-APFA team. This was the first game in the history of the APFA. The team played all but one game at their home field, Douglas Park, and ended the season with a 6–2–2 record, which placed the team tied-for-fourth in the league standings.

The sportswriter Bruce Copeland compiled the All-Pro list for the 1920 season. Fred Denfield, Dewey Lyle, and Ed Novak made the first-team; Obe Wenig and Ed Shaw made the second-team; and Walt Buland and Freeman Fitzgerald made the third-team. Of all the players on the roster, only Ed Healey has been enshrined in the Pro Football Hall of Fame.

== Background ==
=== The Independents in the APFA ===
Douglas Park, home of the Independents, circa 1920. Football yard lines can be seen carved in the infield grass, showing field orientation.

After the 1919 season, representatives of the Canton Bulldogs, the Cleveland Tigers, the Dayton Triangles, and the Akron Pros met on August 20, 1920, to discuss the formation of a new league. At the meeting, they tentatively agreed on a salary cap and pledged not to sign college players or players already under contract with other teams. They also agreed on a name for the circuit: the American Professional Football Conference. They then invited other professional teams to a second meeting on September 17.

At that meeting, held at Bulldogs owner Ralph Hay's Hupmobile showroom in Canton, representatives of the Rock Island Independents, the Muncie Flyers, the Decatur Staleys, the Racine Cardinals, the Massillon Tigers, the Chicago Cardinals, and the Hammond Pros agreed to join the league. Representatives of the Buffalo All-Americans and Rochester Jeffersons could not attend the meeting, but sent letters to Hay asking to be included in the league. Team representatives changed the league's name slightly to the American Professional Football Association and elected officers, installing Jim Thorpe as president. Under the new league structure, teams created their schedules dynamically as the season progressed, so there were no minimum or maximum number of games needed to be played. Representatives of each team were to vote to determine the winner of the APFA trophy.

=== Personnel changes ===
The Rock Island Independents finished 9–1–1 in their 1919 season, claiming the National Championship. For the 1920 season, the Independents added multiple players to its roster: Keith Dooley, who previously played from 1912 to 1916; Fred Denfield, Mark Devlin, and Harry Gunderson, who previously played in 1917; Ed Healey, Polly Koch, George Magerkurth, Ed Shaw, Ben Synhorst, Harry Webber, Obe Wenig, and Arnie Wyman.

The team was diminished with the departure of 1919 players Wes Bradshaw, Leland Dempsey, Al Jorgenson, Loyal Robb, Fats Smith, Red Swanson, and co-coach John Roche.

=== Players split the pot ===
The New Harper Hotel, site of the Independents' annual disbursement meeting on December 1, 1920.

The Independents were structured on a cooperative basis, rather than as a commercial enterprise with player-employees paid every week. In the evening of December 1, 1920, with the team's final game of the year over and done, a "secret meeting of officials and players" was held at the New Harper Hotel in Rock Island. The results of a day-long audit of the books by team manager Walter A. Flanigan and treasurer Zwicker were presented, showing total receipts in round figures of $29,000, expenses of $16,000, and a net surplus of $13,000.

Three players not on the roster at the end of the season were voted full shares for their work earlier in the year, with a total of 20 full shares paid. "Others who played one or two games were paid accordingly," it was noted. The original split was estimated at $660 per player (approximately $11,000 in 2025 dollars); however as a few bills remained outstanding, a portion of this was left by each member of the team until final accounts were settled.

According to a report in the Rock Island Argus, "the meeting went through without the slightest dissent, which characterized showdowns of former years." Members of the club decided to end their season as it stood, without further negotiation for post-season road games, and players began to leave Rock Island for their homes the morning after the disbursement meeting.

=== Flanigan wants out ===
Following the conclusion of the 1920 season and about one week after the team's disbursement of funds, Independents team manager Walter A. Flanigan — connected with the team since 1912 and serving as chief organizer for the past several seasons — indicated a desire to resign his position. Flanigan first approached the local post of the American Legion seeking to turn over the operation to them, stating that the post seemed the most logical successor to operate the franchise. Flanigan promised to donate one month of his time at the start of the 1921 season to help the legion post to navigate the difficulties of scheduling and any other problems of initial team organization that should arise.

A four-member committee was appointed by the Legion post to study the matter, with a report due to the organization on December 21, 1920.

== Schedule ==
Game	Date	Opponent	Result	Record	Venue	Attendance	Recap	Sources
1	September 26	St. Paul Ideals	W 48–0	1–0	Douglas Park	800	Recap	
2	October 3	Muncie Flyers	W 45–0	2–0	Douglas Park	3,110	Recap	
3	October 10	Hammond Pros	W 26–0	3–0	Douglas Park	2,554	Recap	
4	October 17	Decatur Staleys	L 0–7	3–1	Douglas Park	7,000	Recap	
5	October 24	Chicago Cardinals	W 7–0	4–1	Douglas Park	4,000	Recap	
6	October 31	Chicago Tigers	W 20–7	5–1	Douglas Park	"mists scared away several hundreds"	Recap	
7	November 7	Decatur Staleys	T 0–0	5–1–1	Douglas Park	7,000+	Recap	
8	November 11	at Chicago Thorn-Tornadoes	T 7–7	5–1–2	Monmouth Athletic Park	3,000 (sold)	Recap	
9	November 14	Dayton Triangles	L 0–21	5–2–2	Douglas Park	2,000+	Recap	
—	November 21	Canton Bulldogs	canceled					
10	November 28	Washington & Jefferson All-Stars	W 48–7	6–2–2	Douglas Park	2,500	Recap	
Note: Non-APFA teams in italics. Armistice Day: November 11.

== Standings ==
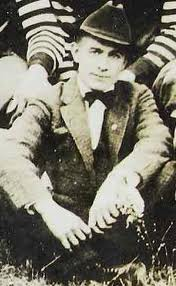
Walter Flanigan, manager of the 1920 Rock Island Independents

1920 APFA standings
	W	L	T	PCT	DIV	DPCT	PF	PA	STK
Akron Pros†	8	0	3	1.000	6–0–3	1.000	151	7	T2
Decatur Staleys	10	1	2	.909	5–1–2	.833	164	21	T1
Buffalo All-Americans	9	1	1	.900	4–1–1	.800	258	32	T1
Chicago Cardinals	6	2	2	.750	3–2–1	.600	101	29	T1
Rock Island Independents	6	2	2	.750	4–2–1	.667	201	49	W1
Dayton Triangles	5	2	2	.714	4–2–2	.667	150	54	L1
Rochester Jeffersons	6	3	2	.667	0–1–0	.000	156	57	T1
Canton Bulldogs	7	4	2	.636	4–3–1	.571	208	57	W1
Detroit Heralds	2	3	3	.400	1–3–0	.250	53	82	T2
Cleveland Tigers	2	4	2	.333	1–4–2	.200	28	46	L1
Chicago Tigers	2	5	1	.286	1–5–1	.167	49	63	W1
Hammond Pros	2	5	0	.286	0–3–0	.000	41	154	L3
Columbus Panhandles	2	6	2	.250	0–5–0	.000	41	121	W1
Muncie Flyers	0	1	0	.000	0–1–0	.000	0	45	L1

† Awarded the Brunswick-Balke Collender Cup and named APFA Champions
by vote of league owners. Staleys claimed a co-title.

== Game summaries ==
=== Game 1: vs. St. Paul Ideals ===
	1	2	3	4	Total
Ideals	0	0	0	0	0
Independents	14	14	14	6	48

September 26, 1920, at Douglas Park, Rock Island, Illinois

To start its 1920 season, the Independents played the first game in the history of the league against the non-APFA St. Paul Ideals. This was the Ideals' second game of the season, coming off a 14–7 victory the week prior. Coach Flanigan had Fred Chicken, Bobby Marshall, and Freeman Fitzgerald—the 1919 Independents' main stars—in reserve in case he needed to play them. The Independents shutout the Ideals, winning 48–0. Every touchdown by the Independents were rushing. In the first quarter, Ed Novak and Chicken both scored; Novak and Jerry Mansfield scored in the second quarter. The Independents scored 14 points in the third quarter with touchdowns from Ray Kuehl and Mansfield. In the final quarter, Kuehl scored the Independents' last points of the game.

=== Game 2: vs. Muncie Flyers ===
	1	2	3	4	Total
Flyers	0	0	0	0	0
Independents	21	10	7	7	45

October 3, 1920, at Douglas Park

Next up, the Green and White faced the Muncie Flyers — reckoned to be one of the first games featuring two APFA teams. As the Columbus Panhandles played against the Dayton Triangles on the same day it is unknown which of the two games started first. In the first quarter, the Independents scored three touchdowns: two from Arnold Wyman and one from Rube Ursella. In the second quarter, Ursella scored kicked a 25-yard field goal, and Wyman scored from an 86-yard kickoff return. In the third quarter, Sid Nichols had a 5-yard rushing touchdown, and Waddy Kuehl scored a 7-yard rushing touchdown. The final score of the game was 45–0. This game was the only one that counted towards the Flyers' standing for the entire 1920 season.

=== Game 3: vs. Hammond Pros ===
	1	2	3	4	Total
Pros	0	0	0	0	0
Independents	0	13	0	13	26

October 10, 1920, at Douglas Park

This was the Pros' first game of the 1920 season. There were no scores by either team in the first or third quarters, but the Independents scored 13 points in the second and fourth. Back Fred Chicken scored a 1-yard rushing touchdown; back Ray Kuehl scored two touchdowns: a 5-yard rushing touchdown and a 35-yard receiving touchdown from back Pudge Wyman; and back Gerald Mansfield caught a 20-yard receiving touchdown from Wyman. Hammond started to purposely injure their opponents during the game. As a result, Rube Ursella suffered a twisted knee. Duey Lyle was kicked in the face and required seven stitches. Lastly, Ed Healey was kicked in the face and needed five stitches in the cheek.

=== Game 4: vs. Decatur Staleys ===
	1	2	3	4	Total
Staleys	0	7	0	0	7
Independents	0	0	0	0	0

October 17, 1920, at Douglas Park

In week 4, the Independents played the Decatur Staleys. After two games against non-APFA teams, the Staleys played against an APFA team. Late in the first quarter, the Independents' Freeman Fitzgerald forced a fumble on Jimmy Conzelman; Fitzgerald retrieved it at the 49 yard line. The Independents drove the ball down the field, and the Staleys' players were tired. As a result, they called a timeout. With possession on 23, Arnie Wyman rushed for 10 yards, and the Independents were in the Red zone. The first quarter ended there. Wyman took the next snap and fumbled as he was tackled. George Trafton recovered the ball at the 8 yard mark. Later in the quarter, Conzelman scored the only touchdown in the game.

In the third quarter, Fred Chicken intercepted a Staley pass on the Independents' 28. Early in the fourth quarter, the Staleys drove to the Independents' 14, where they lined up for a field goal. Wyman blocked the kick, however. The Independents next possession resulted in a punt, and the Staleys started the possession at their own 7 yard line. On this possession, Kuehl intercepted a pass. The Independents attempted a Hail Mary pass late in the game, but it was unsuccessful. The game ended a few minutes later with the Staleys with possession.

=== Game 5: vs. Chicago Cardinals ===
	1	2	3	4	Total
Cardinals	0	0	0	0	0
Independents	0	7	0	0	7

October 24, 1920, at Douglas Park

Coming off their first loss of the season, the Independents played against the Chicago Cardinals in week 5, with 4,000 spectators in attendance. The Independents out-gained the Cardinals in yards; the Independents had 263 total yards while the opponent had 153. The only score was in the second quarter when Wyman caught a 6-yard receiving touchdown from Nichols, making the final score 7–0. This was the first loss of the season for the Cardinals.

=== Game 6: vs. Chicago Tigers ===
	1	2	3	4	Total
Tigers	0	7	0	0	7
Independents	6	0	7	7	20

October 31, 1920, at Douglas Park

In week six, the Independents played the Chicago Tigers. The Independents out-gained the Tigers in first downs, 14 to 3. The first score of the game was a 6-yard rushing touchdown by Chicken; however, the extra point was missed, so the score was only 6–0. The Tigers took the lead in the second quarter after Dunc Annan had a 2-yard rushing touchdown. Chicken ended up having two rushing touchdowns, and Wyman had another rushing touchdown, as the Independents beat the Tigers 20–7.

=== Game 7: vs. Decatur Staleys ===
	1	2	3	4	Total
Staleys	0	0	0	0	0
Independents	0	0	0	0	0

November 7, 1920, at Douglas Park

On a five-game winning streak, the Staleys played against the Independents again. The game ended in a 0–0 tie. Several injuries occurred throughout the game for the Independents. Sid Nichols, Fred Chicken, and Oak Smith injured their knees on different plays. Harry Gunderson was hit late by George Traften and the former had to get thirteen stitches on his face, and his hand was broken.

=== Game 8: at Chicago Thorn-Tornadoes ===
	1	2	3	4	Total
Independents	0	0	0	7	7
Thorn-Tornadoes	0	0	0	7	7

November 11, 1920, at Monmouth College Athletic Park

With Rock Island depleted by injury at the hands of "Staley's butchers," the Independents would have cancelled this first road game of the season had there not been a binding contract in place, according to Argus sportswriter Bruce Copeland. Instead, a set of "makeshift Independents" took the field in Monmouth, Illinois, to play the Chicago Thorns-Tornadoes in bitterly cold and windy conditions. In acknowledgement of the miserable weather and the "comparative handful" of the presale of 3,000 tickets that braved the day, the teams decided to have 10-minute quarters. The game was a tie for the first three quarters. Things broke open in the fourth period, however, when Kuehl muffed a punt while standing at his own 20. Mooney of the Thorn-Tornadoes picked up the football and ran it back for a touchdown with only 3 minutes left in the game. At this time, Ursella was substituted for Kuehl. After a kickoff return to the 44 yard mark, the Independents used Novak, Mansfield, and Jordan to help score before time expired. Ursella kicked the game-tying extra point to end the game a 7–7 tie.

=== Game 9: vs. Dayton Triangles ===
	1	2	3	4	Total
Triangles	7	0	0	14	21
Independents	0	0	0	0	0

November 14, 1920, at Douglas Park

For their second game in week eight, the Independents played against the Dayton Triangles. The Independents had six players returning from injuries this game. In the first quarter, Rube Ursella for the Independents fumbled a punt on the 40 yard line, and the Triangles gained possession. On that possession, Frank Bacon scored a rushing touchdown. The Independents controlled the football for a majority of the second quarter. On their final possession of the half, they managed to take the ball to just four inches outside the Triangles' goal line, but the referee signaled to end the first half. In the fourth quarter, Ed Novack and Arnold Wyman left the game due to injury. The Triangles scored two passing touchdowns in the final 10 minutes of the game; the first was caught by Dave Reese, and the second was caught by Roudebush.

=== Game 10: vs. Washington & Jefferson All-Stars ===
	1	2	3	4	Total
All-Stars	0	0	7	0	7
Independents	14	20	7	7	48

November 28, 1920, at Douglas Park

A game against Jim Thorpe's Canton Bulldogs had been originally scheduled for Sunday, November 21, but a series of injuries to Rock Island's starting eleven forced a postponement of the Douglas Field game to November 28. It was anticipated that new players would be brought in to supplant the team's crippled backfield, with Green and White manager Walter Flanagan reportedly free to borrow stars from the Dayton Triangles and Chicago Tigers for the game. Finances intervened, however, when on November 19 it was announced that Canton owner Jim Thorpe was canceling the game for economic reasons, despite having been offered a $4,000 guarantee.

Another game of the season was hastily organized for the open November 28 date. Fortunately, about three weeks previously J.F. Mulaney of the Wheeling Steel and Iron Corporation had worked with team captain Garbisch of Washington and Jefferson College to organize an All-Star football team with a view to facing either the Canton Bulldogs or the Akron Pros in a post-season game. Mulaney and Garbisch had been unable to get either of those teams to commit to playing, however.

The Washington and Jefferson All-Star team had already been signed for an as-yet unannounced December 5 visit to Rock Island to play the Independents. The November 28 date had proved difficult to fill, with first Akron and then Canton canceling planned games in Rock Island on that date. With that Sunday slot once again open, team manager Flanagan contacted Mulaney and had the game with the collegiate stars moved up one week.

This impromptu assemblage — remembered in historic accounts variously as the "Pittsburgh All-Collegians," "the Wheeling Collegians," or the "Washington and Jefferson All-Stars" — proved a chimera. Most players from the All-Collegians did not show up for the game, and the coach used people from the crowd to form a team.

The first score of the game came in the first quarter when Wenig blocked a punt and returned it for a touchdown. The only points the All-Collegians scored was a blocked punt from Morris, who returned it for a touchdown. The game ended with a 48–7 victory for the Independents.

== Postseason ==
Since there were no playoff system in the APFA until 1932, a meeting was held to determine the 1920 APFA Champions. Each team that showed up had a vote to determine the champions. The Akron Pros were awarded the Brunswick-Balke Collender Cup on April 30, 1921. Ties were not counted in standings until 1972, which is why Akron is credited with a 1.000 winning percentage. The Independents tied for fourth place in the standings. The sportswriter Bruce Copeland compiled the All-Pro list for the 1920 season. Denfield, Lyle, and Novak made the first-team; Wenig and Shaw made the second-team; and Buland and Fitzgerald made the third-team. Of all the players on the roster, only Healey has been enshrined in the Pro Football Hall of Fame.

== Roster ==
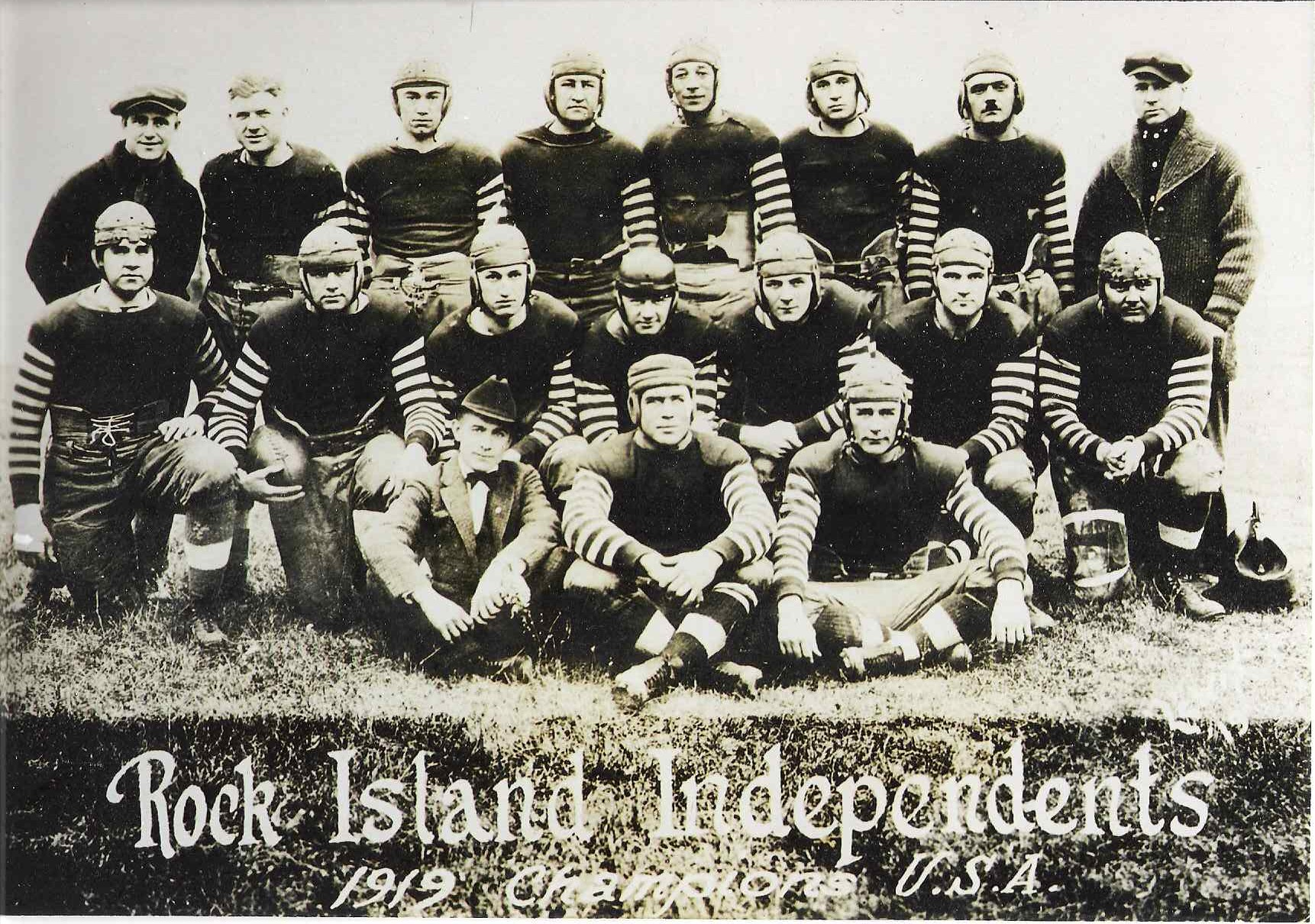
Team photograph of the 1919 Rock Island Independents, when the team claimed the USA Championship.

Rock Island Independents 1920 roster
Backs: Fred Chicken; Mark Devlin; Tom Henry; Waddy Kuehl; Jerry Mansfield FB; Sid Nichols; Ed Novak; Paddy Quinn; Ed Shaw; Rube Ursella; Arnold Wyman	Linemen: Walt Buland RT; Fred Denfield LT; Freeman Fitzgerald C; Harry Gunderson C; Ed Healey T; Polly Koch RG; Dewey Lyle LT; George Magerkurth LG; Bobby "Rube" Marshall RE; Charlie Mockmore G; Ben Synhorst T; Oak Smith LE; Harry Webber E; Obe Wenig E; Guido Wyland LG	Coaching Staff: Rube Ursella – Head Coach; Walter Flanagan – Manager
