= 1919 Rock Island Independents season =

American football team season

- General manager: Walter Flanigan
- Head coach: Rube Ursella
- Home stadium: Douglas Park

Results
- Record: 9–1–1

The 1919 Rock Island Independents season was the last time that the team played independently, before joining the early National Football League the following year. Playing all of their games at home in front of a friendly crowd, the team only allowed their opponents to score in two of their eleven games and posted a 9–1–1 record, proclaiming themselves "Champions of the USA".

== Background ==
=== An offer rejected ===
Douglas Park, home of the Independents, circa 1920. Football yard lines can be seen carved in the infield grass, showing field orientation.

The Independents traditionally made use of a 60-40 split of gate proceeds with visitors, but sought to hustle the neighboring Moline Fans' Association club with a winner-takes-all offer made ahead of the season. Moline declined the kind inquiry and eventually met Rock Island on November 9, losing 20–9 but getting paid for their efforts.

=== Nothing like an uneven matchup ===
Coach Ursella of the Independents announced the closing of practice on September 16, seemingly gearing up secret plans to use in the warm-up opener scheduled a fortnight hence against the Rockford Amateur Athletic Club. The Independents managed to eke out a 20-0 shutout over their token opposition.

=== Fair weather fans? ===
As the wins began to accumulate and the weather started to turn cold, the Rock Island Argus began to actively promote the Independents to their readers. Following a 40–0 shellacking of the Columbus Panhandles, the paper ran a five-inch article headed "Fans Just Don't Appreciate Team," upbraiding locals for failing to support "the best football in the country at the lowest prices." Declaring — falsely — that teams in the East averaged a turnout of 9,000 at twice the ticket price, the Argus editorialist declared "Wake up fans! Give the team its due. Akron is coming...and must be assured a huge amount for its appearance so far from home. If you want Canton after that, you will show it on Sunday."

Akron came, all right, but so did frigid temperatures, and only 1,700 fans could be persuaded to sit in the cold watching their Green-and-Whites shut out the Indians, 17–0.

=== The "World Championship" game ===
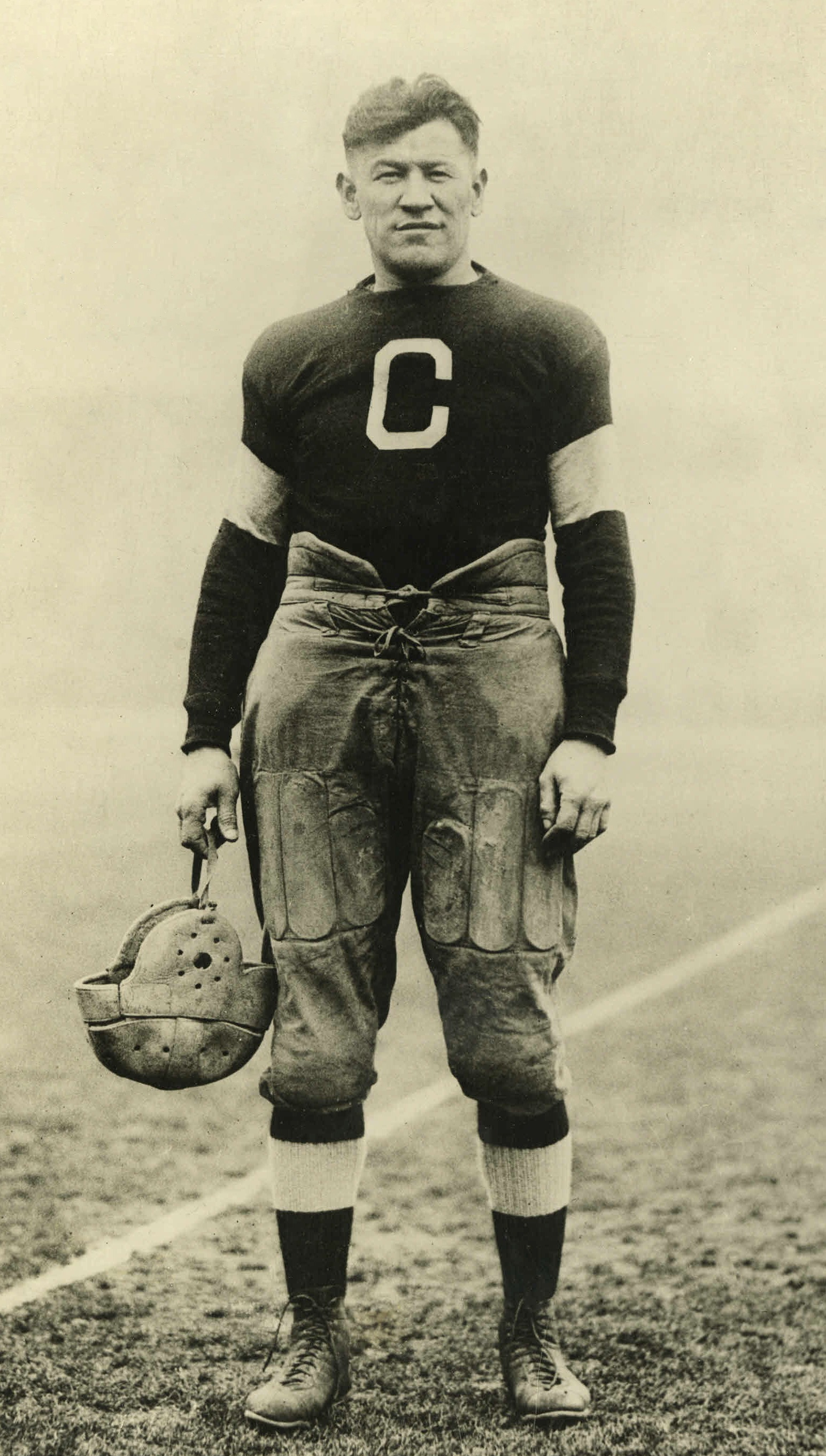
Halfback Jim Thorpe, one of the most famous athletes of his era, in the uniform of the Canton Bulldogs.

This apparent financial disaster did not immediately bring an end to the 1919 season, however, as after the game Independents manager Walter Flanigan boldly announced receipt of a telegram from his counterpart in Canton, Ralph Hay: "No game scheduled for Sunday. Will come to Rock Island."

A $5,000 guarantee was necessary, and 5,000 tickets were immediately put up for sale with a $2 face value for this final game of the season, touted as the "championship of the world."

The ticket sale started strong, with local merchants buying tickets en bloc and individual orders flooding in. After just one day, Canton's $5,000 guarantee was already covered, the Argus stated, and "the management anticipates little trouble in getting rid of the other 2,500."

The newspaper pushed its readers hard: "It isn't every day, every year, or every decade that Middle-Western people get a chance to see a game such as is coming Sunday, a contest between the biggest professional teams in the country for head place of the nation — which is the same thing as championship of the world."

The dream of an epic finale came to an end on Wednesday, December 3, however, when Canton manager Hay announced that despite Rock Island's agreement to meet the guarantee, the Bulldog team had been disbanded and it would therefore be impossible to meet in Rock Island. Rock Island responded to the news with taunting telegrams to Hay and Canton star Jim Thorpe, emphasizing the $5,000 guarantee would represent "the largest your team has ever received before" and that "if you don't accept, Rock Island fans will say you are quitters."

Hay and Thorpe dodged long distance phone calls made to beg reconsideration. Despite a last-second effort to sweeten the pot by upping Canton's guarantee to $7,000, the Canton disbandment was irreversible. The game was officially canceled on Thursday, and all ticket-holders were refunded.

In a rush Rock Island's Walter Flanigan attempted to fill the date with a game against an all-star team from Hammond, Indiana. This was cancelled almost immediately when a snow storm hit the area, rendering the field unplayable. The season was officially ended.

=== End-of-season summary ===
The Islanders finished their 1919 season with a record of 9 wins, 1 loss, and 1 tie. Playing every game in the friendly confines of Douglas Park, Rock Island outscored their opponents 251 to 21 for the year, holding the visitors scoreless nine times.

The team held its annual end-of-season business meeting the evening of December 12, 1919, at Harper House, with boosters encouraged to attend to help with planning for the 1920 season.

The Independents were organized cooperatively rather than on a conventional employer–employee basis, with net proceeds for the season pooled and split by the team's players. A total of $8,100 was divided, including slightly more than $1,000 contributed by free-will donations of local fans and community businesses, with a payout of $455 per player for the 11-game season indicated.

The decision was made to increase ticket prices next year, with a face value of $1.50 anticipated for the 1920 season.

== Schedule ==
Game	Date	Opponent	Result	Record	Venue	Attendance	Sources
1	September 28	Rockford A.A.C.	W 20–0	1–0	Douglas Park	2,000	
2	October 5	Chicago Cornell-Hamburgs	T 0–0	1–0–1	Douglas Park	~2,500	
—	October 12	St. Paul Seaton A.C.	canceled				
3	October 12	Hammond All-Stars	L 7–12	1–1–1	Douglas Park	5,000+	
4	October 19	Davenport A.C.	W 33–0	2–1–1	Douglas Park	6,000	
5	October 26	Cincinnati Celts	W 33–0	3–1–1	Douglas Park	3,000	
6	November 2	Pine Village, Indiana	T 0–0	3–1–2	Douglas Park	4,000+	
7	November 9	Moline Fans Association	W 20–9	4–1–2	Douglas Park	< 2,000	
—	November 11	Detroit Heralds	canceled by Rock Island				
—	November 16	St. Louis Parks	canceled				
8	November 16	Hammond A.A. Clabbys	W 55–0	5–1–2	Douglas Park	2,000	
9	November 23	Columbus Panhandles	W 40–0	6–1–2	Douglas Park	< 4,500	
10	November 27	Davenport A.C.	W 26–0	7–1–2	Douglas Park	1,500	
11	November 30	Akron Indians	W 17–0	8–1–2	Douglas Park	1,700	
—	December 7	Canton Bulldogs	canceled by Canton				
—	December 7	Hammond All-Stars	canceled due to snow				
Note: Armistice Day: November 11. Thanksgiving Day: November 27.

== Roster ==
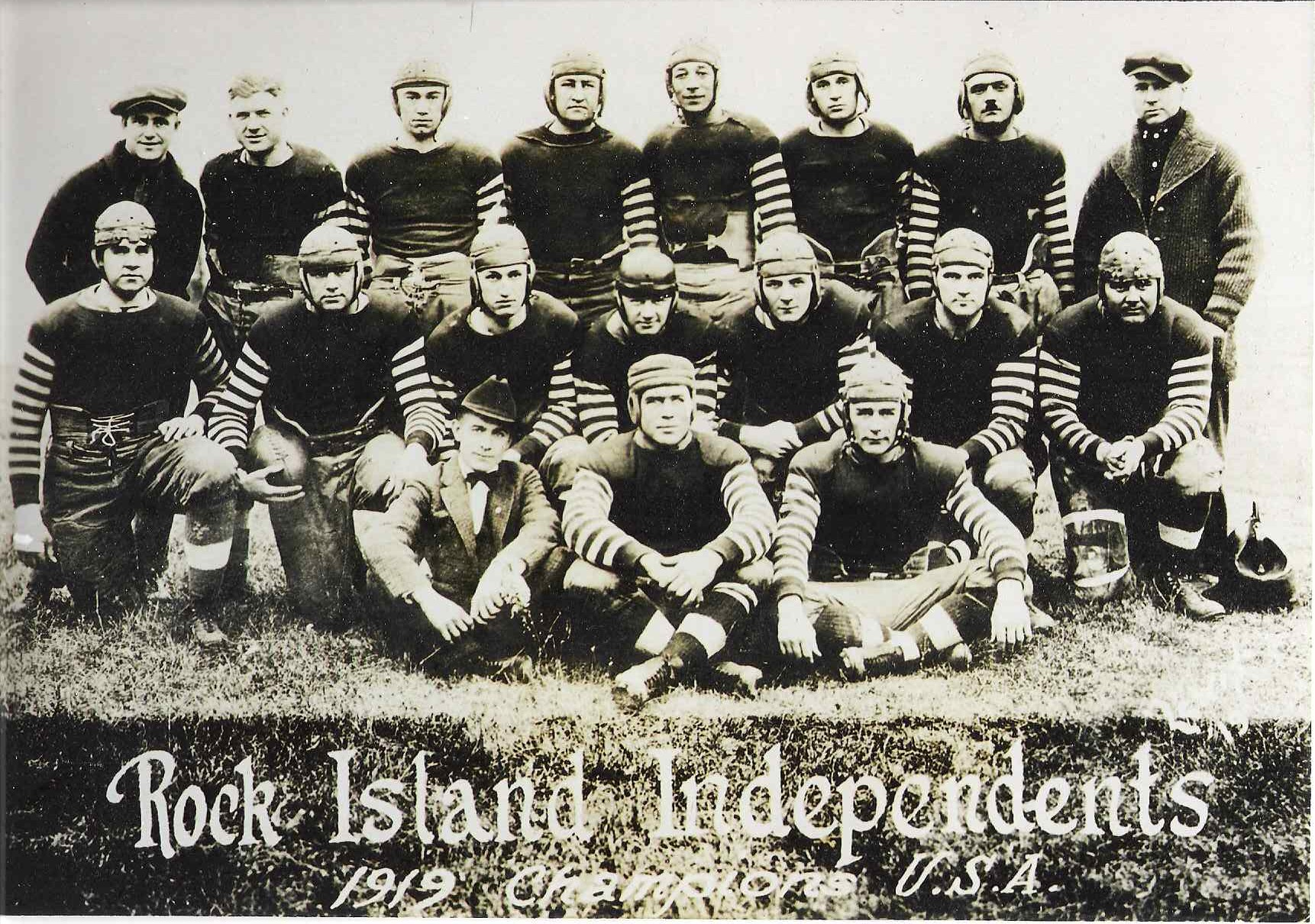
Team photo of the 1919 Rock Island Independents

The following players saw action in at least one game for the 1919 Rock Island Independents. The number of 1919 game appearances by each follows in parentheses.

Rube Ursella in the uniform of the Green-and-Whites.

Linemen

- Mose Bashaw (3)
- Walt Buland (11)
- Lee Dempsey (2)
- Freeman Fitzgerald (8)
- Bob Fosdick (4)
- Harry Hunzelman (1)
- Dewey Lyle (11)
- Bobby Marshall (9)
- Loyal Robb (5)
- Fat Smith (8)
- Oak Smith (10)
- Pudge Wyland (11)

Backs

- Fred Chicken (9)
- Tom Henry (10)
- Al Jorgenson (2)
- Jerry Mansfield (11)
- Eddie Novak (7)
- Paddy Quinn (6)
- Ed Swanson (3)
- Rube Ursella (11)
