= 1920 APFA season =

American football season

1920 NFL season
Regular season
- Duration: September 26 – December 19, 1920
- Champions: Akron Pros

APFA teams

The 1920 APFA season was the inaugural season of the American Professional Football Association, direct lineal forerunner of the National Football League, reorganized as such in 1922. The Association included 14 teams from the Midwest and Northeast during its inaugural season. Teams scheduled their own games, including contests against non-APFA opponents, with the champion to be determined by a vote of league owners rather than through raw winning percentage.

At the league meeting held on April 30, 1921, the Akron Pros were awarded the Brunswick-Balke Collender Cup as champions for the 1920 season, the only year the trophy was used.

== History ==
=== First meeting ===
Prior to the APFA, there were several other loose, professional organizations; most of the APFA teams were from either the Ohio League or the New York Pro Football League. On August 20, 1920, a meeting attended by representatives of four Ohio League teams — Ralph Hay and Jim Thorpe for the Canton Bulldogs, Jimmy O'Donnell and Stan Cofall for the Cleveland Tigers, Carl Storck for the Dayton Triangles, and Frank Nied and Art Ranney for the Akron Pros — was held. At this initial session held at Ralph Hay's office in Canton, Ohio, the club representatives tentatively agreed to call their new league the American Professional Football Conference (APFC), to introduce a salary cap for the teams, and not to sign college players nor players under contract with another team. Plans were tentatively made by the four clubs to play one another "home and away,' creating a uniform six game schedule for each team.

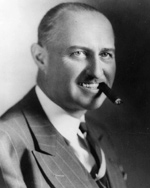
Ralph Hay, one of the founding league owners.

According to the Canton Evening Repository, the purpose of the league was to "raise the standard of professional football in every way possible, to eliminate bidding for players between rival clubs and to secure cooperation in the formation of schedules, at least for the bigger teams." The representatives then contacted other major professional teams and invited them to a meeting for September 17.

=== Organizational meeting ===
Word of the new organization spread. A second meeting including an expanded circle of interested teams was called to Canton on September 17, 1920, for the purpose of formal organization. Participants included the original four APFC clubs, as well as a fifth Ohio team, the Columbus Panhandles that had played together with these teams in what historians later dubbed the "Ohio League"; four teams from Illinois (the Chicago Cardinals and Chicago Tigers, Decatur Staleys, and Rock Island Independents); two from Indiana (the Hammond Pros and Muncie Flyers); two from New York (the Buffalo All-Americans and Rochester Jeffersons); and the Detroit Heralds from Michigan. These 14 founding teams determined to form a formal association known as the American Professional Football Association (APFA).

Jim Thorpe, player-coach of the Canton Bulldogs, was named the APFA's first president — more for the publicity associated with his famous name than for any particular administrative prowess. A franchise admission fee of $100 was adopted — although George S. Halas, player-coach of the Chicago Staleys, later recalled that "I can testify that no money changed hands" between the 14 founding adopters.

Writing in 1978, a team of gridiron historians noted that

"This new organization did not resemble a league as we would know it today, but was more like a professional association whose sole functions were membership and articulation of some general principles. Perhaps the best modern-day analogy would be a weak form of the NCAA. As can be imagined, the league office had no influence on anybody. It set no schedules, leaving each team to arrange its own slate."

Since scheduling was left in the hands of each team, there were wide variations from club to club in the total number of games played, the number played against fellow association members, and the strength of opponents added to the schedule. Traditional local rivalries were maintained, regardless of affiliation. For example, the Rochester Jeffersons played a schedule consisting mostly of local teams from their local sandlot circuit and the New York Professional Football League, playing but one game against an APFA opponent.

Indeed, of the 90 games played by APFA teams during the football season of 1920, 51 were against teams not affiliated with the APFA. No official standings were maintained by the association or published in the press, with later standings for the APFA teams assembled and published by football historians after the fact. Because most APFA games played in 1920 matched teams from the same geographic area, fans in different regions had different opinions of who the league champion was — with the final determination to be made by a meeting of team owners held during the winter after completion of the season.

=== Teams ===
The APFA had 14 teams that played during its inaugural season.

Team folded this season

Team	Owner	Head coach	Stadium(s)
Akron Pros	Fred Nied, Art Ranney	Elgie Tobin	Akron League Park
Buffalo All-Americans	Frank McNeil	Tommy Hughitt	Canisius Villa (7), Buffalo Baseball Park (3)
Canton Bulldogs	Ralph Hay	Jim Thorpe	Lakeside Park
Chicago Cardinals	Chris O'Brien	Paddy Driscoll	Normal Park
Chicago Tigers	Guil Falcon	Guil Falcon	Cubs Park
Cleveland Tigers	Stan Cofall, Jimmy O'Donnell	Stan Cofall (3 games), Al Pierotti (5 games)	Dunn Field
Columbus Panhandles	Joe Carr	Ted Nesser	Neil Park
Dayton Triangles	Carl Storck	Bud Talbott	Triangle Park
Decatur Staleys	A. E. Staley	George Halas	Staley Field
Detroit Heralds	Detroit Herald newspaper	Billy Marshall	Navin Field
Hammond Pros	Doc Young	Hank Gillo	Traveling team
Muncie Flyers	Earl Ball, Cooney Checkaye	Ken Huffine	Traveling team
Rochester Jeffersons	Leo Lyons	Jack Forsyth	Rochester Baseball Park
Rock Island Independents	Walter Flanigan, booster association	Rube Ursella	Douglas Park

== Season review ==
The regular-season schedule was not fixed but was created dynamically by each team as the season progressed. The first game involving an APFA team occurred on September 26, when the Rock Island Independents beat the St. Paul Ideals 48–0.

The first official game between APFA (NFL) members occurred on October 3, when the Dayton Triangles beat the Columbus Panhandles 14–0. The Triangles' Lou Partlow scored the league's first touchdown and George "Hobby" Kinderline kicked the first extra point. An historic marker placed by the Ohio Historical Society at Triangle Park in Dayton marks the location of that first ever game.

Although both the Dayton Triangles and the Rock Island Independents hosted matchups on October 3, 1920, that are recognized as the first games played between two league franchises, localized contemporary newspaper records show that the Dayton game kicked off first. Because both cities operated on Central Standard Time (CST) in October 1920, Dayton's scheduled 2:30 PM CST kickoff preceded Rock Island's 3:04 PM CST kickoff by 34 minutes.

The final game of the season was a 14–14 tie between the Chicago Cardinals and the non-league Chicago Stayms on December 19, 1920. The Decatur Staleys and the Canton Bulldogs played the most games in the season (13), while the Muncie Flyers played the fewest (1). The Buffalo All-Americans scored the most points all season (258), and the Akron Pros allowed the fewest points (7).

1920 APFA teams' roster photos

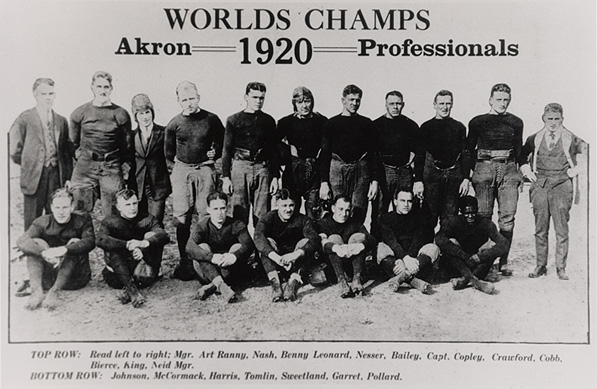
Akron Pros

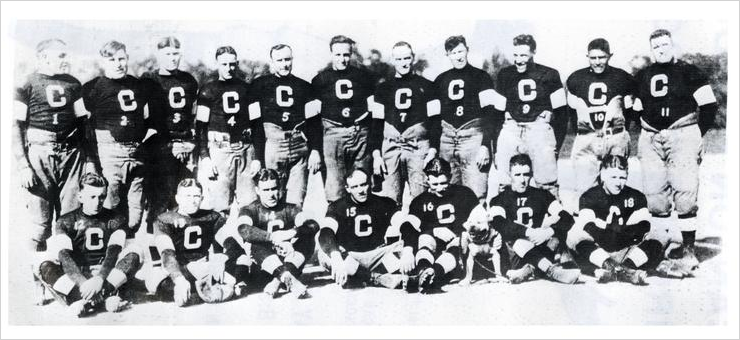
Canton Bulldogs

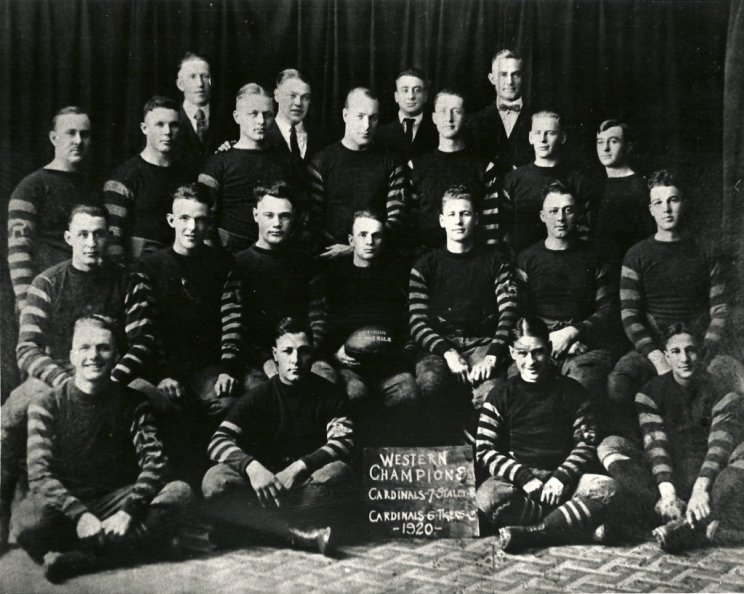
Chicago Cardinals

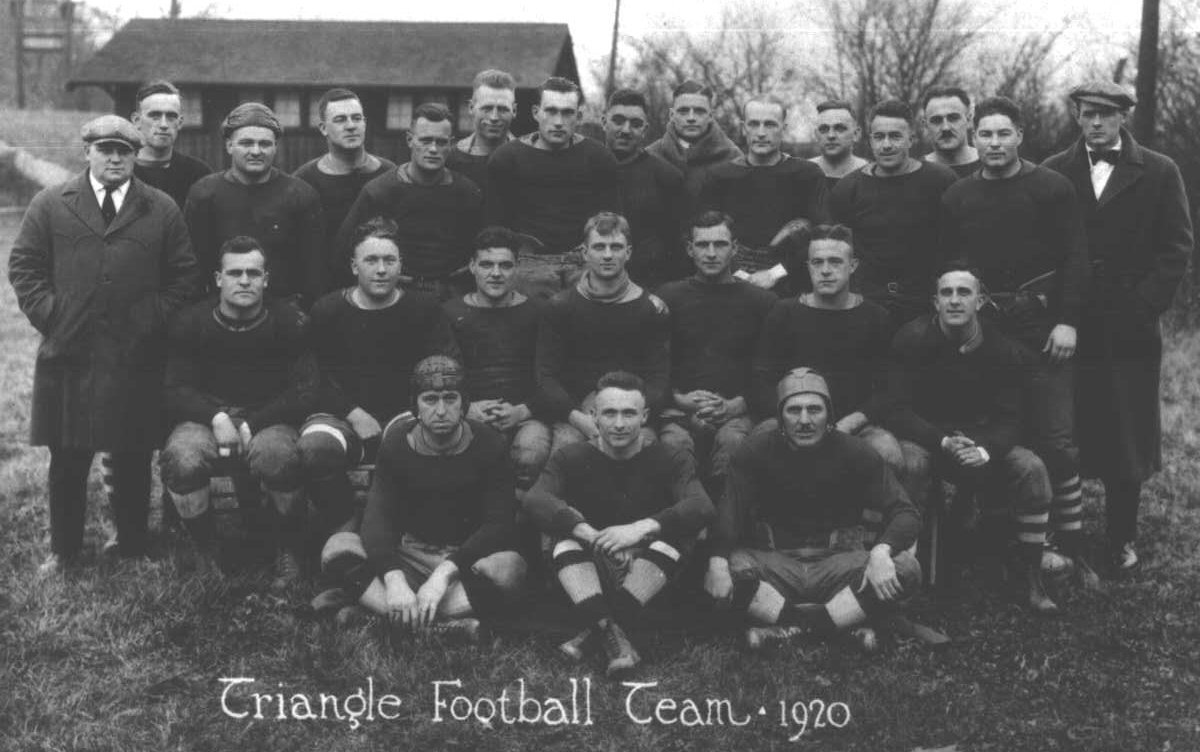
Dayton Triangles

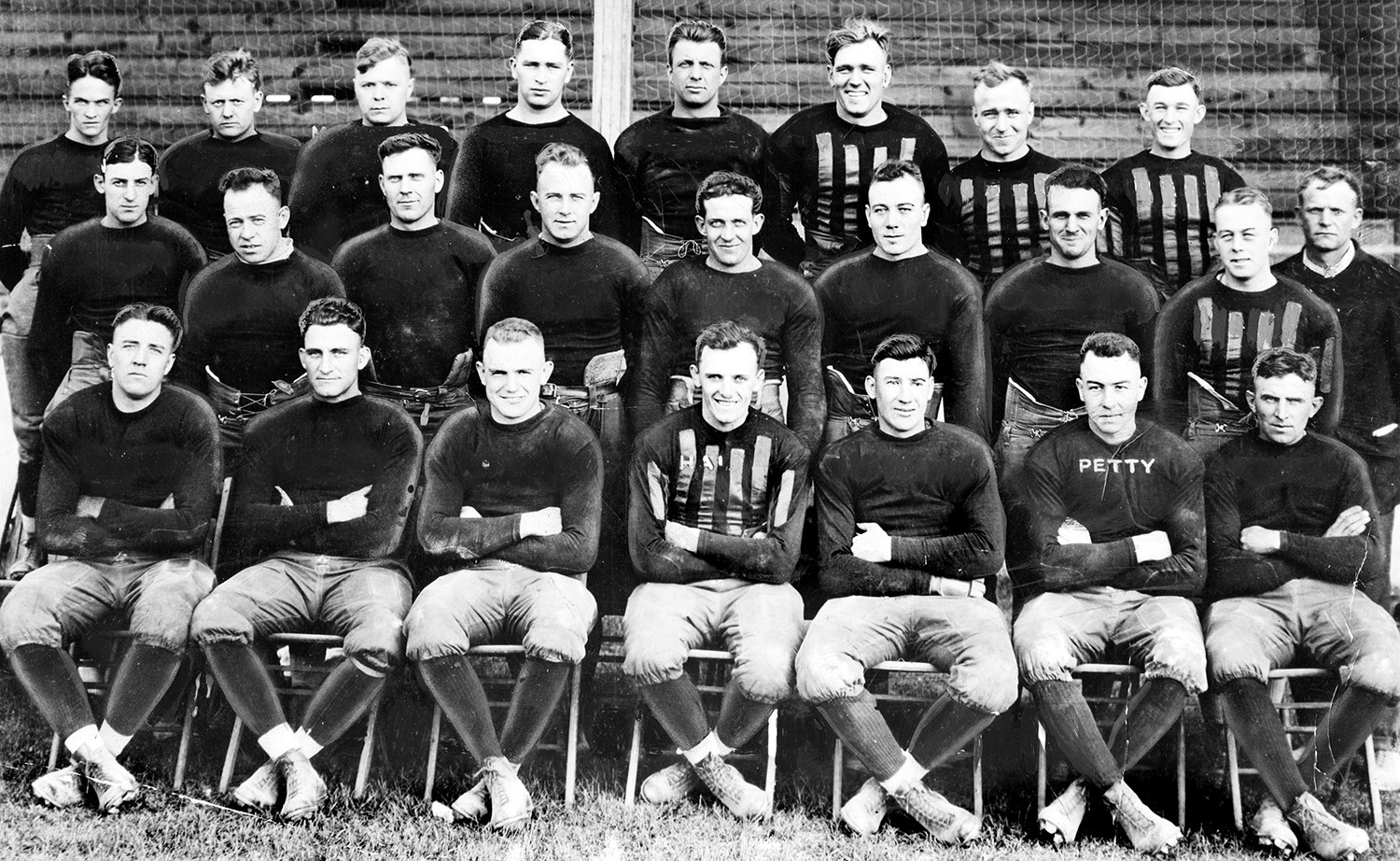
Decatur Staleys

Key
Symbol	Meaning
Highlighted	APFA game
†	Non-APFA team
(numbers in parentheses)	Team's win–loss–tie record

September 26, 1920
Visitor	Score	Home	Score	Location
St. Paul Ideals†	0	Rock Island Independents (1–0–0)	48	Douglas Park
October 3, 1920
Wheeling Stogies†	0	Akron Pros (1–0–0)	43	Akron League Park
West Buffalo†	6	Buffalo All-Americans (1–0–0)	32	Canisius Field
Pitcairn Quakers†	0	Canton Bulldogs (1–0–0)	48	Lakeside Park
Columbus Panhandles (0–1–0)	0	Dayton Triangles (1–0–0)	14	Triangle Park
Moline Universal Tractors†	0	Decatur Staleys (1–0–0)	20	Staley Field
Muncie Flyers (0–1–0)	0	Rock Island Independents (2–0–0)	45	Douglas Park
All-Buffalo†	0	Rochester Jeffersons (1–0–0)	10	Rochester Baseball Park
October 10, 1920
Columbus Panhandles (0–2–0)	0	Akron Pros (2–0–0)	37	Akron League Park
All-Buffalo†	0	Buffalo All-Americans (2–0–0)	51	Canisius Field
Toledo Maroons†	0	Canton Bulldogs (2–0–0)	42	Lakeside Park
Racine Cardinals (0–0–1)	0	Chicago Tigers (0–0–1)	0	Cubs Park
Cleveland Tigers (0–0–1)	0	Dayton Triangles (1–0–1)	0	Triangle Park
Kewanee Walworths†	7	Decatur Staleys (2–0–0)	25	Staley Field
Cleveland Panthers†	14	Detroit Heralds (1–0–0)	40	Mack Park
Hammond Pros (0–1–0)	0	Rock Island Independents (3–0–0)	26	Douglas Park
Fort Porter†	0	Rochester Jeffersons (2–0–0)	66	Rochester Baseball Park
October 17, 1920
Cincinnati Celts†	0	Akron Pros (3–0–0)	13	Akron League Park
McKeesport Olympics†	7	Buffalo All-Americans (3–0–0)	28	Canisius Field
Cleveland Tigers (0–1–1)	0	Canton Bulldogs (3–0–0)	7	Lakeside Park
Moline Universal Tractors†	3	Racine Cardinals (1–0–1)	33	St. Rita's Field
Detroit Heralds (1–1–0)	0	Chicago Tigers (1–0–1)	12	Cubs Park
Columbus Panhandles (0–3–0)	0	Fort Wayne Friars†	14	Fort Wayne League Park
Hammond Pros (0–2–0)	0	Dayton Triangles (2–0–1)	44	Triangle Park
Decatur Staleys (3–0–0)	7	Rock Island Independents (3–1–0)	0	Douglas Park
Utica Knights of Columbus†	0	Rochester Jeffersons (2–0–1)	0	Rochester Baseball Park
October 24, 1920
Cleveland Tigers (0–2–1)	0	Akron Pros (4–0–0)	7	Akron League Park
Toledo Maroons†	0	Buffalo All-Americans (4–0–0)	38	Canisius Field
Canton Bulldogs (3–0–1)	20	Dayton Triangles (2–0–2)	20	Triangle Park
Racine Cardinals (1–1–1)	0	Rock Island Independents (4–1–0)	7	Douglas Park
Decatur Staleys (4–0–0)	10	Chicago Tigers (1–1–1)	0	Cubs Park
Columbus Panhandles (0–4–0)	0	Detroit Heralds (2–1–0)	6	Mack Park
Syracuse Stars†	7	Rochester Jeffersons (3–0–1)	21	Rochester Baseball Park
October 31, 1920
Akron Pros (5–0–0)	10	Canton Bulldogs (3–1–1)	0	Lakeside Park
Rochester Jeffersons (3–1–1)	6	Buffalo All-Americans (5–0–0)	17	Canisius Field
Detroit Heralds (2–2–0)	0	Racine Cardinals (2–1–1)	21	Cubs Park
Chicago Tigers (1–2–1)	7	Rock Island Independents (5–1–0)	20	Douglas Park
Columbus Panhandles (0–5–0)	0	Cleveland Tigers (1–2–1)	7	Dunn Field
Cincinnati Celts †	7	Dayton Triangles (3–0–2)	23	Triangle Park
Decatur Staleys (5–0–0)	29	Rockford A.C.†	0	Kishwaukee Park
Hammond Pros (1–2–0)	14	Logan Square†	9	Logan Square Park
November 7, 1920
All-Tonawanda Lumberjacks†	0	Buffalo All-Americans (6–0–0)	35	Canisius Field
Canton Bulldogs (4–1–1)	18	Cleveland Tigers (1–3–1)	0	Dunn Field
Racine Cardinals (3–1–1)	6	Chicago Tigers (1–3–1)	3	Cubs Park
Columbus Panhandles (1–5–0)	10	Zanesville Mark Grays†	0	Zanesville, Ohio
Decatur Staleys (5–0–1)	0	Rock Island Independents (5–1–1)	0	Douglas Park
Hammond Pros (2–2–0)	14	Pullman Thorns†	13	Chicago, Illinois
Utica Knights of Columbus†	7	Rochester Jeffersons (4–1–1)	27	Rochester Baseball Park
November 11, 1920
Decatur Staleys (6–0–1)	20	Champaign Legion†	0	Champaign, Illinois
Rock Island Independents (5–1–2)	7	Thorn Tornadoes†	7	Monmouth, Illinois
November 14, 1920
Akron Pros (5–0–1)	7	Cleveland Tigers (1–3–2)	7	Dunn Field
Columbus Panhandles (1–6–0)	7	Buffalo All-Americans (7–0–0)	43	Canisius Field
Chicago Tigers (1–4–1)	0	Canton Bulldogs (5–1–1)	21	Lakeside Park
Cincinnati Celts†	0	Racine Cardinals (4–1–1)	21	Chicago, Illinois
Dayton Triangles (4–0–2)	21	Rock Island Independents (5–2–2)	0	Douglas Park
Decatur Staleys (7–0–1)	3	Minneapolis Marines†	0	Nicollet Park
Detroit Heralds (2–2–1)	0	Fort Wayne Friars†	0	Fort Wayne League Park
Hammond Pros (2–3–0)	6	Gary Elks†	7	Gleason Field
All-Tonawanda Lumberjacks†	6	Rochester Jeffersons (4–2–1)	0	Rochester Baseball Park
November 21, 1920
Dayton Triangles (4–1–2)	0	Akron Pros (6–0–1)	13	Akron League Park
Canton Bulldogs (6–1–1)	3	Buffalo All-Americans (7–1–0)	0	Canisius Field
Lansing Oldsmobile†	0	Racine Cardinals (5–1–1)	14	Chicago, Illinois
Toledo Maroons†	0	Cleveland Tigers (2–3–2)	14	Dunn Field
Columbus Panhandles (1–6–1)	0	Zanesville Mark Grays†	0	Zanesville, Ohio
Hammond Pros (2–4–0)	7	Decatur Staleys (8–0–1)	28	Staley Field
Rochester Scalpers†	0	Rochester Jeffersons (5–2–1)	16	Rochester Baseball Park
November 25, 1920
Canton Bulldogs (6–2–1)	0	Akron Pros (7–0–1)	7	Akron League Park
Decatur Staleys (9–0–1)	6	Chicago Tigers (1–5–1)	0	Chicago Cub Park
Columbus Panhandles (1–6–2)	0	Elyria Athletics†	0	Lorain, Ohio
Detroit Heralds (2–3–1)	0	Dayton Triangles (5–1–2)	28	Triangle Park
Hammond Pros (2–5–0)	0	Chicago Boosters†	27	DePaul Field
All-Tonawanda Lumberjacks† (2–1–0)	14	Rochester Jeffersons (5–3–1)	3	Rochester Baseball Park
November 28, 1920
Akron Pros (8–0–1)	14	Dayton Triangles (5–2–2)	0	Triangle Park
Cleveland Tigers (2–4–2)	0	Buffalo All-Americans (8–1–0)	7	Buffalo Baseball Park
Decatur Staleys (9–1–1)	6	Racine Cardinals (6–1–1)	7	Normal Park
Thorn Tornadoes†	0	Chicago Tigers (2–5–1)	27	Cubs Park
Lansing Oldsmobile†	0	Detroit Heralds (2–3–2)	0	Mack Park
Rochester Scalpers†	6	Rochester Jeffersons (6–3–1)	7	Rochester Baseball Park
Pittsburgh All-Collegians†	7	Rock Island Independents (6–2–2)	48	Douglas Park
December 4, 1920
Canton Bulldogs (6–3–1)	3	Buffalo All-Americans (9–1–0)	7	New York Polo Grounds
December 5, 1920
Akron Pros (8–0–2)	0	Buffalo All-Americans (9–1–1)	0	Buffalo Baseball Park
Canton Bulldogs (6–3–2)	0	Washington Glee Club†	0	New Haven, Connecticut
Racine Cardinals (6–2–1)	0	Decatur Staleys (10–1–1)	10	Cubs Park
Columbus Wagner Pirates†	0	Columbus Panhandles (2–6–2)	24	Neil Park
Detroit Maroons†	7	Detroit Heralds (2–3–3)	7	Mack Park
Rochester Scalpers†	0	Rochester Jeffersons (6–3–2)	0	Exposition Park
December 11, 1920
Canton Bulldogs (6–4–2)	7	Union Club of Phoenixville†	13	Phillies Park
December 12, 1920
Akron Pros (8–0–3)	0	Decatur Staleys (10–1–2)	0	Cubs Park
December 18, 1920
Canton Bulldogs (7–4–2)	39	Richmond Athletics†	0	Boulevard Field
December 19, 1920
Racine Cardinals (6–2–2)	14	Chicago Stayms†	14	Pyott Field

== Final standings ==
1920 APFA standings
	W	L	T	PCT	DIV	DPCT	PF	PA	STK
Akron Pros†	8	0	3	1.000	6–0–3	1.000	151	7	T2
Decatur Staleys	10	1	2	.909	5–1–2	.833	164	21	T1
Buffalo All-Americans	9	1	1	.900	4–1–1	.800	258	32	T1
Chicago Cardinals	6	2	2	.750	3–2–1	.600	101	29	T1
Rock Island Independents	6	2	2	.750	4–2–1	.667	201	49	W1
Dayton Triangles	5	2	2	.714	4–2–2	.667	150	54	L1
Rochester Jeffersons	6	3	2	.667	0–1–0	.000	156	57	T1
Canton Bulldogs	7	4	2	.636	4–3–1	.571	208	57	W1
Detroit Heralds	2	3	3	.400	1–3–0	.250	53	82	T2
Cleveland Tigers	2	4	2	.333	1–4–2	.200	28	46	L1
Chicago Tigers	2	5	1	.286	1–5–1	.167	49	63	W1
Hammond Pros	2	5	0	.286	0–3–0	.000	41	154	L3
Columbus Panhandles	2	6	2	.250	0–5–0	.000	41	121	W1
Muncie Flyers	0	1	0	.000	0–1–0	.000	0	45	L1

† Awarded the Brunswick-Balke Collender Cup and named APFA Champions
by vote of league owners. Staleys claimed a co-title.

== Postseason and legacy ==
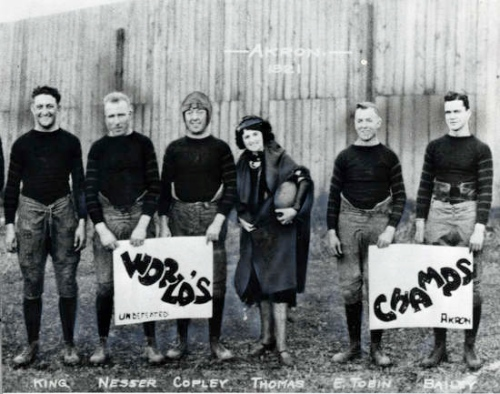
Several Akron Pros players celebrating their championship.

The Akron Pros ended the season as the only undefeated team in the Association. Despite this, two one-loss teams, the Decatur Staleys and Buffalo All-Americans, who both tied Akron that year, made cases for a co-championship.

As there was no playoff system in the APFA until 1932, a meeting was held to determine the 1920 Champions. Each team that showed up had a vote to determine the champions. Since the Akron Pros never lost a game, the Pros were awarded the Brunswick-Balke Collender Cup on April 30, 1921. The trophy was a "silver loving cup", donated by the Brunswick-Balke-Collender Company.

This decision, however, would arise with controversy. The Staleys and the All-Americans each stated that they should win the award because they had more wins and were not beaten by the Akron Pros. Each player from the Pros was also awarded with a golden fob; this was in the shape of a football and inscribed with "1920", "WORLD CHAMPIONS", and each player's first initial and last name.

The Pros did not officially celebrate their championship season until the following year. In October 1921, most of the team was invited to the Elks Club of Akron, which was labeled as "a grand homecoming celebration for the world's champions". Fritz Pollard was congratulated during an Akron Merchants Association of Colored Business Men's meeting.

The Pros were the first team in the history of the APFA to complete a non-modern "perfect season". Only four other teams have since accomplished this feat: the 1922 Canton Bulldogs at 10–0–2, the 1923 Canton Bulldogs at 11–0–1, the 1929 Green Bay Packers at 12–0–1, and the 1972 Miami Dolphins at 17–0–0. In 1972, the NFL changed the rules, so ties count as a half-win and a half-loss.

Even though the Pros were given the trophy in 1920, the league lost track of the event, and for a long time published in its own record books that the 1920 championship was undecided. It was not until the 1970s that the NFL discovered this early vote on awarding the Akron Pros the championship.

Of the 14 teams that played in the APFA/NFL's inaugural season, the Chicago Cardinals, now the Arizona Cardinals, and the Decatur Staleys, now the Chicago Bears, are the only teams that remain in the league.

== Awards ==
=== All-Pro ===
Bruce Copeland, sportswriter for the Rock Island Argus, compiled an All-Pro list for 1920. He used the games played in Rock Island, other newspapers, and his own memory to determine the first-, second-, and third-team All-Pro list. Pro-Football-Reference.com uses this list as the official All-Pro list of 1920. Twenty of the players were from Illinois and thirteen were from Ohio. The Rock Island Independents had the most players on the list (9), and Racine Cardinals had the least (1).

First-Team All-Pro

Player	Position	Team
Guy Chamberlin	End	Decatur Staleys
Oak Smith	End	Rock Island Independents
Wilbur Henry	Tackle	Canton Bulldogs
Hugh Blacklock	Tackle	Decatur Staleys
Fred Denfeld	Guard	Rock Island Independents
Dewey Lyle	Guard	Rock Island Independents
George Trafton	Center	Decatur Staleys
Paddy Driscoll	Quarterback	Racine Cardinals
Eddie Novak	Halfback	Rock Island Independents
Fritz Pollard	Halfback	Akron Pros
Rip King	Fullback	Akron Pros

Second-Team All-Pro

Player	Position	Team
George Halas	End	Decatur Staleys
Obe Wenig	End	Rock Island Independents
Cub Buck	Tackle	Canton Bulldogs
Ed Shaw	Tackle	Rock Island Independents
Alf Cobb	Guard	Akron Pros
Harrie Dadmun	Guard	Canton Bulldogs
Paul Des Jardien	Center	Chicago Tigers
Al Mahrt	Quarterback	Dayton Triangles
Norb Sacksteder	Halfback	Dayton Triangles
Joe Guyon	Halfback	Canton Bulldogs
Gil Falcon	Fullback	Chicago Tigers

Third-Team All-Pro

Player	Position	Team
Bobby Marshall	End	Rock Island Independents
Bob Nash	End	Akron Pros
Burt Ingwersen	Tackle	Decatur Staleys
Walt Buland	Tackle	Rock Island Independents
Tommy Tomlin	Guard	Akron Pros
Ross Petty	Guard	Decatur Staleys
Freeman Fitzgerald	Center	Rock Island Independents
Milt Ghee	Quarterback	Chicago Tigers
Dutch Sternaman	Halfback	Decatur Staleys
Frank Bacon	Halfback	Dayton Triangles
Pete Calac	Fullback	Canton Bulldogs

=== Hall of Fame ===
As of 2012, 10 players have been enshrined in the Pro Football Hall of Fame who played in the 1920 APFA season. One non-player, Joseph Carr, the owner of the Columbus Panhandles in the 1920 season and league president from 1921 to 1939, was also elected to the Hall.

Name	Team(s)	Year	Ref.
Carr, Joseph	Columbus Panhandles	1963	
Chamberlin, Guy	Decatur Staleys	1964	
Conzelman, Jimmy	Decatur Staleys	1964	
Driscoll, Paddy	Racine Cardinals; Decatur Staleys	1965	
Guyon, Joe	Canton Bulldogs	1966	
Halas, George	Decatur Staleys	1963	
Healey, Ed	Rock Island Independents	1964	
Henry, Pete	Canton Bulldogs	1963	
Pollard, Fritz	Akron Pros	2005	
Thorpe, Jim	Canton Bulldogs	1963	
Trafton, George	Decatur Staleys	1964	
