= 1920 All-Pro Team =

Official list of the best NFL players in 1920

First publication of Bruce Copeland's 1920 "All-Star Professional Teams" list.

The 1920 All-Pro Team — originally cast as the All-Star Professional Teams — was a select list of top performers of the 1920 season of the American Professional Football Association (APFA), forerunner of the National Football League. The list was the sole creation of Bruce Copeland, sports editor of the Rock Island Argus, one of the most pro football-centric newspapers of the day. It was published on December 2, 1920.

== Background ==
The 1920 team was a list compiled by Bruce Copeland, sports editor of the Rock Island Argus, who considered only members of the association's "Big Eight" teams for inclusion. These were, in his view, the Akron Pros, Canton Bulldogs, Chicago Cardinals and Tigers, Cleveland Tigers, Dayton Triangles, Decatur Staleys, and Rock Island Independents. He justified these eight teams as constituting an elite of the league based upon "comparative scores."

In addition to his "three first teams" of eleven players each, Copeland named three reserve elevens, with an addition 44 players accorded "honorable mention" status. In all, 111 players were named to Copeland's end-of-season roll call of star performers for 1920.

Copeland's three "All-Star Professional Teams" were published in the Argus on December 2, 1920.

== Biases ==
While five of the six teams excluded were of lesser caliber than their league peers, Copeland did omit one important squad from consideration — the Buffalo All-Americans, who finished fifth in the league standings. The All-Americans never played a game during the 1920 season outside of New York state and the team's personnel and their relative capabilities may have been unknown to Copeland.

It has been noted that since this was the list of a single sportswriter, there appears to be a discernible bias towards the "home team," the Rock Island Independents, in Copeland's choices. Copeland himself stated that his selections were based upon personal observations and "past acquaintance with most of the players with the Akron Indians, Canton Bulldogs, and Cleveland Tigers, which did not play this year in Rock Island."

Copeland's original article presents rationales for the players selected for first team honors. In these explanations, Copeland intimates that superior defensive performance was the chief consideration for linemen, rather than the offensive blocking ability of interior linemen or the pass-catching prowess of ends. Rock Island end Oak Smith is lauded, for example, as one who could "not be boxed" and who "broke through opposing lines almost at will, spilling the runner, interference, or blocking punts." On the other hand, the two top receiving ends in the league in Copeland's estimation, Dave Reese and Dutch Thiele of Dayton, are dismissed as "woefully weak" on defense, "as was demonstrated by repeated gains in their direction" during their 1920 appearance in Rock Island.

== Teams ==
Guy Chamberlin of the Decatur Staleys was deemed the top end in the APFA by Copeland. Chamberlin, a future member of the Pro Football Hall of Fame, won championships in 6 of his 9 professional years.

First team
Position	Player	Team
End	Guy Chamberlin	Decatur Staleys
End	Oak Smith	Rock Island Independents
Tackle	Wilbur Henry	Canton Bulldogs
Tackle	Hugh Blacklock	Decatur Staleys
Guard	Fred Denfeld	Rock Island Independents
Guard	Dewey Lyle	Rock Island Independents
Center	George Trafton	Decatur Staleys
Quarterback	Paddy Driscoll	Chicago Cardinals
Halfback	Eddie Novak	Rock Island Independents
Halfback	Fritz Pollard	Akron Pros
Fullback	Rip King	Akron Pros

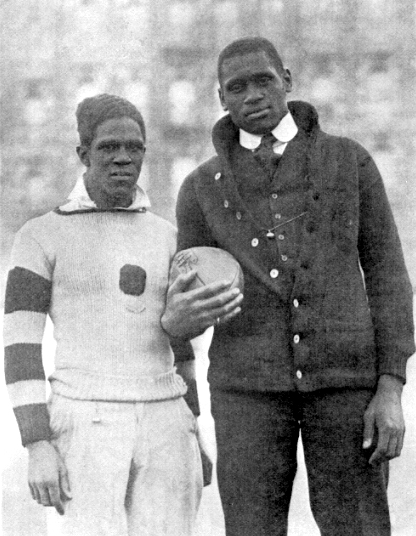
Diminutive halfback Fritz Pollard (L), "the colored Akron flash", was "supreme in the open field with the possible exception of [Paddy] Driscoll," Copeland wrote.

Second team
Position	Player	Team
End	George Halas	Decatur Staleys
End	Obe Wenig	Rock Island Independents
Tackle	Cub Buck	Canton Bulldogs
Tackle	Ed Shaw	Rock Island Independents
Guard	Alf Cobb	Akron Pros
Guard	Harrie Dadmun	Canton Bulldogs
Center	Paul Des Jardien	Chicago Tigers
Quarterback	Al Mahrt	Dayton Triangles
Halfback	Norb Sacksteder	Dayton Triangles
Halfback	Joe Guyon	Canton Bulldogs
Fullback	Guil Falcon	Chicago Tigers

Third team
Position	Player	Team
End	Bobby Marshall	Rock Island Independents
End	Bob Nash	Akron Pros
Tackle	Burt Ingwersen	Decatur Staleys
Tackle	Walt Buland	Rock Island Independents
Guard	Tommy Tomlin	Akron Pros
Guard	Ross Petty	Decatur Staleys
Center	Freeman Fitzgerald	Rock Island Independents
Quarterback	Milt Ghee	Chicago Tigers
Halfback	Dutch Sternaman	Decatur Staleys
Halfback	Frank Bacon	Dayton Triangles
Fullback	Pete Calac	Canton Bulldogs
