= Ross Petty (disambiguation) =

Ross Petty is a Canadian actor and theatre producer.

Ross Petty may also refer to:

- Ross Petty (American football), American football guard who played for the Decatur Staleys of the National Football League
- Ross Petty (pediatrician), Canadian pediatric rheumatologist
