= 1919 Detroit Heralds season =

American football team season

- Head coach: Bill Marshall
- Home stadium: Navin Field

Results
- Record: 1–4–2

The 1919 Detroit Heralds season was the 15th season for the Detroit Heralds, an independent American football team. Led by coach Bill Marshall, the team compiled a 1–4–2 record.

The team conducted its first practice of the year, and held tryouts, at Northwestern Field on September 20, 1919. Early signings included Snooks Dowd (Lehigh), Norb Sacksteder (Dayton), and Russ Finsterwald (Syracuse). The team signed several new players in the week after the first practice, including Whipple, who played end for Notre Dame; Devereaux, who played end for Christian Brothers and the Dayton Triangles; Gordon, a tackle who played for Virginia; and Carmen, who played fullback and guard at Vanderbilt. By late September, the Heralds had 42 candidates participating in their practice.

== Schedule ==
Date	Opponent	Site	Result	Attendance	Source
October 5	Hammond Pros	Detroit	Cancelled		
October 12	Cincinnati Celts	Navin Field; Detroit	W 23–20		
October 19	Massillon Tigers	Navin Field; Detroit	L 0–17		
October 26	Canton Bulldogs	Navin Field; Detroit	L 0–27		
November 2	Columbus Panhandles	Navin Field; Detroit	L 0–6		
November 10	Davenport A.C.	Detroit Athletic Club Park; Detroit	T 0–0		
November 16	vs. Hammond Pros	National League Park; Chicago	L 6–7	6,000	
November 23	at Cleveland Panthers	Cleveland	T 0–0		
November 30	Herald-Armadas	Mack Park; Detroit	Cancelled		
December 7	Dayton Triangles		Cancelled		

== Players ==
- Charlie Carman - guard
- Walker Carpenter - tackle, played college football for John Heisman at Georgia Tech
- Harry Costello - quarterback
- Devereaux - end
- Pat Dunne - fullback
- Russ Finsterwald - quarterback/halfback
- Moose Gardner - tackle/guard
- Charlie Guy - center
- Steamer Horning - tackle
- Jimmy Kelly - halfback
- Kreauz - fullback
- Blake Miller - end
- Norb Sacksteder - halfback
- Straight - guard
- Tandy - guard
- Tolman - fullback
- Ray Whipple - end
- Wyman - end
