= 1919 Canton Bulldogs season =

American football team season

- Owner: Ralph Hay
- Head coach: Jim Thorpe
- Home stadium: League Field

Results
- Record: 9–0–1
- League place: 1st

The 1919 Canton Bulldogs season was their tenth season in the Ohio League, and their last before entering the National Football League in 1920. The team finished 9–0–1.

== Schedule ==
The table below was compiled using the information from The Pro Football Archives, which uses various contemporary newspapers. For the results column, the winning team's score is posted first followed by the result for the Bulldogs. For the attendance, if a cell is greyed out and has "N/A", then that means there is an unknown figure for that game. The green-colored rows indicates a win.

Game	Date	Opponent	Result	Record	Venue	Attendance	Sources
1	October 5	Pitcairn Quakers	W 13–7	1–0	Lakeside Park	2,000	
2	October 12	Toledo Navy	W 64–0	2–0	Lakeside Park		
3	October 19	Columbus Panhandles	W 22–3	3–0	Lakeside Park	2,000	
4	October 26	at Detroit Heralds	W 27–0	4–0	Navin Field		
5	November 2	Akron Indians	W 19–7	5–0	Lakeside Park	9,000	
6	November 9	at Hammond All-Stars	T 3–3	5–0–1	Cubs Park	10,000	
7	November 16	Massillon Tigers	W 23–0	6–0–1	Lakeside Park	10,000	
8	November 23	at Akron Indians	W 14–0	7–0–1	Liberty Park	7,000	
9	November 27	at Hammond All-Stars	W 7–0	8–0–1	Cubs Park	12,000	
10	November 30	Massillon Tigers	W 3–0	9–0–1	Lakeside Park	7,000	
11	December 7	at Rock Island Independents	Cancelled				
