= 1919 Columbus Panhandles season =

American football team season

- General manager: Joseph F. Carr
- Head coach: Ted Nesser
- Home stadium: None

Results
- Record: 3-6-1

The 1919 Columbus Panhandles season was their 14th season in existence. It was also the last time that the team played in the Ohio League, before joining the early National Football League the following year. The team posted a 3-6-1 record.

== Regular season ==
=== Schedule ===
Game	Date	Opponent	Result
1	September 28, 1919	at Newark McDaniels	W 53-0
2	October 5, 1919	at Zanesville Mark Greys	T 0-0
3	October 12, 1919	at Akron Indians	L 13-0
4	October 19, 1919	at Canton Bulldogs	L 22-3
5	October 26, 1919	at Toledo Maroons	L 6-0
6	November 2, 1919	at Detroit Heralds	W 6-0
7	November 9, 1919	at Dayton Triangles	W 6-0
8	November 16, 1919	at Cleveland Tigers	L 20-9
9	November 23, 1919	at Rock Island Independents	L 40-0
10	November 30, 1919	at Dayton Triangles	L 21-0

== Game summaries ==
=== Game 3: at Akron Indians ===
October 12, 1919, at Liberty Park

Following the tie to the Mark Greys, the Panhandles played against the Indians at Liberty Park. The Panhandles played a strong defensive game, but the offense was weak. According to the Youngstown Vindicator, Brown for Akron was the "star of the game", "shaking defenders" for "fifty-yard gains." The quarters for 12.5 minutes long; and the Panhandles lost 13–0.
