= Chicago Tigers =

Defunct American football team

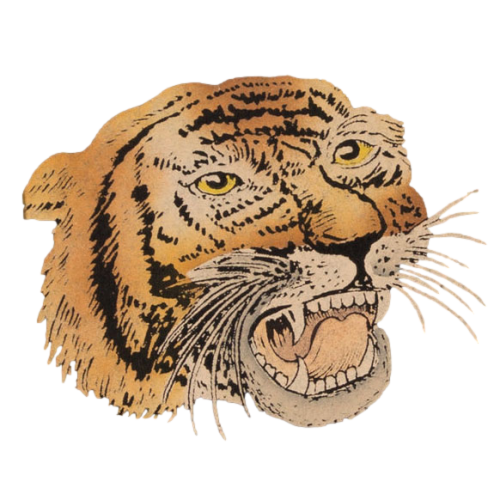
Logo

General information
- Founded: 1920
- Folded: 1920
- Stadium: Cubs Park
- Headquartered: Chicago, United States
- Colors: Orange, White

Personnel
- Owner: Guil Falcon (1920)
- Head coach: Guil Falcon (1920)

Team history
- Chicago Tigers (1920)

League / conference affiliations
- American Professional Football Association (1920)

The Chicago Tigers of the American Professional Football Association (APFA) played their first and only season in 1920, the first year of the league (1920), and have the distinction of being the first NFL team to fold. They had a record of 2 wins, 5 losses and 1 tie. The team played its home games at Chicago's Wrigley Field (then called Cubs Park) and was the first NFL team to do so. The Tigers were never formally members of the APFA. However, since the team played seven games against APFA teams in 1920, resulting in a 1–5–1 league record, they are generally included in the league standings.

== The franchise ==
Contemporary reports identified the Tigers as the successors to the Hammond Bobcats, a team that had named itself after the Chicago suburb of Hammond, Indiana but had played its games in Chicago and had spent a substantial amount of money in 1919 to field a successful team. The team dropped references to Hammond when Alva Young applied to bring an actual Hammond franchise, the Hammond Pros, into the new league. One of the Bobcats stars, George Halas, chose not to remain with the team and instead joined the Decatur Staleys as player and part-owner.

According to Emil Klosiinkski in the book, Pro Football in the Days of Rockne, the Tigers' main offensive weapon was their passing game. This specifically referred to the passes thrown by Johnny Barrett and Milt Ghee to Jack Meagher and Oscar Knop. On October 24, 1920, Halas brought the Staleys to Cubs Park for a game against the Tigers and billed it as "the season's most professional game" that would also determine the "pro title". Many Decatur games, at the time, were billed as championships in an attempt to lure crowds. The Staleys defeated the Tigers 10–0. The Staleys and Tigers would again play on Thanksgiving, with the Staleys again winning.

== Winner-take-all legend ==
In 1920 the Tigers and Racine Cardinals were playing for the same Chicago fan dollar. Legend has it that the Cardinals' owner Chris O’Brien offered to play for the right to represent the city of Chicago in the APFA, and that Tigers’ owner Guil Falcon had agreed to the terms. The game resulted in a 6–3 Cardinals win, with Paddy Driscoll scoring the game's only touchdown on a 40-yard run. The Tigers finished the season with a 2–5–1 record and, as allegedly promised, dropped out of the league.

However, there are three problems with this story: first, the Tigers played two more league games after losing to the Cardinals; second, O'Brien was willing to let the Decatur Staleys play in Chicago the following season (in fact, it was the Staleys that proved to be the Tigers' actual last league opponent); and third, there is no contemporary evidence for the challenge.

According to the NFL, the Chicago Tigers folded between the 1920 and 1921 seasons.

== Season-by-season ==
Year	W	L	T	Finish	Coach
1920	2	5	1	11th	Guil Falcon
