= Guido Wyland =

American football player and track athlete (1891–1974)

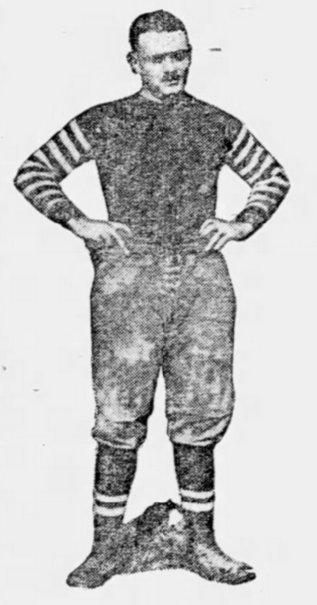

Profile
- Position: Guard

Personal information
- Born: June 5, 1891; Minden, Iowa, U.S.
- Died: December 8, 1974 (aged 83); Moline, Illinois, U.S.
- Listed height: 5 ft 10 in (1.78 m)
- Listed weight: 180 lb (82 kg)

Career information
- High school: Moline (IL)
- College: Iowa

Career history
- Rock Island Independents (1917–1920)

Guido Bruce Wyland (June 5, 1891 – December 8, 1974), referred to in contemporary sources by his given name but listed in modern statistical databases as "Pudge", was an American football player and track athlete. He played professional football, principally as a guard, for the Rock Island Independents from 1917 to 1920. His initial fame came from his accomplishments as a track and field athlete, competing in diverse events, including the 100-yard dash, high and low hurdles, shot put, hammer throw, and discus.

== Early life ==
Wyland was born in 1891 in Minden, Iowa. He was a track and field star at Moline High School. In May 1909, he attended a tri-state track meet as Moline's lone representative. Competing against 60 teams from across Iowa, Illinois, and Missouri, he scored 17 points, taking first place in the shot put and hammer throw, second place in the broad jump and 100-yard dash, and third place in the discus throw. Wyland's 17 points gave Moline a share of the team championship, tying with a 17-athlete team from Biggsville High School. In a dual meet against Davenport High School, he scored 41 points, including first-place finishes in the 50-yard dash, 100-yard dash, high and low hurdles, shot put, broad jump, and hammer throw.

Wyland also played center for the Moline High School football team, won all-state honors three times, and led the 1907 team to a state championship.

Wyland then enrolled at the University of Iowa, where he competed in both track and football. He played on Iowa's freshman football team in 1914 and the varsity team in 1915 and 1916. He was reportedly the first married player to write a letter in football in Iowa. He also participated in the Olympic trials in 1916, but the 1916 Summer Olympics were cancelled due to World War I.

== Rock Island Independents ==
In October 1917, Wyland joined the Rock Island Independents, one of the pioneering teams in professional football. He played for the Independents for four years from 1917 to 1920. Wyland's game totals are not readily available for the 1917 or 1918 seasons. He appeared in 11 games in 1919, playing for the Rock Island team that claimed the national professional football championship.

The Independents were among the original participants when the NFL was formed in 1920. On October 3, 1920, the Independents defeated the Muncie Flyers, 45–0, in what (depending on start time) may have been the first ever game between two NFL teams. Wyland started at the guard position in the game. Wyland played nine games during the 1920 Rock Island season.

== Family and later years ==
Wyland married Mary Carpentier in 1911.

After his career as a football player ended, Wyland coached football and track in St. Cloud, Minnesota, and Springfield, South Dakota. He later relocated to New Jersey for 18 years, working as a chemist for DuPont. He later returned to the Quad Cities and worked as a chemist at the Rock Island Arsenal.

He died in 1974 at age 83.
