= 1919 Akron Indians season =

American football team season

- Head coach: Ralph Waldsmith
- Home stadium: League Park

Results
- Record: 5–5
- Division place: No divisions
- Playoffs: No playoffs

The 1919 Akron Indians season was their twelfth season in existence. The team played in the Ohio League and posted a 5–5 record. The team later became a charter member of the National Football League the very next season.

== Schedule ==
Week	Date	Opponent	Result	Record
1	October 15	Toledo Athletic Club	W 47–0	1–0
2	October 12	Columbus Panhandles	W 13–0	2–0
3	October 19	Pitcairn Quakers	W 47–0	3–0
4	October 26	Massillon Tigers	L 6–9	3–1
5	November 2	at Canton Bulldogs	L 7–19	3–2
6	November 9	Massillon Tigers	L 6–13	3–3
7	November 16	Bellaire Athletics	W 19–3	4–3
8	November 23	Canton Bulldogs	L 0–14	4–4
9	November 27	at Pine Village Athletic Club	W 12–0	5–4
10	November 30	Rock Island Independents	L 0–17	5–5
