= Pudge Wyman =

American football player and coach (1895–1961)

Profile
- Positions: Fullback, halfback

Personal information
- Born: August 20, 1895; Minneapolis, Minnesota, U.S.
- Died: March 4, 1961 (aged 65); Minneapolis, Minnesota, U.S.

Career information
- College: University of Minnesota

Career history
- 1920: Rock Island Independents

Awards and highlights
- First-team All-Western (1916); First-team All-American, 1916

Arnold Douglas "Pudge" Wyman (August 20, 1895 – March 4, 1961) was an American football player. He was an All-American fullback for the University of Minnesota from 1915 to 1916 and halfback for the Rock Island Independents in the first season of the National Football League (NFL) in 1920. He is credited with several NFL firsts, including the first touchdown, first kickoff return for a touchdown and first passing touchdown.

== Biography ==
=== Early life ===
Wyman was born in Minneapolis, Minnesota in 1895 and graduated from Johnson High School in St. Paul, Minnesota.

=== University of Minnesota ===
Wyman enrolled at the University of Minnesota where he played in the backfield of the legendary Golden Gophers football teams of 1915 and 1916 coached by Dr. Henry L. Williams. Wyman was 5 feet 11 inches (1.80 m) tall, weighed 172 pounds (78 kg), and was one of the best passers in the game. From 1915 to 1916, Wyman and Minnesota end Bert Baston were "one of the greatest forward-passing combinations in the history of the gridiron." In Baston's biography at the College Football Hall of Fame, the 1915 and 1916 Minnesota teams were described as follows:

"Bert Baston was the receiver on a heralded Gopher passing partnership, hauling down the throws of Arnold 'Pudge' Wyman. The two paced Minnesota through the air, while Bernie Bierman carried the ground attack as Minnesota compiled a record of 12 victories, a loss and a tie through the 1915 and 1916 campaigns."

During the 1916 football season, Wyman was laid up for several days with "lumbago." Despite the illness, Wyman was selected in 1916 as a first-team All-American fullback by Walter Eckersall of the Chicago Tribune and a second-team All-American by the United Press and University of Michigan Coach Fielding H. Yost.

=== World War I ===
In the spring of 1917, with the United States' entry into World War I, Wyman was inducted into the U.S. Army at Fort Snelling, Minnesota. Wyman received his commission as a lieutenant and was sent overseas as an artillery officer in August 1917. He was assigned to the Fifth field artillery, where he remained throughout the war. He was promoted to the rank of captain shortly before the signing of the Armistice in November 1918. After being discharged, Wyman returned to Minneapolis in May 1919.

=== Football coach ===
In the fall of 1919, Wyman served as an assistant coach of the Minnesota Golden Gophers football team under head coach Henry L. Williams.

=== Professional football ===
In the 1920 NFL season, Wyman played professional football for the Rock Island Independents in the first year of the American Professional Football Association, which changed its name in 1922 to the National Football League. On October 3, 1920, the first Sunday in league history, Wyman scored three touchdowns (two on blocked punts and another on an 86-yard kickoff return) in a 45–0 victory over the Muncie Flyers. Wyman is credited with the first touchdowns on a blocked punt and the first kickoff return for a touchdown in league history. Because records are not available specifying the time of scoring in other games, the first touchdown ever in the NFL was scored either by Wyman or by Lou Partlow in a game for the Dayton Triangles. On October 10, 1920, the second week of the first NFL season, Wyman is credited with throwing the first touchdown pass in league history—a 35-yard completion to Waddy Kuehl against Hammond. Wyman also had five interceptions in 1920 for Rock Island. Wyman played in six games for Rock Island in 1920 before retiring from football.

=== Later life ===
Wyman died in 1961 at Minneapolis.

== See also ==
- 1916 College Football All-America Team
