= Waddy Kuehl =

American football player (1893–1967)

Profile
- Position: Back

Personal information
- Born: February 12, 1893; Davenport, Iowa, U.S.
- Died: July 24, 1967 (aged 74); Venice, Florida, U.S.
- Listed height: 5 ft 9 in (1.75 m)
- Listed weight: 165 lb (75 kg)

Career information
- College: St. Ambrose

Career history
- Rock Island Independents (1920); Buffalo All-Americans (1921); Detroit Tigers (1921); Buffalo All-Americans (1922); Rock Island Independents (1923); Dayton Triangles (1924)
- Stats at Pro Football Reference

Ray Otto "Waddy" Kuehl (February 12, 1893 – July 24, 1967), was an American football player who played five seasons in the National Football League (NFL) with the Rock Island Independents (1920, 1923), Detroit Tigers (1921), Buffalo All-Americans (1921-1922), and Dayton Triangles (1924). He appeared in 39 NFL games and scored nine touchdowns. On October 10, 1920, the second week of the first NFL season, Kuehl is credited with catching the first touchdown pass in NFL history — a 35-yard completion from Pudge Wyman against Hammond. He played college football at St. Ambrose University and Dubuque College (now known as Loras College), both located in Iowa. He retired from the game in 1925.
