= 1919 Massillon Tigers season =

American football team season

- Head coach: Bob Nash
- Home stadium: Hospital Grounds Stadium

Results
- Record: 6–3–1

The 1919 Massillon Tigers football season was their last season in existence. The Tigers 1918 season was cancelled due to the outbreak of World War I and the Spanish flu pandemic. The team would be represented by Ralph Hay at the formation of the National Football League in 1920, however the league was unable to find a buyer for the Tigers.

The Tigers posted a 6–3–1 record in 1919.

== Schedule ==
Game	Date	Opponent	Result	Record
1	October 5	Youngstown Patricians	W 27–0	1–0
2	October 12	Cleveland Tigers	W 3–0	2–0
3	October 19	at Detroit Heralds	W 17–0	3–0
4	October 26	at Akron Indians	W 9–6	4–0
5	November 9	Akron Indians	W 13–6	5–0
6	November 11	at Cleveland Tigers	L 0–3	5–1
7	November 16	at Canton Bulldogs	L 0–23	5–2
8	November 23	Dayton Triangles	T 0–0	5–2–1
9	November 27	at Cleveland Tigers	W 7–0	6–2–1
10	November 30	at Canton Bulldogs	L 0–3	6–3–1
