= Oscar Knop =

American football player (1896–1952)

No. 11
- Position: Running back

Personal information
- Born: September 5, 1896; Chicago, Illinois, U.S.
- Died: November 5, 1952 (aged 56); Chicago, Illinois, U.S.

Career information
- College: Illinois

Career history
- Chicago Tigers (1920); Hammond Pros (1921–1923); Chicago Bears (1923–1927)

Career NFL statistics
- Games played: 85
- Games started: 61
- Touchdowns: 7

Robert Oscar Knop (1896–1952) was an American professional football player who played running back for eight seasons for the Chicago Tigers, the Hammond Pros, and the Chicago Bears.

During a 1924 Bears game against the Columbus Tigers, Knop intercepted a pass and was turned around, inadvertently causing him to start running towards his own end zone before teammate Ed Healey dived and tackled him at the goal line. Fellow Bear Joey Sternaman recalled in 1991, "The entire Tiger team just stood there and watched as he started running the wrong way. Most of them were laughing, I think. I took off after him, yelling, but I guess he couldn't hear me." The following year, Knop joined the Bears and Red Grange on their barnstorming tour.
