= Tommy Tomlin =

American football player (1894–1949)

No. 14, 32
- Positions: Guard, tackle

Personal information
- Born: August 17, 1894; Waltham, Massachusetts, U.S.
- Died: March 23, 1949 (aged 54); Woodstock, New York, U.S.
- Listed height: 5 ft 10 in (1.78 m)
- Listed weight: 197 lb (89 kg)

Career information
- High school: Waltham (MA)
- College: Syracuse

Career history
- Akron Pros (1920–1921); Hammond Pros (1921); Milwaukee Badgers (1922); New York Giants (1925–1926)

Awards and highlights
- NFL champion (1920); Third-team All-Pro (1920)

Career NFL statistics
- Games played: 35
- Games started: 30
- Stats at Pro Football Reference

John Albert "Tommy" Tomlin (August 17, 1894 – March 23, 1949) was an American football player. He played professionally as guard and tackle for the Akron Pros, Hammond Pros, Milwaukee Badgers and New York Giants of the National Football League (NFL). He was born to Elizabeth Ford (1859–1927) and George Tomlin (1854–1928). Tomlin won an NFL title in 1920 with Akron.
