= Harry Webber (American football) =

American football player (1892–1970)

Profile
- Position: End

Personal information
- Born: October 18, 1892; Elk Point, South Dakota
- Died: October 6, 1970 (aged 77); Santa Clara County, California
- Listed weight: 173 lb (78 kg)

Career information
- College: Morningside

Career history
- Rock Island Independents (1920, 1923)

Career statistics
- Games: 4

Harry Sands "Obe" Webber (October 18, 1892 – October 6, 1970) was an American football player.

Webber was born in 1892 in Elk Point, South Dakota. He played college football for Morningside and professional football in the National Football League (NFL) as and end for the Rock Island Independents. He appeared in four NFL games, two as a starter, during the 1920 and 1923 seasons.

Webber died in 1970 in Santa Clara County, California.
