= Milt Ghee =

American football player (1891–1975)

Profile
- Position: Quarterback

Personal information
- Born: November 17, 1891; Wilmette, Illinois, U.S.
- Died: March 16, 1975 (aged 83); Vallejo, California, U.S.
- Listed height: 5 ft 7 in (1.70 m)
- Listed weight: 167 lb (76 kg)

Career information
- College: Dartmouth

Career history
- 1916–1917: Canton Bulldogs
- 1920: Chicago Tigers
- 1921: Cleveland Indians

Awards and highlights
- 2× Ohio League champion (1916, 1917); Third-team All-Pro (1920); First-team All-American (1914)

Milton Pomeroy Ghee Jr. (November 17, 1891 – March 16, 1975) was an American football quarterback. Born in Wilmette, Illinois, Ghee attended Oak Park High School before enrolling at Dartmouth College. He played college football for Dartmouth where he was selected as an All-American in 1914. Ghee played professional football in the early days of the professional game. From 1916 to 1917, he played for the Canton Bulldogs the included Jim Thorpe. The Bulldogs won the professional league championship in both years. According to one historical account of the 1916 Bulldogs, "the Dartmouth All-America was a fine passer who deserved his acclaim, but he needed some time to acclimate himself to his new teammates." In 1917, Ghee threw for 17 touchdown passes and was picked for the All-Pro Team by a Cleveland newspaper. He helped the Bulldogs win the 1917 championship, hitting Greasy Neale with a short touchdown pass for a 7-0 win over the Detroit Heralds in a Thanksgiving Day match with 8,000 fans in attendance.

A historical account published by Sports Illustrated in 1964 credits Ghee and Greasy Neale with pioneering the use of the huddle during the 1917 season. He traced the practice to a 1917 game between Canton and Youngstown. With Canton at Youngstown's 22-yard line on a third down with one to go, Ghee noted, "In the huddle, our quarterback, Milt Ghee, an All-America from Dartmouth, said, 'Greasy, what will we do?'" In 1917, quarterbacks called the plays while information, and the huddle was not generally adopted until a decade later. According to Neale, "We used the huddle in 1917 because that was the only way we could figure out what we were going to do since we never practiced before the game."

Ghee also played in the APFA for the Chicago Tigers in 1920 and the Cleveland Indians team (coached by Jim Thorpe in 1921. Ghee was 5-feet, 7-inches tall and weighed 167 pounds.
