= Fred Denfeld =

American football player (1898–1990)

Profile
- Position: Offensive lineman

Personal information
- Born: October 26, 1898; Duluth, Minnesota, U.S.
- Died: January 18, 1990 (aged 91); St. Paul, Minnesota, U.S.

Career information
- College: United States Naval Academy

Career history
- 1920: Rock Island Independents
- 1925: Duluth Kelleys

Awards and highlights
- First-team All-Pro (1920); Second-team All-American (1919)

Frederick Denfeld (October 26, 1898 – January 18, 1990) was an American professional football player who was an offensive lineman in the American Professional Football Association (APFA) and the National Football League (NFL). He played two seasons for the Rock Island Independents (1920) and the Duluth Kelleys (1925). He played college football at the United States Naval Academy.
