= Ross Petty (American football) =

American football player (1892–1966)

No. 17
- Position: Guard

Personal information
- Born: September 11, 1892; Sumner, Illinois, U.S.
- Died: March 13, 1966 (aged 73); Milwaukee, Wisconsin, U.S.
- Listed height: 6 ft 1 in (1.85 m)
- Listed weight: 180 lb (82 kg)

Career information
- High school: Lawrenceville
- College: Illinois

Career history
- Decatur Staleys (1920)

Awards and highlights
- Third-team All-Pro (1920)

Career statistics
- Games played: 10
- Games started: 5
- Stats at Pro Football Reference

Manley "Ross" Petty (September 11, 1892 – March 13, 1966) was an American professional football guard who played one season for the Decatur Staleys of the National Football League (NFL). He played college football at the University of Illinois for the Illinois Fighting Illini football team.
