= Bob Fosdick =

American football player (1894–1990)

Profile
- Positions: Guard, tackle

Personal information
- Born: November 11, 1894; Knoxville, Iowa
- Died: January 30, 1990 (aged 95); Tucson, Arizona
- Listed height: 5 ft 10 in (1.78 m)
- Listed weight: 225 lb (102 kg)

Career information
- High school: West (IA)
- College: Iowa

Career history
- Rock Island Independents (1920-1922); Minneapolis Marines (1920-1923)

Career statistics
- Games: 5
- Stats at Pro Football Reference

Robert Everett Fosdick (November 11, 1894 – January 30, 1990) was an American football player.

Fosdick was born in Knoxville, Iowa, in 1894. He attended high school in Des Moines, Iowa. He played college football at Iowa from 1914 to 1916.

He served in the Army during World War I and played professional football for the Rock Island Independents from 1918 to 1920. He also played as a guard and tackle for the Minneapolis Marines from 1920 to 1922. The Marines were part of the National Football League (NFL) in 1923, and Fosdick appeared in five NFL games, all as a starter, during the 1923 season.

After his football career ended, Fosdick owned a realty company in Minneapolis. He moved to Arizona in 1983 and died in 1990 in Tucson, Arizona, at age 95.
