= Guil Falcon =

American football player, coach, and owner (1892–1982)

Profile
- Positions: Fullback, Guard, Quarterback, Halfback

Personal information
- Born: December 15, 1892; Evanston, Illinois, U.S.
- Died: July 28, 1982 (aged 89); Hollywood, Florida, U.S.
- Listed height: 5 ft 10 in (1.78 m)
- Listed weight: 220 lb (100 kg)

Career information
- College: None

Career history

Playing
- 1915: Evanston North Ends
- 1917: Wabash A. A.
- 1919: Hammond All-Stars
- 1920: Chicago Tigers
- 1920–1921: Hammond Pros
- 1921: Canton Bulldogs
- 1922–1923: Toledo Maroons
- 1924: Hammond Pros
- 1925: Rochester Jeffersons
- 1925: Hammond Pros
- 1925: Akron Pros

Coaching
- 1920: Chicago Tigers
- 1922–1923: Toledo Maroons

owner
- 1920: Chicago Tigers

Awards and highlights
- Second-team All-Pro (1920)
- Coaching profile at Pro Football Reference

Guilford W. "Hawk" Falcon (December 15, 1892 – July 28, 1982) was an American professional football player, owner and coach who spent six season, from 1920 to 1925, in the National Football League (NFL) with the Akron Pros, Canton Bulldogs, Chicago Tigers, Hammond Pros, Rochester Jeffersons and the Toledo Maroons. Guil also served a player-coach during his time with the Tigers and Maroons.

In 1920 the Chicago Tigers and Cardinals playing for the same Chicago fan dollar. Cardinals owner Chris O’Brien offered—and Falcon agreed—to play for the right to represent Chicago in the American Professional Football Association, with the winner to remain as the city’s only professional team, while the loser would fold operations. Paddy Driscoll scored the game’s only touchdown on a 40-yard run and the Cardinals won, 6–3. As promised, the Tigers finished the season with a 2–5–1 record, dropped out of competition, becoming the first NFL/APFA team to fold.

Guil played with Pro Football Hall of Famer Fritz Pollard during his stints with Akron and Hammond.

In 2022, he was named one of the 10 inaugural members for the Football Learning Academy's Hall of Honor, which looks to acknowledge deserving icons that are not currently inducted in the hall.
