= Paddy Quinn (American football) =

American football player

No. 15
- Position: Back

Personal information
- Born: August 17, 1888 or May 15, 1890; Rock Island, Illinois, U.S. or Stuart, Iowa, U.S.
- Died: May 19, 1951; Glendale, California, U.S.
- Listed height: 5 ft 7 in (1.70 m)
- Listed weight: 170 lb (77 kg)

Career information
- High school: Rock Island (IL)
- College: None

Career history
- Rock Island Independents (1916–1921)

Career statistics
- Games played: 4
- Stats at Pro Football Reference

Patrick George Quinn (August 17, 1888 or May 15, 1890 – May 19, 1951) was an American football back who played two seasons in the American Professional Football Association (APFA) for the Rock Island Independents. He also played four seasons with the franchise when they were an independent team.

== Early life and education ==
Quinn was born on either August 17, 1888 or May 15, 1890, in either Rock Island, Illinois, or Stuart, Iowa. He attended Rock Island High School, and after graduating was "employed as [a] switchman for the Rock Island lines."

== Professional career ==
In 1916, Quinn started a professional football career with the independent Rock Island Independents. He played mainly backfield positions for the franchise, as they moved to the newly formed American Professional Football Association (APFA) in 1920. Standing at 5 feet, 7 inches, and weighing 170 pounds, Quinn appeared in three professional games in the inaugural APFA (now NFL) season. He wore number 15, and retired following one game played in the 1921 season. He played in a total of six professional seasons.

== Later life and death ==
In 1922, Quinn and his family moved to California, where he accepted a position with Warner Bros. film studios. He was employed at Warner Bros. until his death in 1951.

Quinn was married to Kate Mulcahy, whose brother was a mayor of Silvis, Illinois.
