= Wes Bradshaw =

American football player and coach (1897–1960)

Biographical details
- Born: November 26, 1897; Athens, Texas, U.S.
- Died: April 10, 1960 (aged 62); Athens, Texas, U.S.

Playing career

Football
- 1921–1922: Baylor
- 1924: Rock Island Independents
- 1926: Buffalo Rangers

Basketball
- 1921–1922: Baylor

Baseball
- 1922: Baylor
- Position: Halfback

Coaching career (HC unless noted)

Football
- ?–1947: Hardin–Simmons (assistant)
- 1948–1949: Ouachita Baptist

Basketball
- 1940–1942: Ouachita Baptist
- 1945–1947: Hardin–Simmons
- 1948–1950: Ouachita Baptist

Head coaching record
- Overall: 87–72 (basketball)

Wesley Walker Bradshaw (November 26, 1897 – April 10, 1960) was an American football player and coach. He was an All-Southwest Conference (SWC) back at Baylor University and was the first Southwest Conference football player to score 100 points in a single season with 119 points scored during the 1922 college football season.

He earned the nickname of "Rabbit" for his running style on the field. "On the football field, he was one of the hardest guys to get hold of I ever saw. He wasn't great as a fast runner, but he was very shifty and had a great change of pace. He was very hard to catch," said Southern Methodist University player James Stewart.

Bradshaw excelled in other sports at Baylor as well. He was a letterman in basketball, track, and baseball.

As a professional athlete, Bradshaw played for the Rock Island Independents (1924) in the position of half right. Jim Thorpe was among his teammates. He also played for the Buffalo Rangers (1926) in the National Football League (NFL).

After his professional career, Bradshaw became a high school football coach at Athens High School in Athens, Texas. He was appointed to the post June 4, 1925. He was also charged with coaching the basketball team. Bradshaw was the third coach at the school in as many years, and local boosters were reportedly concerned about his salary. Local businesses footed the bill.

In January 1927, Bradshaw was injured in a traffic accident. A motor bus, carrying Baylor students to a basketball game in Austin, collided with a fast International-Great Northern Railroad train, killing 10 students and injuring five. Bradshaw was accompanying the party as a guest of the Baylor coach.

Bradshaw later coached at Polytechnic High School in Fort Worth, Texas and at Ouachita Baptist University in Arkansas in the 1940s.

He was inducted into the Baylor Athletics Hall of Fame in 1961. He was inducted into the Texas Sports Hall of Fame in 1966.
