= Sid Nichols =

American football player and coach (1895–1971)

Biographical details
- Born: April 15, 1895; Creston, Iowa, U.S.
- Died: March 23, 1971 (aged 75); Paso Robles, California, U.S.

Playing career
- 1916–1917: Illinois
- 1920–1921: Rock Island Independents
- Positions: Blocking back, quarterback

Coaching career (HC unless noted)
- 1924–1925: Occidental

Head coaching record
- Overall: 10–7

Accomplishments and honors

Championships
- 1 SCC (1925)

Sidney Warren Nichols (April 15, 1895 – March 23, 1971) was an American football player and coach. He was a starting quarterback at the University of Illinois in 1917.

== Head coaching record ==
Year	Team	Overall	Conference	Standing	Bowl/playoffs
Occidental Tigers (Southern California Conference) (1924–1925)
1924	Occidental	4–4	4–1	2nd	
1925	Occidental	6–3	4–1	1st	
Occidental:		10–7	8–2		
Total:		10–7			
National championship Conference title Conference division title or championship game berth
