= Ross Petty (pediatrician) =

Canadian pediatrician

- Born: Canada
- Education: University of Saskatchewan
- Scientific career
- Fields: Pediatrics, Rheumatologist
- Workplaces: University of British Columbia

Ross E. Petty CM is a Canadian pediatric rheumatologist. He is a professor emeritus in the Department of Pediatrics at the University of British Columbia and a pediatric rheumatologist at BC Children’s Hospital in Vancouver, Canada. He established Canada’s first formal pediatric rheumatology program at the University of Manitoba in 1976, and three years later, he founded a similar program at the University of British Columbia.

In 2006, he was appointed a member of the Order of Canada for his contribution within Canada and around the world to improving the lives of children and youth with rheumatic diseases. In 2012, he was awarded a Queen Elizabeth II Diamond Jubilee medal.

== Early life and education ==
Petty was born in Bresaylor, Saskatchewan, and grew up in Paynton, Saskatchewan. He graduated from the College of Medicine of the University of Saskatchewan in 196. After finishing his medical internship in Saskatoon, Petty moved to Ann Arbor, Michigan, where he completed his rheumatology training under the mentorship of Drs. Jim Cassidy and Donita Sullivan at the University of Michigan. He went on to earn a PhD in immunology from the University of London. His thesis was titled The significance of antibody affinity in immune complex disease.

== Career ==
In 1976, Petty returned to Canada and established the first formal pediatric rheumatology program at the University of Manitoba. In 1979, he started a similar program at the University of British Columbia.

Petty has combined laboratory and clinical research during his career. He studied the significance of factor VIII related antigen in juvenile dermatomyositis. In addition, he studied the relationship between juvenile idiopathic arthritis and uveitis to antinuclear antibodies (ANA), discovering that ANAs were highly expressed during the onset of the disease.

With colleagues, he demonstrated the relationship of IgA deficiency in childhood rheumatic diseases, the influence of maternal anti-IgA antibodies on the occurrence of IgA deficiency in the offspring. He and colleagues first described the association of HLA-A2 with juvenile idiopathic arthritis. Along with Alan Rosenberg, he described the syndrome of seronegativity, enthesitis and arthritis (SEA syndrome), its relationship to HLA-B27, and the development of ankylosing spondylitis. These findings are now included in the juvenile idiopathic arthritis classification, proposed by the International League of Associations for Rheumatology.

Petty has contributed more than 225 original research papers and book chapters in medical and scientific journals. He has co-authored every edition of the Textbook of Pediatric Rheumatology, a pediatric rheumatology reference book. Petty chaired the International League of Associations for Rheumatology working group to define a new classification system and nomenclature for juvenile idiopathic arthritis and its subtypes.

== Awards and honors ==
Petty is a fellow in recognized institutions such as the American College of Rheumatology, the American Academy of Paediatrics and the Royal College of Physicians and Surgeons of Canada. He is the recipient of numerous awards including:

- Alan Ross Award of the Canadian Paediatric Society (1994)
- Distinguished Rheumatologist by the Canadian Rheumatology Association (1997)
- James T. Cassidy Award from the American Academy of Paediatrics (2003)
- Appointed a Member of the Order of Canada in recognition of his work in the field of pediatric rheumatology (2008)
- Masters Award from the American College of Rheumatology (2008)
- Recipient of the Queen Elizabeth II Diamond Jubilee medal (2012)
- Creation of Canada’s first Paediatric Arthritis Chair in Petty’s name (2017)
- Honorary Doctor of Science degree from the University of Saskatchewan (2018)

== Selected works ==
- Petty, Ross E.; Cassidy, James T.; Sullivan, Donita B. (1973). "Clinical correlates of antinuclear antibodies in juvenile rheumatoid arthritis". The Journal of Pediatrics. 83 (3): 386–389. doi:10.1016/s0022-3476(73)80260-4. ISSN 0022-3476. PMID 4579718.
- Rosenberg, Alan M.; Petty, Ross E. (1982). "A syndrome of seronegative enthesopathy and arthropathy in children". Arthritis & Rheumatism. 25 (9): 1041–1047. doi:10.1002/art.1780250902. ISSN 1529-0131. PMID 7126288.
- Petty, R. E.; Johnston, W.; McCormick, A. Q.; Hunt, D. W.; Rootman, J.; Rollins, D. F. (1989). "Uveitis and arthritis induced by adjuvant: clinical, immunologic and histologic characteristics". The Journal of Rheumatology. 16 (4): 499–505. ISSN 0315-162X. PMID 2664171.
- Malleson, P. N.; al-Matar, M.; Petty, R. E. (1992). "Idiopathic musculoskeletal pain syndromes in children". The Journal of Rheumatology. 19 (11): 1786–1789. ISSN 0315-162X. PMID 1491402.
- Roberton, D. M.; Cabral, D. A.; Malleson, P. N.; Petty, R. E. (1996). "Juvenile psoriatic arthritis: followup and evaluation of diagnostic criteria". The Journal of Rheumatology. 23 (1): 166–170. ISSN 0315-162X. PMID 8838527.
- Petty, R. E.; Southwood, T. R. (1998). "Classification of childhood arthritis: divide and conquer". The Journal of Rheumatology. 25 (10): 1869–1870. ISSN 0315-162X. PMID 9779836.
- Petty, Ross E.; Southwood, Taunton R.; Manners, Prudence; Baum, John; Glass, David N.; Goldenberg, Jose; He, Xiaohu; Maldonado-Cocco, Jose; Orozco-Alcala, Javier; Prieur, Anne-Marie; Suarez-Almazor, Maria E. (2004). "International League of Associations for Rheumatology classification of juvenile idiopathic arthritis: second revision, Edmonton, 2001". The Journal of Rheumatology. 31 (2): 390–392. ISSN 0315-162X. PMID 14760812.
- Petty, Ross E.; Laxer, Ronald M.; Lindsley, Carol B.; Wedderburn, Lucy (2016). Textbook of Pediatric Rheumatology (Seventh ed.). Philadelphia, PA: Elsevier. ISBN 978-0-323-35613-8. OCLC 910515121.
