= Polly Koch =

American football player (1895–1976)

Profile
- Position: Guard/Tackle

Personal information
- Born: August 1, 1895; Fond du Lac, Wisconsin
- Died: March 21, 1962 (aged 66); Hartford, Wisconsin

Career information
- College: Wisconsin

Career history
- Rock Island Independents (1920)

Career NFL statistics
- Games played: 4
- Stats at Pro Football Reference

Walter Henry "Polly" Koch (August 1, 1895 – June 22, 1976) was a player in the American Professional Football Association for the Rock Island Independents in 1920 as a guard and tackle. He played at the collegiate level at the University of Wisconsin–Madison.
