= 1919 Dayton Triangles season =

American football team season

- Head coach: Bud Talbott
- Home stadium: Triangle Park

Results
- Record: 5-2-1

The 1919 Dayton Triangles season was their seventh season, and last season, in the Ohio League. The team posted a 5–2–1 record and would become a charter member of the National Football League, the following season.

== Schedule ==
Game	Date	Opponent	Result
1	October 5, 1919	Indianapolis Marmon 34's	W 51–0
2	October 12, 1919	Pitcairn Quakers	W 28–0
3	October 19, 1919	Cleveland Panthers	L 19–14
4	November 2, 1919	Cincinnati Celts	W 26–0
5	November 10, 1919	Columbus Panhandles	L 6–0
6	November 17, 1919	Pine Village Athletic Club	W 19–6
7	November 23, 1919	at Massillon Tigers	T 0–0
8	November 29, 1919	Columbus Panhandles	W 21–0
