= Francis Bacon (American football) =

American football player (1894–1977)

- Bacon, c. 1920

No. 11, 8, 7
- Positions: Halfback, end

Personal information
- Born: January 11, 1894; South Bend, Indiana, U.S.
- Died: August 31, 1977 (aged 83); Sandusky, Ohio, U.S.
- Listed height: 6 ft 4 in (1.93 m)
- Listed weight: 210 lb (95 kg)

Career information
- High school: South Bend Central (IN)
- College: Wabash

Career history
- Dayton Triangles (1919–1925); Akron Pros (1923)

Awards and highlights
- Third-team All-Pro (1920)
- Stats at Pro Football Reference

Francis William Bacon (January 11, 1894 – August 31, 1977) was an American football, baseball, and basketball player. He played for the Dayton Triangles in the first official National Football League (NFL) game and was the first NFL player to return a punt for a touchdown. He played in the NFL from 1920 to 1925, appearing in 47 games and scoring 14 touchdowns.

== Early life and college ==
Bacon was born in South Bend, Indiana, in 1894. He attended South Bend High School and was described by the South Bend Tribune as "the greatest basketball player ever sent out by the local institution." He then enrolled at Wabash College where he played college basketball (as a guard), football (as a halfback and fullback), and baseball (as a first baseman) from 1914 to 1916 and was captain of the basketball team. He was also senior class president and rated as "one of the greatest athletes of the state."

== Military service ==
When the United States entered World War I, Bacon began studying wireless telegraphy and signalling in anticipation of joining the Aviation Corps. He was one of only two young men out of 500 who passed the eight-hour examination for the Aviation Corps. He enlisted in March 1918, and was ordered to report for active duty one week after graduating from Wabash. The war ended before Bacon deployed to Europe.

== Professional baseball and football ==
Prior to the creation of the National Football League (NFL), he played professional football for the Pine Village Athletic Club in 1917 and the Hammond Clabbys in 1918. He also played professional baseball in the Three-I and Central Leagues, probably in 1917, and with Little Rock in the Southern Association in 1919.

In 1919, he joined the Dayton Triangles professional football team. He also worked for the Dayton Engineering Laboratories Co. (Delco) as the head of educational development. When the NFL was formed in 1920, the Triangles were one of the original participants. On October 3, 1920, the Triangles defeated the Columbus Panhandles, 14–0, in the first official NFL game with Bacon as the starting right halfback. Fullback Lou Partlow gained fame for scoring the first NFL touchdown in the third quarter, and Bacon followed in the fourth quarter with the first NFL punt return for a touchdown.

Bacon continued with the club from 1920 to 1925. He also played for the Akron Pros in 1923. He appeared in 47 NFL games, playing at halfback, fullback and end, scored 14 touchdowns, and kicked two extra points.

== Later life ==
Bacon was married in December 1920 to Ruth Weaver of Ponca City, Oklahoma.

Bacon died in 1977 in Sandusky, Ohio.
