= Freeman Fitzgerald =

American football player (1891–1942)

Profile
- Position: Guard

Personal information
- Born: August 21, 1891; Gervais, Oregon, U.S.
- Died: May 6, 1942 (aged 50); Milwaukee, Wisconsin, U.S.
- Listed height: 6 ft 0 in (1.83 m)
- Listed weight: 195 lb (88 kg)

Career information
- High school: Springfield (MA)
- College: Notre Dame (1913–1915)

Career history
- Rock Island Independents (1920–1921)

Awards and highlights
- Third-team All-Pro (1920); All-American (1915); First-team All-Western (1915)

Career statistics
- Games played: 11
- Starts: 7

Freeman Charles Fitzgerald (born August 21, 1891) was an American professional football player. He was six feet in height and weighed 195 pounds. He played college football for the Notre Dame Fighting Irish from 1913 to 1915 and was selected as an All-American at the guard position in 1915. He later played professional football for the Massillon Tigers (1916), Youngstown Patricians (1917), as well as the Rock Island Independents of the American Professional Football Association, forerunner of the National Football League (1920–1921).

== Early life ==
Fitzgerald was born in Gervais, Oregon, and raised in Aberdeen, Washington. He attended the Columbia University school, a Roman Catholic school that was part of what later became the University of Portland in Portland, Oregon. He was a three-sport star at Columbia. As a pitcher for Columbia's baseball team, he once struck out 19 batters from Vancouver High School, setting a Portland Interscholastic League single-game record. In 1911, he signed a professional baseball contract with a team in Spokane, but he refused to report, opting to attend the University of Notre Dame instead. In football, Fitzgerald was the starting fullback for the 1911 Columbia football team that played in the Portland Interscholastic League. Four players from the 1911 Columbia team went on to become starters for the Notre Dame football team; they were Fitzgerald, Bill Kelleher, Bill Cook, and Charles Finnegan. Fitzgerald also played left forward for the 1910 Columbia basketball team that won the Portland Interscholastic League championship. In September 1912, Fitzgerald left Oregon for Notre Dame University, "where he is going in for athletics as much as study."

== Athlete at Notre Dame ==
After high school, Fitzgerald enrolled at Notre Dame where he studied mechanical engineering and continued to be a multi-sport star. Though his greatest fame came as a football player, he also won varsity letters in football, baseball, and basketball. Fitzgerald was among the first players in Notre Dame history to receive varsity letters in the three sports.

As a pitcher for the Notre Dame baseball team, Fitzgerald drew the attention of big league scouts. His pitching performance suffered in 1913, and his setback was blamed on the overdevelopment of his shoulder muscles after a summer of "pulling 'lead line' on a seining skiff at the Sand Island seining grounds. His pitching arm recovered in 1914, and he was offered "a fat contract" by the New York Yankees. However, Fitzgerald opted to continue with his education at Notre Dame.

For the summer of 1914, Fitzgerald did not return to the Pacific fishing grounds, instead accepting a job as a lifeguard at Cedar Point on Lake Erie: "What Sand Island at the mouth of Columbia River is to athletes of the Oregon, Cedar Point has long been to the athletes of Notre Dame. Every year between 15 and 20 go there, where working short hours they keep in good condition by swimming and boating, and are in splendid shape to hit into hard football practice in the early Fall."

In football, Fitzgerald played guard for Notre Dame from 1913 to 1915 and was a teammate of Knute Rockne on the 1913 football team. He was selected as the captain of Notre Dame's 1915 football team that compiled a 7–1 record – the sole loss a 20–19 defeat to Nebraska. He was selected as a first-team All-American in 1915 by Eastern sports authority Parke H. Davis and as a second-team All-American by International News Service sports editor Frank G. Menke.

Fitzgerald also excelled academically. He was also one of two Notre Dame athletes to receive the school's jewel in 1915 for highest scholastic standing. In the Notre Dame yearbook for the Class of 1916, the following tribute was paid to Fitzgerald:

"Fitzgerald is a big Oregonian — big in body, in mind, and in heart. During the last four years, he has been one of the most prominent and popular men at Notre Dame. As captain of the great 1915 football team, he won the recognition which his athletic ability deserved — a place on the all-American. His ability to shoot goals from the field and the foul line have made his presence on the basketball team invaluable. After four years of success in meeting the difficulties of the mathematics classes and the other troubles of the engineers, he has succumbed (according to rumor) to the charms of one of the fair ones in the neighboring city."

== Professional football and coaching ==
After graduating from Notre Dame, Fitzgerald played several seasons of professional football. He played for the Massillon Tigers in 1916, where he rejoined his Notre Dame teammate Knute Rockne. The 1916 Massillon Tigers finished in second place behind Jim Thorpe's Canton Bulldogs. In 1917, the Youngstown Patricians (a team affiliated with the Patrician Club at Youngstown's St. Patrick's Parish) sought to win the professional football championship and signed five All-Americans, including Fitzgerald, Tommy Hughitt, Tom Gormley, Bart Macomber, Bill Kelleher, and Gil Ward.

In 1918, Fitzgerald's professional football career was interrupted by military service after the United States entered World War I. He enlisted in the aviation corps and was commissioned as a second lieutenant and assigned as an aviation instructor at Brooks Field in San Antonio, Texas.

After the war, Fitzgerald signed with the Rock Island Independents of the American Professional Football Association (predecessor to the NFL). He played Rock Island in the 1920 and 1921 seasons.

From 1922 through 1927, Fitzgerald was the line coach at Marquette University in Milwaukee, Wisconsin. He was one of twelve teammates of Rockne from the 1914 football team who were selected for the honor guard at Rockne's funeral in 1931.

== See also ==
- 1915 College Football All-America Team
