= Fred Chicken =

American football player (1888–1968)

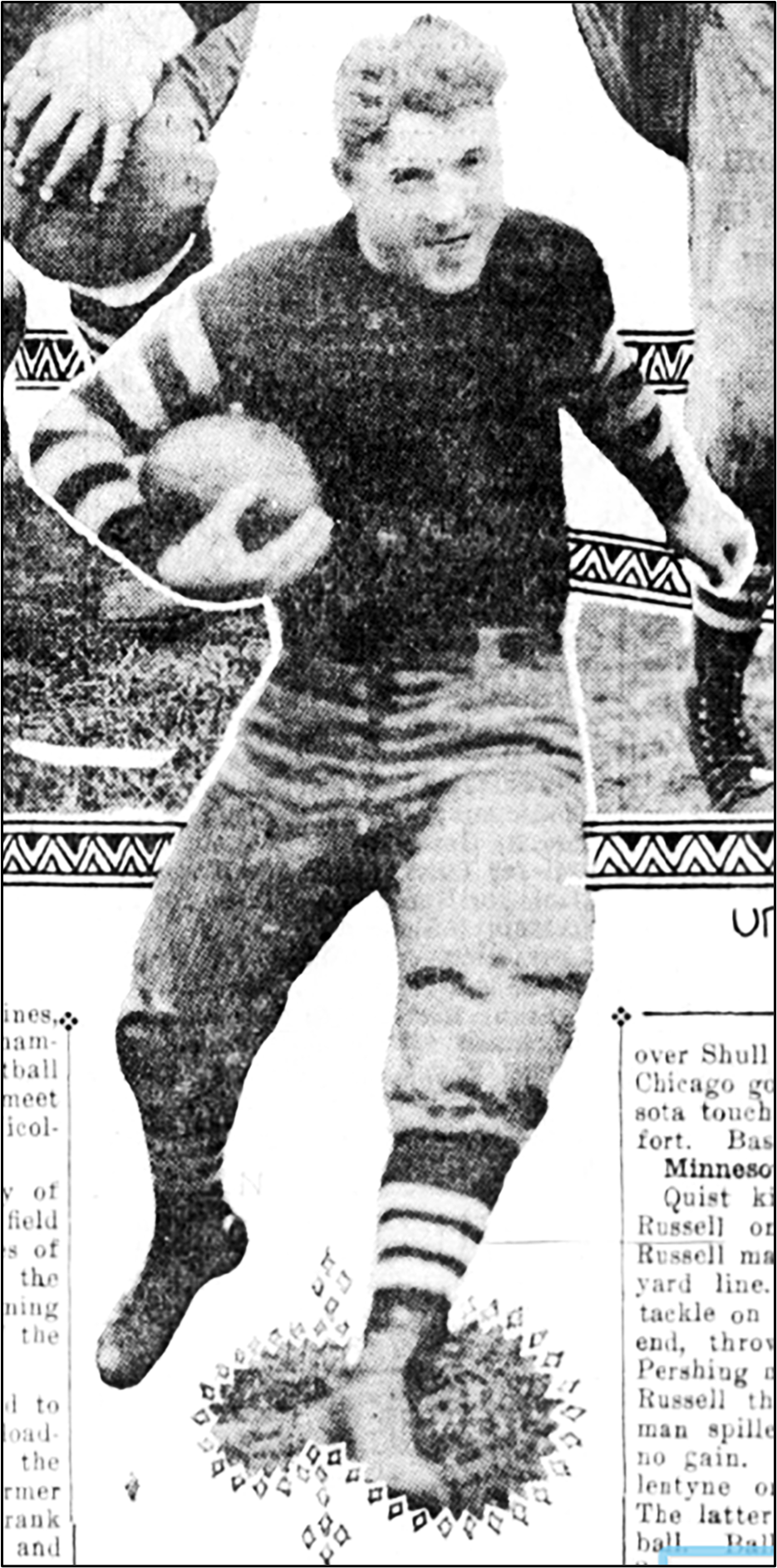
- Fred Chicken with the Minneapolis Marines in 1915

Profile
- Positions: Tailback, Halfback

Personal information
- Born: April 5, 1888; Minneapolis, Minnesota, U.S.
- Died: November 24, 1968 (aged 80); LaCrosse, Wisconsin, U.S.

Career information
- College: None

Career history
- 1913, 1915–1917: Minneapolis Marines
- 1916: West Duluth
- 1917, 1919–1920: Rock Island Independents
- 1918: U.S. Army Air Service Mechanics School
- 1921: Minnesota All-Stars
- 1922: Ironwood Legion

Fred Samuel "Chick" Slepica, a.k.a. "Fred Chicken" (1888–1968) was a professional baseball, basketball and American football player.

== Playing career ==
=== High School ===
A Minneapolis North athlete, Chicken played American football, basketball, and baseball for the high school. He was the star halfback of the 1907 undefeated and unscored upon Minneapolis North High School National Football Champions of the US. They had defeated the Oak Park, Illinois football team, another undefeated and unscored upon team, to claim that title.

=== Basketball ===
During and after high school, Chicken played for and managed the Ascension Parish basketball team, which found a sponsor in Dakota Business College in Fargo, North Dakota, and later in the Cooke Institute athletic club in Minneapolis. The Ascension team played games as far west as Billings, Montana, and perhaps Butte. He also appeared as a member of the Company B basketball team, which was sponsored by the Minnesota National Guard.

=== Baseball ===
Chicken played two seasons of professional baseball for the Lethbridge Miners in 1909 and 1910 and one season for the Calgary Bronchos in 1911 in the Western Canada League (WCL). Fred then played for the Seattle Giants and Tacoma Tigers in the Northwestern League in 1912. Chicken returned to the WCL and played for the Saskatoon Quakers in 1913 and Edmonton Eskimos in 1914. He then played for the Elgin Watch Makers in the Bi-State League in 1915. He last played in the WCL for the Great Falls Electrics in 1916 and 1917.

=== Football ===
Chicken first played professional football for Bobby Marshall’s Hennepins in 1911 and then played fullback and halfback for the Minneapolis Marines in 1913 and again from 1915 to 1917. He played as a ringer for West Duluth in 1916 and for the Rock Island Independents in 1917. During World War I in 1918, Chicken played for the U.S. Army Air Service Mechanics School service team. After the war, he played for the Rock Island Independents in 1919 and 1920. Chicken played for the Minnesota All-Stars in 1921 and for the Ironwood Legion in 1922.

== Personal life ==
While he was with the Marines, Chicken worked as a bookkeeper in the Hennepin County Auditor’s office. He went on to work as an accountant for Northern States Power Company. He later umpired baseball in La Cross, Wisconsin.

Fred Slepica used the last name Chicken throughout his lifetime. In the Czech language, “Slepica” means “hen.”
