= Toledo Maroons =

American football team from Toledo, Ohio

Logo

General information
- Founded: 1902
- Folded: 1923 (Unofficially transferred to Kenosha)
- Stadium: Armory Park (1902–1908, 1923); Swayne Field (1909–1922)
- Headquartered: Toledo, Ohio, United States
- Colors: Maroon, White

Personnel
- Head coach: Guil Falcon

Team history
- Toledo Athletic Association (1902–1906); Toledo Maroons (1906–23)

League / conference affiliations
- Ohio League (1902–1921); National Football League (1922–1923)

The Toledo Maroons were a professional American football team based in Toledo, Ohio in the National Football League in 1922 and 1923. Prior to joining the NFL, the Maroons played in the unofficial "Ohio League" from 1902 until 1921.

== History ==
=== Origins ===
The Maroons originated as a semi-pro football team known as the Toledo Athletic Association, in 1902. The Association formed the Toledo Maroons in 1906 as a farm team for teenagers who could later move up to playing for the Association's senior team. However, in 1908, the Association was forced to disband after the owners of Armory Park, where the team played, no longer wanted the field torn up by cleats. Despite the setback, the Maroons kept playing on other fields. By 1909, the former teenagers were adults, still playing organized football, and they began to play against numerous amateur and semi-pro opponents from outside the area.

Beginning in 1915, the Maroons were playing some very strong opposition, including such future NFL teams as the Columbus Panhandles, the Dayton Gym Cadets (later known as the Dayton Triangles), and the Cincinnati Celts.

=== NFL ===
When the American Professional Football Association was organized in 1920, Toledo chose to remain an independent team. However, in 1922, the Maroons joined the league, now renamed the National Football League.

The Maroons finished fourth with a 5–2–2 record that season, then dropped to 3–3–2 in 1923. Attendance was poor in Toledo, so the franchise moved to Kenosha, Wisconsin, and dropped out of the league after an 0–4–1 record in 1924. The Maroons ran up a 5–2–2 record in their initial 1922 season. However, the level of competition was suspect. Their opponents' combined mark was only 7–23–2. The Maroons scheduled easy opponents again in 1923 and finished this season at 3–3–2. However, when they were blasted 28–0 in the last game of the season by the Canton Bulldogs, the Toledo squad played its last game.

After the 1923 season ended, the league ordered the team to either transfer or suspend operations. The team's players and personnel did eventually move to Kenosha, Wisconsin to play as the Kenosha Maroons for the 1924 season. However no conclusive evidence exists that the Toledo franchise was officially transferred to Kenosha.

== Season-by-season ==
Year	W	L	T	Finish	Coach
1910	4	1	0	9th Ohio	Travis Sherman
1911	7	2	1	6th Ohio	Travis Sherman
1912	4	3	0	7th Ohio	Travis Sherman
1913	8	1	1	3rd Ohio	Travis Sherman
1914	7	2	0	4th Ohio	Travis Sherman
1915	7	2	2	5th Ohio	Rich Reno
1916	8	3	1	7th Ohio	Rich Reno
1917	3	7	0	7th Ohio	Rich Reno
1918	0	2	0	2nd Ohio	Alex Weir
1919	4	2	2	5th Ohio	Richie Bobbet
1920	1	3	0	?	Richie Bobbet
1922	5	2	2	4th	Guil Falcon
1923	3	3	2	11th	Guil Falcon
