= Eddie Novak =

American football player (1897–1984)

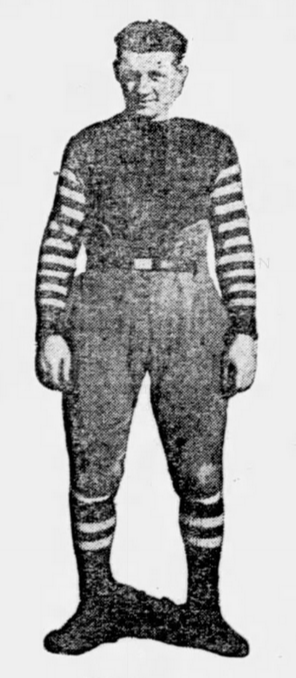

Profile
- Position: Wide receiver

Personal information
- Born: August 3, 1897
- Died: July 1984 (aged 87)

Career history
- 1920–1925: Rock Island Independents
- 1926: Minneapolis Marines

Awards and highlights
- First-team All-Pro (1920)

Eddie Novak (August 3, 1897 – July 1984) was an American professional football player who was a wide receiver for five seasons for the Rock Island Independents and Minneapolis Marines. He is credited for scoring the first touchdown in National Football League history.
