= Obe Wenig =

American football player (1895–1959)

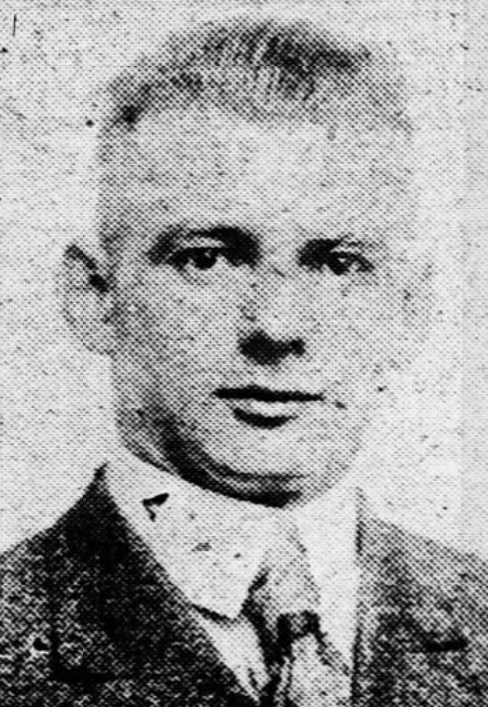
- Obe Wenig, c. 1924

Biographical details
- Born: December 23, 1895; Inwood, Iowa, U.S.
- Died: September 25, 1959 (aged 63); Springfield, Missouri, U.S.

Playing career

Football
- 1915–1916, 1919: Morningside
- 1920–1922: Rock Island Independents

Baseball
- 1915–1916, 1919?: Morningside
- 1917: Freeman
- 1920: Armour

Basketball
- 1915–1916, 1919–1920: Morningside

Track and field
- 1915–1916, 1919?: Morningside
- Positions: End (football); Pitcher (baseball); Forward (basketball)

Coaching career (HC unless noted)

Football
- 1922: Mapleton HS
- 1923–?: Morningside (assistant)

Basketball
- 1923–1932: Morningside

Track and field
- 1923–?: Morningside (freshmen)

Accomplishments and honors

Awards
- Walter Camp All-American (1919); Second-team All-Pro (1920); Morningside Athletic Hall of Fame (1956)

Ervine Carl "Obe" Wenig (December 23, 1895 – September 25, 1959) was an American football end who played three seasons in the National Football League (NFL) for the Rock Island Independents. From Inwood, Iowa, he attended Morningside College where he played in four sports: football, baseball, basketball, and track. He was an All-American football player at Morningside and later was named second-team All-Pro in his first year in the NFL. After his playing career, he was a coach and an agent for the Federal Bureau of Investigation (FBI).

== Early life and education ==
Wenig was born on December 23, 1895, in Inwood, Iowa. He attended high school in Inwood, before graduating in 1914. He enrolled at Morningside College (now Morningside University) in fall of that year. At Morningside, he played on the football, baseball, basketball, and track teams.

Wenig started playing varsity sports for Morningside in 1915. In 1916, during a 112–0 football win over Dakota Wesleyan, Wenig made a 50-yard drop kick, the "longest one ever made in a game in Sioux City." A report by The Wayne Herald following another 100-point win said the following:

Another star of the contest, although he did not have much opportunity to carry the ball, was "Obe" Wenig. His wonderful ability to breakup the secondary defense of the visitors [Nebraska State Normal] made possible many of the scores by his teammates. His tackling was the best seen on the local field this year. When given an opportunity to carry the ball he was a sensation. After every backfield man had made two or three touchdowns Behmer called Wenig back and gave him the ball. In his first chance he made thirty-five yards around left end and then made twenty more on the next play for a touchdown.

In the 1916 baseball season, Wenig, a left-handed pitcher, did not lose a game, and led his team to numerous shutouts. He was named team captain in track in May 1917, but enlisted in the Army for World War I before getting a chance to captain the team. He also briefly played "phenomenal ball" for several minor league baseball teams that year, including the Freeman team in Iowa.

With the United States Army in World War I, Wenig served overseas in the 88th division before returning to Morningside in 1919. He was named team captain in football upon returning, and led them to a 5–2 record. Following the season, he was named All-American by Walter Camp. In basketball, Wenig was named honorable mention all-state at the end of the 1919–1920 season.

== Professional career ==
In 1920, Wenig briefly played baseball for the "Armours", before suffering an injury that ended his baseball career. Prior to a game against the Decatur Staleys, the Rock Island Independents of the American Professional Football Association (APFA) signed Wenig to play end and tackle. Wenig played just one game during the season, as starting left end in the Staleys-Independents matchup, a 0–0 tie. Despite just appearing in one game during the season, he was named second-team All-Pro by sportswriter Bruce Copeland, who was noted for his bias in favor of the Rock Island team. The 1920 Independents compiled a record of 4–2–1, fourth place in the league.

Wenig returned to the Independents for the 1921 season, playing in seven games, starting six, and making three touchdowns and eight extra points. He helped them place fifth in the NFL with a record of 4–2–1. In 1922, Wenig accepted a position as football coach at Mapleton High School, and The Daily Times reported that he was "definitely out of the game for the year" due to his coaching contract. Despite this, he returned to Rock Island mid-season for their game against the Chicago Bears, stating that "thoughts of the game [the previous year against the Bears] stirred him so much he could not help but return." He played in the game against the Bears, a loss, and remained with the Independents for the rest of the season, as they placed fifth in league standings with a 4–2–1 record.

== Later life and death ==
In 1922, while playing for Rock Island, Wenig was named a coach at Mapleton High School. He also coached football, basketball, and track at his alma mater of Morningside College starting in 1923. He was the head basketball coach from 1923 to 1932 and compiled an overall record of 54–66, winning one conference championship. Wenig was inducted into the Morningside Athletic Hall of Fame in 1956. He was also a golfer, and the Sioux City champion for a time. After his sports career, he served as an agent for the Federal Bureau of Investigation (FBI) and later ran a private detective agency in Texas. Wenig was married to Lucile Waterhouse in June 1924. He died on September 25, 1959, at the age of 63, due to a heart attack.
