= Ed Shaw (American football) =

American football player (1895–1964)

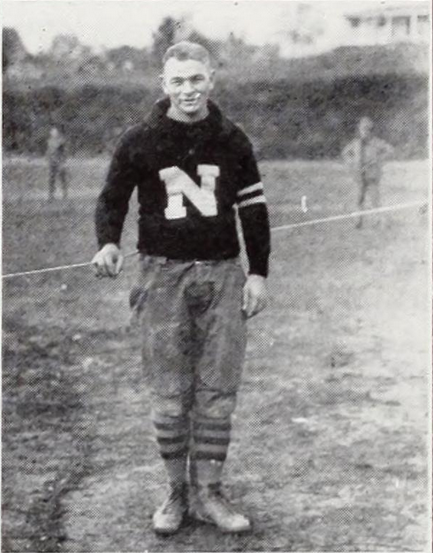

No. 16
- Positions: Fullback, halfback, tackle

Personal information
- Born: August 7, 1895; Tecumseh, Nebraska, U.S.
- Died: October 30, 1964 (aged 69); Omaha, Nebraska, U.S.
- Listed height: 6 ft 1 in (1.85 m)
- Listed weight: 203 lb (92 kg)

Career information
- High school: Tecumseh
- College: Nebraska

Career history

Playing
- Rock Island Independents (1920); Canton Bulldogs (1922); Akron Pros (1923)

Coaching
- Clemson (1921) Assistant coach

Awards and highlights
- NFL champion (1922); Second-team All-Pro (1920); 1x Rock Island Argus: 2nd team all-APFA (1920)
- Stats at Pro Football Reference

Edson Walter Shaw (August 7, 1895 – October 30, 1964) was an American professional football player who played in the National Football League (NFL) with the Rock Island Independents, Canton Bulldogs and the Akron Pros. Shaw won an NFL Championship in 1922 with the Bulldogs. He finish his career in 1923, playing for the Pros. Before playing professionally, Shaw played college football at the University of Nebraska. He lettered in football in 1915, 1916 and 1917. Shaw was an assistant coach at Clemson under his former Nebraska coach E. J. Stewart in 1921.
