= Jerry Mansfield =

American football player (1892–1960)

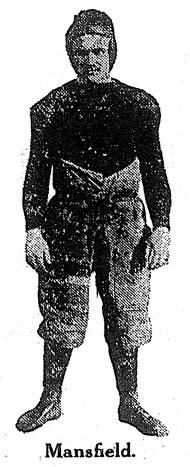

No. 10
- Positions: Fullback, end, linebacker

Personal information
- Born: August 13, 1892; Rock Island, Illinois, U.S.
- Died: October 27, 1960 (aged 68); Rock Island, Illinois, U.S.
- Listed height: 5 ft 8 in (1.73 m)
- Listed weight: 160 lb (73 kg)

Career information
- High school: Rock Island
- College: None

Career history
- Rock Island Independents (1919–1921)
- Stats at Pro Football Reference

Jermiah Allen Mansfield (August 13, 1892 – October 27, 1960) was an American professional football fullback who played two seasons with the Rock Island Independents of the American Professional Football Association (APFA).

== Early life ==
Jermiah Allen Mansfield was born on August 13, 1892, in Rock Island, Illinois. (Note: RockIslandIndependents.com says he was born in Davenport, Iowa in 1893.) He attended Rock Island High School in Rock Island. He did not play college football.

== Professional career ==
Mansfield played in 11 games, all starts, for the Rock Island Independents in 1919 as a fullback and end. He played in eight games, starting three, for the Independents in 1920, the first year of the American Professional Football Association. He was listed as a fullback, linebacker, end, and halfback that year and wore jersey number 10. Mansfield scored one receiving touchdown during the 1920 season. He appeared in one game during the 1921 season, being listed as a fullback /linebacker.

== Personal life ==
Mansfield served in the United States Army. He was a fan of the Notre Dame Fighting Irish football team. He died on October 27, 1960, in Rock Island at the age of 68.
