= Dewey Lyle =

American football player (1891–1980)

- Lyle with the Packers in 1923

Profile
- Position: Offensive lineman

Personal information
- Born: March 23, 1891; Minneapolis, Minnesota, U.S.
- Died: November 27, 1980 (aged 89); Paso Robles, California, U.S.

Career information
- College: Minnesota

Career history
- 1916–1919: Minneapolis Marines
- 1920–1922: Rock Island Independents
- 1922–1923: Green Bay Packers

Awards and highlights
- First-team All-Pro (1920)

Dewitt "Dewey" Wagner Lyle (March 23, 1891 - November 27, 1980) was a professional American football offensive lineman in the American Professional Football Association (APFA) and the National Football League (NFL). He played four seasons in APFA/NFL split between the Rock Island Independents and the Green Bay Packers. However Lyle also played for the Minneapolis Marines, from 1916 to 1919, prior to that team's entry into the NFL.
