= Oak Smith =

American football player (1894–1974)

No. 7
- Positions: End, fullback, halfback, wingback

Personal information
- Born: February 27, 1894; Downing, Missouri, U.S.
- Died: May 2, 1974 (aged 80); Long Beach, California, U.S.
- Listed height: 6 ft 2 in (1.88 m)
- Listed weight: 185 lb (84 kg)

Career information
- High school: Centerville (Centerville, Iowa)
- College: Drake

Career history

Playing
- Rock Island Independents (1920–1921)

Coaching
- Occidental (1924–1925) Assistant coach; Long Beach (1929–1933) Head coach

Awards and highlights
- First-team All-Pro (1920)

Career statistics
- Games played: 16
- Games started: 9

Okla Eugene Smith (February 27, 1894 – May 2, 1974), nicknamed "Oak" (sometimes spelled "Oke" ), was an American football player and coach. He played professionally as an end, fullback, and wingback for two seasons, from 1920 to 1921, with the Rock Island Independents of the American Professional Football Association (APFA), which was renamed as the National Football League (NFL) in 1922. He was a first-team selection on the 1920 All-Pro Team.

== Biography ==
Smith attended Drake University, where lettered football, basketball, and track. He football as a halfback and fullback, basketball as a center, and ran the half-mile in track. He was elected the captain of the 1916 Drake football team.

Smith earned a Bachelor of Arts from the University of Southern California (USC). He coached football and basketball at Occidental College in Los Angeles.

Smith served as the head football coach at Long Beach Junior College—now known as Long Beach City College (LBCC)—from 1929 to 1933.

Smith died on May 2, 1974.
