= Walt Buland =

American football player (1892–1937)

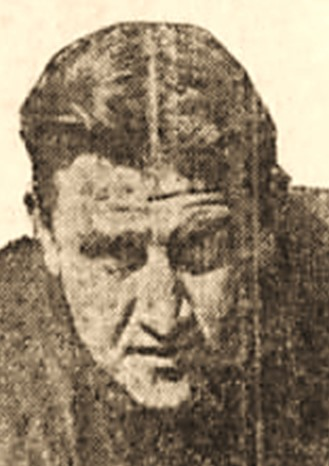

Profile
- Position: Tackle

Personal information
- Born: February 7, 1892; Minneapolis, Minnesota, U.S.
- Died: May 26, 1937 (aged 45); Rock Island, Illinois, U.S.
- Listed height: 6 ft 1 in (1.85 m)
- Listed weight: 213 lb (97 kg)

Career information
- College: None

Career history
- 1907–1909, 1911–1917: Minneapolis Marines
- 1916: West Duluth
- 1917, 1919–1921, 1924, 1927: Rock Island Independents
- 1922–1923, 1925: Hibbing All-Stars
- 1924: Green Bay Packers
- 1926: Duluth Eskimos

Career NFL statistics
- Games played: 19
- Starts: 12

Walter Daniel "Fat" Buland (February 7, 1892 – May 26, 1937) was a professional football player in the early National Football League (NFL). He played in the NFL for the Rock Island Independents, Green Bay Packers and Duluth Eskimos. He also played for the Minneapolis Marines prior to their entry into the NFL.

Buland in the green-and-white uniform of the Rock Island Independents, 1921.

Buland played in one of the two very first NFL games. On October 3, 1920, during a game between the Independents and the Muncie Flyers, Buland blocked a Ken Huffine punt in the Flyers endzone and recovered it for a touchdown.

Buland played as a ringer for West Duluth in 1916 and for Rock Island in 1917. He also played for and coached the Hibbing All-Stars in 1922, 1923, and 1925.

Buland served in the 122nd Machine Gun Battalion during World War I and fought in the trenches near Amiens, France, and in the battle of Saint-Mihiel. He is buried in the Rock Island National Cemetery.

After Buland's death, sportswriter George Barton of the Minneapolis Tribune remembered that men who had played against Buland, including many former University of Minnesota Gophers players, declared Buland "could have won a place at tackle at any university in the Western conference, or anywhere else for that matter, had he decided upon a college career."
