= 1920 Muncie Flyers season =

APFA football season

- Owner: Earl Ball, Cooney Checkaye
- Head coach: Ken Huffine
- Home stadium: traveling team

Results
- Record: 0–1 (APFA) (3–1 overall)
- League place: 14th in APFA

The 1920 Muncie Flyers season was the franchise's inaugural season in the American Professional Football League (APFA)—later named the National Football League. The Flyers entered the season coming off a 4–1–1 record in 1919. Several representatives from the Ohio League wanted to form a new professional league; thus, the APFA was created.

The 1920 team only played in one game that counted in the standings: a 45–0 loss against the Rock Island Independents. This game and the Columbus Panhandles–Dayton Triangles on the same date is considered to be the first league game featuring two APFA teams. The Flyers tried to schedule other games, but the opponents canceled to play better teams. As a result, the Flyers had to play the rest of the season's game versus local teams. At the end of the season, the Flyers won a game against the Muncie Offers More AC for the Muncie City Championship.

== Background ==
"A team representing the pick of the former collegiate stars who have entered the professional football field, will play out of Muncie next fall under the Flyers' club. All games will be played on the road and contests will be scheduled with the strongest pro elevens in the middle west."

So was the American Professional Football Association (APFA) announced to the people of Muncie, Indiana, population 36,524, in their evening newspaper on August 21, 1920. The theory of a professional football team playing nothing but away games, surviving on appearance guarantees and a percentage of the gate, was about to be tested. Football season was just around the corner.

Known as the Muncie–Congerville Flyers, the team finished 4–1–1 as an independent team in 1919. They concluded this season with a win over Avondale AA and won the Muncie City Championship.

Representatives of four Ohio League teams — the Canton Bulldogs, the Cleveland Tigers, the Dayton Triangles, and the Akron Pros — called a meeting on August 20, 1920, to discuss the formation of a new, professional league. At the meeting, they tentatively agreed on a salary cap and pledged not to sign college players or players already under contract with other teams. They agreed on a name for the circuit: the American Professional Football Conference, later modified to the American Professional Football Association.

Earl Ball, the Flyers' manager, heard about this gathering on August 29 and was interested in participating. And thus the Muncie Flyers found themselves a member from the inception of the association that would emerge as the National Football League in 1922.

== Regular season ==
The Flyers hosted a practice game against the Muncie Tigers on September 26, 1920, but the result of the game remains unknown.

The Flyers' first road game of the season was against the long-established Rock Island Independents, kicking around as a professional football club since 1907. The game was a slaughter, the road team humiliated as recipients of 45 to 0 beatdown.

As a result, the Decatur Staleys, who were supposed to play the Flyers the next week, cancelled because they wanted to play a better team. The Flyers tried to schedule game for the next few weeks but were unsuccessful. Since there were no rules to keep players on teams, several Flyers' players left and played for other teams.

After two dry weeks, in which the Muncie touring team could not land a game with an opponent, a game was scheduled with the Cleveland Tigers of the APFA. Muncie attempted to bolster its roster for the game by raiding the Friar Athletic Association of Fort Wayne, with a team representative making a monetary offer to two of the team's best players and asking them to bring along two other players on the Friars' roster. The effort was rebuffed.

With the Friar team already teetering at the edge of the abyss, one local journalist was incensed at the Flyers' temerity, charging it with violating the APFA's anti-tampering rule and calling the attempted raid "despicable in the extreme" and an act that "should be taken into account by all followers of the game and true lovers of fair play."

Karma was not long in arriving, as the Flyers' scheduled game in Cleveland was abruptly cancelled by the home team, who played at Dunn Field against the Columbus Panhandles instead.

Bad luck followed the next week for Muncie's scheduled game against the Dayton Triangles, when heavy rain forced a cancellation of the contest at 10:30 am the day of the game. Another two weeks would pass with the Flyers unable to find an opponent willing to book the team and pay a guarantee.

Late in November, the Flyers were challenged by the Gas City Tigers and Muncie Offers More AC — two other local Indiana football squads — in an effort to determine local gridiron superiority. While these games are not counted in the APFA standings, the Flyers topped both teams handily, providing a semi-sweet finish to an otherwise bitter year.

== Filling the seven week gap ==
The 1920 Flyers were unable to schedule opponents and play for virtually all of October and November — the two prime football months. Consequently, a number of the team's best players scrambled to find other remunerative opportunities for their Sunday afternoons.

For example, quarterback Cooney Checkaye, lineman Babe Hole, and lefthalf Mickey Hole signed on with the Wabash Athletic Association for an October 17 game against the Gas City Tigers, played in front of 1,800 fans at Gas City, Indiana, just south of Marion. According to one sportswriter who watched the game, the ringers from the Flyers "did not even know the signals until just before the game. Unsurprisingly, Wabash lost.

Similarly, on November 21, Checkaye, the Hole brothers, fullback Ken Huffine, and three other Flyers latched on with the Muncie Tigers for their game — a 24–0 beatdown at the hands of the Gary Elks.

== Schedule ==
The table below was compiled using information from The Pro Football Archives and The Coffin Corner, both of which used various contemporary newspapers. The games against the local teams are listed, but were not counted in the final APFA standings.

Game	Date	Opponent	Result	Record	Venue	Attendance	Recap	Sources
—	September 26	Muncie Tigers		—			—	
1	October 3	at Rock Island Independents	L 0–45	0–1	Douglas Park	3,110	Recap	
—	October 10	at Decatur Staleys	cancelled by Staleys due to Flyers' weakness					
—	October 17	(open date)						
—	October 24	(open date)						
—	October 31	at Cleveland Tigers	cancelled by Cleveland for a different opponent					
—	November 7	at Dayton Triangles	cancelled due to rain					
—	November 14	(open date)						
—	November 21	(open date)						
—	November 25	at Gas City Tigers	W 19–7	1–1	Gas City, Indiana		—	
—	November 28	at Muncie Offers More AC	W 24–0	2–1	Walnut Park		—	
—	December 5	at Gas City Tigers	W 13–7	3–1	Gas City, Indiana		—	
Note: Non-APFA team in italics. Thanksgiving Day: November 25.

== Standings ==
1920 APFA standings
	W	L	T	PCT	DIV	DPCT	PF	PA	STK
Akron Pros†	8	0	3	1.000	6–0–3	1.000	151	7	T2
Decatur Staleys	10	1	2	.909	5–1–2	.833	164	21	T1
Buffalo All-Americans	9	1	1	.900	4–1–1	.800	258	32	T1
Chicago Cardinals	6	2	2	.750	3–2–1	.600	101	29	T1
Rock Island Independents	6	2	2	.750	4–2–1	.667	201	49	W1
Dayton Triangles	5	2	2	.714	4–2–2	.667	150	54	L1
Rochester Jeffersons	6	3	2	.667	0–1–0	.000	156	57	T1
Canton Bulldogs	7	4	2	.636	4–3–1	.571	208	57	W1
Detroit Heralds	2	3	3	.400	1–3–0	.250	53	82	T2
Cleveland Tigers	2	4	2	.333	1–4–2	.200	28	46	L1
Chicago Tigers	2	5	1	.286	1–5–1	.167	49	63	W1
Hammond Pros	2	5	0	.286	0–3–0	.000	41	154	L3
Columbus Panhandles	2	6	2	.250	0–5–0	.000	41	121	W1
Muncie Flyers	0	1	0	.000	0–1–0	.000	0	45	L1

† Awarded the Brunswick-Balke Collender Cup and named APFA Champions
by vote of league owners. Staleys claimed a co-title.

== Game summaries ==
=== Game 1: at Rock Island Independents ===
	1	2	3	4	Total
Flyers	0	0	0	0	0
Independents	21	10	7	7	45

October 3, 1920, at Douglas Park

In their only APFA game counted in the standings, the Muncie Flyers played against the Rock Island Independents. It is considered to be one of the first games played with two APFA teams. Since kickoff times were not standardized, it is unknown if the Muncie–Rock Island or Columbus–Dayton game is the first game. In the first quarter, the Independents scored three touchdowns: two from Arnold Wyman and one from Rube Ursella. In the second quarter, Ursella kicked a 25-yard field goal, and Wyman scored from an 86-yard kickoff return. In the third quarter, Sid Nichols had a 5-yard rushing touchdown, and Waddy Kuehl scored a 7-yard rushing touchdown, en route to a final score of the game was 45–0.

=== Game 2: v. Gas City Tigers ===
	1	2	3	4	Total
Flyers	13	6	0	0	19
Tigers	0	0	7	0	7

November 25, 1920, in Gas City, Indiana

It took the Flyers eight weeks in order to have a game played; they accepted the Gas City Tigers' challenge to play in Gas City, Indiana, on November 18. The Tigers were 9–0 and outscored their opponents 443–9 this season. Halfback Mickey Hole scored a 45-yard rushing touchdown three minutes into the game. On the next possession, the Flyers scored again; Kenneth Huffine scored the touchdown, and Cooney Checkaye kicked the point after, which made the score 13–0. Near the beginning of the second quarter, Checkaye scored, but the extra point was missed. The Tigers scored their only touchdown in the game in the third quarter. The final score of the game was 19–7.

=== Game 3: at Muncie Offers More AC ===
	1	2	3	4	Total
Flyers	0	0	14	10	24
Offers More AC	0	0	0	0	0

November 28, 1920, at Walnut Park

After their first victory of the season, the Flyers were challenged by the Muncie Offers More AC. The game was labelled as the Muncie City Championship. Since most of the other local teams' seasons were finished, both Muncie teams hired as many as 20 players for the game. The field was muddy, which caused Offers More AC to fumble the ball several times. In the third quarter, the Flyers scored two touchdowns to give them a 14–0 lead going into the fourth quarter. The Flyers added 10 more points—a touchdown and a field goal—in the final quarter to win the Championship 24–0.

=== Game 4: at Gas City Tigers ===
	1	2	3	4	Total
Flyers	0	0	7	6	13
Tigers	0	7	0	0	7

December 5, 1920, in Gas City, Indiana

The Flyers last game of the 1920 season was against the Gas City Tigers. The Tigers signed up several players to help them defeat the Flyers. The first quarter was scoreless, as the only near score was from a failed drop kick from the Flyers. The first score of the game came in the second quarter. Weaver of the Tigers returned a punt 85 yards for a touchdown. On the Tigers' next possession, they dropped a pass in the endzone on fourth down. Early in the third quarter, a member of the Tigers fumbled, and the Flyers recovered it on the 5-yard line. Huffine score a rushing touchdown on that possession to tie the game 7–7. The last score of the game came from the Flyers; Checkaye returned a punt 60 yards for a touchdown to give the Flyers a 13–7 victory. The Tigers almost scored on their final possession on the game but fumbled.

== Post-season ==
Without any APFA wins, the Flyers could not contend for the APFA Championship. However, with wins against the Gas City Tigers and the Muncie Offers More AC, the Flyers claimed to have won the Indiana State Championship. Sportswriter Bruce Copeland compiled the All-Pro list for the 1920 season, but no player from the Flyers was on the list. Ken Huffine decided to be affiliated with the Chicago Stayles after the 1920 season, and Cooney Checkaye took over the role the following season. It did not help, and the Flyers' final year in the APFA was 1921. As of 2012, no players from the 1920 Muncie Flyers have been enshrined into the Pro Football Hall of Fame.

== Roster ==
The following individuals saw action for the 1920 Muncie Flyers. The number of NFL games played by each follows in parentheses.

No players from the 1920 Muncie Flyers were listed on the 1920 All-Pro Team, and no player has been enshrined in the Pro Football Hall of Fame.

Linemen

- Bobby Berns (1)
- Doc Davis (1)
- Owen Floyd (1)
- Russ Hathaway (1)
- Chuck Helvie (1)
- Babe Hole (1)
- Spencer Pope (1)
- John Redmond
- Jess Reno (1)
- Pete Slane
- Wilfred Smith (1)

Backs

- Cliff Baldwin (1)
- Cooney Checkaye (1)
- Archie Erehart (1)
- Mickey Hole (1)
- Ken Huffine (1)
