= 1920 Columbus Panhandles season =

Sports season

- General manager: Joseph Carr
- Head coach: Ted Nesser
- Home stadium: Neil Park

Results
- Record: 2–6–2 (overall); 0–5 (APFA)
- League place: 13th APFA

The 1920 Columbus Panhandles season was the franchise's inaugural season in the American Professional Football Association (APFA)—later named the National Football League. The season concluded with the team going 2–6–2 and finishing 13th place in the APFA standings. The Panhandles entered the season after a 3–6–1 record in 1919. The team opened the 1920 season with a loss to the Dayton Triangles, and the Panhandles lost five straight until a victory over the Zanesville Mark Grays. Not a single player was on the All-Pro list.

== Offseason ==
The Columbus Panhandles finished their 1919 season with a 3–6–1 record in the Ohio League. On August 20, 1920, a meeting was held at Ralph Hay's automobile attended by representatives of four Ohio League teams: the Canton Bulldogs, the Cleveland Tigers, the Dayton Triangles, and the Akron Pros. At the meeting, they tentatively agreed to introduce a salary cap for the teams, not to sign college players nor players under contract with another team, and became united as the American Professional Football Conference. They then contacted other major professional teams and invited them to a meeting for September 17.

At the meeting in September, representatives of the Rock Island Independents, the Muncie Flyers, the Decatur Staleys, the Racine Cardinals, the Massillon Tigers, the Chicago Cardinals, the Rochester Jeffersons, and the Hammond Pros. The following was achieved during the September 17 meeting: the name of American Professional Football Association was chosen; officers of the league were elected with Jim Thorpe as president; a membership fee of $100 was set; a committee to draft a constitution was named; the secretary of the league was to receive a list of all players used during the season by January 1, 1921; and the trophy that would be awarded to the league champions. Even though the Panhandles were not at the meetings, they were still a charter member of the APFA.

== Regular season ==
The Panhandles played their only home game at Neil Park. Joseph Carr made the team play mostly away games because they were able to travel on the railroads for free. This cut down on stadium cost and saved the team money. The regular season schedule was not a fixed schedule but was created dynamically by each team as the season progressed. Over the course of the 1920 season, the Panhandles played a total of 11 games. Of those 11 games, five were against APFA teams, and the others were against non-APFA teams. Every game played against league teams resulted in a loss.

The records kept for the 1920 season included games played against APFA and non-APFA teams. The Panhandles opened the season with a 14–0 loss to the Dayton Triangles in the first football game with two APFA teams. The previous week, considered week one, the Rock Island Independents played against the St. Paul Ideals in the first APFA game. The Panhandles lost their next five games without scoring a point, until a 10–0 win over the Zanesville Mark Grays. The Panhandles ended the season with a 24–0 victory and finished with a 2–6–2 record.

=== Schedule ===
Game	Date	Opponent	Result	Record	Venue	Attendance	Recap	Sources
1	October 3	at Dayton Triangles	L 0–14	0–1	Triangle Park	"biggest crowd" for pro opener	Recap	
2	October 10	at Akron Pros	L 0–37	0–2	League Park	1,500	Recap	
3	October 17	at Fort Wayne Friars	L 0–14	0–3	League Park	5,000	Recap	
4	October 24	at Detroit Heralds	L 0–6	0–4	Mack Park	"big crowd"	Recap	
5	October 31	at Cleveland Tigers	L 0–7	0–5	League Park	5,000	Recap	
6	November 7	at Zanesville Mark Grays	W 10–0	1–5	Mark Athletic Field	7,000	Recap	
7	November 14	at Buffalo All-Americans	L 7–43	1–6	Canisius Villa	9,000	Recap	
8	November 21	at Zanesville Mark Grays	T 0–0	1–6–1	Mark Athletic Field		Recap	
9	November 25	at Elyria Athletics	T 0–0	1–6–2	Lorain Athletic Field		Recap	
10	December 5	Columbus Wagner Pirates	W 24–0	2–6–2	Neil Park	2,000	Recap	
Note: Non-APFA opponents in italics.

== Game summaries ==
=== Game 1: at Dayton Triangles ===
	1	2	3	4	Total
Panhandles	0	0	0	0	0
Triangles	0	0	7	7	14

October 3, 1920, at Triangle Park

The Panhandles' opening game against the Dayton Triangles is considered to be the first football game between two APFA teams. The Panhandles lost 14–0 to the Triangles. Despite the first two quarters resulting in ties, the crowd was excited. In the second quarter, the Triangles made a goal line stand while the Panhandles had the ball on the 3-yard line. Before halftime, the Triangles' Al Mahrt completed a 30-yard pass to Dutch Thiele, which resulted in the Triangles to having the ball on the 5-yard line. The Triangles' did not score on that possession due to the clock running out.

Early in the third quarter, the Triangles started a possession on their own 35-yard line. Four consecutive run plays carried them to midfield. Then, Lou Partlow had a long run to the 10-yard line. The possession ended with a rushing touchdown from Partlow. The other Triangle score came in the middle of the fourth quarter. Frank Bacon returned a punt return for a 60-yard touchdown. After both touchdowns, George Kinderdine was responsible for the extra points.

=== Game 2: at Akron Pros ===
	1	2	3	4	Total
Panhandles	0	0	0	0	0
Pros	7	14	14	2	37

October 10, 1920, at League Park

Following the loss, the Panhandles played against the Akron Pros. Running back Frank McCormick of the Pros rushed for two touchdowns to give Akron a 14–0 lead in the second quarter. Bob Nash later recovered a fumble in the end zone for the first score from a fumble recovery. Harry Harris and fullback Fred Sweetland also contributed for the Pros, each scoring one rushing touchdown. The defense added another safety in the fourth quarter—which was the first safety in APFA history—to give to Panhandles their second loss of the season, 37–0.

=== Game 3: at Fort Wayne Friars ===
	1	2	3	4	Total
Panhandles	0	0	0	0	0
Friars	7	0	7	0	14

October 17, 1920, at League Park

In their third game of the season, the Panhandles played against the non-APFA Fort Wayne Friars. In the first ten minutes of the game, Lee Snoots was injured and had to miss the rest of the game. In front of 5,000 fans, the Panhandles lost 14–0. Huffine for the Friars scored two rushing touchdowns, one in the first and one in the third. This was the Panhandles' fourth straight loss to the Friars.

=== Game 4: at Detroit Heralds ===
	1	2	3	4	Total
Panhandles	0	0	0	0	0
Heralds	0	6	0	0	6

October 24, 1920, at Mack Park

Following the loss, the Panhandles traveled to play the Detroit Heralds, an APFA team. The Panhandles' passing attack helped them outgain the Heralds, but, according to the Ohio State Journal, it was a close game and "one play decided the outcome." The Heralds' left end, Fitzgerald, intercepted a pass from Frank Nesser and ran it back for an 85-yard touchdown.

=== Game 5: at Cleveland Tigers ===
	1	2	3	4	Total
Panhandles	0	0	0	0	0
Tigers	0	7	0	0	7

October 31, 1920, at League Park

In week 6, the Panhandles played against the Cleveland Tigers. In front of 5,000 fans, the Tigers won 7–0. The lone score came from a rushing touchdown in the second quarter from Charlie Brickley. This was the eighth straight loss for the Panhandles, dating back to 1919, and the seventh straight without scoring. According to football historian Chris Willis, this loss for the Panhandles crushed the city of Columbus and made the Panhandles challenge lesser teams for the rest of the season.

=== Game 6: at Zanesville Mark Greys ===
	1	2	3	4	Total
Panhandles	10	0	0	0	10
Mark Greys	0	0	0	0	0

November 7, 1920, at Mark Athletic Field

The Panhandles recorded their first victory of the season with a 10–0 win against the non-APFA Zanesville Mark Greys. On the day before the game, the Zanesville Signal ran an advertisement to help promote the game, and the city of Zanesville was "excited" to host the Panhandles. In the first quarter, Jim Flower caught a touchdown pass from Frank Nesser. In the same quarter, Nesser kicked a 35-yard field goal. The points scored in the first quarter ended a streak of 28 straight scoreless quarters.

=== Game 7: at Buffalo All-Americans ===
	1	2	3	4	Total
Panhandles	7	0	0	0	7
All-Americans	6	23	7	7	43

November 14, 1920, at Canisius Field

In front of 9,000 fans, the Panhandles played their last against an APFA opponent, the Buffalo All-Americans, in week 8. Coming into the game, the All-Americans had a 6–0 undefeated record. At the end of the first quarter, the game near-even; the score was 7–6, Panhandles. After that, the game "proved disastrous" for the Panhandles. The final score was 43–7; the only score was a receiving touchdown from Homer Ruh. The Panhandles' defense allowed six rushing touchdowns, four of which came from the All-Americans' Smith. The other two came from Anderson and Hughitt. From these six rushing touchdowns, five of the extra points were converted, and the Panhandles' offense allowed a safety.

=== Game 8: at Zanesville Mark Greys ===
	1	2	3	4	Total
Panhandles	0	0	0	0	0
Mark Greys	0	0	0	0	0

November 21, 1920, at Mark Athletic Field

In the Panhandles' rematch against the Mark Greys, the final score was a 0–0 tie. Chris Willis stated the game was a "nightmare" for the Panhandles, and the game felt like a loss for them. The Zanesville Signal claimed the Mark Greys outplayed the Panhandles in every aspect and called the game "one of the best ... of the season." According to Pro-Football-Reference.com, this game was the seventh game in NFL history to result in a 0–0 tie.

=== Game 9: at Elyria Athletics ===
	1	2	3	4	Total
Panhandles	0	0	0	0	0
Athletics	0	0	0	0	0

November 25, 1920, at Lorain Athletic Field

Following the tie to the Mark Greys, the Panhandles traveled to Lorain, Ohio, to play against the Elyria Athletics on Thanksgiving Day. The result of the game was another 0–0 tie, making it the seventh time in nine games the Panhandles were held scoreless. Chris Willis stated this tie was not as bad as the previous weeks because the Athletics had old players from the Akron Indians, a winning team in the Ohio League.

=== Game 10: vs Columbus Wagner Pirates ===
	1	2	3	4	Total
Wagner Pirates	0	0	0	0	0
Panhandles	3	0	14	7	24

December 5, 1920, at Neil Park

In their final date of the 1920 season, the Panhandles played their first and only home game, facing the Columbus Wagner Pirates. In front of a crowd of 2,000, the Panhandles won their second game of the season 24–0. In the first quarter, Frank Nesser scored the first points of the game with a 42-yard field goal. Even though the first half score was 3–0, the Panhandles heavily outplayed the Wanger Pirates. In the third quarter, Snoots ran for two rushing touchdowns. In the last quarter, Frank Nesser also contributed with a rushing touchdown. Despite Nesser kicking a field goal early in the game, Jim Flowers was the person who kicked the extra points in the game. This victory over the Wagner Pirates allowed the Panhandles to win their "city's championship".

== Standings ==
1920 APFA standings
	W	L	T	PCT	DIV	DPCT	PF	PA	STK
Akron Pros†	8	0	3	1.000	6–0–3	1.000	151	7	T2
Decatur Staleys	10	1	2	.909	5–1–2	.833	164	21	T1
Buffalo All-Americans	9	1	1	.900	4–1–1	.800	258	32	T1
Chicago Cardinals	6	2	2	.750	3–2–1	.600	101	29	T1
Rock Island Independents	6	2	2	.750	4–2–1	.667	201	49	W1
Dayton Triangles	5	2	2	.714	4–2–2	.667	150	54	L1
Rochester Jeffersons	6	3	2	.667	0–1–0	.000	156	57	T1
Canton Bulldogs	7	4	2	.636	4–3–1	.571	208	57	W1
Detroit Heralds	2	3	3	.400	1–3–0	.250	53	82	T2
Cleveland Tigers	2	4	2	.333	1–4–2	.200	28	46	L1
Chicago Tigers	2	5	1	.286	1–5–1	.167	49	63	W1
Hammond Pros	2	5	0	.286	0–3–0	.000	41	154	L3
Columbus Panhandles	2	6	2	.250	0–5–0	.000	41	121	W1
Muncie Flyers	0	1	0	.000	0–1–0	.000	0	45	L1

† Awarded the Brunswick-Balke Collender Cup and named APFA Champions
by vote of league owners. Staleys claimed a co-title.

== Roster ==
The list of players and the coaching staff is gathered from Uniform Numbers of the NFL: Pre-1933 Defunct Teams, The Columbus Panhandles, and Pro-Football-Reference.com.

=== Players ===
Name	Position
Lawrence “Heine” Spiers	QB
Otto Beckwith	HB
Hi Brigham	G
John Davis	FB/HB/QB
Charlie Essman	G
Jim Flower	E
Hal Gaulke	QB/FB
Orlan Houck	G
Oscar Kuehner	T
Frank Lone Star	G/T
Wilkie Moody	HB/FB/G
Joe Mulbarger	T
Frank Nesser	FB/T/G
Phil Nesser	G
Ted Nesser	G
Dwight Peabody	E
Homer Ruh	E
John Schneider	HB
Lee Snoots	HB
Will Waite	C
Oscar Wolford	FB/G
Howard Yerges	HB

=== Coaching staff ===
Name	Position
Joe Carr	Manager
Ted Nesser	Head coach
