= 1920 Chicago Cardinals season =

American football team season

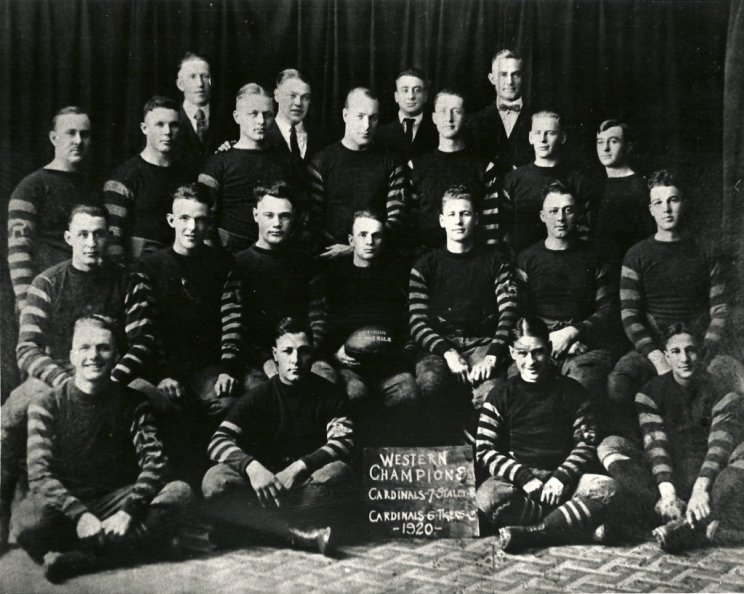
- Owner: Chris O'Brien
- Head coach: Paddy Driscoll
- Home stadium: Normal Park

Results
- Record: 3–2–1 APFA (6–2–2 overall)
- League place: 4th APFA

The 1920 Chicago Cardinals season was the teams' inaugural season in the American Professional Football Association (soon to be the National Football League). Although the Cardinals' existence traced back as far as 1899, this was their first season as a member of the American Professional Football Association.

The team was also known as the Racine Cardinals in this period, a name borrowed from Racine Avenue, location of Normal Park in Chicago, where the team played its home games. In an effort to reduce confusion and capitalize on the name of a major metropolis, the name of the team was officially changed to "Chicago Cardinals" by owner Chris O'Brien on October 20, 1920, however.

Their final two games of the season against the Chicago Stayms Foresters were played after the APFA season was officially over and did not count towards the standings.

The last remaining active member of the 1920 Chicago Cardinals was Paddy Driscoll, who retired after the 1929 season.

== Background ==
The Chicago Cardinals finished 4-3-0 in their 1919 season in the Chicago Football league Following the 1919 season, representatives of four Ohio League teams—the Canton Bulldogs, the Cleveland Tigers, the Dayton Triangles, and the Akron Pros—called a meeting on August 20, 1920, to discuss the formation of a new league. At the meeting, they tentatively agreed on a salary cap and pledged not to sign college players or players already under contract with other teams. They also agreed on a name for the circuit: the American Professional Football Conference. Then they contacted other major professional teams and invited them to a meeting for September 17.

At that meeting, held at Bulldogs owner Ralph Hay's Hupmobile showroom in Canton, representatives of the Rock Island Independents, the Muncie Flyers, the Decatur Staleys, the Massillon Tigers, the Cardinals, and the Hammond Pros agreed to join the league. Representatives of the Buffalo All-Americans and Rochester Jeffersons could not attend the meeting, but sent letters to Hay asking to be included in the league. Team representatives changed the league's name slightly to the American Professional Football Association and elected officers, installing Jim Thorpe as president. Under the new league structure, teams created their schedules dynamically as the season progressed, and representatives of each team voted to determine the winner of the APFA trophy.

After joining the league, Cardinals owner Chris O'Brien signed former Northwestern star halfback John "Paddy" Driscoll to a contract paying him $300 per game, with a guarantee of 10 games. The deal made the highly skilled Driscoll among the best compensated players in the fledgling league. More than just a runner or a passer, Driscoll could also score via the drop kick. Driscoll still holds several NFL dropkicking records, including most successful drop kicks in one game (4), in a career (49), and longest drop kick converted (50 yards, twice).

== Schedule ==
| Game | Date | Opponent | Result | Record | Venue | Attendance | Recap | Sources |
|---|---|---|---|---|---|---|---|---|
| 1 | October 10 | at Chicago Tigers | T 0–0 | 0–0–1 | Cubs Park | 7,500+ | Recap | |
| — | October 17 | at Moline Athletics | W 33–3 | — | St. Rita's Field | | Recap | |
| 2 | October 24 | at Rock Island Independents | L 0–7 | 0–1–1 | Douglas Park | 4,000 | Recap | |
| 3 | October 31 | Detroit Heralds | W 21–0 | 1–1–1 | Cubs Park | 3,000 | Recap | |
| 4 | November 7 | at Chicago Tigers | W 6–3 | 2–1–1 | Cubs Park | 7,000 | Recap | |
| — | November 14 | Cincinnati Celts | W 20–0 | — | Normal Park | 5,000 | Recap | — |
| — | November 21 | Lansing Oldsmobiles | W 14–0 | — | Normal Park | 3,500 | Recap | |
| 5 | November 28 | Decatur Staleys | W 7–6 | 3–1–1 | Normal Park | 5,000 | Recap | |
| 6 | December 5 | Decatur Staleys | L 0–10 | 3–2–1 | Cubs Park | 11,000 | Recap | |
| — | December 19 | at Chicago Stayms | T 14–14 | — | Pyott Field | | Recap | — |
| — | January 9, 1921 | Chicago Stayms | W 6–0 | — | Normal Park | 3,000 | — | |
Note: Non-APFA teams in italics.

== Standings ==
1920 APFA standings
| | W | L | T | PCT | DIV | DPCT | PF | PA | STK |
|---|---|---|---|---|---|---|---|---|---|
| Akron Pros† | 8 | 0 | 3 | 1.000 | 6–0–3 | 1.000 | 151 | 7 | T2 |
| Decatur Staleys | 10 | 1 | 2 | .909 | 5–1–2 | .833 | 164 | 21 | T1 |
| Buffalo All-Americans | 9 | 1 | 1 | .900 | 4–1–1 | .800 | 258 | 32 | T1 |
| Chicago Cardinals | 6 | 2 | 2 | .750 | 3–2–1 | .600 | 101 | 29 | T1 |
| Rock Island Independents | 6 | 2 | 2 | .750 | 4–2–1 | .667 | 201 | 49 | W1 |
| Dayton Triangles | 5 | 2 | 2 | .714 | 4–2–2 | .667 | 150 | 54 | L1 |
| Rochester Jeffersons | 6 | 3 | 2 | .667 | 0–1–0 | .000 | 156 | 57 | T1 |
| Canton Bulldogs | 7 | 4 | 2 | .636 | 4–3–1 | .571 | 208 | 57 | W1 |
| Detroit Heralds | 2 | 3 | 3 | .400 | 1–3–0 | .250 | 53 | 82 | T2 |
| Cleveland Tigers | 2 | 4 | 2 | .333 | 1–4–2 | .200 | 28 | 46 | L1 |
| Chicago Tigers | 2 | 5 | 1 | .286 | 1–5–1 | .167 | 49 | 63 | W1 |
| Hammond Pros | 2 | 5 | 0 | .286 | 0–3–0 | .000 | 41 | 154 | L3 |
| Columbus Panhandles | 2 | 6 | 2 | .250 | 0–5–0 | .000 | 41 | 121 | W1 |
| Muncie Flyers | 0 | 1 | 0 | .000 | 0–1–0 | .000 | 0 | 45 | L1 |

† Awarded the Brunswick-Balke Collender Cup and named APFA Champions
by vote of league owners. Staleys claimed a co-title.

== Game summaries ==
=== Game 1: at Chicago Tigers ===
| | 1 | 2 | 3 | 4 | Total |
|---|---|---|---|---|---|
| Cardinals | 0 | 0 | 0 | 0 | 0 |
| Tigers | 0 | 0 | 0 | 0 | 0 |

October 10, 1920, at Cubs Park

The Chicago Tigers hosted the Chicago Cardinals at Cubs Park in a scoreless 0–0 tie. While much of what happened in the quiet affair is unknown, it would eventually set the precedent for another, more important game in Week 7 that year.

=== Game 2: vs. Moline Athletics ===
| | 1 | 2 | 3 | 4 | Total |
|---|---|---|---|---|---|
| Athletics | 0 | 0 | 3 | 0 | 3 |
| Cardinals | 0 | 27 | 6 | 0 | 33 |

October 17, 1920, at St. Rita's Stadium

The Cardinals improved their record to 1-0-1 on the season with a resounding victory over the semi-pro team from Moline, Illinois. A massive four touchdown second quarter spelled demise for Moline, with the Cardinals' putting up long runs by star halfback Paddy Driscoll and his backfield mate, Harry Curran. Chicago's defense was stifling, forcing Moline to settle for a third quarter field goal to avert a shutout.

=== Game 3: at Rock Island Independents ===
| | 1 | 2 | 3 | 4 | Total |
|---|---|---|---|---|---|
| Cardinals | 0 | 0 | 0 | 0 | 0 |
| Independents | 0 | 7 | 0 | 0 | 7 |

October 24, 1920, at Douglas Park

The Rock Island Independents hosted the Cardinals at Douglas Park, with the Cardinals losing 7–0 in front of 4,000 spectators. Their record fell to 1–1–1 as a result. The only touchdown in the game was a 6-yard pass from Sid Nichols to Arnie Wyman in the second quarter. Nichols also kicked the extra point.

=== Game 4: vs. Detroit Heralds ===
| | 1 | 2 | 3 | 4 | Total |
|---|---|---|---|---|---|
| Heralds | 0 | 0 | 0 | 0 | 0 |
| Cardinals | 0 | 0 | 21 | 0 | 21 |

October 31, 1920, at Cubs Park

In a 21–0 rout of the Heralds with 3,000 fans in attendance, the Cardinals improved to 2–1–1 on the season. All of the touchdowns scored were in the third quarter, two of which were blocked punts returned to the end zone by Lenny Sachs and Leo Chappell. The third touchdown was a 10-yard rushing touchdown by Paddy Driscoll, who also kicked each extra point.

=== Game 5: at Chicago Tigers ===
| | 1 | 2 | 3 | 4 | Total |
|---|---|---|---|---|---|
| Cardinals | 0 | 6 | 0 | 0 | 6 |
| Tigers | 3 | 0 | 0 | 0 | 3 |

November 7, 1920, at Cubs Park

In front of 7,000 fans, the Tigers hosted the Cardinals in a game that, according to legend, decided the fate of both teams, with the loser required to fold their team. Responding to the Tigers' 27-yard field goal by Johnny Barrett in the first quarter, Paddy Driscoll ran for 40 yards to score the game-winning touchdown for the Cardinals in the second quarter. The extra point was no good. While neither team ended their season on the spot, and the Tigers and Cardinals fell and rose to 1–3–1 and 3–1–1, respectively, the Tigers would fold at the end of the 1920 season.

=== Game 6: vs. Cincinnati Celts ===
| | 1 | 2 | 3 | 4 | Total |
|---|---|---|---|---|---|
| Celts | 0 | 0 | 0 | 0 | 0 |
| Cardinals | 6 | 14 | 0 | 0 | 20 |

November 14, 1920, at Normal Park

In a 20–0 shutout victory, the Cardinals hosted the Cincinnati Celts. Two of the three touchdowns came from Nick McInerney and Paddy Driscoll running the ball in from unknown distances. Leo Chappell recovered a fumble and ran another in as well. Driscoll was 2-for-3 in extra point attempts, seemingly missing after McInerney's touchdown.

=== Game 7: vs. Lansing Oldsmobiles ===
| | 1 | 2 | 3 | 4 | Total |
|---|---|---|---|---|---|
| Oldsmobiles | 0 | 0 | 0 | 0 | 0 |
| Cardinals | 0 | 7 | 7 | 0 | 14 |

November 21, 1920, at Normal Park

The Cardinals hosted the Lansing Oldsmobiles in a 14–0 win. The pair of scores came from two rushing touchdowns from Harry Curran and Paddy Driscoll in the second and third quarters, respectively. Driscoll also kicked both extra points.

=== Game 8: vs. Decatur Staleys ===
| | 1 | 2 | 3 | 4 | Total |
|---|---|---|---|---|---|
| Staleys | 6 | 0 | 0 | 0 | 6 |
| Cardinals | 0 | 0 | 7 | 0 | 7 |

November 28, 1920, at Normal Park

In the first of two matchups, the Cardinals won 7–6 against the Decatur Staleys in front of a crowd of 5,000 fans. The two major scores of the game were a fumble recovery for a touchdown by Bob Koehler for Decatur and a 20-yard fumble recovery for a touchdown by Lenny Sachs for the Cardinals. Paddy Driscoll kicked the extra point as well.

=== Game 9: vs. Decatur Staleys ===
| | 1 | 2 | 3 | 4 | Total |
|---|---|---|---|---|---|
| Staleys | 0 | 7 | 0 | 3 | 10 |
| Cardinals | 0 | 0 | 0 | 0 | 0 |

December 5, 1920, at Cubs Park

In a back-to-back rematch, the Staleys struck back with a 10–0 shutout win over the Cardinals. The only two scores of the game were a Bob Koehler 2-yard rushing touchdown and a Dutch Sternaman field goal from an unknown distance. Sternaman also kicked the extra point after the touchdown by Koehler.

=== Game 10: at Chicago Stayms ===
| | 1 | 2 | 3 | 4 | Total |
|---|---|---|---|---|---|
| Cardinals | 0 | 0 | 8 | 6 | 14 |
| Stayms | 0 | 0 | 8 | 6 | 14 |

December 19, 1920, at Pyott's Park

The Chicago Stayms hosted the Cardinals in a 14–14 tie. Only parts of this game survived in detail, with a supposed rushing touchdown scored by Nick McInerney for the Cardinals and a blocked punt recovered and scored by an unknown Staym. The other eight points apiece were scored by unknown means. This game, along with a supposed second matchup, did not count towards the 1920 APFA season, as it had ended.

=== Post-season: vs. Chicago Stayms ===
| | 1 | 2 | 3 | 4 | Total |
|---|---|---|---|---|---|
| Cardinals | 0 | 0 | 0 | 0 | 0 |
| Stayms | 0 | 0 | 0 | 0 | 0 |

January ??, 1921, at ????

Any information about this game, or if it even occurred, is unknown.

== Roster ==
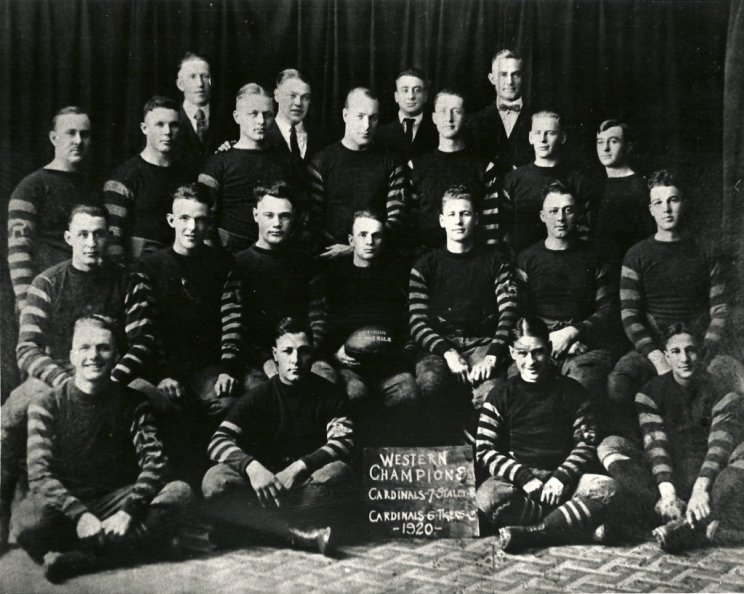
Team photo of the 1920 Chicago Cardinals. Top row: Kantenberger, unknown, unknown, O'Brian (owner); 3rd row: Smith, Curran, Knight, Gillies, Clark, Halstrom, O'Conner; 2nd row: LaRosa, Carey, McInerney, Paddy Driscoll (with ball) Florence, Brennan, Chappell; Front row: Whalen, Zoia, Plunkett, Sachs

Chicago Cardinals 1920 roster (game appearances in parentheses)
| Linemen: Willis Brennan (9); Joe Carey (7); Leo Chappell (8); Bill Clark (3); Paul Florence (9); Bill Fortune (1); Fred Gillies (9); Charlie Knight (6); George Knight (2); Louie Kolls (1); Paul LaRosa (9); Red O'Connor (3); Lenny Sachs (8); Bill Whalen (6); Clyde Zoia (8) | Backs: Len Charpier (1); Harry Curran (9); Paddy Driscoll (9); Dick Egan (7); Bernie Halstrom (8); Nick McInerney (8); Joseph Plunkett (1); Pete Schultz (1) |
