= 1920 Chicago Tigers season =

National Football League team season

- Owner: Rube Cook
- Head coach: Guil Falcon
- Home stadium: Cubs Park

Results
- Record: 1–5–1 APFA (2–5–1 overall)
- League place: T-11th APFA

The 1920 Chicago Tigers season was their sole season in the National Football League. The team finished 2–5–1, tying them for eleventh in the league.

== Offseason ==
The Chicago Tigers were formed in 1920. After the 1919 season, representatives of four Ohio League, a loose organization of professional football teams, teams—the Canton Bulldogs, the Cleveland Tigers, the Dayton Triangles, and the Akron Pros—called a meeting on August 20, 1920, to discuss the formation of a new league. At the meeting, they tentatively agreed on a salary cap and pledged not to sign college players or players already under contract with other teams. They also agreed on a name for the circuit: the American Professional Football Conference. They then invited other professional teams to a second meeting on September 17.

At that meeting, held at Bulldogs owner Ralph Hay's Hupmobile showroom in Canton, representatives of the Rock Island Independents, the Muncie Flyers, the Decatur Staleys, the Racine Cardinals, the Massillon Tigers, the Chicago Cardinals, and the Hammond Pros agreed to join the league. Representatives of the Buffalo All-Americans and Rochester Jeffersons could not attend the meeting but sent letters to Hay asking to be included in the league. Team representatives changed the league's name slightly to the American Professional Football Association and elected officers, installing Jim Thorpe as president. Under the new league structure, teams created their schedules dynamically as the season progressed, so there were no minimum or maximum number of games needed to be played. Also, representatives of each team voted to determine the winner of the APFA trophy.

== Schedule ==
Game	Date	Opponent	Result	Record	Venue	Attendance	Recap	Sources
1	October 10	Chicago Cardinals	T 0–0	0–0–1	Cubs Park	7,500+	Recap	
2	October 17	Detroit Heralds	W 12–0	1–0–1	Cubs Park	5,000	Recap	
3	October 24	Decatur Staleys	L 0–10	1–1–1	Cubs Park	5,000	Recap	
4	October 31	at Rock Island Independents	L 7–20	1–2–1	Douglas Park		Recap	
5	November 7	Chicago Cardinals	L 3–6	1–3–1	Cubs Park	7,000	Recap	
6	November 14	at Canton Bulldogs	L 0–21	1–4–1	Lakeside Park	8,000	Recap	
7	November 25	Decatur Staleys	L 0–6	1–5–1	Cubs Park	8,000	Recap	
—	November 28	Chicago Thorn-Tornadoes	W 27–0	—	Cubs Park		Recap	—
Note: Non-APFA teams in italics. Thanksgiving Day: November 25.

== Game summaries ==
=== Game 4: at Rock Island Independents ===
	1	2	3	4	Total
Tigers	0	7	0	0	7
Independents	6	0	7	7	20

October 31, 1920, at Douglas Park, Rock Island, Illinois

On Halloween, the Tigers played the Rock Island Independents. The Independents out-gained the Tigers in first downs, 14 to 3. The first score of the game was a 6-yard rushing touchdown by Independents' Fred Chicken; however, the extra point was missed, so the score was only 6–0. The Tigers took the lead in the second quarter after Annan had a 2-yard rushing touchdown. Chicken ended up having two rushing touchdowns, and Wyman had another rushing touchdown, as the Independents beat the Tigers 20–7.

=== Game 6: at Canton Bulldogs ===
	1	2	3	4	Total
Tigers	0	0	0	0	0
Bulldogs	0	14	7	0	21

November 14, 1920, at Lakeside Park, Canton Ohio

The Tigers' next matchup was against the Canton Bulldogs. Hay cancelled his game against the Hammond Pros and decided to challenge the Tigers instead because he believed the Tigers were a better team. The first scoring came in the second quarter, when the Bulldogs' Bob Higgins recovered a fumble and ran it back for a touchdown. In the same quarter, Henry caught an interception and ran it back 50 yards for a touchdown. Calac then ran for a one-yard touchdown in the third quarter to seal the 21–0 win.

== Standings ==
1920 APFA standings
	W	L	T	PCT	DIV	DPCT	PF	PA	STK
Akron Pros†	8	0	3	1.000	6–0–3	1.000	151	7	T2
Decatur Staleys	10	1	2	.909	5–1–2	.833	164	21	T1
Buffalo All-Americans	9	1	1	.900	4–1–1	.800	258	32	T1
Chicago Cardinals	6	2	2	.750	3–2–1	.600	101	29	T1
Rock Island Independents	6	2	2	.750	4–2–1	.667	201	49	W1
Dayton Triangles	5	2	2	.714	4–2–2	.667	150	54	L1
Rochester Jeffersons	6	3	2	.667	0–1–0	.000	156	57	T1
Canton Bulldogs	7	4	2	.636	4–3–1	.571	208	57	W1
Detroit Heralds	2	3	3	.400	1–3–0	.250	53	82	T2
Cleveland Tigers	2	4	2	.333	1–4–2	.200	28	46	L1
Chicago Tigers	2	5	1	.286	1–5–1	.167	49	63	W1
Hammond Pros	2	5	0	.286	0–3–0	.000	41	154	L3
Columbus Panhandles	2	6	2	.250	0–5–0	.000	41	121	W1
Muncie Flyers	0	1	0	.000	0–1–0	.000	0	45	L1

† Awarded the Brunswick-Balke Collender Cup and named APFA Champions
by vote of league owners. Staleys claimed a co-title.

== Roster ==
1920 Chicago Cardinals roster
Quarterbacks (QB): – Milt Ghee; Running backs (RB): – Dunc Annan TB; – Johnny Barrett (American football) TB; – Ralph Capron WB; – Ben Derr TB; – Alfred Eissler FB; – Guil Falcon FB; – Grover Malone WB; Wide receivers (WR): – N/A; Tight ends (TE): – N/A	Offensive linemen (OL): – Sid Bennett T; – John Bosdett; – Garland Buckeye; – Paul Des Jardien C; – Dick Falcon; – Emmett Keefe; – Oscar Knop; – Neil Mathews; – Jack Meagher; – Jock Mungavin; – Dick Pierce; – Lew Reeve; – Frank Rydzewski; – Walter Voight; – Pete Volz; Defensive linemen (DL): – Sid Bennett DT; – John Bosdett DE; – Garland Buckeye; – Dick Falcon; – Emmett Keefe; – Oscar Knop DE; – Neil Mathews DT; – Jack Meagher DE; – Jock Mungavin DE; – Dick Pierce; – Lew Reeve DT; – Frank Rydzewski DT; – Walter Voight; – Pete Volz	Linebackers (LB): – Alfred Eissler; – Guil Falcon; Defensive backs (DB): – Dunc Annan; – Johnny Barrett (American football); – Ralph Capron; – Ben Derr; – Milt Ghee; – Grover Malone; Special teams (ST): – N/A	Practice squad: – N/A; Reserve: – N/A; Rookies in italics 23 active, 0 reserve, 0 practice squad
