= 1920 Canton Bulldogs season =

Sports season

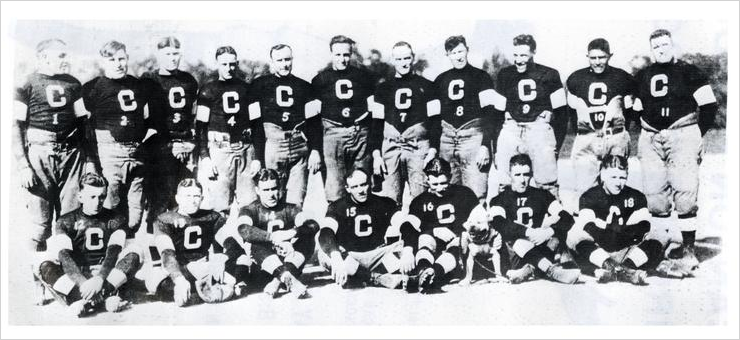
- Canton Bulldogs team.
- Owner: Ralph Hay
- Head coach: Jim Thorpe
- Home stadium: League Field

Results
- Record: 7–4–2 Overall; 4-3-1 APFA
- League place: 8th

The 1920 Canton Bulldogs season was the franchise's sixteenth and its first in the American Professional Football Association (APFA), which became the National Football League two years later. Jim Thorpe, the APFA's president, was Canton's coach and a back who played on the team. The Bulldogs entered the season coming off a 9–0–1 performance as Ohio League champions in 1919. The team opened the season with a 48–0 victory over the Pitcairn Quakers, and finished with a 7–4–2 record, taking eighth place in the 14-team APFA. A then-record crowd of 17,000 fans watched Canton's week 12 game against Union AA of Phoenixville.

The 1920 season was Thorpe's last with the Bulldogs. Thorpe, who was of mixed American Indian ancestry, left after the season to organize and play for an all-Native American team in LaRue, Ohio. Cap Edwards replaced Thorpe as the team's coach, and Wilbur Henry, Cub Buck, Harrie Dadmun, Joe Guyon, and Pete Calac were named to the All-Pro list. Three 1920 Bulldogs players—Thorpe, Guyon and Pete Henry—were later elected to the Pro Football Hall of Fame.

== Offseason ==
Representatives of four Ohio League teams—the Bulldogs, the Cleveland Tigers, the Dayton Triangles, and the Akron Pros—called a meeting on August 20, 1920, to discuss the formation of a new league. At the meeting, they tentatively agreed on a salary cap and pledged not to sign college players or players already under contract with other teams. They also agreed on a name for the circuit: the American Professional Football Conference. They then invited other professional teams to a second meeting on September 17. At that meeting, held at Bulldogs owner Ralph Hay's Hupmobile showroom in Canton, representatives of the Rock Island Independents, the Muncie Flyers, the Decatur Staleys, the Racine Cardinals, the Massillon Tigers, the Chicago Cardinals, and the Hammond Pros agreed to join the league. Representatives of the Buffalo All-Americans and Rochester Jeffersons could not attend the meeting, but sent letters to Hay asking to be included in the league. Team representatives changed the league's name slightly to the American Professional Football Association and elected officers, installing Jim Thorpe as president. Under the new league structure, teams created their schedules dynamically as the season progressed, and representatives of each team voted to determine the winner of the APFA trophy.

== Schedule ==
Game	Date	Opponent	Result	Record	Venue	Attendance	Recap	Sources
1	October 3	Pitcairn Quakers	W 48–0	1–0	Lakeside Park		Recap	
2	October 10	Toledo Maroons	W 42–0	2–0	Lakeside Park		Recap	
3	October 17	Cleveland Tigers	W 7–0	3–0	Lakeside Park	7,000	Recap	
4	October 24	at Dayton Triangles	T 20–20	3–0–1	Triangle Park	5,000	Recap	
5	October 31	Akron Pros	L 0–10	3–1–1	Lakeside Park	6,000	Recap	
6	November 7	at Cleveland Tigers	W 18–0	4–1–1	Dunn Field	8,000	Recap	
7	November 14	Chicago Tigers	W 21–0	5–1–1	Lakeside Park	8,000	Recap	
8	November 21	at Buffalo All-Americans	W 3–0	6–1–1	Buffalo Baseball Park	9,000	Recap	
9	November 25	at Akron Pros	L 0–7	6–2–1	League Field	6,500	Recap	
—	November 28	at Rock Island Independents	canceled					
10	December 4	at Buffalo All-Americans	L 3–7	6–3–1	Polo Grounds	10,000	Recap	
11	December 5	at Washington Glee Club	T 0–0	6–3–2	New Haven, Connecticut	3,000	Recap	
12	December 11	at Union AA of Phoenixville	L 7–13	6–4–2	Phillies Park	17,000	Recap	
13	December 18	at Richmond AC	W 39–0	7–4–2	Boulevard Field		Recap	
Note: Non-APFA teams appear in italics. Thanksgiving Day: November 25.

== Standings ==
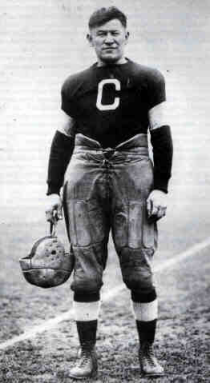
Jim Thorpe, player-coach of the Canton Bulldogs

1920 APFA standings
	W	L	T	PCT	DIV	DPCT	PF	PA	STK
Akron Pros†	8	0	3	1.000	6–0–3	1.000	151	7	T2
Decatur Staleys	10	1	2	.909	5–1–2	.833	164	21	T1
Buffalo All-Americans	9	1	1	.900	4–1–1	.800	258	32	T1
Chicago Cardinals	6	2	2	.750	3–2–1	.600	101	29	T1
Rock Island Independents	6	2	2	.750	4–2–1	.667	201	49	W1
Dayton Triangles	5	2	2	.714	4–2–2	.667	150	54	L1
Rochester Jeffersons	6	3	2	.667	0–1–0	.000	156	57	T1
Canton Bulldogs	7	4	2	.636	4–3–1	.571	208	57	W1
Detroit Heralds	2	3	3	.400	1–3–0	.250	53	82	T2
Cleveland Tigers	2	4	2	.333	1–4–2	.200	28	46	L1
Chicago Tigers	2	5	1	.286	1–5–1	.167	49	63	W1
Hammond Pros	2	5	0	.286	0–3–0	.000	41	154	L3
Columbus Panhandles	2	6	2	.250	0–5–0	.000	41	121	W1
Muncie Flyers	0	1	0	.000	0–1–0	.000	0	45	L1

† Awarded the Brunswick-Balke Collender Cup and named APFA Champions
by vote of league owners. Staleys claimed a co-title.

== Game summaries ==
=== Game 1: vs. Pitcairn Quakers ===
	1	2	3	4	Total
Quakers	0	0	0	0	0
Bulldogs	34	0	0	14	48

October 3, 1920, at Lakeside Park

The Bulldogs opened the 1920 season against the Pitcairn Quakers. The team got out to a quick lead and was never in danger, scoring 34 points in the first quarter as back Joe Guyon rushed for three touchdowns, tackle Pete Henry caught a 15-yard touchdown pass from back Tex Grigg, and back Johnny Hendren returned an interception for a touchdown. The Bulldogs were only forced to punt once in the game, and did not attempt to score in the second and third quarters because of the large lead. In the fourth quarter, however, end Bunny Corcoran caught a 35-yard touchdown pass from Guyon, and back Ike Martin ran for a one-yard touchdown. The final score was 48–0, and Guyon was the offensive star.

=== Game 2: vs. Toledo Maroons ===
	1	2	3	4	Total
Maroon	0	0	0	0	0
Bulldogs	7	14	14	7	42

October 10, 1920, at Lakeside Park

The Bulldogs were scheduled to play their second game against the Rochester Jeffersons, but faced the Toledo Maroons after that match was cancelled. For the second game in a row the Bulldogs scored over 40 points in a shutout as Martin and Guyon dominated on offense. Martin scored the first touchdown of the game with a run in the first quarter. In the second quarter, Hendren scored a rushing touchdown, and end Tom Whelan caught a touchdown pass from Grigg. In the third quarter, Martin caught a touchdown pass from Grigg, and Grigg rushed for another. The Bulldogs' final score was a rushing touchdown from back Pete Calac in the fourth quarter. The final score was 48–0. The Maroons never got close to scoring and did not make a single a first down.

=== Game 3: vs. Cleveland Tigers ===
	1	2	3	4	Total
Tigers	0	0	0	0	0
Bulldogs	7	0	0	0	7

October 17, 1920, at Lakeside Park

The Bulldogs next faced the Cleveland Tigers, their first APFA opponent, and won 7–0 before a crowd of 7,000 people. Despite the Bulldogs' 15 first downs, the only score of the game came on Martin's 7-yard touchdown run in the first quarter. Thorpe made his season debut in the game, coming in as a substitute in the fourth quarter.

=== Game 4: at Dayton Triangles ===
	1	2	3	4	Total
Bulldogs	7	7	3	3	20
Triangles	0	14	6	0	20

October 24, 1920, at Triangle Park

Bulldogs battled the Dayton Triangles in week five. The Bulldogs opened the scoring in the first quarter on a two-yard rushing touchdown by Pete Calac. But the Triangles came back in the second quarter, scoring twice: back Frank Bacon had a four-yard rushing touchdown, and end Dave Reese had a 50-yard receiving touchdown. Guyon scored a 22-yard rushing touchdown during the corner, but the extra point sailed wide. In the third quarter, the Triangles responded with a 3-yard rushing touchdown by back Lou Partlow, but Dayton missed the extra point to make the score 20–14. Thorpe then came into the game, and kicked a 45-yard field goal to bring his team within three points. In the final minutes, Thorpe kicked another 35-yard field goal to tie it. The Triangles were the first team to score on the Bulldogs since the opening game of the previous year.

=== Game 5: vs. Akron Pros ===
	1	2	3	4	Total
Pros	3	7	0	0	10
Bulldogs	0	0	0	0	0

October 31, 1920, at Lakeside Park

The Bulldogs' next opponent was the Akron Pros, who were undefeated at the time and were gaining attention around the league. The game was the first of a two-game series between the Bulldogs and Pros, considered to be two of the best teams in the country. In the first quarter, after an exchange of punts, Pros tackle Charlie Copley kicked a 38-yard field goal. On a Bulldog possession at midfield, a Gilroy pass was tipped by the Pros' Copley and Bob Nash. Pros tackle Pike Johnson caught the ball before it landed and ran 55 yards for a touchdown. In the third quarter, Jim Thorpe came into the game but could not get the Bulldogs back into the game.

=== Game 6: at Cleveland Tigers ===
	1	2	3	4	Total
Bulldogs	0	14	2	2	18
Tigers	0	0	0	0	0

November 7, 1920, at Dunn Field

Coming off their first loss, the Bulldogs faced the Cleveland Tigers in week seven. Neither team scored in the first quarter, but the Bulldogs ran for two touchdowns in the second. Calac and Grigg had 6- and 15-yard rushing touchdowns. The Bulldogs' defense forced two safeties—one in the third and one in the fourth quarter—to win the game 18–0.

=== Game 7: vs. Chicago Tigers ===
	1	2	3	4	Total
Tigers	0	0	0	0	0
Bulldogs	0	14	7	0	21

November 14, 1920, at Lakeside Park

The Bulldogs' next matchup was against the Chicago Tigers. The first scoring came in the second quarter, when Higgins recovered a fumble and ran it back for a touchdown. In the same quarter, Henry caught an interception and ran it back 50 yards for a touchdown. Calac then ran for a one-yard touchdown in the third quarter to seal the 21–0 win.

=== Game 8: at Buffalo All-Americans ===
	1	2	3	4	Total
Bulldogs	0	0	0	3	3
All-Americans	0	0	0	0	0

November 21, 1920, at Buffalo Baseball Park

In week nine, the Bulldogs played the Buffalo All-Americans, who were undefeated at the time. Thorpe started the game but came out at halftime because he believed it would end in a tie. Both teams were slowed by a muddy field, and the football became soggy after three quarters. The lone score of the game came with under four minutes to play: a field goal from the Bulldogs' Feeney. The game was the only loss of the season for the All-Americans.

=== Game 9: at Akron Pros ===
	1	2	3	4	Total
Bulldogs	0	0	0	0	0
Pros	7	0	0	0	7

November 25, 1920, at League Park

In week ten, the Bulldogs played the Pros for the second time in the season. In the first quarter, a fumbled punt by the Bulldogs gave the Pros the ball at their 32-yard line. On the ensuing drive, the Pros passed for the game's lone score, a touchdown from King to Nash. The Bulldogs lost 7–0 in the first professional game played on Thanksgiving Day, which launched a yearly tradition.

=== Game 10: at Buffalo All-Americans ===
	1	2	3	4	Total
Bulldogs	0	0	3	0	3
All-Americans	0	0	0	7	7

December 4, 1920, at Polo Grounds

The following week, the Bulldogs played their second game against the All-Americans, losing 7–3. The Bulldogs did not get a first down or complete a pass during the game, but Thorpe kicked a field goal in the third quarter after a fumble recovery for the team's only score. In the fourth quarter, All-Americans tackle Youngstrom blocked a Thorpe punt and returned it for a touchdown. The Sunday Chronicle named Thorpe, Henry and Lowe as the Bulldogs' stars, while Anderson, Youngstrom, and Miller were the standouts for the All-Americans.

=== Game 11: at Washington Glee Club ===
	1	2	3	4	Total
Bulldogs	0	0	0	0	0
Glee Club	0	0	0	0	0

December 5, 1920, in Weiss Park

The following day, the Bulldogs played the non-APFA Washington Glee Club. Coming into the game, the Glee Club allowed just seven points all season. The teams tied 0–0 before a crowd of 3,000 people.

=== Game 12: at Union AA of Phoenixville ===
	1	2	3	4	Total
Bulldogs	0	7	0	0	7
AA of Phoenixville	0	7	6	0	13

December 11, 1920, at Phillies Park

In their third game in seven days, the Bulldogs played Union AA of Phoenixville, who came into the game undefeated. Before the largest recorded crowd of the season, the Bulldogs lost to Union AA 13–7. Neither team scored in the first quarter, but each scored a touchdown in the second. The Bulldogs' Calac had a six-yard rushing touchdown, and Union AA's, Hayes caught a six-yard pass from Scott for a touchdown. In the third quarter, Union AA's Hayes blocked a punt and ran it back for a touchdown, sealing the win. Despite not being part of the APFA, AA of Phoenixville after the season called themselves the "US Professional Champions".

=== Game 13: at Richmond AC ===
	1	2	3	4	Total
Bulldogs	13	0	13	13	39
Richmond AC	0	0	0	0	0

December 18, 1920, at Boulevard Field

The Bulldogs beat Richmond AC 39–0 in the final game of the season. Richmond AC was not part of the APFA, and this was the team's only game in 1920. The Bulldogs scored 13 points in the first, third, and fourth quarter to win in the shutout. Guyon scored two rushing touchdowns, while Jim Thorpe threw touchdown passes to Corcoran and Lowe. The other two touchdowns came on runs by Whelen and Grigg. Guyon made two field goals, and Thorpe added a third.

== Post-season ==
Hurt by losses to the Akron Pros and Buffalo All-Americans, the Bulldogs did not contend for the APFA trophy in 1920. Following the season, Thorpe left to start a new club composed of Native Americans in LaRue, Ohio and Cap Edwards took over as head coach. Sportswriter Bruce Copeland compiled the All-Pro list for the 1920 season, naming the Bulldogs' Wilbur Henry to the first team. Cub Buck, Harry Dadmun, and Joe Guyon were on the second team, and Pete Calac was on the third team. Three men who played for the 1920 Canton Bulldogs were later inducted into the Pro Football Hall of Fame: Thorpe and Pete Henry in 1963 and Guyon in 1966.

== Roster ==
Canton Bulldogs 1920 roster
Cub Buck (T); Pete Calac (B/E); Bunny Corcoran (E/B); Harrie Dadmun (G/E); Cap Edwards (G/T); Al Feeney (C); Johnny Gilroy (B); Tom Gormley (G/T); Larry Green (E); Tex Grigg (B)	Joe Guyon (B/E); Doc Haggerty (G); Art Haley (B); Johnny Hendren (B); Pete Henry (T); Bob Higgins (E); John Kellison (G/T); Bulger Lowe (E/T); Buck MacDonald (G); Al Maginnes (G/C)	Ike Martin (B); Ralph Meadow (E); Joe Murphy (G); Dan O'Connor (G/T); Lou Smyth (B); Dutch Speck (G/C); Jim Thorpe (B/E); Tom Whelan (E/C)
