= 1920 Decatur Staleys season =

NFL team inaugural season (later the Chicago Bears)

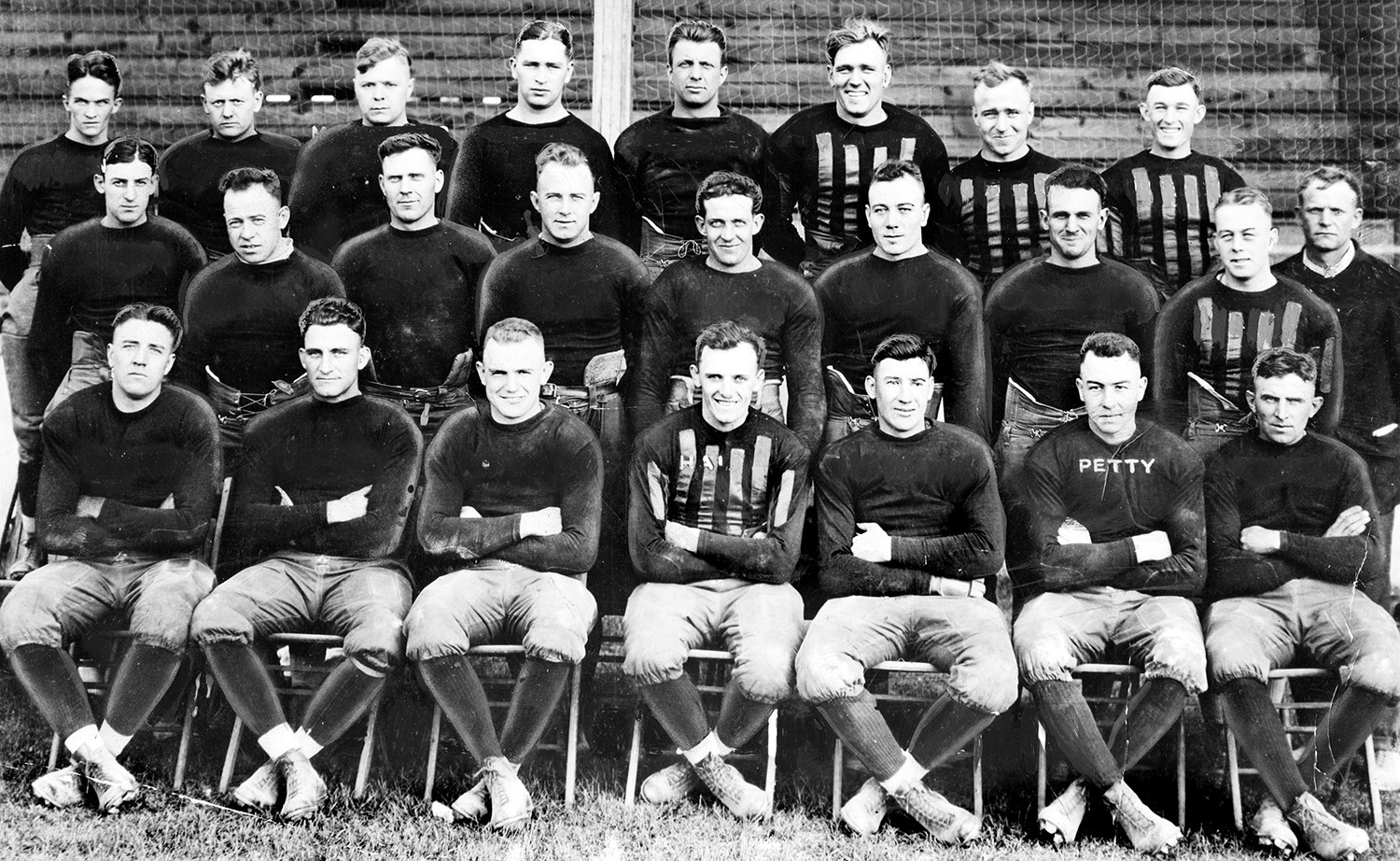
- Head coach: George Halas
- Home stadium: Staley Field

Results
- Record: 10–1–2 (overall); 5–1–2 (APFA)
- League place: 2nd APFA

The 1920 season was the Decatur Staleys′ 2nd season of existence, the first professional season of the franchise that would go on to be known as the Chicago Bears and their first under head coach George Halas, competing in the newly formed American Professional Football Association.

The team improved on their 6–1 record from 1919 to a 10–1–2 record and earning them a second-place finish in the league standings. In the last league game of the season, the Staleys needed a win versus Akron to have a chance at the title. Akron, predictably, played for a tie, achieved that, and won the first APFA title.

The stars of the Staleys were halfbacks Dutch Sternaman and Jimmy Conzelman, and end George Halas. Sternaman had a remarkable season with 11 rushing TDs, 1 receiving TDs, 4 field goals, and 3 PATs, totaling 87 points scored out of the Staleys' total of 164. Jimmy Conzelman ran for two scores and threw two more, while Halas led the team in receiving touchdowns with two.

== Background ==
The Decatur Staleys finished 6–1 in their 1919 season as an independent team. Their 1919 owner, George Chamberlain, asked George Halas to manage the team, and Halas accepted. After the 1919 season, representatives of four Ohio League teams—the Canton Bulldogs, the Cleveland Tigers, the Dayton Triangles, and the Akron Pros—called a meeting on August 20, 1920, to discuss the formation of a new league. At the meeting, they tentatively agreed on a salary cap and pledged not to sign college players or players already under contract with other teams. They also agreed on a name for the circuit: the American Professional Football Association. They then invited other professional teams to a second meeting on September 17.

At that meeting, held at Bulldogs owner Ralph Hay's Hupmobile showroom in Canton, representatives of the Rock Island Independents, the Muncie Flyers, the Decatur Staleys, the Racine Cardinals, the Massillon Tigers, the Chicago Cardinals, and the Hammond Pros agreed to join the league. Representatives of the Buffalo All-Americans and Rochester Jeffersons could not attend the meeting, but sent letters to Hay asking to be included in the league. Team representatives changed the league's name slightly to the American Professional Football Association and elected officers, installing Jim Thorpe as president. Under the new league structure, teams created their schedules dynamically as the season progressed, so there were no minimum or maximum number of games needed to be played. Also, representatives of each team voted to determine the winner of the APFA trophy.

By previous agreement, the 1920 Staleys players were paid a share of the team's gate receipts at the end of the season — about $1600 per man. For his additional duties as manager and coach, Halas was voted an extra share, a total of $2,322.77.

== Schedule ==
Game	Date	Opponent	Result	Record	Venue	Attendance	Recap	Sources
1	October 3	Moline Tractors	W 20–0	1–0	Staley Field	1,500	Recap	
—	October 10	Muncie Flyers	cancelled by Staleys due to Flyers' weakness					
2	October 10	Kewanee Walworths	W 25–7	2–0	Staley Field	1,500	Recap	
3	October 17	at Rock Island Independents	W 7–0	3–0	Douglas Park	7,000	Recap	
4	October 24	at Chicago Tigers	W 10–0	4–0	Cubs Park	5,000	Recap	
5	October 31	at Rockford A.C.	W 29–0	5–0	Kishwaukee Park	3,000	Recap	
6	November 7	at Rock Island Independents	T 0–0	5–0–1	Douglas Park	7,000+	Recap	
7	November 11	at Champaign Legion	W 20–0	6–0–1	Champaign, Illinois	500	Recap	
8	November 14	at Minneapolis Marines	W 3–0	7–0–1	Nicollet Park	"small crowd which braved the elements"	Recap	
9	November 21	Hammond Pros	W 28–7	8–0–1	Staley Field	3,000	Recap	
10	November 25	at Chicago Tigers	W 6–0	9–0–1	Cubs Park	8,000	Recap	
11	November 28	at Chicago Cardinals	L 6–7	9–1–1	Normal Park	5,000	Recap	
12	December 5	at Chicago Cardinals	W 10–0	10–1–1	Cubs Park	11,000	Recap	
13	December 12	vs. Akron Pros	T 0–0	10–1–2	Cubs Park	12,000	Recap	
—	January 15	at Chicago Logan Square A.C.	T 0–0	—	Dexter Pavilion		—	
Note: Non-APFA teams in italics. Thanksgiving Day: November 25.

== Standings ==
1920 APFA standings
	W	L	T	PCT	DIV	DPCT	PF	PA	STK
Akron Pros†	8	0	3	1.000	6–0–3	1.000	151	7	T2
Decatur Staleys	10	1	2	.909	5–1–2	.833	164	21	T1
Buffalo All-Americans	9	1	1	.900	4–1–1	.800	258	32	T1
Chicago Cardinals	6	2	2	.750	3–2–1	.600	101	29	T1
Rock Island Independents	6	2	2	.750	4–2–1	.667	201	49	W1
Dayton Triangles	5	2	2	.714	4–2–2	.667	150	54	L1
Rochester Jeffersons	6	3	2	.667	0–1–0	.000	156	57	T1
Canton Bulldogs	7	4	2	.636	4–3–1	.571	208	57	W1
Detroit Heralds	2	3	3	.400	1–3–0	.250	53	82	T2
Cleveland Tigers	2	4	2	.333	1–4–2	.200	28	46	L1
Chicago Tigers	2	5	1	.286	1–5–1	.167	49	63	W1
Hammond Pros	2	5	0	.286	0–3–0	.000	41	154	L3
Columbus Panhandles	2	6	2	.250	0–5–0	.000	41	121	W1
Muncie Flyers	0	1	0	.000	0–1–0	.000	0	45	L1

† Awarded the Brunswick-Balke Collender Cup and named APFA Champions
by vote of league owners. Staleys claimed a co-title.

== Game summaries ==
=== Game 1: vs Moline Universal Tractors ===
	1	2	3	4	Total
Universal Tractors	0	0	0	0	0
Staleys	7	7	0	6	20

October 3, 1920, at Staley Field

To start the season, the Staleys played the non-APFA team Moline Universal Tractors. A crowd estimated at 1,500 saw former Illinois star halfback Dutch Sternaman score all three touchdowns for Decatur, capped by two extra points from Hugh Blacklock. According to contemporary news reports, the margin might have been larger but the Staleys pulled their starting lineup to avoid running up the score and to conserve their stars for future encounters.

=== Game 3: at Rock Island Independents ===
	1	2	3	4	Total
Staleys	0	7	0	0	7
Independents	0	0	0	0	0

October 17, 1920, at Douglas Park

After two games against non-APFA teams, the Staleys played against the APFA Rock Island Independents in front of a record crowd. Halfback Jimmy Conzelman provided the margin for Decatur's victory on a 35-yard touchdown run through a huge hole opened up by Dutch Sternaman, fullback Charlie Lanham, and tackle Burt Ingwersen, with Hugh Blacklock tagging on the kick for point after touchdown. All eleven starters for Decatur played the game wire-to-wire.

=== Game 4: at Chicago Tigers ===
	1	2	3	4	Total
Staleys	0	7	3	0	10
Tigers	0	0	0	0	0

October 24, 1920, at Cubs Park

In a matchup regarded by some as the game of the year, the Starchworkers and approximately 200 of their faithful traveled about 180 miles to the Windy City to take on the vaunted Chicago Tigers. With Dutch Sternaman snapping off a 22-yard run, Decatur kept the ball in the Chicago end for most of the first quarter but were unable to break the scoreless tie. Then in the second quarter, with the Staleys taking over after a punt near midfield, diminutive quarterback Pard Pearce broke free around left end, scrambling 55 yards for a touchdown. Blacklock converted and Decatur led 7–0. The lead was stretched to 10 in the 3rd frame when Jimmy Conzelman nailed a dropkick snapped to him from the 22-yard line. Chicago marched down the field later in the period but were unable to put the ball across, second-and-goal from just 6 inches away, and the Staleys held on to win, 10–0.

=== Game 6: at Rock Island Independents ===
	1	2	3	4	Total
Staleys	0	0	0	0	0
Independents	0	0	0	0	0

November 7, 1920, at Douglas Park

On a five-game winning streak, the Starchworkers met the Independents again, this time with a less salutatory result — a 0–0 tie. While the eleven Staley starters played the game wire-to-wire, four Independents players were during the game. Sid Nichols, Fred Chicken, and Oke Smith injured their knees on different plays, while Harry Gunderson was hit late by George Trafton and needed thirteen stitches on his face and repair of a broken hand.

=== Game 8: at Minneapolis Marines ===
	1	2	3	4	Total
Staleys	0	0	3	0	3
Marines	0	0	0	0	0

November 14, 1920, at Nicollet Park

To conclude their six-game road game streak, the Staleys played against the Minneapolis Marines. The Marines were a non-APFA team but joined the league in 1921. The only score of the game was a 25-yard field goal from Sternaman, kicked from placement. Minneapolis tried to answer twice in the last three minutes of play, but the first field goal attempt was blocked, while a second try sailed wide of the goalposts as time expired.

=== Game 13: vs. Akron Pros ===
	1	2	3	4	Total
Pros	0	0	0	0	0
Staleys	0	0	0	0	0

December 12, 1920, at Cubs Park

The stage was set for a de facto championship game pitting the Staleys against the Akron Pros (also known as the Indians in some press accounts). Prior to the game, Halas moved their home field to the much larger Cubs Park in Chicago and hired Paddy Driscoll from the Cardinals to play on his team in order to help defeat the Pros, which was against league rules at the time. Twelve thousand fans, the largest recorded crowd of the season, showed up to watch the game, about 2,000 of whom were from Akron African-American star Fritz Pollard's hometown.

The Pros almost scored twice, but failed once because of ineligible receiver penalties. On the other side, Pollar stopped a Staleys' touchdown against Sternment in the third quarter. On the same drive, the Staleys missed a 30-yard field goal. Chamberlin attempted to injure Pollard twice in an attempt to remove him from the game. The final score ended in a 0–0 tie; however, the Chicago Defender reported that the refereeing was biased towards Decatur.

=== Post-season exhibition game: at Chicago Logan Square A.C. ===
At the start of 1921 Halas organized an indoor football game on January 15 in Chicago's Dexter Park Pavilion, a practice that was a semi-regular event among the local Chicago teams. The Bears played against a local team called Chicago Logan Square A.C. to a 0–0 tie.

The Staley monthly journal would state in the February 1921 issue that "the 'Western Champions' Played One Game of Indoor Football and Decided That Once Was Enough for Them."

== Post season ==
Since there were no playoff system in the APFA until 1932, a meeting was held to determine the champions. Each team that showed up had a vote to determine the champions. The Staleys and the All-Americans each stated they should be the champions because they had more wins and were not beaten by the Akron Pros. However, since the Akron Pros had a 1.000 winning percentage, the Pros were awarded the Brunswick-Balke Collender Cup on April 30, 1921. Seven players from the Staleys were on the 1920 All-Pro team. Guy Chamberlain, Hugh Blacklock, and George Trafton were on the first team; George Halas was on the second team; and Burt Ingwerson, Ross Petty, and Dutch Sternaman were on the third team.

== Legacy ==
Five players from the 1920 Decatur Staleys roster went on to be enshrined in the Pro Football Hall of Fame. George Halas was in the class of 1963, Jimmy Conzelman and George Trafton were in the class of 1964, while Guy Chamberlin and Paddy Driscoll were in the class of 1965.
