= Kewanee =

Kewanee may refer to:

== Places ==
- Kewanee, Illinois, the only incorporated place with the name
  - Kewanee station
  - Hotel Kewanee, a 1916 hotel, now senior housing
- Kewanee, Kentucky
- Kewanee, Mississippi
- Kewanee, Missouri

== Other ==
- USRC Kewanee, a 1863 Pawtuxet-class screw steam revenue cutter built for the United States Revenue Marine
- Kewanee Walworths, a 1919–1920 American football team

== See also ==
- Kewanna, Indiana
- Kewaunee (disambiguation)
