= Babe Hole =

American football player (1902–1963)

No. 13
- Position: Guard

Personal information
- Born: November 17, 1902; Muncie, Indiana, U.S.
- Died: March 6, 1963 (aged 60); Muncie, Indiana, U.S.

Career information
- College: None

Career history
- Congerville/Muncie/Jonesboro Flyers (1919–1925)

Career statistics
- Games played: 3
- Stats at Pro Football Reference

Ervin L. Hole, nicknamed Babe, also called Ernest Bradford Hole, Irwin or Irvin (November 17, 1902 – March 6, 1963) was an American football guard who played seven seasons with the Congerville/Muncie/Jonesboro Flyers from 1919 to 1925. He also played three games in the American Professional Football Association (APFA), now National Football League (NFL), in 1920 and 1921.

== Biography ==
Hole was born on November 17, 1902, though his date of birth is disputed by some sources. His high school is unknown. He did not attend college. In 1919, at the age of 17, Hole joined the independent Congerville Flyers. The following season he played in their one American Professional Football Association (APFA) game, a 0–45 loss against the Rock Island Independents. The team played two APFA games during the following year, and Hole started both at the guard position. He spent the following four seasons with the team, before they folded, ending his professional career. His brother, Mickey, also played for the Flyers as a fullback. During and after his career, Hole was arrested multiple times for either burglary or battery, in 1919, 1927, 1928, 1932, and 1933. Following his career he was a construction worker. He died on March 6, 1963, in his hometown of Muncie, Indiana, at the age of 60.
