= Gaulke =

Gaulke is a surname. Notable people with the surname include:

- Cheri Gaulke (born 1954), American artist
- Ellsworth K. Gaulke (1925–1993), American businessman, educator, and politician
- Hal Gaulke (1894–1971), American football player
- Maren Gaulke (born 1955), German herpetologist
