= Spencer Pope =

American football player (1893–1976)

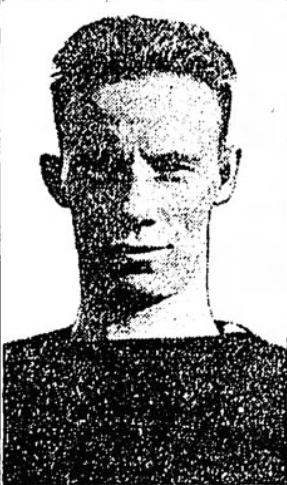

No. 4
- Position: End

Personal information
- Born: March 9, 1893; Linton, Indiana, U.S.
- Died: September 9, 1976 (aged 83); Pottsville, Pennsylvania, U.S.
- Listed height: 5 ft 10 in (1.78 m)
- Listed weight: 170 lb (77 kg)

Career information
- High school: Linton
- College: Indiana

Career history
- Muncie Flyers (1920)
- Stats at Pro Football Reference

Spencer Gorden Pope Sr. (March 9, 1893 – September 9, 1976) was an American football player and automobile dealer.

== Early years and football career ==
Pope was born in 1893 in Linton, Indiana, and attended Linton High School. He then attended Indiana University where he played college football as an end for the Hoosiers in 1915 and 1916. He also competed in hurdles and served as captain of Indiana's track team.

Pope's college education was interrupted by service in the U.S. Army during World War I in 1917 and 1918. He served in the 25th Infantry and held the rank of captain. He was stationed at Camp Shelby in Mississippi where he played for the Camp Shelby football team.

In the summer of 1919, Pope announced that he would return to Indiana University in the fall of 1919. He played for the Indiana football team in 1919. In June 1920, he received the Jacob Gimbel Prize for "superior mental attitude in athletics at Indiana university."

Pope also played one game of professional football in October 1920 as an end for the Muncie Flyers in the American Professional Football Association.

== Automotive business and family ==
After graduating from Indiana, he worked for the Marmon Motor Car Company in Indianapolis. He held positions as wholesale manager and then retail sales manager in Philadelphia. He became a distributor for the company in 1925 at Pottsville, Pennsylvania. In 1931, he received a Buick automobile franchise in Pottsville. Between 1931 and 1960, it was estimated that he had sold over 14,000 automobiles. His company was known as Pope Motor Company.

Pope married Bertha Seligman in 1924. They had a son Spencer Pope Jr. Pope died in 1976 at age 83 at Pottsville Hospital.
