= Ralph Capron =

American baseball and football player (1889–1980)

- Outfielder
- Born: June 16, 1889; Minneapolis, Minnesota, U.S.
- Died: September 19, 1980 (aged 91); Los Angeles, California, U.S.
- Batted: Left Threw: Right

MLB debut
- April 25, 1912, for the Pittsburgh Pirates

Last MLB appearance
- May 8, 1913, for the Philadelphia Phillies

MLB statistics
- Batting average: .000
- Home runs: 0
- Runs batted in: 0
- Stats at Baseball Reference

Teams
- Pittsburgh Pirates (1912); Philadelphia Phillies (1913)

Ralph Capron
Profile
- Position: Halfback

Personal information
- Born: June 16, 1889; Minneapolis, Minnesota
- Died: September 19, 1980 (aged 91); Los Angeles, California
- Listed height: 5 ft 11 in (1.80 m)
- Listed weight: 165 lb (75 kg)

Career information
- College: Minnesota

Career history
- Chicago Tigers (1920)

Awards and highlights
- Third-team All-American (1911)
- Stats at Pro Football Reference

Ralph Earl Capron (June 16, 1889 – September 19, 1980) was an American baseball and football player. He played Major League Baseball as an outfielder for the Pittsburgh Pirates in 1912 and the Philadelphia Phillies in 1913. He also played football in 1920 for the Chicago Tigers of the American Professional Football Association (later renamed the National Football League).

Capron was born in 1889 in Minneapolis. He played high school football, first at South High School in Minneapolis and later at West High.

In 1911, he played college football at the University of Minnesota.

In March 1912, Capron signed to play professional baseball with the Pittsburgh Pirates. He was assigned to the Milwaukee club where he garnered a comparison to Ty Cobb after batting .341 and stealing three bases in his first 10 professional games.

Capron died on September 19, 1980. He was interred at Forest Lawn Memorial Park (Hollywood Hills).
