= Cliff Baldwin =

American football player (1899–1979)

- Baldwin, c. 1967

No. 5
- Position: Back

Personal information
- Born: September 22, 1899; Muncie, Indiana, U.S.
- Died: January 25, 1979 (aged 79); Muncie, Indiana, U.S.
- Listed height: 5 ft 9 in (1.75 m)
- Listed weight: 170 lb (77 kg)

Career history
- Muncie Flyers (1920–1921)
- Stats at Pro Football Reference

Clifford William "Kip" Baldwin (September 22, 1899 – January 25, 1979) was an American football back who played two seasons in the American Professional Football Association (AFPA), now known as the National Football League (NFL), with the Muncie Flyers.

== Early life ==
Baldwin was born in Muncie, Indiana. His football career began no later than 1915 when he played for the Congerville Eagles. In October 1915, he was shot in the leg or heel by a police officer after jumping from a freight train while returning from a football game in Union City, Indiana. Baldwin subsequently sued the officer, claiming that he had sustained permanent injury as a result of the shooting.

== NFL career ==
Baldwin continued to play football despite his injury. When the National Football League (NFL) was formed in 1920 as the American Professional Football Association (APFA), Muncie was one of the charter members. On October 3, 1920, Baldwin played halfback for Muncie in what may have been the first game in NFL history. (Lack of records as to start times leaves ambiguity as to which of two games played on October 3, 1920, was the first NFL game.)

Baldwin played for the Muncie and Congerville Flyers during the 1920 and 1921 seasons. Baldwin, who played halfback, later recalled:

We lined up in the backfield side by side and received the ball directly from the center. . . . We didn't have separate defensive and offensive teams and most of us had to play both ways since we carried only 19 or 20 men. You had to be good at both defense and offense or you didn't make the team.

Baldwin broke his nose three times during his football career and recalled that the Flyers "were known as a rough and tough team", so much so that "some of the teams hesitated playing us."

== Later life ==
Baldwin attended Muncie Business College. He later worked at Ball Stores in Muncie. He was married to Frieda Kalk Baldwin. He died in 1978 at a Muncie hospital at age 79. He was buried at the Elm Ridge Memorial Park in Muncie.
