= Frank Rydzewski =

American football player (1892–1979)

- Rydzewski, 1915

No. 17,99
- Positions: Center, tackle, guard

Personal information
- Born: November 16, 1892; Chicago, Illinois, U.S.
- Died: October 16, 1979 (aged 87); Cook County, Illinois, U.S.
- Listed height: 6 ft 1 in (1.85 m)
- Listed weight: 220 lb (100 kg)

Career information
- College: Notre Dame

Career history
- Fort Wayne (1917); Hammond All-Stars (1919); Massillon Tigers (1919); Cleveland Tigers (1920); Chicago Tigers (1920); Hammond Pros (1920); Chicago Cardinals (1921); Hammond Pros (1922); Chicago Bears (1923); Hammond Pros (1923–1925); Milwaukee Badgers (1925); Hammond Pros (1926)

Awards and highlights
- Consensus All-American (1917)
- Stats at Pro Football Reference

Franciszek Xavier "Frank" Rydzewski Jr. (November 16, 1892 – October 16, 1979) was an American football player. He played college football for Notre Dame from 1914 and professional football in 1917 and from 1919 to 1926, including parts of six seasons for the Hammond Pros of the National Football League. He was convicted in 1927 of possession, sale and transportation of liquor and later worked as a real estate broker.

== Early years and Notre Dame ==
Rydzewski was born in 1892 in Chicago and attended St. Stainslaus School in that city. He then enrolled at Notre Dame where he played college football principally as a center, but also at tackle and end, for the Fighting Irish from 1914 to 1917. He was a leader on Notre Dame teams that finished 7–1 in 1915, 8–1 in 1916, and 6–1–1 in 1917. He earned All-American honors in 1917. At the end of Notre Dame's 1917 season, he briefly played professional football (two games) for the Fort Wayne Friars.

== World War I ==
Rydzewski enlisted in the Army ordnance department in December 1917, serving there during World War I. He began his service at Camp Grant where he won the camp's wrestling championship. He was then transferred to Montgomery, Alabama.

== Professional football ==
After the war, Rydzeski returned to professional football, playing in 1919 for the Hammond All-Stars and Massillon Tigers. In 1920, the first season of the American Professional Football Association (later renamed the National Football League), he played for three teams: Chicago Tigers (three games), Cleveland Tigers (three games), Hammond Pros (one game). In 1921, he played for the Chicago Cardinals, then returned to the Hammond Pros where he played in 1922 (six games), 1923 (six games), 1924 (four games), 1925 (one game), and 1926 (three games). He also played briefly for the Chicago Bears (one game 1923), and Milwaukee Badgers (four games in 1925).

== Prohibition conviction ==
In July 1927, Rydzewski was convicted in federal court on three counts of possession, sale and transportation of liquor. Despite testimony against him by a co-conspirator that Rydzewski was a partner in the manufacturing operation, and had paid bribes to local police, Rydzewski was not convicted on four other counts, including operation of a still in South Chicago and manufacturing liquor.

== Later life ==
Rydzewski later worked as a real estate broker in Chicago. He died in 1979 at age 87.
