= Earl Ball =

American football executive

No. None
- Position: Owner

Personal information
- Born: 1885
- Died: 1947 (aged 61–62)

Career information
- College: None

Career history

Coaching
- 1910–1915: Congerville/Muncie Flyers

manager/owner
- 1917–1921: Congerville/Muncie Flyers

Awards and highlights
- National Football League co-founder (1920)

Earl Wayne Ball (1885–1947) was a co-owner of the Muncie Flyers football team from 1917 until 1922, as well as a co-founder of the American Professional Football Association (renamed the National Football League in 1922).

== Career ==
Earl first took over as the team's manager in 1917 and lined up some former college players, including Al Feeney of Notre Dame and Dick Abrel of Purdue. However, Ball was forced to cancel the 1918 season due to World War I. In 1919, Ball and team quarterback, Cooney Checkaye reorganized the Flyers and guided them to a 4-1-1 record. The following year, Ball and Checkaye traveled to Canton, Ohio attended the organizational meeting of the American Professional Football Association located at Ralph Hay's Hupmobile dealership. The pair renamed their team, the Muncie Flyers, and the franchise became a charter member of new the league.

The Flyers lost their first scheduled league game, to the Rock Island Independents, 45–0. Because of the team's poor showing, the Decatur Staleys canceled their game against Muncie, scheduled for the following week. Ball couldn't find any other APFA teams willing to play against a struggling team. Such a match-up would not draw many fans, or gate receipts. The Flyers only other scheduled game, against the Dayton Triangles in early November, was rained out. However, the Flyers did win three non-league games before the season ended.

Muncie returned to the league in 1922. However, the Flyers lost to the Evansville Crimson Giants and the Cincinnati Celts to open the season. A scheduled game against the Green Bay Packers was also cancelled, and Checkaye and Ball folded the team and left the AFPA.
