= Wilfrid Smith =

American football player (1899–1976)

No. 16, 21
- Positions: Tackle, guard, end, center

Personal information
- Born: April 7, 1899; Milroy, Indiana, U.S.
- Died: August 3, 1976 (aged 77); Chicago, Illinois, U.S.
- Listed height: 6 ft 4 in (1.93 m)
- Listed weight: 204 lb (93 kg)

Career information
- High school: Huntington (Huntington, Indiana)
- College: DePauw

Career history
- Pine Village A.C. (1919); Hammond All-Stars (1919); Muncie Flyers (1920–1921); Louisville Brecks (1922); Hammond Pros (1923); Chicago Cardinals (1923–1925)

Awards and highlights
- NFL champion (1925)
- Stats at Pro Football Reference

Wilfrid Russell Smith (April 7, 1899 – August 3, 1976) was an American football player and sports journalist. He played professionally for six seasons in the National Football League (NFL) with the Muncie Flyers, Louisville Brecks, Hammond Pros and Chicago Cardinals. Smith played college football at DePauw University. He was a member of the Cardinals team that were NFL champions in 1925.

== Early life and college ==
Wilfrid Russell Smith was born on April 7, 1899, in Milroy, Indiana. He attended Huntington High School in Huntington, Indiana.

Smith was a two-year letterman for the DePauw Tigers from 1917 to 1918.

== Professional career ==
Smith played in two games, both starts, for Pine Village A.C. in 1919. He was also a member of the Hammond All-Stars during the 1919 season.

Smith appeared in one game for the Muncie Flyers of the American Professional Football Association (APFA) during the league's inaugural season in 1920. He started two games for Muncie in 1921.

He started one game for the Louisville Brecks of the newly renamed National Football League (NFL) during the 1922 season.

Smith played in five games, starting four, for the Hammond Pros of the NFL in 1923.

He appeared in three games, starting one, for the NFL's Chicago Cardinals in 1923. He played in six games, starting three, for the Cardinals in 1924. Smith played in all 13 games, starting five, for Chicago during the 1925 season as the team finished 11–2–1, good for first place in the NFL.

== Personal life ==
Smith joined the staff of Chicago Tribune in 1925. From 1926 to 1929, he compiled All-Pro teams for the newspaper. Smith served as sports editor for the Chicago Tribune from 1955 until 1966. He died following a long illness, on August 3, 1976, at Resurrection Hospital in Chicago.

Smith served in the United States Navy.
