= Kewaunee (disambiguation) =

Kewaunee is a city in Kewaunee County, Wisconsin, United States.

Kewaunee may also refer to:

- Kewaunee County, Wisconsin
- Kewaunee River, Wisconsin

== See also ==
- West Kewaunee, Wisconsin
- Kewanee (disambiguation)
