= Harry Curran (American football) =

American football and baseball player (1895–1968)

- Curran in 1920

No. 15
- Position: Halfback

Personal information
- Born: June 2, 1894; Marlborough, Massachusetts, U.S.
- Died: June 28, 1976 (aged 82); St. Petersburg, Florida, U.S.
- Listed height: 5 ft 10 in (1.78 m)
- Listed weight: 180 lb (82 kg)

Career information
- High school: Marlborough
- College: Massachusetts Agricultural College

Career history
- Chicago Cardinals (1920–1921)

Career NFL statistics
- Games played: 10
- Starts: 5

Harry Ambrose "Duke" Curran (June 2, 1894 – June 28, 1976) was an American football halfback who played in 1920 and 1921 for the Chicago Cardinals of the American Professional Football Association (APFA), forerunner of the National Football League.

== Biography ==
Harry Curran was born June 2, 1894, in Marlborough, Massachusetts. He attended Marlborough High School.

He entered the Massachusetts Agricultural College (MAC), today's University of Massachusetts–Amherst, in 1912, winning a spot on the Aggies' football team at the left tackle position. He was well-regarded by his peers, gaining election as team captain for 1915.

Curran graduated from MAC in 1916.

Curran was in the military during the years of World War I.

In 1920, Curran became a member of the Chicago Cardinals. He played in 9 games for the team during the 1920 season, starting in 5 at right halfback.

Curran was later the first football coach for Mt. Carmel High School in Chicago.

After his time in athletics came to an end, Curran worked as a livestock buyer for Swift and Company. Curran retired in 1968 and moved to St. Petersburg Beach, Florida.

Curran died in St. Petersburg, Florida on June 28, 1976.
