= George Knight (American football) =

American football player (1898–??)

Profile
- Position: Guard

Personal information
- Born: 1898
- Listed weight: 199 lb (90 kg)

Career information
- High school: Chicago (IL) St. Rita
- College: Loyola (Chicago)

Career history
- Chicago Cardinals (1920)

Career NFL statistics
- Games played: 2
- Stats at Pro Football Reference

George F. Knight was an American football guard who played one season for the Chicago Cardinals of the National Football League (NFL). He attended Loyola University.
