= Bill Whalen =

American football player (1895–1961)

Profile
- Position: Center / Tackle / Guard

Personal information
- Born: December 15, 1895; Penfield, Illinois, U.S.
- Died: January 28, 1961 (aged 65); Chicago, Illinois, U.S.
- Listed height: 5 ft 7 in (1.70 m)
- Listed weight: 164 lb (74 kg)

Career history
- Chicago Cardinals (1920–1924)

Career statistics
- Games played: 11
- Games started: 5
- Stats at Pro Football Reference

William Patrick Whalen (December 17, 1895 – January 28, 1961) was an American football center who played for four seasons for the Chicago Cardinals of the National Football League (NFL) from 1920 to 1924.
