= Hal Gaulke =

American football player (1894–1971)

No. 8
- Position: Back

Personal information
- Born: August 27, 1894; Columbus, Ohio, U.S.
- Died: April 30, 1971 (aged 76); Columbus, Ohio, U.S.
- Listed height: 5 ft 7 in (1.70 m)
- Listed weight: 175 lb (79 kg)

Career information
- High school: South (OH)

Career history
- Columbus Panhandles (1917, 1919–1922)

Harold Matthew Gaulke (August 27, 1894 – April 30, 1971) was an American football player. He played professional football for the Columbus Panhandles in 1917 and from 1919 to 1922. He was the Panhandles’ starting quarterback in the first official National Football League game in October 1920.

== Early life ==
Gaulke was born in 1893 in Columbus, Ohio, and attended South High School in Columbus. He was a star quarterback at South High.

== Columbus Panhandles ==
In 1917, Joseph Carr recruited two local players, including 23-year-old Hal Gaulke, to join the Panhandles. According to Carr's biographer, Gaulke "was a solid player and would play five years for the railroaders but did not have the speed of [Lee] Snoots or Emmett Ruh." Gaulke missed the 1918 season as he served in the Army from April 1918 until February 1919. He returned to the Panhandles in the fall of 1919, starting nine games at quarterback.

When the NFL was formed in 1920, the Panhandles were one of the original participants. On October 3, 1920, the Panhandles lost to the Dayton Triangles, 14–0, in the first official NFL game. Gaulke was the Panhandles' starting quarterback in the NFL's inaugural game.

Database sources indicate that Gaulke started four games during the 1920 season. However, contemporaneous newspaper accounts show that he was the starting quarterback in at least eight of the Panhandles' ten games during the 1920 season: the opener against Dayton; Akron on October 10, Fort Wayne on October 17, Detroit on October 24, in the team's sole victory over Zanesville on November 7, Buffalo on November 14; Zanesville again on November 21; and in a tie with Elyria on November 25. He also played at fullback against Cleveland on October 31.

Gaulke continued with the club in the 1921 and 1922 seasons. He started all eight games at quarterback for the 1922 team. He appeared in at least 21 NFL games.

== Later life ==
After his football career ended, Gaulke worked for the Pennsylvania Railroad in Columbus. He died in 1971 in Columbus, Ohio.
