= Zanesville Mark Grays =

Defunct American football team

General information
- Founded: 1916
- Folded: 1922
- Stadium: Mark Athletic Field
- Headquartered: Zanesville, Ohio

Team history
- Zanesville Mark Grays (1916-1922)

League / conference affiliations
- Ohio League (1916-1919), Independent (1920-1922)

The Zanesville Mark Grays were an Ohio League and Independent football team that existed for seven seasons. They played in 4 Ohio League seasons.

== Ohio League ==
Their first season was in 1916. They played two games against the same team, the "Newark Fitzsimmons". They lost both games. The next year they played two games against the Fitzsimmons, and they won both. In 1918 they did not play any games. In 1919 they played 8 games and had a 7–1 record.

== Independent ==
In 1920 they played 6 games and had a record of 3-1-2. They played two games against the Columbus Panhandles, an NFL (then known as the APFA) team. They did not play in 1921. Their last season was in 1922 where they had a 1–0 record.
