= Joe Murphy (American football) =

American football player and basketball coach (1897–1940)

Profile
- Position: Guard

Personal information
- Born: May 15, 1897; Concord, New Hampshire, U.S.
- Died: May 22, 1940 (aged 43); Manchester, New Hampshire, U.S.

Career information
- College: Dartmouth College

Career history
- Canton Bulldogs (1920); Cleveland Tigers (1921)

Joseph Thomas "Cuddy" Murphy (May 15, 1897 – May 22, 1940) was an American professional football player who was a guard for two seasons for the Canton Bulldogs and Cleveland Tigers.

Murphy served as the head basketball coach at the University of Maine from 1923 to 1925.
