= Kewanee, Kentucky =

Unincorporated community in Kentucky, United States

Kewanee
- Unincorporated community
- Location within the state of Kentucky Kewanee (the United States)
- Coordinates: 37°26′37″N 82°30′58″W
- Country: United States
- State: Kentucky
- County: Pike
- Elevation: 689 ft (210 m)
- Time zone: UTC-6 (Central (CST))
  - Summer (DST): UTC-5 (CST)
- GNIS feature ID: 508386

Kewanee is an unincorporated community and coal town in Pike County, Kentucky, United States.
