= Columbus Wagner Pirates =

Defunct American football team

General information
- Founded: 1920
- Folded: 1926
- Stadium: Neil Park (1920, 1922); Driving Field Park (1921, 1923-1925); Traveling team (1926)
- Headquartered: Columbus, Ohio

Team history
- Columbus Wagner Pirates (1920-1926)

League / conference affiliations
- Independent (1920-1926)

The Columbus Wagner Pirates were an American football team that played seven seasons; from 1920 to 1926. They played in one APFA game in 1920.

== 1920 ==
1920 was their first season. Their first game was a 36–0 win over "Williamsport". The next game of the season was a 21–0 win over Lancaster Mock's Independents. They won the next week 7–0 over "West Jefferson". In the fourth game of the season they lost their first game 6 to 7 against the Marion Questions. The game was called in the third quarter. They then had five straight wins, over the Newark Independents (7-0), "Murray City" (14-0), Wellston Eagles (7-0), Columbus West Side A.C. (13-7), and Columbus Jungle Imps (9-7). The last game was an official APFA game against the Columbus Panhandles, which they lost 0-24. Their record in their first season was 8–2.

== 1921 ==
In their second season (1921), they had a 0–4 record (excluding games 1, 4, 5, and 6 where no scores were found). Their first game was a game against the Dayton Eagles. Their second game was a 14–17 loss against "Cleveland Favorite Knits Road Team". They lost the next game 0–14 against the Akron Goodyear Silents. Their next games against the Cleveland Favorite Knits (different than the "Cleveland Favorite Knits Road Team"), Columbus West Side A.C., and Columbus Jungle Imps had unknown scores. The next game was a rematch against the "Columbus Jungle Imps", which they lost 0-26. Their final game was a 0–20 loss against the Columbus Panhandles, who they had played in the final game of the prior season.

== 1922 ==
In their third season (1922), they had a 5-2-2 record. They opened the season with wins over the Columbus Eagles, Dayton West Side Merchants, "Greenville A.C.", and Amherst Ruth Semi-Pros. The next game was a 0–6 loss in a rematch against the Dayton West Side Merchants. Next they played two games against the Columbus Doersham Lunches. Next the played against the "Columbus West Side A.C.". Their final game was a 0–13 loss against the Columbus Panhandles.

== 1923 ==
They had a 5-2-1 record in 1923. Their first three games were either losses or ties. After the first three weeks, they finished the season with 5 straight wins.

== 1924 ==
In 1924 they went undefeated, finishing with a 7-0-2 record.

== 1925 ==
Their sixth season was in 1925, they finished with a 5-3-2 record.

== 1926 ==
1926 was their final season. They finished with a 1-4-1 record. Their final game was a 0–7 loss against the Columbus Bobb Chevrolets.
