= Johnny Hendren =

American football player (1897–1964)

John Hendren
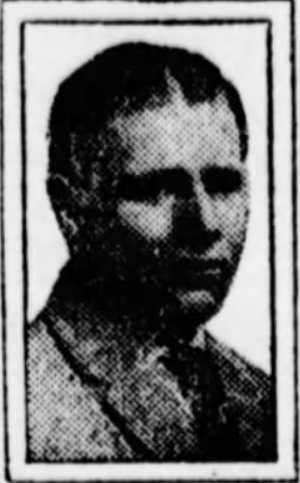

Profile
- Position: Halfback

Personal information
- Born: April 25, 1897; Philadelphia, Pennsylvania
- Died: June 3, 1964 (aged 67); Drexel Hill, Pennsylvania
- Listed height: 5 ft 10 in (1.78 m)
- Listed weight: 185 lb (84 kg)

Career information
- College: Bucknell University

Career history
- Canton Bulldogs (1920); Cleveland Indians (1921)
- Stats at Pro Football Reference

John Crowther Hendren (April 25, 1897 – June 3, 1964) was an American football player who played college football for Bucknell University and later professionally in the National Football League.

== Early life and career ==
Hendren attended Northeast High school and later played college football for Bucknell University. He was named captain of the team in 1917 but went on to serve with the Army in France during World War I where he was wounded in action. Following his return in 1919, he was once again elected the captain of the team.

He later played professionally in the National Football League (NFL) with the Canton Bulldogs in 1920 and the Cleveland Indians in 1921. Hendren scored his lone professional touchdown while playing for the latter team, during a 17–0 victory over the New York Brickley Giants.

== Later life and death ==
Hendren later worked as a salesman for the US Rubber Company. He died in 1964 at the Delaware County Memorial Hospital at the age of 67.
