= Bobby Berns =

American football player (1895–1980)

No. 8, 22, 6
- Positions: Guard, tackle

Personal information
- Born: December 10, 1895; Linton, Indiana, U.S.
- Died: July 22, 1980 (aged 84); Leesburg, Virginia, U.S.
- Listed height: 6 ft 1 in (1.85 m)
- Listed weight: 200 lb (91 kg)

Career information
- College: Purdue

Career history
- Dayton Triangles (1920, 1922–1924)

William Jennings "Bobby" Berns (December 10, 1895 – July 22, 1980) was an American football player who played professionally as a guard and tackle for the Dayton Triangles of the National Football League (NFL).
