= Walter Voigt =

American football player (1895–1937)

No. 16
- Position: Guard / Center

Personal information
- Born: July 2, 1895; Oak Park, Illinois, U.S.
- Died: June 26, 1937 (aged 41); Chicago, Illinois, U.S.
- Listed height: 5 ft 8 in (1.73 m)
- Listed weight: 200 lb (91 kg)

Career information
- College: none

Career history
- Chicago Tigers (1920); Hammond Pros (1921); Chicago Cardinals (1921)
- Stats at Pro Football Reference

Walter August Voigt (July 2, 1895 – June 26, 1937) was an American football player who played two seasons in the American Professional Football Association (APFA) for the Chicago Tigers, Hammond Pros and Chicago Cardinals.
