= Grover Malone =

American football player (1895–1950)

Profile
- Position: Back

Personal information
- Born: November 12, 1895; La Salle, Illinois, U.S.
- Died: December 11, 1950 (aged 55); South Bend, Indiana, U.S.
- Listed height: 5 ft 8 in (1.73 m)
- Listed weight: 175 lb (79 kg)

Career information
- High school: LaSalle-Peru (Illinois)
- College: Notre Dame

Career history
- Chicago Tigers (1920); Green Bay Packers (1921); Rock Island Independents (1921); Akron Pros (1923)

Career NFL statistics
- Games played: 17
- Stats at Pro Football Reference

John Grover Malone (November 12, 1895 – December 11, 1950) was a player in the National Football League.

== Biography ==
Malone was born on November 12, 1895, in Chicago, Illinois. He died on December 11, 1950, in South Bend, Indiana.

== Career ==
Malone played with the Chicago Tigers during the 1920 NFL season. He would split the following season between the Green Bay Packers and the Rock Island Independents. After a season away from the NFL, he played with the Akron Pros during the 1923 NFL season.

He coached Loyola Academy to a 7–1–1 record in 1920 and a 5–1–2 record in 1921.

He played at the collegiate level at the University of Notre Dame.
