= Tom Whelan =

American baseball player

Profile
- Positions: Center, End, Guard

Personal information
- Born: January 3, 1894; Lynn, Massachusetts, U.S.
- Died: June 26, 1957 (aged 63); Boston, Massachusetts, U.S.
- Listed height: 5 ft 10 in (1.78 m)
- Listed weight: 180 lb (82 kg)

Career information
- College: Dartmouth College, Georgetown University, Boston College, Notre Dame

Career history
- Canton Bulldogs (1920); Cleveland Tigers (1921)
- Stats at Pro Football Reference

Thomas Joseph Whelan (January 3, 1894 – June 26, 1957) was an American professional football player who spent three years in the American Professional Football Association, the forerunner to the National Football League, with the Canton Bulldogs in 1919 and 1920, winning the national championship alongside Jim Thorpe. He then played with the Cleveland Tigers in 1921. He was also a professional baseball player in the National League for the Boston Braves, at first base in 1920.

Whelan managed to attend the colleges of Dartmouth College, Georgetown University, Boston College, and Notre Dame from 1913 until 1920.

He became a coach, athletic director and principal of Lynn English High School, where the academic wing built in the 1990s was named after him. He was married to Mildred, and had five children – Thomas, Mary Jane, Mildred, Robert and William.

In the late 1930s, he umpired for several summers in the Cape Cod Baseball League, and served as umpire-in-chief in 1937 and 1938.

He assisted Lynn English High School athletes in pursuing college education. His grandchildren maintain an annual scholarship in honor of their grandparents and parents, all of whom attended Lynn English High School.
