= Joe Carey (American football) =

American football player (1895–1962)

Profile
- Positions: Guard, tackle

Personal information
- Born: November 14, 1895; Chicago, Illinois, U.S.
- Died: July 22, 1962 (aged 66)
- Listed height: 6 ft 2 in (1.88 m)
- Listed weight: 195 lb (88 kg)

Career information
- College: Illinois Tech

Career history
- Chicago Cardinals (1920); Green Bay Packers (1921)
- Stats at Pro Football Reference

Joseph H. Carey (November 14, 1895 – July 22, 1962) was a guard and tackle in the National Football League (NFL).

== Biography ==
Carey was born on November 14, 1895, in Chicago.

== Career ==
Carey played with the Chicago Cardinals during the 1920 NFL season. The following season, he played with the Green Bay Packers.

He played at the collegiate level at the Illinois Institute of Technology.
