= Cooney Checkaye =

American football player, coach, and owner (1893–1970)

Profile
- Position: Quarterback

Personal information
- Born: January 6, 1893; Muncie, Indiana, U.S.
- Died: November 18, 1970 (aged 77); Muncie, Indiana, U.S.
- Listed height: 5 ft 9 in (1.75 m)
- Listed weight: 185 lb (84 kg)

Career information
- College: None

Career history

Playing
- 1913–1915: Fort Wayne Friars
- 1916–1917: Wabash A.A.
- 1919: Pine Village A.A.
- 1920–1921: Muncie Flyers

Coaching
- 1919, 1921–1925: Muncie Flyers

owner
- 1920–1925: Muncie Flyers

Awards and highlights
- Co-founder National Football League
- Coaching profile at Pro Football Reference

Severin Joseph Checkaye (January 6, 1893 – November 18, 1970) was a professional football player, coach and owner. He was also a co-founder of the National Football League (NFL). Checkaye's franchise, the Muncie Flyers was a charter member of the league.

== Early football career ==
Checkaye began his pro football career in 1913 playing for the Fort Wayne Friars. In 1916 he played for Wabash and in 1919 for Pine Village.

== NFL career ==
The 1920 APFA season opened with two games for Sunday October 3, 1920. The games consisted of the Columbus Panhandles playing the Dayton Triangles at Dayton, while Muncie played the Rock Island Independents at Rock Island. With Dayton and Rock Island being in different time zones, as well as their being no standard kickoff times and the fact that newspaper accounts of the games did not give the kickoff times, so there is no way of knowing which game started first. This means that Cooney may have played in the very first NFL game. However, the Flyers lost their game to Independents, 45–0. It would be the team's only game played during the 1920 season. The Flyers had a tough time finding teams to play against in the league. The Staleys cancelled their game against Muncie the following week and a game to be played against Dayton was rained out.

The Flyers came back to the APFA in 1921. The team though lost league games against the Evansville Crimson Giants, and the Cincinnati Celts. They were scheduled to play again on November 13, 1921, against the Green Bay Packers, however that game was cancelled, leaving the Flyers with a 0–2 APFA record. The team then folded. Cooney cited that the salaries, transportation and operating costs were just too steep for the team's gate receipts.

The Flyers mark in APFA football was an unimpressive 0–3. But during 1920 and 1921, the Flyers posted a 4–0 mark against non-APFA teams. Including 1919, the Flyers posted an 8–1–1 record against non-APFA teams.

The team regrouped and began playing independently of the NFL, after 1922. Cooney renamed the team the Congerville Flyers. By 1925 the Flyers based their team out of neighboring Jonesboro, and was called the Jonesboro Flyers. The team played nine of eleven games in Jonesboro and finished with a 6–2–3 record before disbanding for good that year.

== Later life ==
After his NFL career ended, Cooney went to work at Republic Iron & Steel. He married Mayme McCabe in 1927.
