= Doc Haggerty =

American football player (1895–1964)

Profile
- Position: Guard

Personal information
- Born: May 9, 1895; Ohio, U.S.
- Died: July 1964; New York City, U.S.
- Listed height: 6 ft 0 in (1.83 m)
- Listed weight: 235 lb (107 kg)

Career information
- College: Tufts

Career history
- Cleveland Tigers (1920); Canton Bulldogs (1920); New York Brickley Giants (1921)

Career NFL statistics
- Games played: 7
- Stats at Pro Football Reference

John Francis "Doc" Haggerty (1895–1964) was a professional football player who spent two years of the American Professional Football Association (the forerunner to the National Football League) with the Cleveland Tigers, Canton Bulldogs, and the New York Brickley Giants. Doc played college football at Tufts University.
