= Lansing Oldsmobile =

Defunct American football team

Lansing Oldsmobiles/Lansing Durants/Lansing Durant Stars

General information
- Founded: 1919
- Folded: 1924
- Stadium: Lansing High School Field (1919), Olds Field (1920), Pettengill Stadium (1922), League Park (1923)
- Headquartered: Lansing, Michigan

Team history
- Lansing Oldsmobile/Oldsmobiles (1919–1920), Lansing Durants/Durant Stars (1922–1923)

League / conference affiliations
- Independent (1920–1926)

The Lansing Oldsmobiles, Lansing Durants and Lansing Durant Stars were the names of an American football team that played four seasons; from 1919 to 1920 and then from 1922 to 1923. They folded after 1920 but returned in 1922 as the Durants/Durant Stars. They folded for the last time after 1923.

== Lansing Oldsmobile/Oldsmobiles ==
They were founded in 1919 as the Lansing Oldsmobile/Oldsmobiles. In 1919 they had a 6–2 record. They won their first three games against the "Battle Creek A.C.", Detroit Mohawks, and Toledo Navy. Their record in 1920 was 6–1–3. They folded after 1920.

== Lansing Durants/Durant Stars ==
They came back in 1922 as the "Lansing Durants/Durant Stars". In their first season back they had a undefeated record, finishing 8–0–1. In their last season they had a 9–1 record.
