= Ken Huffine =

American football player and coach (1897–1977)

Profile
- Positions: Fullback, Head Coach

Personal information
- Born: December 22, 1897; Hammond, Indiana, U.S.
- Died: September 26, 1977 (aged 79); Bradenton, Florida, U.S.
- Listed height: 6 ft 3 in (1.91 m)
- Listed weight: 208 lb (94 kg)

Career information
- College: Purdue

Career history

Playing
- 1920: Muncie Flyers
- 1920: Fort Wayne Friars
- 1921: Chicago Staleys
- 1922–1925: Dayton Triangles

Coaching
- 1920: Muncie Flyers

Awards and highlights
- NFL champion (1921); 2nd Team All-NFL (1924)
- Coaching profile at Pro Football Reference
- Stats at Pro Football Reference

Kenneth Wilbur Huffine (December 22, 1897 – September 26, 1977) was a professional football player-coach who played in the National Football League (NFL) from 1920 until 1925. During that time, he played for the Muncie Flyers, Chicago Staleys and the Dayton Triangles. He was a member of the Staleys' 1921 Championship team. The Staleys were renamed the Chicago Bears in 1922. Ken also played with the independent Fort Wayne Friars in 1920, alongside the legendary Jim Thorpe.

Prior to playing football professionally, Ken played college football at Purdue University. He was a three-time letterman with the Boilermakers in 1916, 1917 and 1919.

== Rough first game ==
Ken also played in one of the first NFL games as Muncie played the Rock Island Independents on October 3, 1920. While serving as the team's punter, Huffine had three of his punts blocked during the game. The Independents used each blocked punt to score three touchdowns in the first quarter. Rock Island's Ed Shaw blocked Huffine's first attempt and Arnie Wyman picked it up to run 35 yards for the score. Later Huffine got off a successful punt, however the Islanders drove to the Muncie two-yard line, only to fumble. But, when Huffine went into the end zone for yet another punt attempt, Walt Buland broke through to block, and Wyman scored again by falling on the ball in the end zone. As soon as Huffine was called upon to punt again, Shaw and Oak Smith blocked another one. This time Dewey Lyle recovered but stepped out of bounds on the 15-yard line. Rube Ursella then scored for Rock Island shortly after.

== Personality and traits ==
According to Henry E. Beck's book Growin' Up With Men And Machines, Ken is described as a "soft spoken man with a hand like a catcher's mitt". He was an educated person as people like being around him. During the conversations Ken would listen to every word spoken to him.
