= Sid Bennett =

American football player (1895–1971)

Profile
- Position: Tackle

Personal information
- Born: February 2, 1895; Geneva, Illinois
- Died: December 30, 1971 (aged 76); Elgin, Illinois
- Listed height: 5 ft 10 in (1.78 m)
- Listed weight: 192 lb (87 kg)

Career information
- College: Northwestern

Career history
- Chicago Tigers (1920); Milwaukee Badgers (1922)

Career NFL statistics
- Games played: 8
- Stats at Pro Football Reference

Sydney Chisholm Bennett (February 2, 1895 – December 30, 1971) was an American football player in the National Football League. He first played with the Chicago Tigers during the 1920 NFL season. After a year away from the NFL, he played with the Milwaukee Badgers during the 1922 NFL season.
