= Mickey Hole =

American football player (1900–1969)

No. 2
- Position: Back

Personal information
- Born: September 2, 1900; Celina, Ohio, U.S.
- Died: March 11, 1969 (aged 68); Muncie, Indiana, U.S.
- Listed height: 5 ft 9 in (1.75 m)
- Listed weight: 180 lb (82 kg)

Career history
- Muncie Flyers (1920–1921)
- Stats at Pro Football Reference

Ernest Bradford "Mick" Hole (September 2, 1900 – March 11, 1969), also recorded as "Mickey Hole", was an American football back who played two seasons in the American Professional Football Association (APFA) with the Muncie Flyers.
