= Dan O'Connor (American football) =

American football player (1894–1964)

Profile
- Position: Guard / Tackle

Personal information
- Born: October 15, 1894; Manchester, New Hampshire
- Died: June 9, 1964 (aged 69); Boston, Massachusetts
- Listed height: 6 ft 2 in (1.88 m)
- Listed weight: 210 lb (95 kg)

Career information
- College: Boston College, Georgetown

Career history
- Canton Bulldogs (1920); Cleveland Indians (1921)
- Stats at Pro Football Reference

Daniel Gerald O'Connor (October 15, 1894 - June 9, 1964) was a professional football player in the National Football League with the Canton Bulldogs in 1920 and the Cleveland Indians in 1921. Before joining the NFL, Dan split his college football career between Boston College and Georgetown. He was elected the captain of the Hoya football team in 1916.
