= Dunc Annan =

American football player (1895–1981)

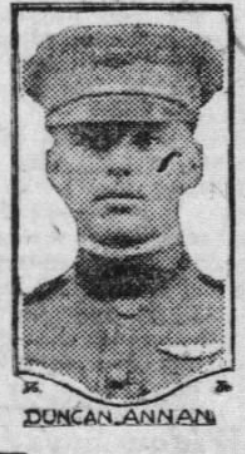
- Annan during World War I

Profile
- Position: Running back

Personal information
- Born: August 10, 1895; Chicago, Illinois, U.S.
- Died: June 21, 1981 (aged 85); Palm Beach, Florida, U.S.
- Listed height: 5 ft 10 in (1.78 m)
- Listed weight: 178 lb (81 kg)

Career information
- High school: Chicago (IL) Hyde Park
- College: Chicago

Career history
- Chicago Tigers (1920); Toledo Maroons (1922); Hammond Pros (1923–1925); Akron Pros (1925); Hammond Pros (1926); Akron Indians (1926)

Career statistics
- Games played: 43
- Games started: 32
- Touchdowns: 6
- Stats at Pro Football Reference

Duncan Colin Annan (August 10, 1895 – June 21, 1981) was an American professional football player who played running back for six seasons for the Chicago Tigers, the Toledo Maroons, the Hammond Pros, and the Akron Pros/Indians. He signed with the Toledo Maroons in September 1922. He attended Brown University, where he played as a halfback.
