= Nick McInerney =

American football player (1897–1984)

No. 11, 10, 12
- Position: Center

Personal information
- Born: April 27, 1897; Chicago, Illinois, U.S.
- Died: August 13, 1984 (aged 87); Chicago, Illinois, U.S.
- Listed height: 6 ft 2 in (1.88 m)
- Listed weight: 201 lb (91 kg)

Career information
- College: None

Career history
- Chicago Cardinals (1920–1927)

Career NFL statistics
- Games played: 74
- Stats at Pro Football Reference

Cornelius Michael "Nick" McInerney (April 27, 1897 – August 13, 1984) was an American football player who played eight seasons for the Chicago Cardinals.
