= Dick Egan (American football) =

American football player

No. 4, 7, 17
- Position: End

Personal information
- Listed weight: 175 lb (79 kg)

Career information
- High school: St. Ignatius College Prep (Chicago, Illinois)
- College: DePaul

Career history
- Chicago Cardinals (1920–1923); Kenosha Maroons (1924)

Career NFL statistics
- Games played: 23
- Stats at Pro Football Reference

Dick Egan was an American football player who as an end for five seasons with the Chicago Cardinals from 1920 to 1924 and Kenosha Maroons in the National Football League (NFL).
