= Joe Mulbarger =

American football player (1895–1951)

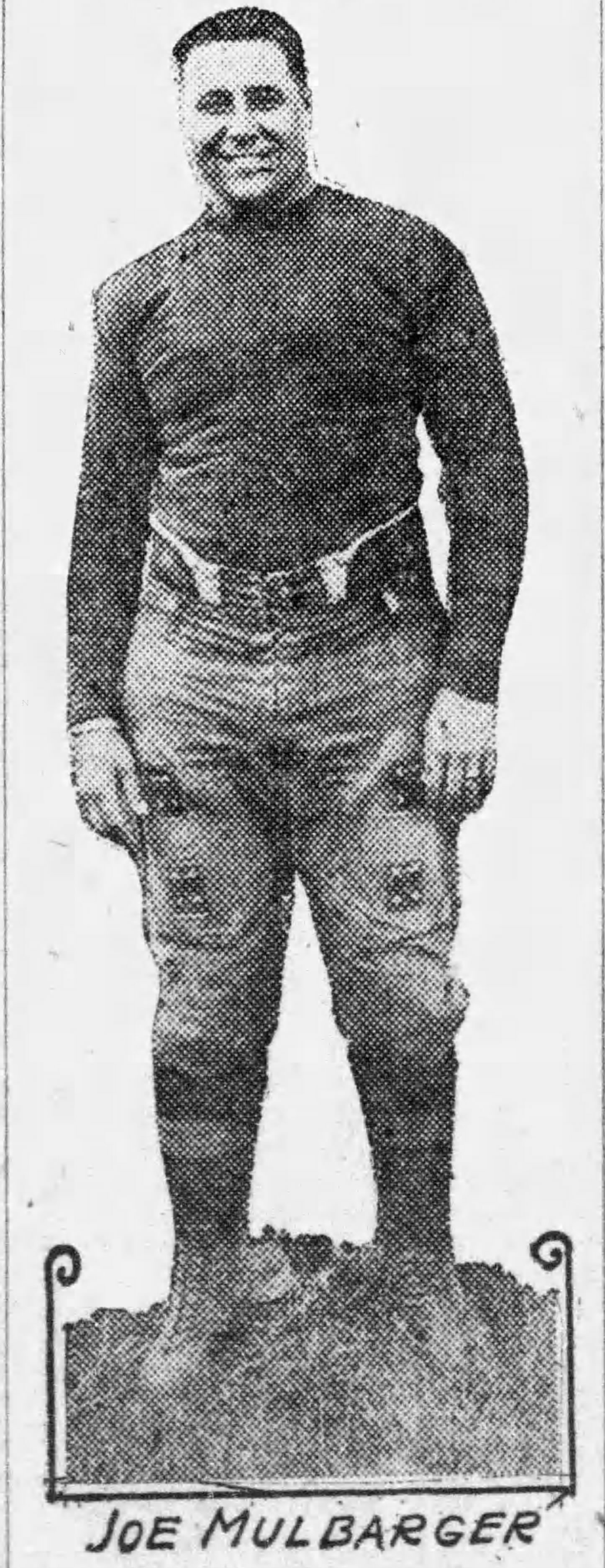
- Mulbarger in 1924

Profile
- Position: Offensive lineman

Personal information
- Born: March 2, 1895; Columbus, Ohio, U.S.
- Listed height: 5 ft 9 in (1.75 m)
- Listed weight: 221 lb (100 kg)

Career information
- High school: East High School
- College: none

Career history
- Columbus Panhandles/Tigers (1920–1926)

Career NFL statistics
- Games played: 59
- Games started: 50
- Touchdowns: 1
- Stats at Pro Football Reference

Joseph Griffin Mulbarger (March 2, 1895 – October 31, 1951) was an American professional football player who played offensive lineman for seven seasons for the Columbus Panhandles/Tigers.
