= Kewanee Walworths =

Defunct American football team

General information
- Founded: 1919
- Folded: 1920
- Stadium: Fairgrounds (Kewanee High School)
- Headquartered: Kewanee, Illinois

Personnel
- Head coach: John "Big Jack" Pollock (1919-1920)

Team history
- Kewanee Walworths/Kewanee Walworth Unions (1919-1920)

League / conference affiliations
- Independent (1919-1920)

The Kewanee Walworths were an American football team that played two seasons. They were an independent team. In 1920 they played one game against an NFL team; they played a game against the Decatur Staleys.

== 1919 ==
In 1919 they played 9 games and had a 8–1 record. Their head coach was John "Big Jack" Pollock. They played all of their games at their home stadium at Kewanee High School, Illinois. Their only loss was a game against "Moline Clubhouse".

== 1920 ==
In 1920 they had a 2-4-2 record. In their 3rd game of the season they lost 7–25 against the Decatur Staleys in an official APFA game. They were one of three teams to score points against the Staleys. The owner of the Staleys, George Halas, would later sign the player who scored the touchdown. 1920 was their last season because they did not get enough fan support to meet their financial needs.
