= Lee Snoots =

American football player (1892–1968)

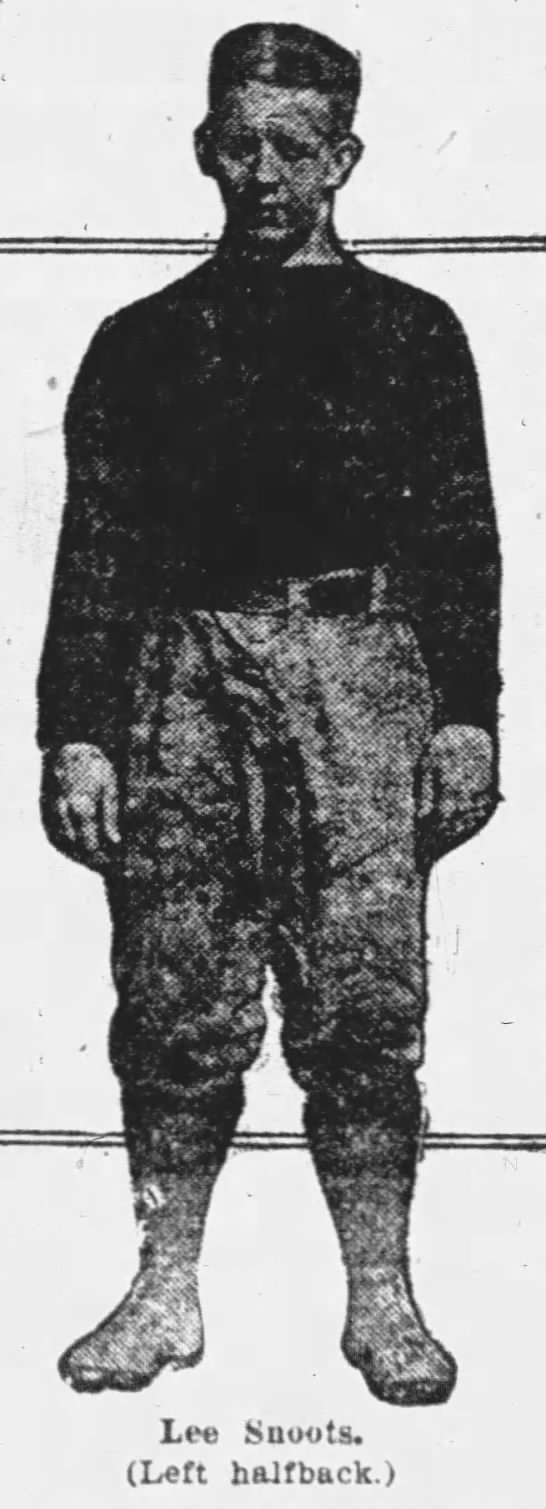
- Lee Snoots pictured in the 1910s

No. 10, 2, 71
- Position: Back

Personal information
- Born: August 12, 1892; Columbus, Ohio, U.S.
- Died: November 29, 1968 (aged 76); Columbus, Ohio, U.S.
- Listed height: 5 ft 9 in (1.75 m)
- Listed weight: 185 lb (84 kg)

Career information
- College: Marietta

Career history
- Columbus Panhandles (1914–1916, 1919–1920, 1922–1923, 1925); West Side A.C. (1924)

Career statistics
- Games Played: 21–25 (NFL), 33+ (OL)
- Stats at Pro Football Reference

John Lee "Bullet" Snoots (August 12, 1892 – November 29, 1968) was an American football back who played nine seasons professionally. He played with the Columbus Panhandles for eight seasons and the West Side A.C. for one season.

Snoots was born on August 12, 1892, in Columbus, Ohio. He went to Marietta College. Snoots became a professional football player for the Columbus Panhandles in 1914. In his second season, he played in 12 games, starting in all 12. He played 11 games (starting all 11) in 1916 before serving in World War I. He returned for a second stint in 1919 and played 10 games. In 1920, the Panhandles joined the newly formed APFA (now NFL) as Snoots played in between 3 and 7 games. He did not play in 1921 but made a return to the Panhandles in 1922 while playing in 7 games. He also scored 1 touchdown. He played in 10 games the following year while scoring 1 touchdown again. He played with the West Side A.C. in 1924. He played his fourth and final stint with the Panhandles in 1925, making one appearance. In 1931, he was a candidate for county clerk of Franklin County, Ohio. Snoots died on November 29, 1968, at the age of 76 in his hometown, Columbus, Ohio.
