= Fort Wayne Friars =

General information
- Founded: 1913; 113 years ago
- Ended: 1921; 105 years ago
- Stadium: League Park
- Headquartered: Fort Wayne, Indiana, United States
- Colors: Unknown

Personnel
- General manager: Charles Pask
- Head coach: Samuel Byroades

Team history
- Fort Wayne Friars (1909–1917, 1920–1921)

League / conference affiliations
- Independent

Championships
- League championships: 1 Indiana Champions 1916

The Fort Wayne Friars were an early professional football team based in Fort Wayne, Indiana. The team, which was also known as the Friars Athletic Association, consistently fielded good and noteworthy teams. Because Fort Wayne is situated near the Ohio border, the Friars often played Ohio teams as well as those from Indiana.

== History ==
=== Amateur origins ===
From their conception in 1909, the Friars began as a purely amateur team. However, by 1913, as was the custom in those days, Fort Wayne would on occasion employ a "ringer" or two who usually turned out to be a current star college player. Knute Rockne played for the Friars in 1913 under the alias, "Jones". By 1914, the Friars relied on graduated stars for its roster when needed.

=== Professional team ===
In 1915 Friars coach Samuel Byroades brought together a line-up that consisted of at least 5 players who had previously played for Notre Dame, 3 players from Indiana University and D.C. Smith from Purdue. The 1915 Friars went 7–1–1, losing only to the Evanston North Ends and tying the Wabash Athletic Association. The final game of the 1915 saw the Friars shut out the Columbus Panhandles, featuring six of the infamous Nesser Brothers. A year later the Friars posted an 8–1–1 record, losing again only to Wabash. That season the Friars employed 9 Notre Dame players. Knute Rockne and Gus Dorais both played for the Friars that season.

=== World War I ===
The manning shortages associated with World War I caught up with the Friars in 1917. Some players left the team for better pay elsewhere, while some played only on a week-by-week basis for the highest bidder for their services. The Friars folded and would not return to play until 1920.

=== Return and closure ===
In 1920, the Friars Athletic Association decided to file a team and recapture some of the glory of its past. The new Friars signed several players from the Fort Wayne local teams. They also as held tryouts for other players. Because of inflation, the Friars played all of their games at home in 1920. The Friars based their financial strategy on the projection that they could draw at least 2,000 fans per game by playing at home. The first game of the season resulted in a 6–0 loss to the Cincinnati Celts. During the inaugural season of the National Football League (then called the American Professional Football Association), the Friars defeated the league's Columbus Panhandles 14–0. For this game, the Friars employed Bob Peck and Ken Huffine. Then after a series of scheduling missteps, that resulted in "no shows" by their opponents, the Friars beat the Pitcairn Quakers, 7–0, on a touchdown that was set up by an interference penalty. The Friars then held another AFPA team, the Detroit Heralds, to a scoreless tie.

The 1920 season ended with an exhibition game against the Notre Dame freshman team. The game took place on a Saturday, when most Friars fans were at work. Therefore, it can be assumed that the Friars were lucky to break even for that game. The Friars lost a couple of players as a result of the previously unplayed "no show" games and later folded.
