= Muncie Flyers =

Defunct American football team

General information
- Founded: 1905
- Folded: 1925; 101 years ago
- Headquartered: Muncie, Indiana, U.S.
- Colors: Red, white

Personnel
- Owners: Congerville Athletic Club (1905–1916); Earl Ball (1917–1921); Cooney Checkaye (1919–1925)
- Head coach: Ken Huffine (1920); Cooney Checkaye (1921)

Team history
- Congerville Athletic Club (1905–1916); Congerville Thirds (1916); Congerville Flyers (1916–1920); Muncie Flyers (1920–1921); Congerville Flyers (1922–1924); Jonesboro Flyers (1925)

League / conference affiliations
- National Football League (1920)

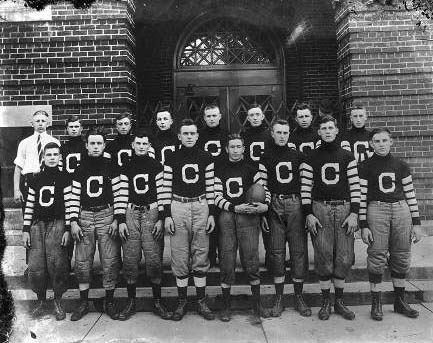
Congerville Flyers, 1915.

The Muncie Flyers, known as the Congerville Flyers for most of their existence, were a professional American football team from Muncie, Indiana, that played from 1905 to 1926. The Flyers were an independent squad for most of their existence, but are remembered mostly for their very brief stint in the American Professional Football Association (later known as the National Football League). With only three official league games, one in 1920 and two in 1921, the Flyers are the third-shortest-lived team in league history, behind the two games of the original New York Giants and the one game of the Tonawanda Kardex Lumbermen, and the shortest by a team not from the state of New York.

== History ==
=== Origins ===
The origins of the team show that it evolved from the Congerville (Muncie) Athletic Club, which dates back to at least 1905. Local newspapers provided spotty coverage of the team. An occasional reference was made to a game being scheduled and sometimes the game results with a brief game account were in the Monday paper. In 1910, the Congerville Athletic Club finished with a 10–0–1 record, outscoring their opponents 145–0. All of the home games were played against other local Muncie teams, while the road games were played in nearby Hartford City, Dunkirk, and Alexandria. In 1916, the Congerville Athletic Club team and the Congerville Flyers team merged and Muncie was represented by the Congerville Flyers.

=== The Flyers ===
The Congerville Muncie Flyers evolved from a team called the Congerville Thirds. This team was later renamed the Congerville Flyers. The 1915 edition of the Flyers proved to be a respectable team, finishing with a 5–3–3 record. Their star player was local player Cooney Checkaye. Playing all its games on the road, the 1916 Flyers had a disappointing year, finishing with a 2–6–1 record. Also representing Congerville in 1915 and 1916 was the Congerville Eagles. This lightweight team was closely associated with the Flyers, sometimes lending the heavyweight team a player or two when they were short due to injuries.

=== World War I ===
The Congerville Flyers played briefly in 1917, but they did not field a team in 1918 due to the United States involvement in World War I and the influenza epidemic. In September 1917, Earl Ball announced that he had organized a team. Scheduled to be on this team were famous college players: Dick Abrel of Purdue and Al Feeney of Notre Dame. Also scheduled to play was Christian Chambers, formerly of the Fort Wayne Friars. The team was to be led by local hero Cooney Checkaye. Ball invited ten more players to come to practice the next morning. However, a week later, on September 9, Ball announced that he had released all the players he had signed and that he would not be fielding a team due to the war. The local press was convinced that had Muncie fielded this team, it would have no doubt been strong contenders for the state championship.

=== The NFL era ===
With the war ended, football came back to life in eastern Indiana. The Flyers played some strong teams, including the Wabash Athletic Association, Fort Wayne War Vets, and Cincinnati Celts. The 1919 team finished with a 4–1–1 record. In 1920, the Flyers were one of the original 14 teams in the American Professional Football Association, which later became the National Football League. In the second ever NFL game, the Rock Island Independents destroyed the Muncie Flyers 45–0. The following week, the Decatur Staleys canceled their game with the Flyers. Muncie found it difficult to schedule another game. While the team was idle, most of its players signed to play with other local teams. The Flyers did have a game scheduled against the Dayton Triangles on November 7, 1920, but that game was rained out. The Flyers came back in late November and early December and won three non-APFA games, finishing with a 3–1–0 overall (0–1–0 APFA) record. Returning to the APFA in 1921, the Flyers opened the season by crushing the non-APFA Elwood Legion, then lost league games against the Evansville Crimson Giants, and, at home, against the Cincinnati Celts. They were scheduled to play on November 13, 1921, against the Green Bay Packers, but that game was canceled, leaving the Flyers with a 1–2–0 overall (0–2–0 APFA) record. The Flyers' mark in APFA football was an unimpressive 0–3–0. But during 1920 and 1921, the Flyers posted a 4–0–0 mark against non-APFA teams. Including 1919, the Flyers posted an 8–1–1 record against non-APFA teams.

=== Post-NFL ===
After leaving the APFA, the Muncie Flyers reverted to their original name of the Congerville Flyers. Due to weak fan support, the Flyers played almost all their games on the road from in 1922, 1923, and 1924. The Flyers did play one home game, in 1924, that was against the "Notre Dame Reserves of Brownson Hall". The Flyers lost 47–0. Some speculate that the team they played was not really reserves from Notre Dame, but the strong South Bend Arrows. During those three years, the road-bound Flyers finished with a respectable 10–8–3 record. In 1925, the Flyers could not find a home field in Muncie, so they based their team out of neighboring Jonesboro. The team was referred to as the Jonesboro Flyers and played 9 of 11 games in Jonesboro, finishing with a 6–2–3 record.

== Season-by-season ==
Year	W	L	T	Finish	Coach
1910	11	0	1		Earl Ball
1911	7	1	2		Earl Ball
1912	6	3	2		Earl Ball
1913	8	2	0	Indiana State Champs	Earl Ball
1914	5	3	1		Earl Ball
1915	8	2	1		Earl Ball
1916	2	7	1		F. W. Smith
1917	2	2	0		Ky Foster, Ralph Dawson, Zach Toliner
1918	Did not play				
1919	4	1	1		Cooney Checkaye
1920	0	1	0	14th APFA	Ken Huffine
1921	0	2	0	18th APFA	Cooney Checkaye
1922	5	1	3		Cooney Checkaye
1923	3	4	0		Cooney Checkaye
1924	3	3	0		Cooney Checkaye
1925	6	2	3		Cooney Checkaye
1926	0	1	0	Incomplete	
