= September 1920 =

Month in 1920

<<	September 1920					>>
Su	Mo	Tu	We	Th	Fr	Sa
			1	2	3	4
5	6	7	8	9	10	11
12	13	14	15	16	17	18
19	20	21	22	23	24	25
26	27	28	29	30

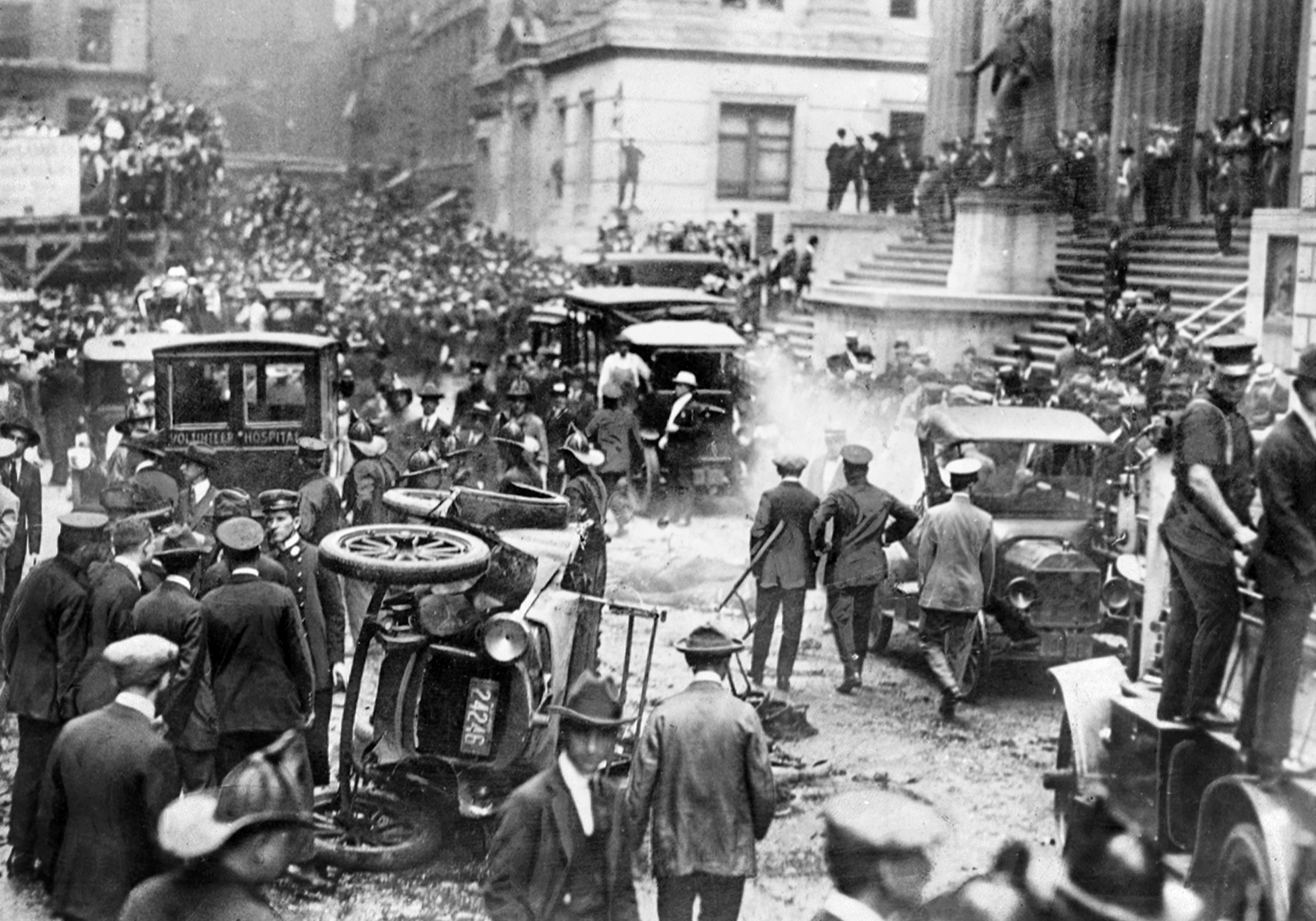
September 16, 1920: Terrorist Bomb Kills 38 on New York City's Wall Street

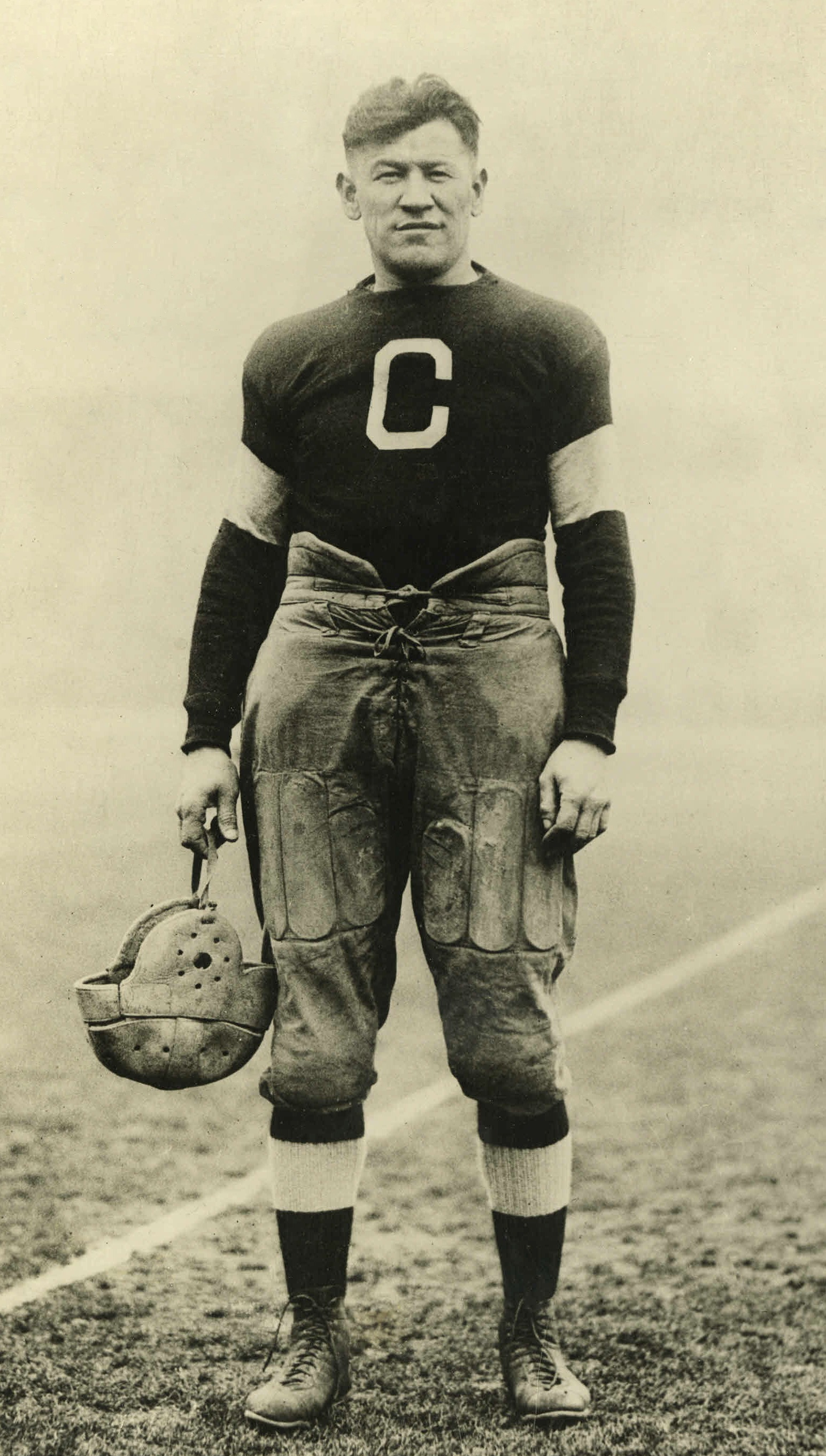
September 17, 1920: American professional football league organized with Jim Thorpe as a player and its president

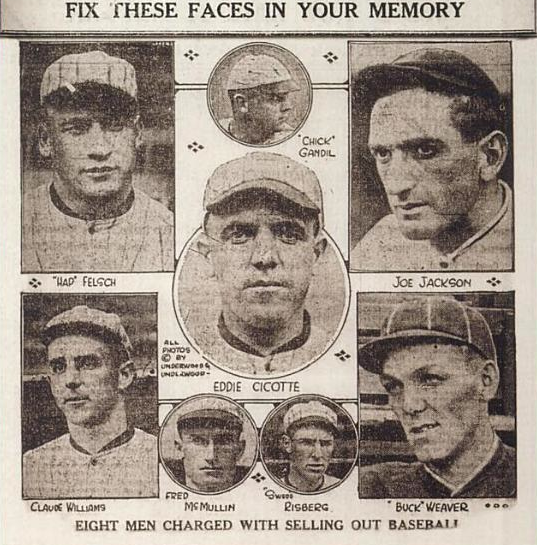
September 28, 1920: Eight Chicago White Sox players indicted on charges of deliberately losing the World Series

== September 1, 1920 (Wednesday) ==
Grand Liban flag

- The State of Great Lebanon (Grand Liban) was created by order of French Army General Henri Gourard, the High Commissioner for the League of Nations mandate for Syria and Lebanon. In making Lebanon a separate entity from Syria, France provided for a future nation for Maronite Christians, and partitioned the "Arab Kingdom of Syria" that had been proclaimed by Faysal al-Awwal to defuse the Arab nationalist movement. The territory of Grand Liban included the former Ottoman Mount Lebanon Mutasarrifate, as well as the Beirut Vilayet, Tyre, Tripoli, the Beqaa Valley and Baalbek. "However," a historian would note later, "the new Grand Liban now encompassed areas that gave Maronite Lebanon a large Muslim population, providing the basis for the inter-communal conflicts that would repeatedly ravage the country in the future."
- The U.S. government ended its six-month guarantee of U.S. railroad earnings, and the businesses resumed sole responsibility for the management of their earnings.
- Born: Richard Farnsworth, American film actor and stuntman, known for his performances in The Straight Story and The Grey Fox; in Los Angeles (committed suicide, 2000)

== September 2, 1920 (Thursday) ==
- The Indian Army Act 1911 was amended by the United Kingdom to abolish corporal punishment for soldiers in the British Indian Army. Flogging had been abolished within the British Army almost 40 years earlier with the passage of the Army Discipline and Regulation (Annual) Act 1881 (44 & 45 Vict. c. 9).

== September 3, 1920 (Friday) ==
- Plans were announced for the merger of five of the largest U.S. chemical companies to create what would become the Allied Corporation. William H. Nichols, the chairman of the Board of General Chemical Company, announced that his corporation would combine with Barrett Company, National Analine and Chemical, Solvay Process Company and the Semet-Solvay Company, with proposals to go to the boards of directors of all five companies on September 9.
- U.S. Secretary of State Bainbridge Colby hosted California Governor William Stephens to discuss that state's proposed "Anti-Japanese Land Referendum Bill" to bar citizens of Japanese descent to own land.
- All 40 of the crew of the United States submarine S-5 were saved after the sub had been unable to surface from below the waters of Cape Henelopen off of the coast of Pennsylvania. S-5 had made a dive on August 31 and then become trapped. The Panama-registered liner General W. G. Goethals was able to secure grappling hooks to prevent the sub from sinking, and pumped air into the vessel through a hole cut in its stern.
- Five days before its transcontinental air mail service was inaugurated, the United States Post Office Department lost its first two air mail employees, pilot Max Miller and mechanic Gustav Rierson, in the crash of their Junkers JL-6 near Morristown, New Jersey.
- The silent film Way Down East, directed by D. W. Griffith and starring Lillian Gish, was released by United Artists, premiering in Kingston, New York. It went on to become the highest-grossing film of the year, with $4.5 million in rentals, equivalent to almost $73,000,000 more than a century later.
- One of the first science fiction films in history, Algol, premiered in Berlin at Union Theater Kurfürstendamm. Directed by Germany's Hans Werckmeister, written by Hans Brennert and Freidel Köhne, with sets designed by Walter Reimann, Algol: Eine Tragödie der Macht (Tragedy of Power) was an 81-minute long silent film about an alien visitor to Earth from a planet in the Algol star system.
- Born: Chabuca Granda, Peruvian singer and composer; as Maria Isabel Granda Larco, in Cotabambas (d. 1983)

== September 4, 1920 (Saturday) ==
- Construction began in the Vietnamese capital of Huế for the Khai Dinh Tomb, on orders of the 35-year old Emperor of Vietnam. The expensive mausoleum would be only partially complete upon the unpopular Emperor's death five years later, and would not be finished until 1931.
- Morrison's Cafeteria, a chain of restaurants that pioneered fast cafeteria-style restaurant service for customers, opened its first location with a store at Mobile, Alabama. The chain would last until 1998, when its parent corporation was acquired by Piccadilly Cafeterias, and the remaining Morrison restaurants were rebranded with the Piccadilly name.

== September 5, 1920 (Sunday) ==
- In the first voting taken in Mexico since the overthrow of President Carranza, General Alvaro Obregon was elected president. He was inaugurated on November 30, succeeding acting President Adolfo de la Huerta.
- Eustachy Sapieha, the Foreign Minister of Poland, sent a telegram asking the Council of the League of Nations to arbitrate its border dispute with Lithuania.
- A federal raid on six houses near Springfield, Illinois, yielded the arrest of 20 members of the Communist Party of America, including five men who confessed to a plot to wreck the lead train of the Illinois Central Railroad, the Diamond Special. Justice Department agents found machinery for the counterfeiting of silver dollars and half dollars, an arsenal of 25 pounds of dynamite, seven automatic pistols, six automatic machine guns, and $10,000 worth of merchandise that had been reported stolen from businesses in Springfield.
- Romania became the 39th Member of the League of Nations, and the 26th party to approve the terms of the Treaty of Versailles.
- Died: Robert Harron, 27, American silent film actor, best known for his appearances in D. W. Griffith's The Birth of a Nation and Intolerance, died four days after accidentally shooting himself in his chest at his home.

== September 6, 1920 (Monday) ==
- The first recorded use of an acid attack in India, where it would become a commonly used act of disfigurement directed at women, happened in the Bombay Presidency when India was still under British rule. Ali Mohammed Farag threw sulfuric acid in the face of Abdullah Mohammed Jabli.
- Heavyweight boxing champion Jack Dempsey knocked out challenger Billy Miske in the third round of a bout at Benton Harbor, Michigan. The fight marked the first time a bout was broadcast over the radio and the first time that Miske had been knocked out.

== September 7, 1920 (Tuesday) ==
- An earthquake in Italy killed 171 people and injured 650, despite initial reports of a much higher death toll. The 6.5 magnitude tremor struck northern Tuscany at 7:56 in the morning local time. Three towns— Fivizzano, Villa Collemandina and Casola in Lunigiana— were destroyed. The death toll was relatively low because two foreshocks the day before had led many people to sleep outdoors. Most of those who were at work were farmers.
- U.S. President Wilson was able to walk out of the White House, without assistance, for the first time since his stroke the previous October. While a crowd watched from Pennsylvania Avenue, Wilson kept balance with a cane and "walked briskly" to a waiting automobile, then stepped in."
- British authorities released eight Irish political prisoners who had been arrested in Cork, sending them home from the military prison in Queenstown, but declined to set free any of the persons who were on a hunger strike, including Cork Mayor Terence MacSwiney.
- A. F. Whyte, member of the British House of Commons, was appointed as the first President of the Indian Legislative Assembly, a 104-member advisory body that would take office in February. The selection of Whyte was made by Lord Chelmsford, the Viceroy of British India.
- Born: Al Caiola, American guitarist and composer; in Jersey City, New Jersey (d. 2016)

== September 8, 1920 (Wednesday) ==
- Regular U.S. air mail service between the east and west coasts of the United States was inaugurated at 5:30 in the morning as a load of mail sent from New York City departed from the airfield in Maywood, New Jersey, bound for San Francisco, with stops at distribution centers in Chicago; Omaha, Nebraska; and Salt Lake City, Utah along the way. Under the schedule, "a letter leaving New York at daybreak for Omaha, Neb., will arrive the same day before sunset" and "Mail leaving New York Monday morning will arrive in San Francisco by 9 o'clock Wednesday morning." The U.S. Post Office started with a fleet of six Junkers JR-1B metal airplanes that had been modified to carry mail.

== September 9, 1920 (Thursday) ==
The flag of Carnaro

- Poet Gabriele d'Annunzio declared Fiume to be independent as the Italian Regency of Carnaro.
- The Lotta Svärd women's paramilitary auxiliary was founded in Finland.
- Soviet Russia recognized the right of independence for Latvia, ratifying the treaty signed on August 11 to end the Latvian War of Independence, including Article III of the treaty which proclaimed that "Russia recognizes without objection the independence and sovereignty of the Latvian State and forever renounces all sovereign rights held by Russia in relation to the Latvian nation and land." Latvia's Parliament had ratified the treaty (and its definition of the Latvian-Russian border) on September 2, and the ratification documents were exchanged on October 4.
- Twenty-three employees of a German artillery depot were killed in the explosion of munitions at Fort Mariensiel, near Wilhelmshaven. The blast happened during the unloading of artillery shells from munitions sheds for transport into the depot's laboratories.
- Died: Warren Delano IV, 68, American coal mine owner and uncle of vice-presidential candidate Franklin D. Roosevelt, was killed in a freak accident while riding his horse near Barrytown, New York.

== September 10, 1920 (Friday) ==
- Fifty people in Peru were killed when two barges, both carrying dynamite, collided in Callao Bay.
- The Communist Party of Turkey (Türkiye Komünist Partisi or TKP) was founded in Anatolia.
- Born:
  - Fabio Taglioni, Italian motorcycle engineer; in Lugo di Romagna (d. 2001)
  - Calyampudi Radhakrishna Rao, Indian-born American statistician and mathematician, 2002 winner of the U.S. National Medal of Science; in Hoovina Hadagali, Bombay province, British India (present-day Karnataka state) (d. 2023)
- Died: Olive Thomas, 25, American silent film actress, died of kidney failure from the accidental ingestion of mercury bichloride five days earlier.

== September 11, 1920 (Saturday) ==
- Abdulmejid II, the 52 year old heir apparent to the throne of the Ottoman Empire, was arrested and his property was confiscated after he attempted to flee to Ankara. Police in Constantinople had been searching for him since September 7. The Ottoman prince was kept under house arrest at the Dolmabahçe Palace, which was surrounded by guards to prevent him from leaving the grounds.
- Edison "Monte" Mouton became the first pilot to bring cross-country airmail in the U.S. to its destination, landing at 2:33 in the afternoon at San Francisco's Marino Field, completing the last phase of a transcontinental relay that had started on September 8.
- Strikers in southern Italy took over all but one of the factories and mills in the city of Terni.

== September 12, 1920 (Sunday) ==
- The Serbian Orthodox Church was unified and restored, 164 years after it had been abolished by the Ottoman Empire, under the leadership of Dimitrije Pavlović, the Serbian Orthodox Metropolitan of Belgrade.
- A strike by the union of film musicians— persons hired to play live music to accompany a silent film as it was being shown to a cinema audience— was settled as movie theaters agreed to demands for a 40 percent wage increase. A demand to reduce the workday from six hours to five was rejected. The Chicago Tribune commented that "The touching adagio of "Hearts and Flowers", in the more bourgeoise place, or the heart-splintering beams of Mr. Beethoven's 'Moonlight' in the emporiums which cater to the more altitudinarian foreheads, will stifle the sobs of those unduly affected by the woes of Miss Celluloid abused."
- Born:
  - Darussalam, Indonesian film actor; in Bengkulu province, Dutch East Indies (present-day Indonesia) (d. 1993)
  - Lore Lorentz, Austrian-German comedienne and cabaret artist; as Lore Schirmer, in Ostrau, Czechoslovakia (present-day Ostrava, Czech Republic) (d. 1994)

== September 13, 1920 (Monday) ==
- Belgium announced that its government had ratified its military alliance with France, ending its policy of neutrality.
- An explosion on the Japanese battle cruiser Haruna killed seven sailors and injured eight others.
- Phoenix College, one of the earliest community colleges in the United States, began its first classes, with 18 students enrolled at its campus at Taylor Street and 6th Avenue in Phoenix, Arizona. By 2020, the enrollment of the college had grown to 12,000 students and a 50-acre campus. It is not affiliated with the University of Phoenix, founded in the same city in 1976.

== September 14, 1920 (Tuesday) ==
- The United Kingdom of Great Britain and Ireland closed the Irish port of Cobh to U.S. ships, with a notice that "No ship or vessel carrying passengers eastern bound is to enter the port or harbor of Queenstown" using the name applied to Cobh before Irish independence. Two American shipping companies had been preparing to initiate service from New York on September 18.
- Connecticut voted its approval of the 19th Amendment, the first state to do so after ratification had made the question a moot point. The vote in the state senate was unanimous, and was 216 to 11 in the state house of representatives.
- Only six days after the U.S. Air Mail Service began its regular transcontinental deliveries, it suffered its second and third fatalities when one of its airplanes crashed near Pemberville, Ohio, where it had been forced to make an emergency landing after encountering engine trouble during its flight from New York to Chicago. Pilot Walter Stevens and mechanic Russell Thomas had apparently made a safe landing, but the fuel tank of the Junkers all-metal plane exploded and caught fire, killing both men. Another pilot, Max Miller, had been killed on September 3, five days before he was to begin flying.
- Filming of the silent movie Man— Woman— Marriage, directed by Allen Holubar, set a production record when work injury reports were filed by 160 film extras who had been hurt while participating in the movie's elaborate battle scene near Chatsworth, California. "One-third of the casualties were women and nine of them were hospital cases," the Los Angeles Times noted, most of them hurt while riding on horseback in "a terrific battle ... between an army of female warriors and an army of the male species." Upon the February release of the big budget ($500,000) film, critic Robert E. Sherwood would describe it as "the world's worst movie ... as crude, offensive, vulgar and dull aspectacle as we have ever witnessed on stage and screen."
- Born:
  - Lawrence Klein, American economist, 1980 Nobel Laureate for his econometrics forecasting models; in Omaha, Nebraska (d. 2013)
  - Mario Benedetti, Uruguayan journalist and novelist; in Paso de los Toros (d. 2009)
  - Cascarita, Cuban big band singer; as Orlando Guerra, in Camagüey (d. 1973)
  - Fuad Stephens, Malaysian politician, served as the 1st and 5th Chief Minister of Sabah; as Donald Aloysius Marmaduke Stephens, in Kudat, British North Borneo (present-day Malaysia) (killed in airplane crash, 1976)

== September 15, 1920 (Wednesday) ==
- In compliance with the terms of the Treaty of Versailles, the first "Disarmament Day" was carried out in Germany as citizens turned in weapons and ammunition to the victorious allies. The press reported that "There were long lines of persons waiting to dispose of their war trophies" at various government depots in Berlin. Prior to the disarmament, required under penalty of law, posters were placed across Germany with the slogan "Liefere deine Waffen aus" ("Deliver up your weapons").
- Vlastimil Tusar resigned as Prime Minister of Czechoslovakia and was succeeded the next day by Jan Černý.
- Baron Kijūrō Shidehara, Japan's Ambassador to the United States, entered into formal discussions with U.S. Secretary of State Bainbridge Colby in advance of the anti-Japanese referendum in California.
- Died: Raimundo de Madrazo y Garreta, 79, Spanish portrait painter

== September 16, 1920 (Thursday) ==
- A bomb killed 38 people in New York City, and injured over 200 others, when it exploded at the corner of Wall Street and Broad Street at 12:01 in the afternoon. The bomb had been placed inside an uncovered horse-drawn wagon that had been parked on Wall Street in front of a U.S. Treasury building and across from the J. P. Morgan building. To add to the injuries, the bomb had been packed with shrapnel in the form of cast-iron window weights.
- All five of the Socialist members who had been expelled from the New York State Assembly— Charles Solomon, Louis Waldman, August Claessens, Samuel Orr and Sam DeWitt— were re-elected in special elections across New York City.

== September 17, 1920 (Friday) ==
- At the automobile dealership of Ralph Hay of Canton, Ohio, owners of ten professional football teams voted to create the first pro football league, the American Professional Football Association (APFA). Legendary athlete Jim Thorpe was named as the president of the APFA, which would change its name to the National Football League in 1922. In its first season, the league had 14 franchises with teams in Buffalo, Chicago (the Cardinals and the Tigers), Cleveland, and Detroit, and others from Ohio (in Akron, Canton, Columbus and Dayton), Indiana (Hammond and Muncie), Illinois (Decatur and Rock Island) and New York (Rochester). The Chicago Cardinals and the Decatur Staleys continue to exist as the Arizona Cardinals and the Chicago Bears.

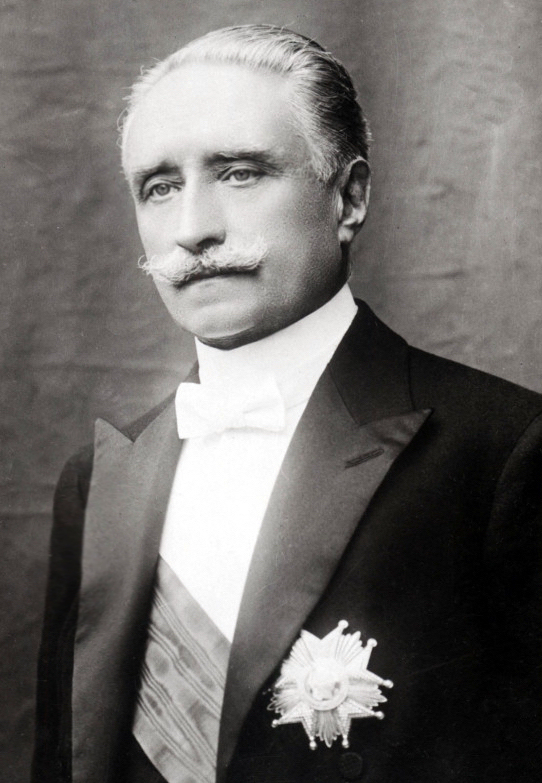
President Deschanel

- France's President Paul Deschanel resigned after seven months in office, because of the continued deterioration of his health. Prime Minister Alexandre Millerand announced that the National Assembly would be called into a three-day special session on September 21 to elect a successor.
- For the first time, the League of Nations was asked to arbitrate a conflict between two nations. Representatives of Poland and Lithuania submitted their border dispute to the League Council for arbitration.
- China announced that it was ceasing the pretense of recognizing the deposed Russian Imperial government as the representative of the Bolshevik-controlled nation, and asked Prince Nicolas Koudacheff to close the legation. Koudacheff had been appointed by Czar Nicholas II prior to being deposed in 1917.
- Campaigning in San Francisco, Democratic Party presidential candidate James M. Cox pledged, if elected, to work with California leaders to exclude Asians from settling in the state. Cox told a crowd, "if California does not desire her lands to come into the possession of Orientals, she may expect, in consonance with the Democratic principle, the genuine cooperation of the national government in the working out of a plan whereby she excludes the Oriental settler."
- The first legal professional boxing bout in New York City since 1917 was held at Madison Square Garden in front of 10,000 spectators who paid to watch four fights. In the first bout under New York's new boxing act, the Walker Law, featherweight Joe Welling won a decision over Johnny Dundee at the end of the limit of 15 rounds."

== September 18, 1920 (Saturday) ==
- Finland and Sweden agreed to refer their dispute over the Aland Islands to arbitration by the League of Nations.
- Born: Jack Warden (stage name for John Warden Lebzelter, Jr.), American film and television actor; in Newark, New Jersey (d. 2006)

== September 19, 1920 (Sunday) ==
- After four days of conferences with Italy's Prime Minister Giovanni Giolitti, factory employers and labor union representatives agreed to a plan to settle an eight-day long strike against most of Italy's factories and mills. In return, factory operators consented to allow labor union representatives to participate in management decisions in return for an end to the seizure that had started on September 11, and to grant wage increases retroactive to July 15.
- Born: Roger Angell, American essayist and sportswriter; in New York City(d. 2022)

== September 20, 1920 (Monday) ==
- The Spanish Legion (La Legión Española), a military unit of foreign-born soldiers modeled after the French Foreign Legion, was established as El Tercio de Extranjeros, the Foreigners' Regiment.
- The International Mathematical Union was founded at a meeting of the International Congress of Mathematicians in France at Strasbourg.
- What would become the first radio station in California as KNX (AM) began broadcasting in Los Angeles as electrical engineer Fred Christian began transmitting programming, with government licensing, over his 6ADZ amateur station to radio enthusiasts who had purchased equipment from his store.
- The American comic strip Winnie Winkle, which would run for almost 76 years, was introduced by the Chicago Tribune Syndicate. Written and drawn by M. M. Branner, the strip was originally titled Winnie Winkle the Breadwinner and was one of the first about a woman working for a paycheck, initially as a stenographer, later as a fashion designer. The feature would be retired on July 28, 1996; as her eulogy noted, "Winnie quickly became known for her wardrobe: She never wore the same outfit twice."

== September 21, 1920 (Tuesday) ==
- Homes and businesses in the town of Balbriggan, Ireland, owned by Irish nationalists, were burned down by police in retaliation for the murder of the Unionist head constable, Inspector Peter Burke. In the morning, British members of the police auxiliary, known as the "Black and Tans," killed two civilians, then burned down factories and stores in Balbriggan, along with 30 houses owned by nationalists.
- Three of the five Socialist Party members who had been elected to the New York State Assembly, after being expelled earlier in the year, were barred from their seats once again. Louis Waldman, August Claessens, and Charles Solomons were expelled from office by the 90 to 45 vote of the other legislators. Two others, Samuel Orr and Sam DeWitt, were sworn into office after the vote on their expulsion failed, 48 to 87. Orr and DeWitt then resigned in protest over the expulsion of their colleagues.
- Born: Kim Yong-ju, North Korean politician, younger brother of Kim Il Sung and Vice President of the Presidium of the Supreme People's Assembly since 1998; in Mangyongdae, Japanese Korea (present-day North Korea) (d. 2021)

== September 22, 1920 (Wednesday) ==
- What is now known as the "Black Sox Scandal" came to light when infielder Buck Herzog of the Chicago Cubs told a grand jury in Chicago that he had been "tipped off" by gamblers in 1919 that the Cincinnati Reds would win the first two games of that year's World Series because several Chicago White Sox had accepted money to deliberately lose the games. Affidavits from two Boston Braves players, Art Wilson and Tony Boeckel, were presented as well, as both attested that they also had heard rumors of the White Sox players' intent to "throw" the games.
- The Irish Republican Army ambushed and killed six policemen of the Royal Irish Constabulary in the largest counterattack against Unionists since the beginning of Ireland's War of Independence. The attack, carried out near the village of Rineen in County Clare, was made in retaliation for the ambush by the RIC of IRA member Martin Devitt.
- The train carrying Democratic Party presidential candidate James M. Cox derailed near Peoria, Arizona, seriously injuring the engineer and another member of the crew. Many of the passengers sustained cuts and bruises, but Cox, the Governor of Ohio, "escaped without a scratch" because his private railroad car was the only one not to run into a ditch.
- Born: William H. Riker, American political theorist, pioneer of heresthetic theory; in Des Moines, Iowa (d. 1993)

== September 23, 1920 (Thursday) ==
- The French Chamber of Deputies and the French Senate met as a combined 892-member electoral college to select a new president of France. Prime Minister Alexandre Millerand was elected president with 695 votes. Former Navy Minister Georges Leygues was elected to succeed Millerand as Prime Minister.
- The first marketing in the U.S., urging the general public to buy a radio for home use, was made by Horne's Department Store in Pittsburgh. The initial advertisement, run in local newspapers, simply noted that "a complete receiving set" was on display in the store's sporting goods section "for the accommodation of our patrons ... who haven't had an opportunity to 'listen in'" to radio, and offering "Amateur Wireless Sets, for sale here, $10.00 upwards." Six days later, Horne's ran another ad about a September 23 broadcast from the home of Westinghouse Electric Company engineer Frank Conrad over experimental station 8XK of "two orchestra numbers, a soprano solo ... and a juvenile 'talking piece'" transmitted for twenty minutes and urged buyers to get a wireless set. Although the receivers were not manufactured by Westinghouse, the advertisements are credited for inspiring the company to mass market radio sets and expand on Conrad's efforts by founding broadcasting station KDKA.
- Construction began on the Basilica of the National Shrine of the Immaculate Conception in Washington, D.C., the largest Roman Catholic church building in North America and adjacent to the Catholic University of America. James Gibbons, the Archbishop of Baltimore, gave the blessing to the granite foundation stone at a ceremony viewed by 10,000 people. The first part of the church would open in 1924, but construction would halt after 1926 because of economic difficulties. Construction would resume in 1959, but the final part of the edifice would not be completed until December 8, 2017.
- Born:
  - Mickey Rooney (stage name for Ninnian Joseph Yule, Jr., American actor and comedian, Academy Award nominee and Emmy Award winner; in Brooklyn, New York (d. 2014)
  - Alexander Arutiunian, Armenian-Soviet composer and pianist, Stalin Prize and People's Artist of the USSR award winner; in Yerevan, Democratic Republic of Armenia (d. 2012)

== September 24, 1920 (Friday) ==
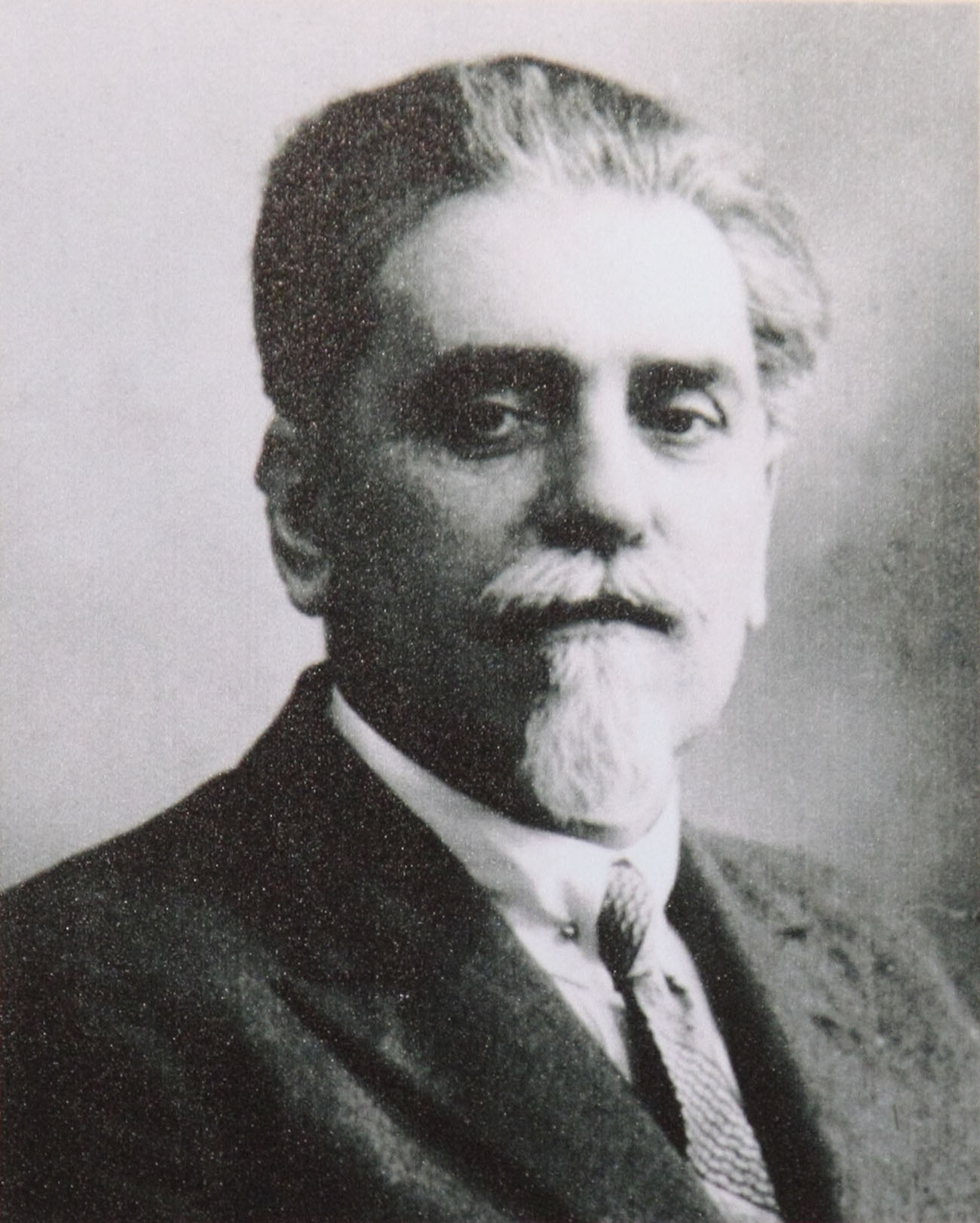
Premier Ohanjanyan

- The Turkish–Armenian War began as the new Republic of Armenia, led by Prime Minister Hamo Ohanjanyan, declared war on Turkey and invaded from the east. Badly outnumbered, the Armenians were driven back by the Turks. In less than three months, Armenia's decision to launch the war ended with its surrender in the Treaty of Alexandropol and the loss of all of the Turkish territory it had been awarded after World War One.
- With three days left before British coal miners were preparing to stop work, the planned strike was postponed from September 27 to October 4, after conferences between mine operators and union representatives on a plan to tie wages to coal production targets.
- Born:
  - Richard I. Bong, American fighter pilot, credited with downing 40 enemy airplanes in World War II, Medal of Honor recipient; in Superior, Wisconsin (killed in plane crash, 1945)
  - Ovadia Yosef, Iraqi-born Chief Rabbi of Israel from 1973 to 1983; as Abdullah Yusuf ibn-Yaqub, in Baghdad, Iraq (d. 2013)
- Died:
  - Peter Carl Fabergé, 74, Russian jeweler, creator of the Fabergé egg
  - Alexei Polivanov, 65, former Russian Minister of War and negotiator for the Soviets at the peace conference with Poland; died of typhoid fever (b. 1855)

== September 25, 1920 (Saturday) ==
- The Disabled American Veterans organization was founded at a national caucus in Cincinnati, Ohio, by Judge Robert Marx, who had been injured World War One. Initially limited to recently wounded veterans, the organization incorporated as the Disabled American Veterans of the World War.
- The Treaty of al-Sib was signed by Sultan Taimur bin Feisal of Muscat, and the Imam Mohammed bin Abdullah al-Khalili of Oman.
- In a referendum, members of Italy's Metallurgical Workers Union approved the settlement hammered out by Prime Minister Giolitti, by a margin of 132,000 to 45,000.
- Prime Minister Georges Leygues of France won his first vote of confidence in the Chamber of Deputies, after outlining a program to strictly hold Germany to the provisions of the Treaty of Versailles. The endorsement was 507 to 80 in his favor.
- United Kingdom Prime Minister David Lloyd George announced that his government would conduct a public investigation of the burning of the Irish town of Balbriggan.
- Died: Jacob Schiff, 73, German-born American philanthropist and railway financier

== September 26, 1920 (Sunday) ==
- The first place Brooklyn Robins, not yet called the Brooklyn Dodgers and still called the "Superbas" in the Brooklyn press, defeated the second-place New York Giants, 4 to 2, to capture the National League pennant. The win raised Brooklyn's record to 90 wins and 60 losses with four games to play, and dropped the Giants to 84 and 64 with six games left. At that point, the only hope that the Giants had would have required Brooklyn to lose all their remaining games, and the Giants to win all six of theirs. The Giants lost the second game of a doubleheader the next day.
- The first football game involving an NFL team was played in Rock Island, Illinois, nine days after the founding of the APFA, as the Rock Island Independents defeated the St. Paul (MN) Ideals, 48 to 0, at Douglas Park. The game was counted in the APFA standings for 1920 as part of two wins in the Independents' 6-2-2 record. One week later, on October 3, Rock Island would play one of the two games between APFA opponents that opened the APFA's inaugural season.
- Born: Barbara Britton, American actress, star of The Bandit Queen (1950) and The Fabulous Suzanne (1946), leading lady in multiple Westerns, and for her role in the radio and television mystery series Mr. and Mrs. North; as Barbara Brantingham, in Long Beach, California (d. 1980)Saxon, Wolfgang (January 19, 1980). "Barbara Britton, Film Actress, 59; Was TV Revlon Girl Began in a Western". The New York Times. p. 28.

== September 27, 1920 (Monday) ==
- New York became the first U.S. state to enact comprehensive reforms in housing, with five measures approved to relieve the housing shortage, and two other bills to protect tenants from unreasonable landlord practices. Signed into law by Governor Alfred E. Smith, the new law effectively abolished the traditional October 1 "Moving Day which had prevailed in New York City for decades, when almost all home rental leases expired. Arthur J. W. Hilly, the chairman of the Mayor's Committee on Housing, told reporters, "There will be no moving day until November 22, unless, of course, tenants desire to move. The new laws will keep the tenants in their present homes. The 100,000 eviction notices sent out have been wiped out as if they ever existed, and therefore city marshals who have been reaping a harvest from eviction cases suddenly find themselves deprived of their lucrative gold mine."
- Republican presidential candidate Warren G. Harding began nationwide campaigning after three months of press releases from his home in Marion, Ohio, beginning with a speech in Baltimore.
- The day before they were indicted on charges of deliberately losing the 1919 World Series, left fielder "Shoeless Joe Jackson", shortstop Charles Risberg, and third baseman Buck Weaver of the Chicago White Sox appeared in their final game, a 2 to 0 win over the Detroit Tigers. At the time, the White Sox were in second place in the American League behind the Cleveland Indians with three games left to play.
- The "Raggedy Andy" doll (and the Raggedy Andy Stories book that accompanied the purchase) first went on sale, two years after Johnny Gruelle first marketed the successful "Raggedy Ann" doll. Billed as the "brother to Raggedy Ann, first in affections of all little girls and very small boys," the seller noted that "Raggedy Andy has all the charm of his sister, personally and as hero of the new book by that name."
- Born: William Conrad (stage name for John William Cann, Jr.), American actor, known for the Gunsmoke radio series and for the TV shows Cannon and Jake and the Fatman; in Louisville, Kentucky (d. 1994)

== September 28, 1920 (Tuesday) ==
- Eight players for the Chicago White Sox were indicted in Chicago for conspiring to lose the 1919 World Series in return for bribe payments by gamblers. Pitcher Eddie Cicotte and outfielder Joe Jackson admitted that they had accepted bribes of $10,000 and $5,000 each from the agent of a gambling syndicate. The other six were utility man Fred McMullin, centerfielder Oscar Felsch, shortstop Charles Risberg, pitcher Claude Williams, third baseman Buck Weaver and former first baseman Chick Gandil, who had quit before the start of the season. White Sox owner Charles Comiskey immediately suspended the seven active White Sox players named in the indictment.

== September 29, 1920 (Wednesday) ==
- The train car carrying Warren G. Harding, the Republican nominee for president, ran off the rails while crossing an 80 feet (24 m) high bridge near Millwood, West Virginia. A railroad policeman was able to engage the emergency brake on the rear platform to halt the train, at which time it was discovered that the future U.S. President's car had traveled for 990 feet along the railroad ties rather than on the rails. "A few feet more of that rocking," a Chicago Tribune reporter on the train noted, "and the car would have toppled over into the gulch." Harding had just completed a speech at the town of Sistersville and was on the way westward toward Kentucky when the accident happened at 11:20 in the morning.
- Germany began broadcasting from the largest wireless radio transmitter in the world, a set of telegraph towers and antennae at Nauen with "a sending radius of 12,000 miles (19,000 km) and a capacity of seventy-five words a minute" of Morse code transmission.
- Born: Peter D. Mitchell, British biochemist, 1978 Nobel Prize for Chemistry laureate; in Mitcham, London (d. 1992)

== September 30, 1920 (Thursday) ==
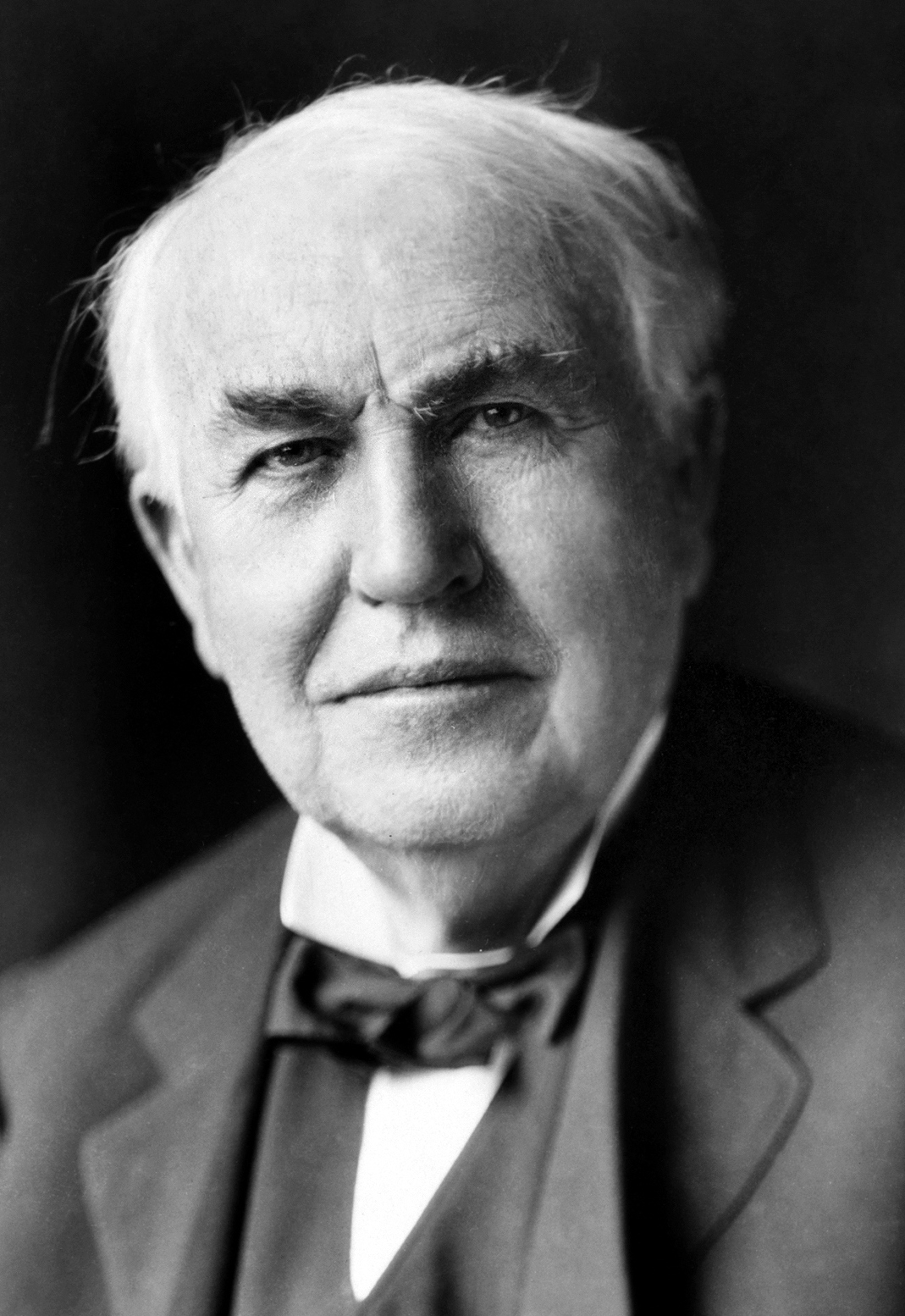
Edison

- Prolific American inventor Thomas A. Edison revealed in an article in American Magazine that he was working on a device to communicate with the dead. Edison was quoted as telling reporter B. C. Forbes as saying, "I am proceeding on the theory that, in the very nature of things, the degree of material or physical power possessed by those in the next life must be extremely slight and that, therefore, any instrument designed to communicate with us must be superdelicate— as fine and responsive as human ingenuity can make it. For my part, I am inclined to believe that our personality hereafter will be able to affect matter."
- General Pyotr Wrangel of the White Russians captured Kharkov from the Soviet army.
- Died: William Wilfred Sullivan, 80, Canadian politician, Premier of Prince Edward Island from 1879 to 1889, and later the province's Chief Justice from 1889 to 1917
