= August 1920 =

Month in 1920

<<	August 1920					>>
Su	Mo	Tu	We	Th	Fr	Sa
1	2	3	4	5	6	7
8	9	10	11	12	13	14
15	16	17	18	19	20	21
22	23	24	25	26	27	28
29	30	31

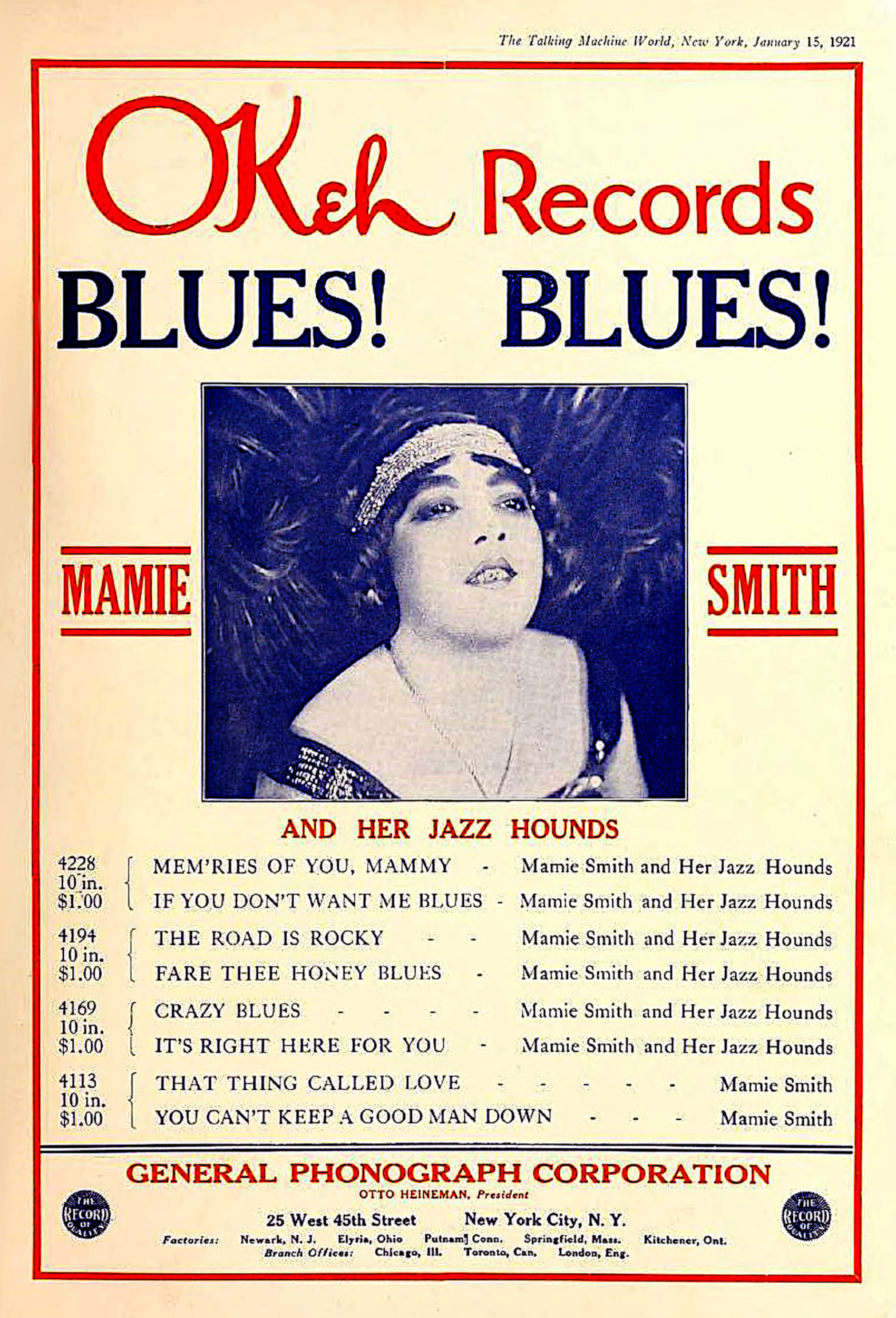
August 10, 1920: Release of Mamie Smith's record "Crazy Blues" opens the "Jazz Age"

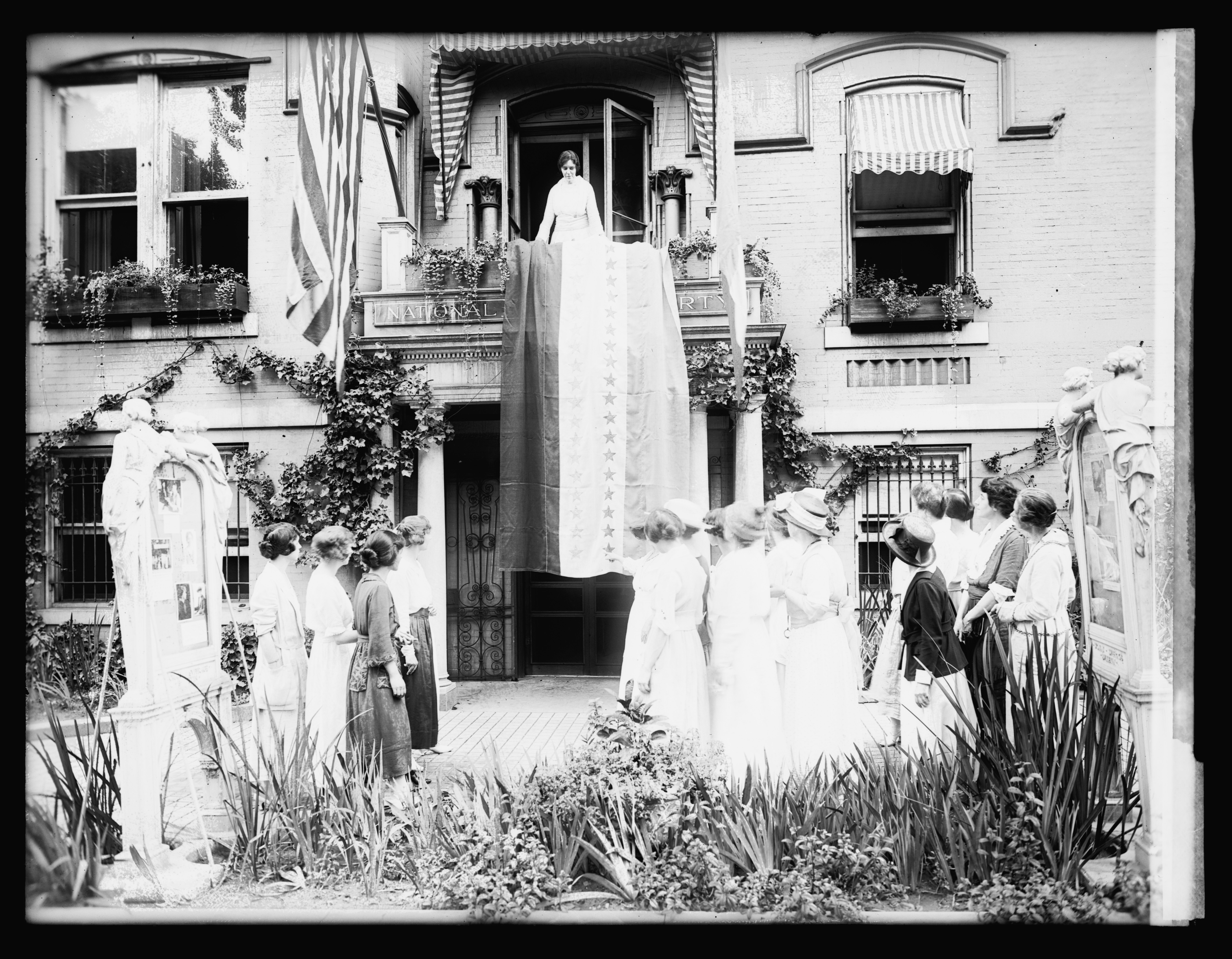
August 26, 1920: National Women's Party leader Alice Paul marks proclamation of the 19th Amendment

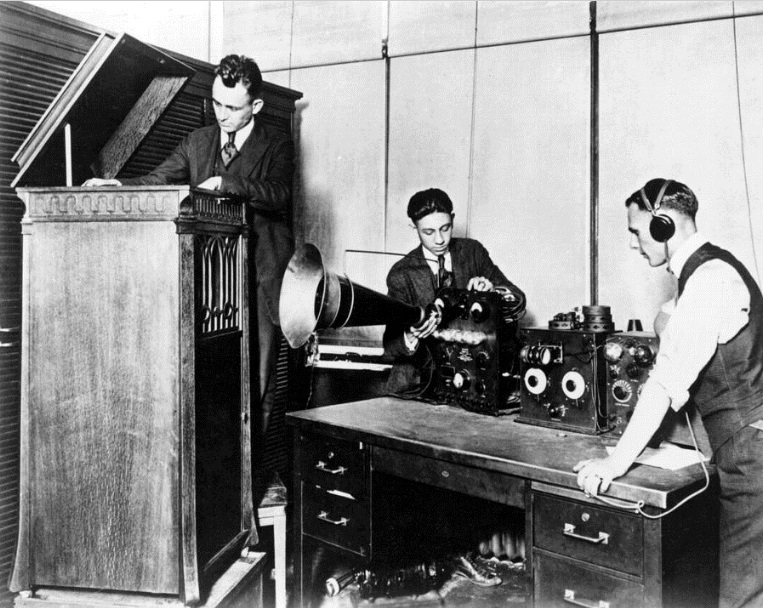
August 20, 1920: 8MK, the first U.S. radio station, goes on the air

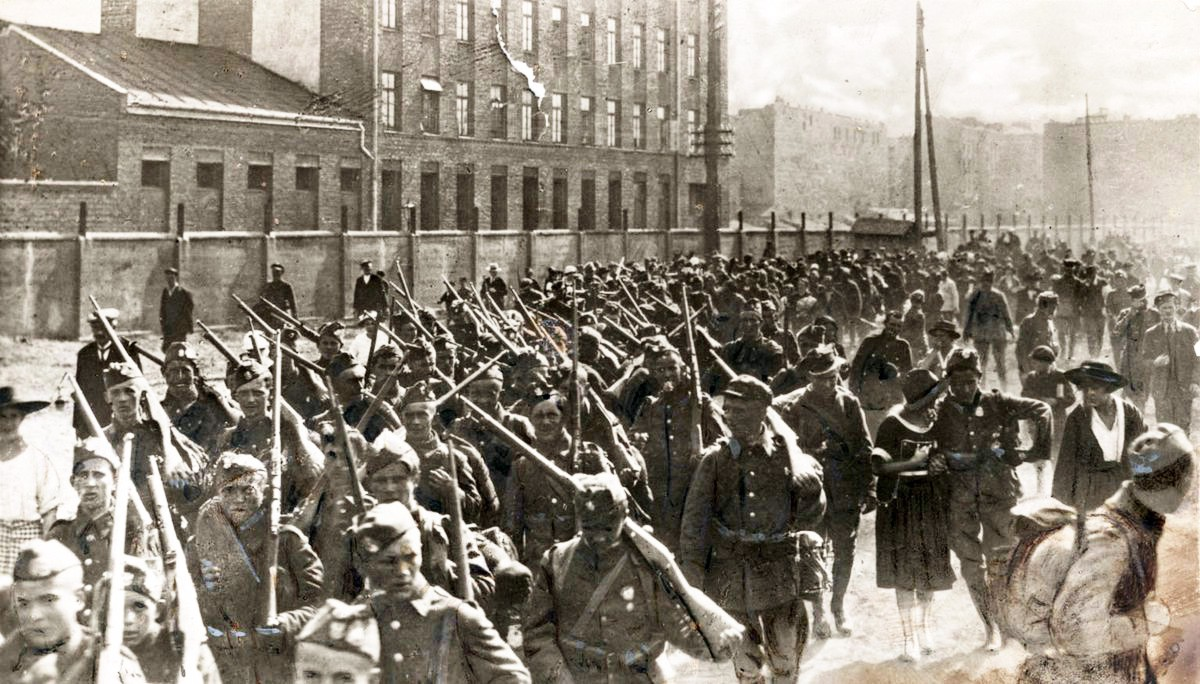
August 15, 1920: Poland's Army turns back the Soviet Russian invasion

== August 1, 1920 (Sunday) ==
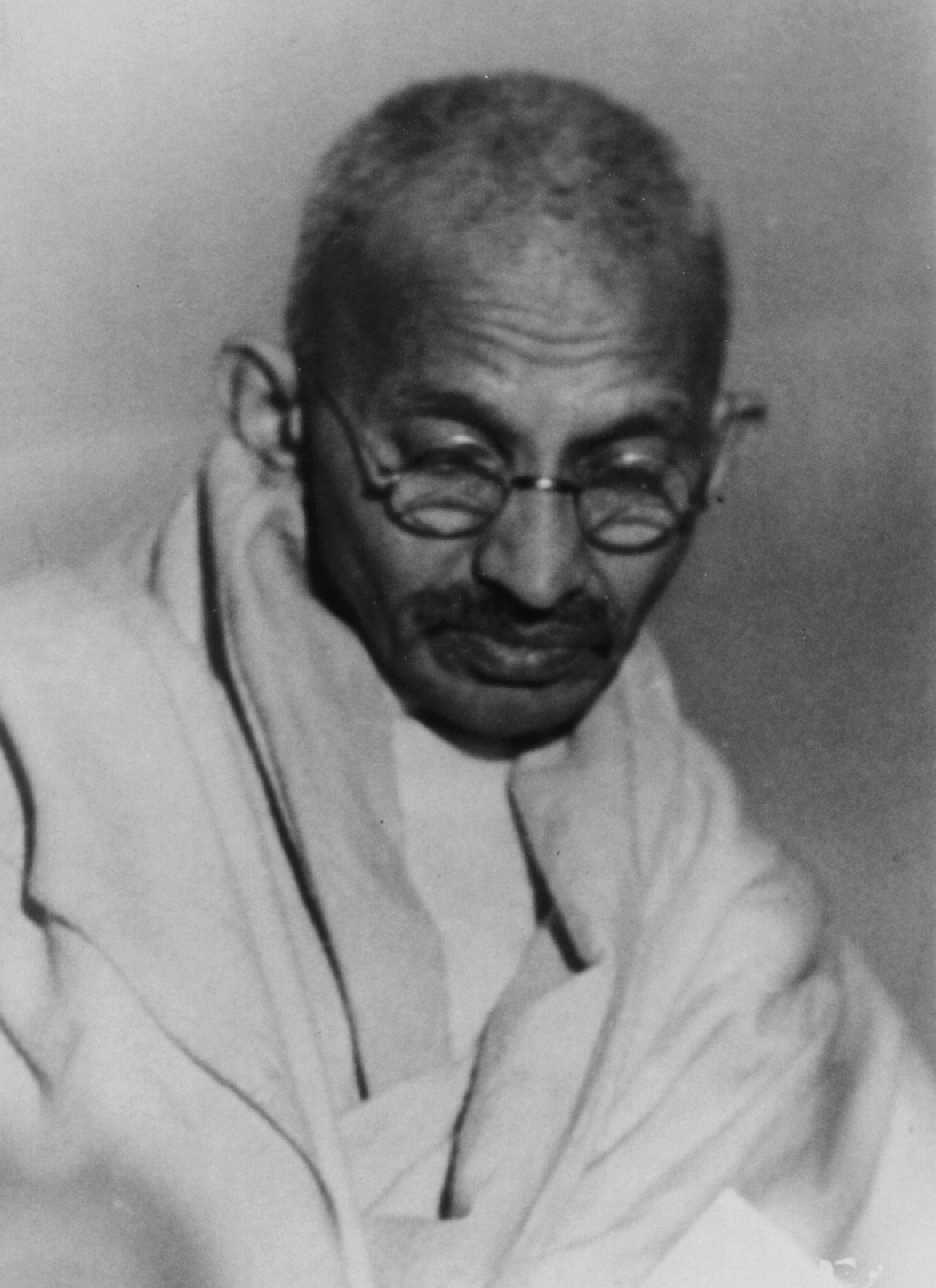
Gandhi

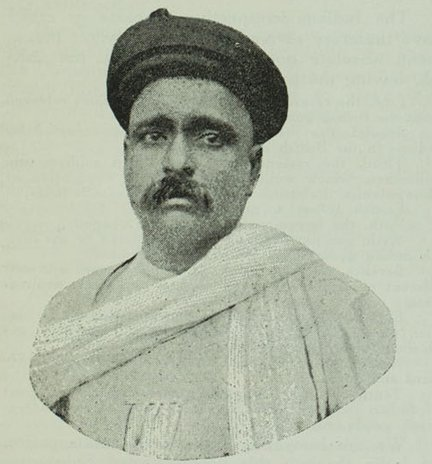
Tilak

- In British India, independence activist Mohandas K. Gandhi began the first of four stages of his non-cooperation movement with the British colonial government, as an extension of his Satyagraha (passive resistance) movement, by "giving up all titles and honors conferred by the Crown" because Britain had failed to modify terms its policies regarding its Asian colonies. Gandhi began by returning the medals granted him by the Crown. Each stage was to be more severe, starting with resignation of Indian Muslims and Hindus from government jobs, then the resignation of officers and soldiers from the British Army, and finally, the refusal to pay taxes. Gandhi had announced the August 1 deadline in late June.
- The Civil Service Retirement Act, establishing a retirement system for United States government employees, went into effect.
- Radium treatment, at no cost, for victims of cancer was announced by New York's State Institute for the Study of Malignant Disease, with treatments to begin at the research clinic of the American Association for Cancer Research in Buffalo, New York, on October 15. The state had recently purchased 2.25 grams of radium for $225,000 for human research. Although isotopes of radium (such as radium-223) are still used in for certain cancers in radiation therapy, the effects of long-term radiation exposure on technicians and patients had not yet been studied.
- Born:
  - Thomas McGuire, U.S. Army Air Forces ace fighter pilot with 38 kills, posthumous recipient of the Medal of Honor; in Ridgewood, New Jersey (d. 1945, killed in action)
  - Sammy Lee, American physician and diver, two time Olympic gold medalist in diving; in Fresno, California (d. 2016)
  - Ken Bald, American comic book and comic strip artist, known for the "Dr. Kildare" daily strip; in New York City (d. 2019)
- Died:
  - Bal Gangadhar Tilak, 64, Indian nationalist and independence activist, first leader of the Indian Independence Movement, called "the Maker of Modern India" by Mahatma Gandhi (b. 1856)
  - Frank Hanly, 57, American politician and anti-alcohol crusader; killed in an automobile-train accident near Dennison, Ohio. Hanly was a passenger in a car that was crossing a double railroad track when the vehicle was driven "back of one freight train and directly in front of another." (b. 1863)

== August 2, 1920 (Monday) ==
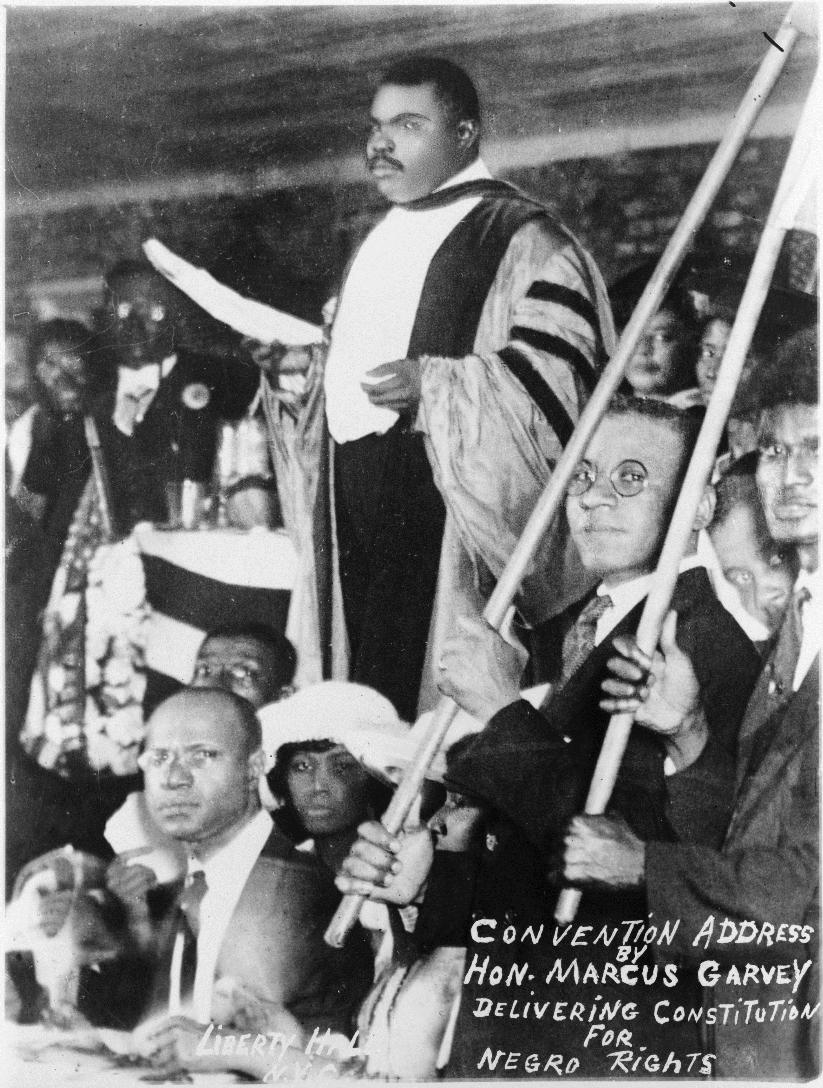
Garvey in his attire in 1922

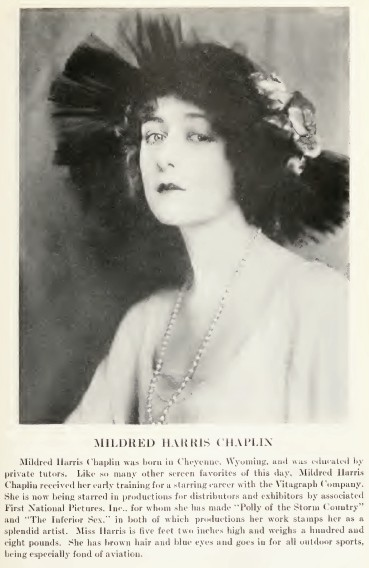
Mildred Harris

- The first international meeting of the Universal Negro Improvement Association (UNIA) at New York's Madison Square Garden before a crowd of about 15,000 people who had come to hear an address by Marcus Garvey in favor of the Back-to-Africa movement. "[A]ttired in a gorgeous robe of purple, gold and green," the Jamaican-born Garvey said "The hour has come for the 400,000,000 negroes to claim Africa as their home. Africa shall be the home of the black peoples of the earth. We pledge our sacred blood on the fields of Africa for our liberty and our freedom."
- Italy, financially burdened by its administration of Albania as a protectorate, signed an agreement at the Albanian capital of Tirana, withdrawing its troops from all Albanian territory except for the island of Suseno, and ending the protectorate that had been established on June 23, 1917.
- The U.S. Association of Railway Executives announced that the cost of interstate passenger railroad travel would take effect on August 20, and the cost for shipping freight would rise on August 25. Rates for travel and shipping within a state were controlled by the individual state governments.
- William Bross Lloyd, a Chicago attorney and financial backer of the Communist Labor Party of America, was found guilty of violating the Sedition Act of 1918 in their anti-government speeches. He and 19 other Communists were tried by a single jury in a state court in Chicago, and all received jail sentences ranging from one to five years. Special Prosecutor Frank Comerford told reporters that the decision was "a history-making verdict which will silence sedition."
- Governor Esteban Cantú Jiménez of the Mexican federal territory of Baja California declared that he was in "open revolt" against the Mexican national government. In announcing the revolt, the Mexican government assured the United States that it was sending troops to the territory, but that it would not permit fighting near the U.S. border. The U.S. State Department, in turn, announced that it had denied Cantú permission to purchase weapons in the United States.
- In Los Angeles, film comedian Charlie Chaplin was sued for divorce by his wife, actress Mildred Harris, who cited as her causes "extreme mental cruelty" and "bodily injury." Mrs. Chaplin's lawyer also asked the court to issue an injunction to prevent Chaplin from selling his ownership rights to his films, valued at $750,000, without accounting to the court for a fair division of marital property.
- Born: Hugh Hickling, British colonial administrator who drafted the Internal Security Act 1960 for Malaysia; in Derby, Derbyshire (d. 2007)
- Died: Ormer Locklear, 28, American stunt pilot and action film star, was killed in a fiery plane crash, along with his co-pilot "Skeets" Elliot, during the filming of The Skywayman (b. 1891)

== August 3, 1920 (Tuesday) ==
- Lige Daniels, a 16-year old African American, was lynched by an angry mob in Center, Texas, where he had been held in jail since the July 29 murder of a 45-year old white woman. While the Shelby County sheriff was out of town, having taken the keys to the jail with him, a mob of more than 1,000 men broke into the courthouse, battered down the steel doors of the jail, then hanged him from an oak tree in front of the building. As with many lynchings at the time, a photograph of the event was widely circulated as a postcard. The Daniels lynching would be forgotten for almost 80 years until the postcard's appearance in 1999 on the cover of Without Sanctuary, a book by Atlanta antique store owner James Allen, who had collected 68 lynching postcards for a revelation of an ignored chapter of American history. The Daniels photo continues to be seen in references to the era.
- Rear Admiral Cary T. Grayson, the personal physician to U.S. President Woodrow Wilson, went on vacation after 10 months, signaling that the president was out of danger. Wilson had suffered a stroke on October 2 and gradually recovered under Dr. Grayson's care.
- Born: P. D. James, British detective novelist, author of the Adam Dalgliesh mysteries; as Phyllis Dorothy James, in Oxford, Oxfordshire (d. 2014)

== August 4, 1920 (Wednesday) ==
- U.S. President Woodrow Wilson ordered U.S. Navy destroyers to block the laying of a Western Union telegraphic cable that would have connected Miami to Barbados to be linked to a cable to Brazil. A British ship equipped for the purpose, the cable layer Colonia, had been chartered by the company to bring the undersea cable line to the Miami harbor, without having waited for the U.S. government to act on its application. On August 6, two U.S. Navy admirals and a U.S. Army colonel boarded Colonia and warned it to stay three miles from shore, outside of U.S. territorial waters. The dispute would drag on for almost two years, until the approval of Western Union's application on June 25, 1922.
- President Adolfo de la Huerta of Mexico, a general in the Mexican Army, removed all military officers from his cabinet except for his Minister of War, and sent them out of the country on diplomatic appointments.
- President Wilson proclaimed December 21 to be honored as "Pilgrim's Day" to celebrate the 300th anniversary of the landing of the Mayflower in America.
- The British cabinet first discussed the possibility of King Faisal of Syria, recently deposed by France, to become the puppet ruler for the British Mandate of Iraq as "King of Mesopotamia."
- Born:
  - Helen Thomas, American journalist who worked for United Press International and Hearst Newspapers in the White House press corps from 1961 to 2010; in Winchester, Kentucky,(d. 2013)
  - John Figueroa, Jamaican poet; in Kingston (d. 1999)
  - Adolph Dubs, American diplomat, U.S. Ambassador to Afghanistan who was kidnapped and killed during a rescue mission; in Chicago (d. 1979, killed)

== August 5, 1920 (Thursday) ==
- Germany's Foreign Minister, Dr. Walter Simons, told the Reichstag that Germany would not allow the Allies to send their troops across German territory to help Poland in the Polish-Soviet War.
- The Executive Council of the League of Nations announced that the first international financial congress would be held at Brussels, starting on September 24.
- Born: Selma Diamond, Canadian-born American comedian, known for portraying bailiff Selma Hacker on the TV series Night Court; in London, Ontario (d. 1985)

== August 6, 1920 (Friday) ==
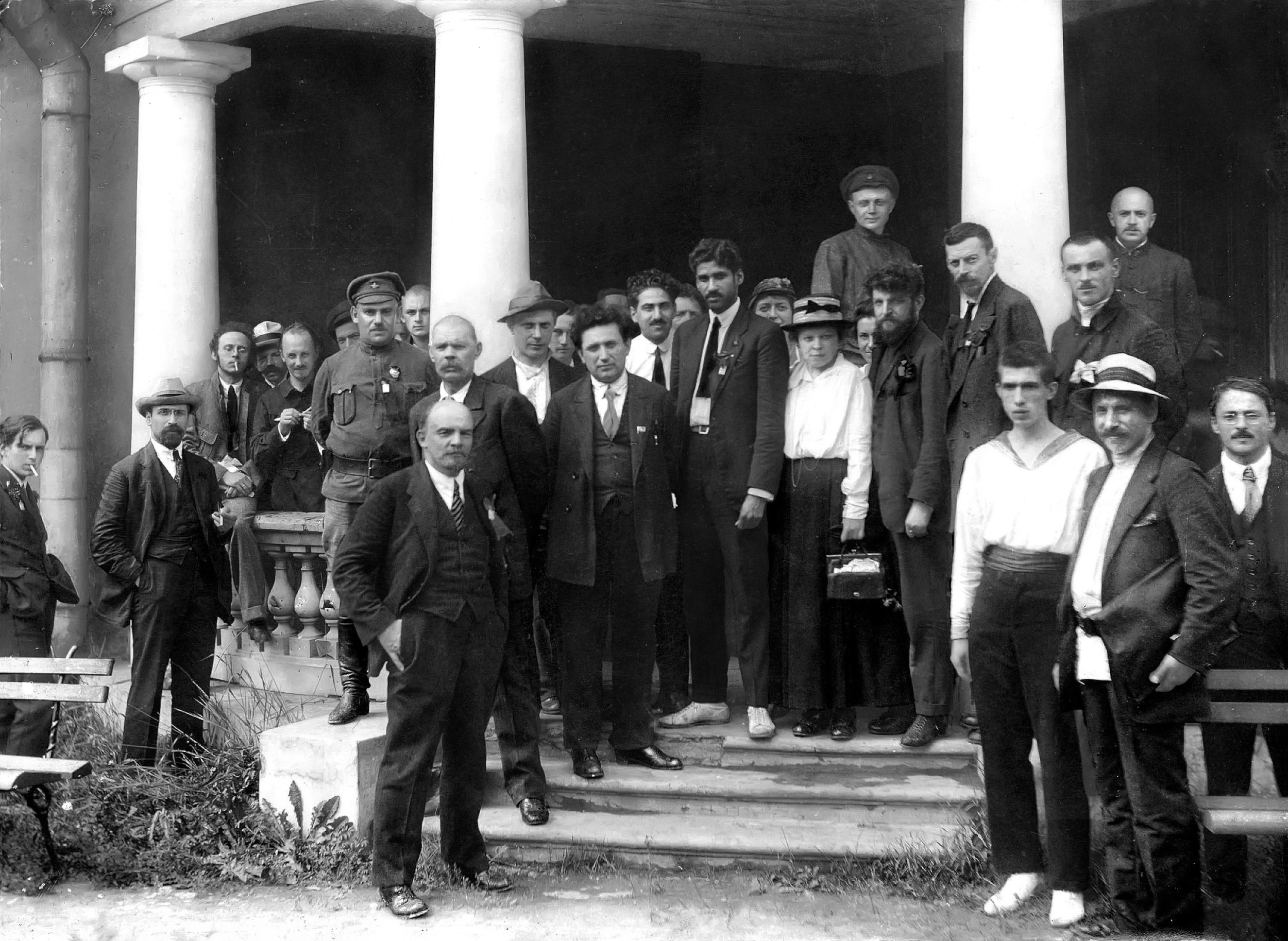
Lenin and the world's Communist leaders

- At Moscow, the "Twenty-one Conditions" for admission to the Communist International (Comintern) were adopted by the delegates to the organization's second World Congress, which had opened on July 19.
- The House of Commons passed the "Irish Crimes Act", 206 to 18. One of the Irish MPs, Joseph Devlin, was suspended when he shouted "I hate, loathe and despise you all!" at his fellow members of parliament.
- U.S. troops were ordered to stop rioting in Denver, Colorado, after five people had been killed and 50 injured (including the Denver police chief, hospitalized after being hit in the head by a brick), during a strike against the Denver Tramway Company.
- Born: Ella Raines, American actress, starred in the 1944 film noir Phantom Lady and later in the short-lived syndicated TV show Janet Dean, Registered Nurse; in Snoqualmie Falls, Washington (d. 1988)

== August 7, 1920 (Saturday) ==
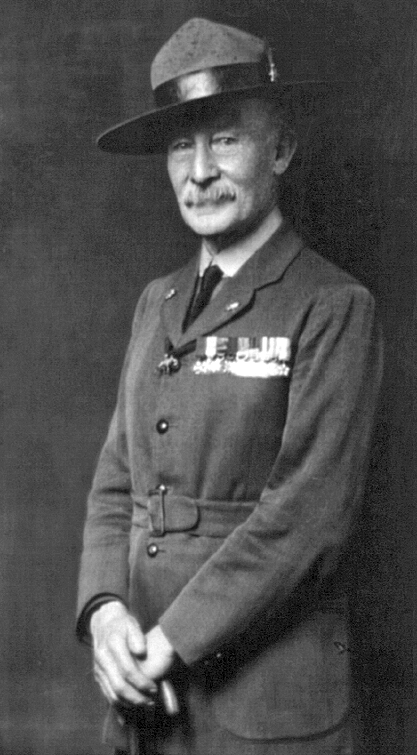
Lord Baden-Powell

- The first World Scout Jamboree came to an end in London at the Olympia Exhibition Hall in West Kensington. Sir Robert Baden-Powell, who had founded the Boy Scouts in 1907, was celebrated by the 8,000 children and adults who had come from around the world with "the shout of pure hero worship... acclaiming their one and undisputed chief and founder" with the honor of Chief Scout of the World. A successor would note later, "This had not been planned as a part of the Jamboree program but was a spontaneous decision by the assembled Scouts."
- The swastika was adopted as the official symbol of Germany's Nazi Party at a conference held in neighboring Austria in Salzburg.
- Lithuania's parliament voted to ratify the Soviet–Lithuanian Peace Treaty that had been signed on July 12. In return, the Soviet Union ordered its remaining troops to leave the Lithuanian Republic.
- Following up on a June 28 announcement, Tennessee Governor Albert H. Roberts called the state legislature into special session, to begin on August 9, to consider ratification of the 19th Amendment to the U.S. Constitution.
- Ohio Governor and Democrat presidential nominee James M. Cox formally began his nationwide campaign by delivering his acceptance speech at festivities in his hometown of Dayton, Ohio. "We are in a time which calls for straight thinking, straight talking and straight acting," Cox said, adding "This is no time for wabbling." Cox pledged to bring the United States into the League of Nations, but only on condition that the U.S. would enter only "to maintain peace and comity." "This was the old order of procedure when the action of the national convention was formalized by the candidate being officially told he was the candidate," Cox would write in his memoir. "With the coming of radio, the old method is passing out; nevertheless, acceptance day as an event took on the appearance and character of a festival day in Ohio at that time."
- Born: Francoise Adret, French ballet dancer and choreographer; in Versailles, Yvellines departement, France (d. 2018)

== August 8, 1920 (Sunday) ==
- Two all-metal air mail planes completed "the first transcontinental aerial mail delivery on record" as they arrived at Oakland, California, after an 11-day flight from New York City. Two days later, another bag of mail was brought from San Francisco to New York in four days, 14 hours and 43 minutes— by automobile.
- Born:
  - Leo Chiosso, Italian lyricist and singer, known for his work with Buscaglione e Chiosso; in Chieri (d. 2006)
  - Jimmy Witherspoon, American jump blues singer; in Gurdon, Arkansas (d. 1997)
- Died: Eduard Birnbaum, 65, Polish-born German cantor (b. 1855)

== August 9, 1920 (Monday) ==
- British authorities arrested Irish-born Australian cleric Daniel Mannix, the Roman Catholic Archbishop of Melbourne taking him from the liner RMS Baltic while the vessel was in port at the English port of Queenstown at Blackpool, Lancashire. HMS Wivern, a Royal Navy destroyer, then transported Mannix to Penzance and told him that although he was technically under arrest, he was "free to go anywhere in England except for Liverpool or Manchester."
- Representatives of Britain's Trades Union Congress announced that the union "feels certain that a war is being engineered between the Allied Powers and Soviet Russia on the issue of Poland, and declares that such a war would be an intolerable crime against humanity," then added, "It therefore warns the Government that the whole industrial power of the organised workers will be used to defeat this" and that affiliated unions would be "advised to instruct their members to down tools" for a nationwide strike. Lloyd George and France's Prime Minister Millerand then announced at a conference in Hythe that although the blockade of Russia and supplying of weapons to Poland would continue, no Allied troops would be sent to intervene in the war.
- The House of Lords passed the Restoration of Order in Ireland Act 1920, commonly called the "Irish Crimes bill", and sent it to King George V, who gave the law Royal Assent on the same day. The law provided for Irish nationalists to be tried by court-martial in military courts, rather than by jury in criminal courts.
- After his recent surrender to Mexico's president de la Huerta, Pancho Villa and his disarmed followers returned in triumph to San Pedro in the state of Coahuila. Villa told the crowd of 3,000 "I surrendered because further fighting in Mexico meant intervention by the United States. They call me a bandit. They call me the worst man in Mexico, but I would preserve our nationality by avoiding intervention."
- Born:
  - Willi Heinrich, German soldier and author; in Heidelberg, Weimar Republic (d. 2005)
  - Milton Henschel, American evangelist for the Jehovah's Witnesses and president of the Watch Tower Society from 1992 until his death; in Pomona, New Jersey (d. 2003)
- Died: Sir Samuel Griffith, 75, first Chief Justice of Australia, who served from 1903 to 1919 (b. 1845)

== August 10, 1920 (Tuesday) ==
- Ottoman Sultan Mehmed VI's representatives signed the Treaty of Sèvres with the Allied Powers, confirming arrangements for the partitioning of the Ottoman Empire. The treaty ceremony was held "in the display room of a Sevres china factory just outside of Paris." The full details of the division of the Ottoman Empire by Britain, France and Italy, were not revealed until almost three months later.
- African American singer Mamie Smith & the Jazz Hounds recorded "Crazy Blues", a bestselling song for OKeh Records that made history by making her the first of many successful black recording artists, becoming recognized as a milestone for the Jazz Age, and serving as one of the first recorded songs to be purchased across racial lines. In 1993, the National Academy of Recording Arts and Sciences would induct Smith into the Grammy Hall of Fame and describe "Crazy Blues" as a song that "is often cited as the first blues recording.".
- U.S. Secretary of State Bainbridge Colby announced the American position in the Polish-Soviet War, declaring that although the U.S. would not recognize the legitimacy of the Soviet government in Moscow, it would ask for an international agreement to preserve Russia's territory from being split up and to withdraw all foreign troops, including the U.S. Army, from Russian territory. The note, originally addressed to Italy's Ambassador to the U.S., was made public as a declaration of policy. "That the present rulers of Russia do not rule by the will or the consent of any considerable proportion of the Russian people is an incontestable fact," Colby wrote, and went on to say "It is not possible for the Government of the United States to recognize the present rulers of Russia as a Government with which the relations common to friendly Governments can be maintained."
- The U.S. Railway Labor Board granted a wage increase of $30 million to 75,000 railway express workers, retroactive to May 1, an average increase of 16 cents per hour.
- U.S. President Wilson called an August 13 meeting, in Cleveland, of union representatives and coal operators to discuss the adjustment of inequalities in the Bituminous Coal Commission Award.
- Born: William "Red" Holzman, American professional basketball player and coach, lead the New York Knicks to two NBA championships as the team's coach; in New York City (d. 1998)
- Died:
  - Adam Politzer, 84, Hungarian-Austrian physician and a founder of the specialty of otology (b. 1835)
  - James O'Neill, 72, Irish-born American stage and film actor, father of playwright Eugene O'Neill (b. 1847)

== August 11, 1920 (Wednesday) ==
Latvia

Soviet Russia

- The Latvian–Soviet Peace Treaty was signed in Riga at 12:30 in the afternoon local time, with the Soviet government of Russia recognizing the independence of Latvia. The Soviets agreed to renounce all claims to Latvia "in eternity" and would do so for almost twenty years before creating the Latvian Soviet Socialist Republic and annexing it into the USSR on August 5, 1940.
- Charles Wilson, a prisoner at the county jail in Pottsville, Pennsylvania, died after a hunger strike of 43 days. Wilson did not reveal his reasons, and the jail administration took the position that "No forcible efforts will be made to feed him, it having been decided that a man may lawfully starve himself to death if he wants to."

== August 12, 1920 (Thursday) ==
- Terence MacSwiney, the Mayor of Cork was arrested by British troops and charged with sedition, to be tried in military court, for holding a meeting of the Sinn Féin in the Cork City Hall. Within five days, he was court-martialed, convicted, and put on board a ship to be taken to a prison in England. In prison, he would begin a hunger strike and die of starvation.
- Charles Ponzi was arrested for defrauding investors of seven million dollars, after surrendering to federal authorities at the Boston federal courthouse.

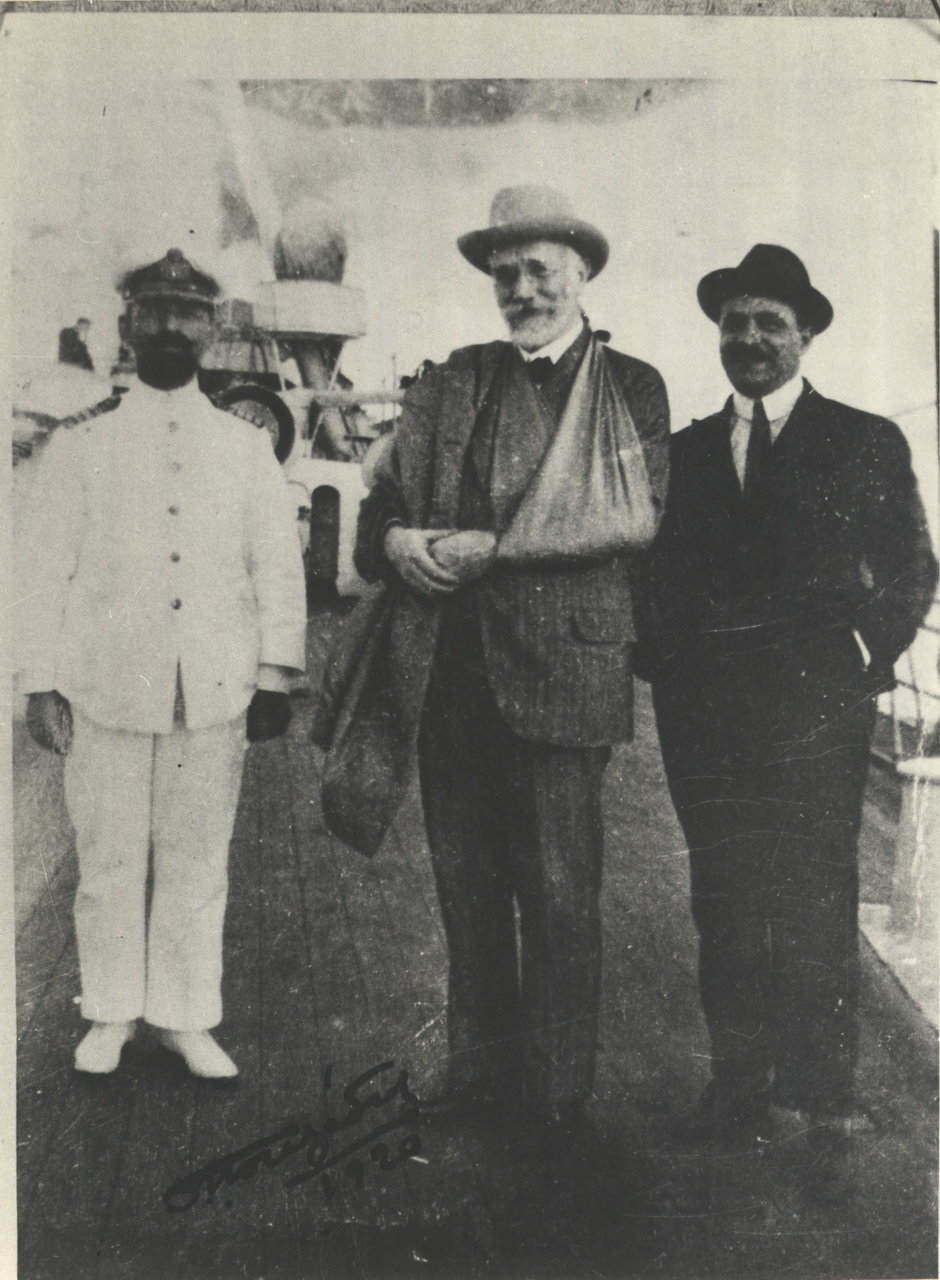
Venizelos after being shot

- Greece's Prime Minister Eleutherios Venizelos was wounded in an assassination attempt by Greek royalists while in France at the Lyon railway station. Bullets struck him in the left shoulder and left thigh before the attackers were subdued and beaten by bystanders.
- Died: Hermann von Struve, 65, Russian-born German astronomer and the developer of the Struve function (b. 1854)

== August 13, 1920 (Friday) ==
- The Battle of Warsaw began as Soviet troops closed within 20 miles (32 km) of Poland's capital.
- Czechoslovakia and Yugoslavia entered into treaty negotiations to create a "Little Entente" among Balkan nations.
- The Tennessee State Senate voted, 25 to 4, to ratify the 19th Amendment to the U.S. Constitution, which had been ratified by 35 of the 48 states and required only one more to become the law of the land. The measure then moved on to the 100-member state house of representatives.
- The red, black and green Pan-African Flag was first introduced, as part of the proceedings of the Universal Negro Improvement Association convention at Madison Square Garden.
- Born: Neville Brand, American film and TV actor, star of the TV western Laredo; in Griswold, Iowa (d. 1992)

== August 14, 1920 (Saturday) ==
- The 1920 Summer Olympics were opened at Antwerp in Belgium, with 1,612 athletes and officials, representing 27 nations.
- The Mexican state of Jalisco joined Baja California in the rebellion against the Huerta government.

== August 15, 1920 (Sunday) ==
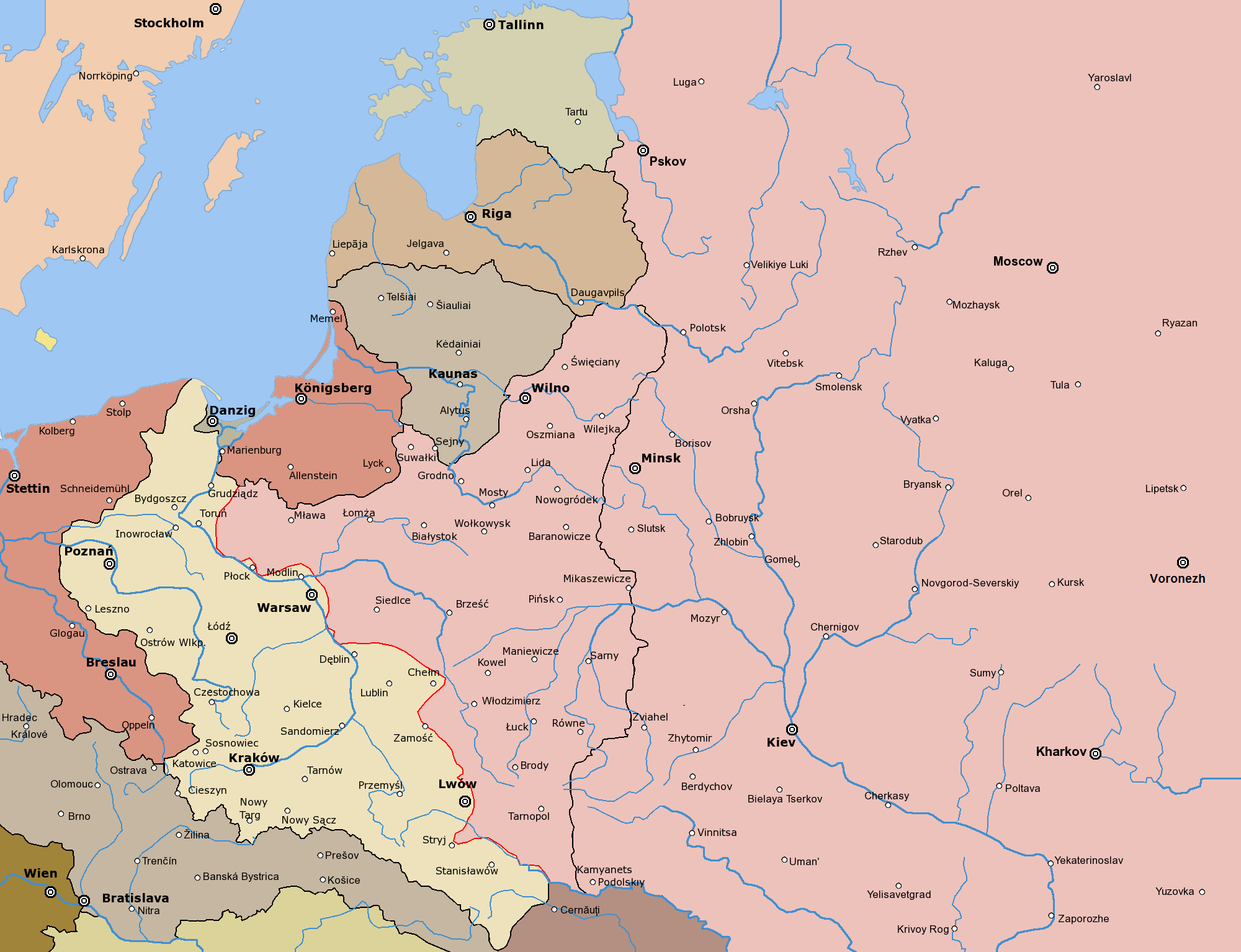
Russia's furthest drive into Poland

- The "Miracle of the Vistula" (Cudem nad Wisłą) took place as the Army of Poland turned the tide of the Polish–Soviet War, just as Soviet Russian armies had approached to within only 8 miles (13 km) of the capital at Warsaw near the Vistula River. Under the command of General Józef Piłsudski, Polish forces lured General Mikhail Tukhachevsky's approaching Russian divisions into spreading out too far, then outflanked and surrounded them, stopping the Russians from encircling Warsaw. One historian, Jerzy Borzęcki, later described the turning point of the battle as the recapture of the Warsaw suburb of Radzymin by units led by General Lucjan Żeligowski, followed by General Wladyslaw Sikorsky ordering one of the two defending armies to attack the stronger Russian force. Borzęcki wrote "This unusual tactic would most likely have ended in catastrophe if not for an unexpected lucky turn," when a Polish regiment destroyed the radio center of the Russian 4th Army, commanded by Aleksandr Shuvayev. Shuvayev's troops were unable to communicate with General Tukhachevsky, and continued their westward march "instead of striking at Sikorski's left flank." An attack on Sikorsky at that point "would most likely have spelled his utter defeat." The Viscount D'Abernon would write in 1931, "Had Pilsudski and Weygand failed to arrest the triumphant advance of the Soviet Army at the Battle of Warsaw, not only would Christianity have experienced a dangerous reverse, but the very existence of Western civilisation would have been imperilled... it is probable that the Battle of Warsaw saved Central and parts of Western Europe from a more subversive danger-the fanatical tyranny of the Soviet. On the essential point, there can be little room for doubt; had the Soviet forces overcome Polish resistance ... Bolshevism would have spread throughout Central Europe and might well have penetrated the whole continent."
- An attempt to arrest Democratic presidential nominee James M. Cox was made by police in Jacksontown, Ohio, after the Ohio Governor's chauffeur drove him through the town on the way from Wheeling, West Virginia, back to the state capital at Columbus, Ohio. Two constables on motorcycles stopped the cars and one, Joe Shipley, demanded "I want you fellows to come back to town and go to court. You've been speeding." Cox told the constable, "If you want me you will find me at the State House in Columbus," then ordered his chauffeur to drive him onward. Ohio's state adjutant general, Roy E. Layton, issued a statement charging that Republican officials in Jacksontown had acted in a "plot to cause the Governor's humiliation;" the town was famous in Ohio as a "speed trap."
- Manuel Gondra was inaugurated as the new President of Paraguay.

== August 16, 1920 (Monday) ==
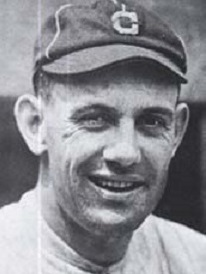
Ray Chapman

- Baseball shortstop Ray Chapman of the Cleveland Indians was struck in the head while at bat against pitcher Carl Mays of the New York Yankees, and became the first and only Major League Baseball player to be fatally injured during a game. Chapman died the next day, at the age of 29. When the fifth inning began, the Indians had a 3 to 1 lead and Chapman was the first player up to bat. He had one ball and one strike and was attempting to dodge the next pitch, "a fast underhand throw", when he was hit in the left side of the head. According to the Associated Press, "The crack of the ball as it struck the player's head was so loud the spectators and players thought it hit his bat." The ball bounced back on to the infield and Mays, "unaware that he had injured the batter," fielded the ball and threw it to Wally Pipp at first base for the out. Chapman collapsed and was taken to St. Laurence Hospital. After midnight, Chapman was in surgery from for more than an hour for emergency surgery and died at 4:50 in the morning.
- Born: Charles Bukowski, German-born American writer; as Heinrich Karl Bukowski, in Andernach, Weimar Republic (d. 1994)
- Died: Norman Lockyer, 84, English astronomer, co-discoverer of helium, founder and first editor of the British scientific journal Nature (b. 1836)

== August 17, 1920 (Tuesday) ==
- Members of the International Longshoremen's Association voted to end a strike of the ports on the U.S. east coast, and announced that they would return on Thursday at the pay same received before the walkout, 65 cents per hour and a one dollar per hour for overtime. The strike had started on March 12, and had become worse in April when unionized truck drivers began boycotting the piers that were on strike.
- With only one more state's ratification necessary to make the 19th Amendment part of the United States Constitution and permitting women nationwide the right to vote, the North Carolina state senate voted, 25 to 23, to postpone consideration until after the November elections. At the same time, it was unclear whether the Tennessee state house of representatives would follow the state senate in voting for ratification.
- Born: Maureen O'Hara, Irish-born American film actress and leading lady, remembered as John Wayne's co-star in multiple films; as Maureen FitzSimons, in Ranelagh, Ireland (d. 2015)
- Died: Ray Chapman, 29, American baseball player, died the day after being struck in the head by a pitched ball during a major league game (b. 1891)

== August 18, 1920 (Wednesday) ==
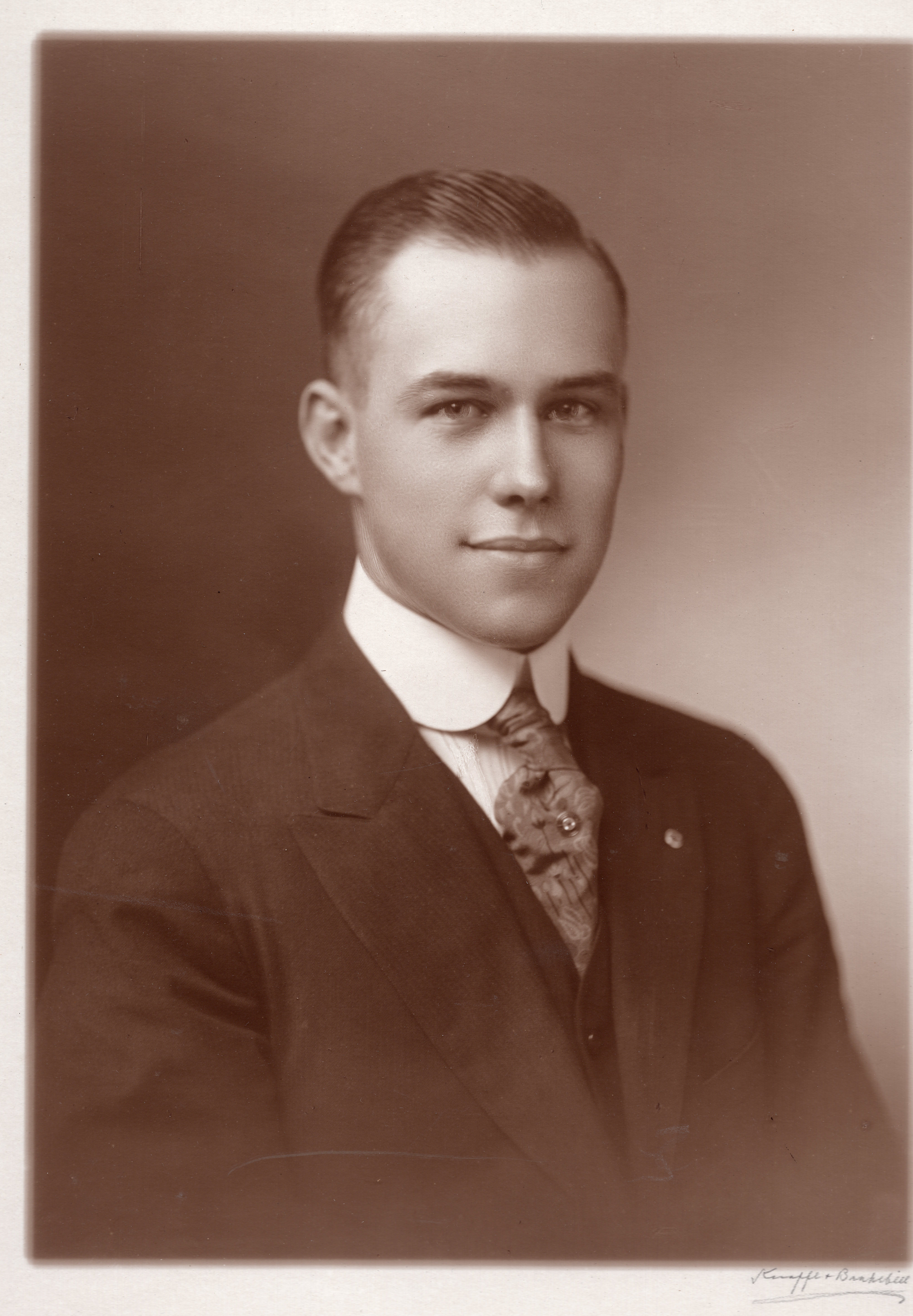
Harry Burn

- By a final vote of 50 to 46, the Tennessee state House of Representatives approved the Senate resolution to ratify the 19th Amendment. Taken first was a vote to table consideration of whether to concur in the Senate vote until the next session of the legislature and, after a 48 to 48 tie, the attempt failed and the members were asked to vote yes or no on whether to concur. Harry T. Burn, a 24-year old legislator, had been one of the members who had voted to table the resolution, but having made a promise to his mother to support suffrage if it came up for a vote, surprised the crowd by switching sides to join the 48 legislators in favor of ratification. Banks Pearson Turner, another legislator who had favored tabling the matter, passed when the roll was called and, a reporter noted, "Visibly a great battle was going on within him as to what he should do." When the last legislator on the roll, J. H. Womack, voted yes, the vote was 48 in favor and 47 against, with Pearson asked whether to vote against (for a 48–48 deadlock) or for the amendment. Pearson went in favor and the vote was 49 to 47 for ratification. House Speaker Seth Walker then switched his vote from no to yes, giving the ratification a 50 to 46 majority.
- French Army troops at Kattowitz in Germany (now Katowice in Poland) were attacked by striking German coal miners. The soldiers fired into the crowd, killing 10 of the miners.
- Born: Shelley Winters (stage name for Shirley Schrift), American actress, two-time Academy Award winner; in St. Louis (d. 2006)

== August 19, 1920 (Thursday) ==
- The Polish residents of Upper Silesia rose up against the area's German occupiers at Kattowitz (modern-day Katowice) and Beuthen (modern Bytom). Reportedly 11 civilians were killed at Beuthen and eight at Kattowitz. The uprising would last for almost a week, coming to an end on August 25.
- The Tambov Rebellion, one of the largest peasant rebellions against the Bolsheviks in the Russian Civil War began as Alexander Antonov organized a resistance to the forced confiscation of grain by Soviet Russian authorities. Antonov's army would grow to 40,000 fighters before its suppression a year later.

== August 20, 1920 (Friday) ==
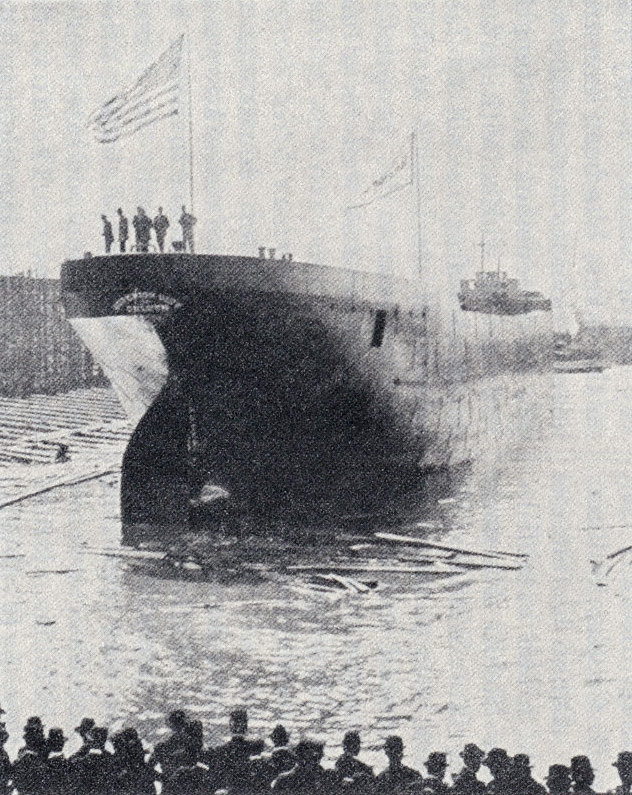
SS Superior City

- The first commercial radio station in the United States, 8MK, began operations in Detroit. It was owned by William E. Scripps, owner of The Detroit News, and operated from the second floor of the Detroit News building. Elton Plant, an office boy at the News, opened the broadcast as the first U.S. radio announcer "because he had a good speaking and singing voice." The initial broadcast was "thought to have been heard by listeners in at least 30 Detroit homes." In 1921, 8MK would change its call letters to WBL and is now WWJ, an all-news radio station.
- Twenty-nine people were killed in the sinking of the American freighter SS Superior City after it collided with another ship, the Willis L. King while sailing on Lake Superior. One of the four survivors reported that "members of her crew were calmly donning life belts and waiting for the orders" to board the lifeboats when the ship's boilers suddenly exploded. The ship went down two minutes later.
- Four professional football team owners in Ohio met at the offices of Ralph Hay in Canton, Ohio, to come to an agreement about what would become the first pro football league, with plans to invite owners of more teams for a second meeting on September 17. The American Professional Football Conference (APFC) was made up of the Canton Bulldogs, Akron Pros, the Cleveland Tigers and the Dayton Triangles, who decided on a six-game schedule to play each other at home-and-away, an agreement to respect each other's player contracts, and to take a stand against signing college students whose class had not yet graduated.
- Democratic Party presidential candidate James M. Cox said in a speech at South Bend, Indiana, that wealthy members of the Republican Party were trying to "buy the presidency" with a $15,000,000 donation to Republican candidate Warren G. Harding.
- Paul Hymans, the Foreign Minister of Belgium, was elected to preside over the first assembly of the League of Nations, scheduled for November 15 in Brussels. "Had America been in the League," a wire service noted, "Mr. Wilson [the U.S. president] or the senior of the American delegates would have been chosen, but in the absence of America, Mr. Hymans was selected.
- Czechoslovakia and Yugoslavia signed the treaty to create the mutual defense pact nicknamed "The Little Entente," in a ceremony at Belgrade.

== August 21, 1920 (Saturday) ==
- The first wireless radio transmission from the world's most powerful station, the Lafayette transmitter in France, was made. Located at Marcheprime, near Bordeaux, the station had been completed by the United States Navy at French government expense and would be turned over to the French government after completion of tests. Listening in Washington, D.C., U.S. Secretary of the Navy Josephus Daniels was among those to hear the initial transmission, which proclaimed that "This is the first wireless message to be heard around the world, and marks a milestone on the road of scientific achievement."
- Aladdin al-Droubi, who had recently been appointed as the Prime Minister of Syria, was murdered, along with the Minister of War, the Minister of the Interior, and 27 other people when the train he was on stopped at Darat Izza and a group of killers boarded, shot the group, and left.
- Twelve schoolchildren in Mahim, a suburb of Bombay in British India, were drowned while attending a picnic organized by the American mission there. Reportedly, the children waded out to a sand bank and were caught by surprise by a sudden wave at high tide.
- Ten coal miners were killed in an explosion near Wilburton, Oklahoma, after ventilation fans in one of the mines shafts ceased working.
- Having served its function of controlling wartime distribution of food in the United States during World War One, and relief to starving nations after the end of the War, the United States Food Administration was abolished by Executive Order 3320. The federal agency had been established three years earlier, on August 10, 1917, four months after the American entry into the ongoing world war.
- Born: Christopher Robin Milne, English author and bookseller, only son of author A. A. Milne and inspiration for the Winnie-the-Pooh books; in Chelsea, London (d. 1996)

== August 22, 1920 (Sunday) ==
- The Salzburg Festival was inaugurated, as an annual celebration of culture, by playwright Max Reinhardt with the performance of his play, Jedermann (Everyman) on Cathedral Square in front of the Austrian city's old cathedral.
- In Lisburn, a suburb of Belfast, Irish nationalists shot and killed the Royal Irish Constabulary policeman charged by a grand jury with the March 20 murder of Cork Mayor Tomas Mac Curtain. Inspector Oswald Swanzy was walking home from church services when three armed men with rifles confronted him and opened fire. When Swanzy fell down, they fired again, and then left in a waiting taxicab. Swanzy was the eighth RIC officer to be shot and killed during the week. Rioting followed and, in retaliation, Catholic owned businesses in Lisburn were burned down. In the days that followed, homes in Belfast's predominantly Roman Catholic Shankhill District were burned and 17 people, both Catholic and Protestant had died in rioting.
- Hannes Kolehmainen of Finland won the marathon at the Summer Olympics at Antwerp and set a new world's record of 2 hours, 32 minutes and 35.8 seconds despite racing "through mud and rain." The record would stand for more than five years before being broken by Albert Michelsen of the U.S. on October 12, 1925. In the nearly 100 years since Kolehmainen's run, the race has been run more than 30 minutes more quickly, with Eliud Kipchoge of Kenya holding the current record of 2 hours, 1 minute and 39 seconds. The first woman to best Kolehmainen's mark was Joan Samuelson of the U.S. in 1980.
- Born: Ray Bradbury, American science fiction author; in Waukegan, Illinois (d. 2012)
- Died: Anders Zorn, 60, Swedish portrait painter and sculptor (b. 1860)

== August 23, 1920 (Monday) ==
- At a bullring in Barcelona, six amateur bullfighters were killed by an enraged bull. According to reports from the Daily Mail of London and the Washington Herald, some of the victims were gored and others were trampled by the animal before it could be stopped.
- The Bat, a play by Mary Roberts Rinehart and Avery Hopwood, premiered on Broadway at the Morosco Theatre. The production was a success, running for 867 performances on Broadway, and later with a different cast at St James's Theatre in London's West End. The mystery revolved around the identity of a masked criminal whose calling card was "a black paper bat".
- Carl Mays of the New York Yankees pitched for the first time since accidentally killing Ray Chapman a week earlier, with a 10 to 0 win over the visiting Detroit Tigers. According to news reports, "Twice, when his curves broke close to batters, Mays shouted, 'Look out.'"
- Born: Jim Leavelle, American homicide detective who escorted accused presidential assassin Lee Harvey Oswald when he was killed by Jack Ruby; near the town of Detroit, Texas, in Red River County (d. 2019

== August 24, 1920 (Tuesday) ==
- After 55 hours of flying time, four U.S. Army Air Service airplanes landed safely at Nome, in the Alaskan Territory, at 5:30 in the afternoon local time, completing a journey that had started from the New York City aerodrome at Mineola, New York, on Long Island. Altogether, the 8,690 kilometres (5,400 mi) journey had taken 40 days, with multiple stops, after departing on July 15. With four DeHavilland DH-4 aircraft, the "Black Wolf Squadron" had been organized by U.S. Army Brigadier General Billy Mitchell, to promote the role of the airplane in national defense.
- The penultimate step in universal women's suffrage in the United States took place as Tennessee's Governor Albert H. Roberts signed the resolution ratifying the 19th Amendment, and then arranged for its delivery to the U.S. Department of State for certification.
- Born: Herbert Haft, American entrepreneur who developed Dart Drugs chain of pharmacies, followed by the Dart Group conglomerate other low-cost outlets like Shoppers Food Warehouse and Trak Auto; in Baltimore (d. 2004)

== August 25, 1920 (Wednesday) ==
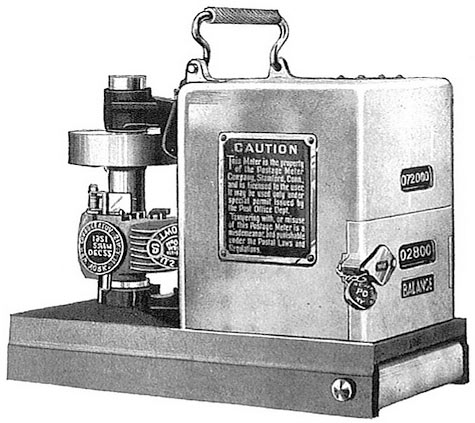
The Model M

- The postage meter was first approved by the United States Post Office Department for use by business offices in place of postage stamps. Previously, postage meters had been used only by the post offices themselves. The Pitney Bowes company, which previously had provided meters to the post offices, was given exclusive recognition for use by businesses of the Model M, its simpler "mail marking machine and postage meter," which had been awarded a patent on July 18.
- The Red Army was defeated by Polish defenders in the Battle of Warsaw.
- The American gunboat USS Sacramento was dispatched to the Honduras port of La Ceiba to protect American citizens.

== August 26, 1920 (Thursday) ==
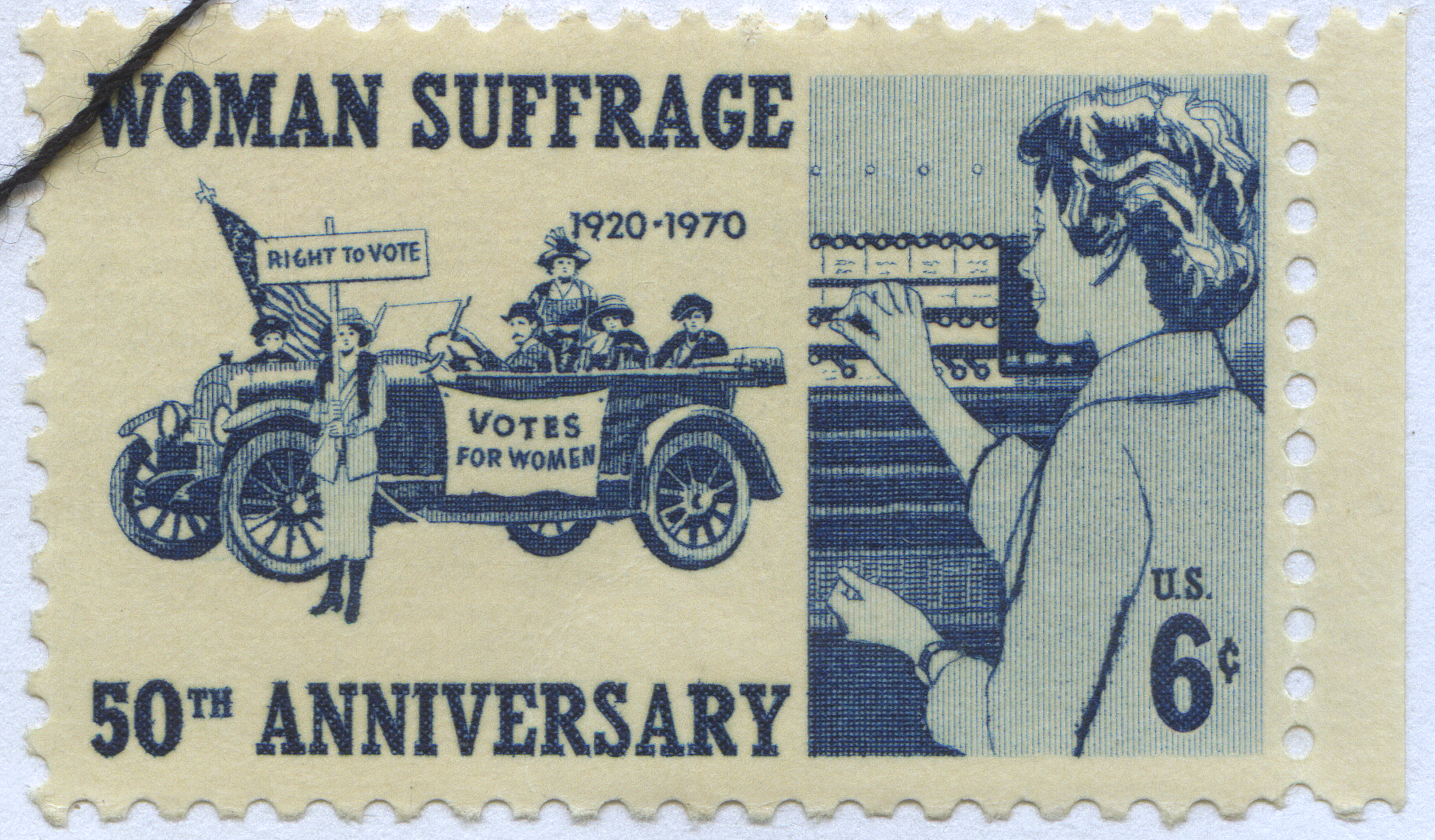
1970 commemorative U.S. stamp

- U.S. Secretary of State Bainbridge Colby proclaimed the ratification of the Nineteenth Amendment to the United States Constitution, eight days after Tennessee had voted to ratify, and two days after Tennessee Governor Roberts signed the resolution. Despite requests from the press and from suffragists for a ceremony at the State Department offices, Colby waited until he got a phone call from his office about the arrival of the request from Tennessee and asked for the necessary paperwork to be brought to his home at 1507 K Street N.W. in Washington, and signed the proclamation at 8:00 in the morning. Colby and two State Department officials, F. K. Nielsen and Charles L. Cook, were the only witnesses to the signing.
- The price of railroad tickets for interstate passenger travel and freight shipping increased for the first time since the First World War. A 20 percent increase in passenger fares was allowed, and the standard cost of a trip from Madison, Wisconsin, to San Francisco went from $76.33 to $91.61 (equivalent to $1,220 in 2020). Additional charges for a bed on a Pullman car increased by half, becoming 35 percent added to the train fare; the $91.61 trip would cost an additional $32 for Pullman services, about $425 extra in current dollars.
- Born:
  - Richard E. Bellman, American mathematician and computer scientist who introduced dynamic programming, and known for the Bellman equation, the Bellman–Ford algorithm, and other contributions to the field; in New York City (d. 1984)
  - Prem Tinsulanonda, prime minister of Thailand from 1980 to 1988 and briefly the regent of Thailand for seven weeks after the death of King Bhumibol Adulyadej and the proclamation of Vajiralongkorn as King in 2016; in Songkhla Province (d. 2019)
- Died: James Wilson, 85, U.S. Secretary of Agriculture from 1897 to 1913 (b. 1836)

== August 27, 1920 (Friday) ==
- The first radio broadcast from what one source describes as "the oldest radio station in the world" began at 9:00 in the evening when the Sociedad Radio Argentina aired a live performance of Richard Wagner's opera Parsifal from the Teatro Coliseo in Buenos Aires. Roughly 20 homes had radios at the time.
- The first voting in the U.S. to be conducted under the protections of the 19th Amendment took place in the city of South St. Paul, Minnesota, where voters were presented the question of whether to approve a bond issue for an $85,000 water line extension. While women in some states had been allowed to vote in all elections prior to 1920, women in other ratifying states (including Minnesota) were only allowed to vote in the presidential election. Marguerite Newburgh voted moments after the polls opened at 6:00 in the morning.
- Four days of voting began in Guatemala for a new president, and Carlos Herrera, the acting president since April, was approved for a six-year term. Herrera would serve only 15 months before being overthrown in a coup d'état.
- Irish-American longshoremen in New York City, and many of their co-workers, showed their disagreement with the jailing of Cork Mayor MacSweeney by refusing to work on freight ships that were coming from or going to Great Britain.

== August 28, 1920 (Saturday) ==
- The All-Russia Population Census, the first since 1897, was taken. The results would be published in 1922. The population was reported as being approximately 131,546,000 of which 70,517,000 was female and 61,029,000 was male.
- Spain's national soccer football team played its first international match, defeating Denmark, 1 to 0, at the 1920 Summer Olympics in Antwerp. Patricio Arabolaza scored the first goal. Spain would get the gold medal in Olympic competition.

== August 29, 1920 (Sunday) ==
- Pope Benedict XV became the first pontiff to invite a motion picture crew into the Vatican for "the most complete pictures ever taken of Vatican ceremonies." The Pope cooperated with American photographers and newsreel filmmakers in conjunction with a mass for the American Knights of Columbus.
- The baggage carriers' strike in New York ended with a 22% pay raise and an increase of 25 cents per piece of luggage.
- Born:
  - Otis Boykin, American inventor and engineer, invented the heart pacemaker; in Dallas (d. 1982)
  - Charlie Parker, American jazz saxophonist and composer, Grammy Award winner and enshrinee in the Big Band and Jazz Hall of Fame; in Kansas City, Kansas (d. 1955)

== August 30, 1920 (Monday) ==
- Islamic clerics in the Muntafiq district of Mesopotamia (now the Dhi Qar Governorate of Iraq) called for a jihad against the British mandate administrators.
- U.S. President Wilson announced his approval of the Anthracite Wage Commission recommendation for wage increases of at least 17% for anthracite coal miners.
- In Italy, 300 metal-working plants were seized by employees.
- The tercentenary of the landing of the Pilgrims at Provincetown, Massachusetts, was observed, with representatives from Britain, France and the Netherlands in attendance.
- Born: Ali Sabri, Egyptian politician, prime minister of Egypt from 1962 to 1965; in Cairo (d. 1991)

== August 31, 1920 (Tuesday) ==
- The first radio news broadcast was made from Detroit's station 8MK, with an announcer telling results of that day's Republican primary election voting in Michigan and around Detroit. On the day of the broadcast, 8MK's owner, the Detroit News, informed radio owners that the program could be heard within a 100 miles (160 km) radius of Detroit and could be heard by tuning receivers to the 200 meter wavelength (equivalent to 1500 kHz on AM radio).
- Three days after the 19th Amendment took effect nationwide, members of the Tennessee House of Representatives attempted to take back their vote for ratification that had made their state the necessary 36th of 48 to give women the right to vote in all states. With a quorum present for the first time since the August 18 approval had been voted, the House voted, 47 to 24 (and 20 abstaining), in favor of a resolution that "expunged from its journal all record of ratification of the federal suffrage amendment" and to "nonconcur" in the ratification vote of the state senate. No attempt was made, however, to attempt to get the state senate (which had voted 25 to 4 for ratification) to join in reversing the decision.
- The first election for office to be held after the 19th Amendment took effect was conducted in Hannibal, Missouri, and 147 women who had recently been given the right of suffrage took part. In a vote to fill a vacancy in the Hannibal City Council, the 147 women were among 503 people to cast ballots. Four days earlier, women in South St. Paul, Minnesota, had participated in a yes/no vote for financing a water project, but the Missouri vote was the first to present a choice between candidates. W. H. McDonald was elected an alderman in the election. Marie Ruoff Byrum was the first woman to exercise her new rights to vote for a candidate when the precinct opened at 7:00 in the morning.
- John Lloyd Wright was granted U.S. Patent Number 1,351,086 for interlocking wooden pieces under the identification "Toy-cabin construction," a toy that would be marketed as Lincoln Logs.
- The Philadelphia Phillies, in last place in baseball's National League, defeated the Chicago Cubs in what seemed like an ordinary game. Four days later, however, Cubs owner William Veeck called for an investigation on suspicion that gamblers had paid some of the Cubs players to lose the game. The Chicago grand jury investigation that followed would find no evidence pointing to the Cubs, but would lead to a scandal involving Chicago's other team, the White Sox.
- Italian poet Gabriele D'Annunzio made public the text of a constitution that he had written for the port of Fiume to be declared an independent nation as "The Italian Regency of Quarnero". D'Annunzio, whose constitution was reportedly "written in poetic style", said that the question of whether Fiume would become its own state would be decided on September 11.
- French Army General Henri Gouraud, France's administrator for the Mandate for Syria and the Lebanon, signed Formal Decree number 318, establishing the boundaries of the future nation of Lebanon, a day before proclaiming the "State of Greater Lebanon." The border between Lebanon and the future state of Israel was the existing dividing line between French Syria and British Palestine. In separating Lebanon from Syria, Gouraud set the Nahr al-Kabir as Lebanon's northern border and the range of the "Anti-Lebanon Mountains" as the eastern limit.
- Died: Wilhelm Wundt, 88, German psychologist and pioneer in experimental psychology (b. 1832)
