= 1916 Cleveland Indians (NFL) season =

American football team season

1916 Cleveland Indians season
- Head coach: Peggy Parratt
- Home stadium: League Park

Results
- Record: 8–3–1

The 1916 Cleveland Indians season was their first season in existence. The team played in the Ohio League and would go on to post an 8-3-1 record.

== Schedule ==
Game	Date	Opponent	Result
1	September 24, 1916	Elyria Andwurs	W 6-3
2	October 1, 1916	at Akron Burkhardts	W 3-0
3	October 8, 1916	Altoona Indians	W 29-7
4	October 15, 1916	Pitcairn Quakers	W 14-6
5	October 22, 1916	Columbus Panhandles	L 9-6
6	October 29, 1916	Akron Burkhardts	W 13-0
7	November 5, 1916	at Canton Bulldogs	L 27-0
8	November 12, 1916	Canton Bulldogs	L 14-7
9	November 19, 1916	Massillon Tigers	T 0-0
10	November 26, 1916	Columbus Panhandles	W 7-0
11	November 30, 1916	at Detroit Heralds	W 20-6
10	December 3, 1916	Toledo Maroons	W 3-0
