= Warren Spahn Award =

Annual baseball award

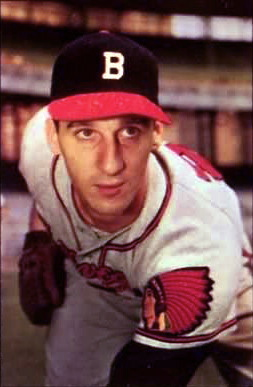
- Warren Spahn in 1953
- Sport: Baseball
- League: Major League Baseball
- Awarded for: Best left-handed pitcher
- Presented by: Oklahoma Sports Hall of Fame

History
- First award: Randy Johnson, 1999
- Most recent: Tarik Skubal, 2025
- Website: Official website

The Warren Spahn Award is presented each season by the Oklahoma Sports Hall of Fame to the best left-handed pitcher in Major League Baseball (MLB). The award is named after Warren Spahn, who holds the MLB record in wins for a left-handed pitcher with 363. The Warren Spahn Award was created in 1999 by Richard Hendricks, the founder of the Territorial Capital Sports Museum, formerly the Oklahoma Sports Museum, to honor Spahn, who resided in Oklahoma. The award was formerly presented at the Masonic Temple in Guthrie, Oklahoma until 2009, when the Oklahoma Sports Hall of Fame was granted ownership of the award, in partnership with the Bricktown Rotary Club. From 2009 to 2019, the award was presented at the annual Warren Spahn Award Gala, hosted by the Bricktown Rotary Club of Oklahoma City. Currently, the Oklahoma Sports Hall of Fame presents each annual award to the winner during season play at their respective team's ballpark.

The award has been won by 15 different pitchers. The winner is chosen based on rankings, which are based on wins, strikeouts, and earned run average. The most recent recipient is Chris Sale of the Atlanta Braves. Randy Johnson received the first four awards from 1999 through 2002. He attended the awards ceremony due to his respect for Spahn, who called him personally to ask him to attend. CC Sabathia (2007–2009), Johan Santana (2004, 2006), Clayton Kershaw (2011, 2013, 2014, 2017), and Blake Snell (2018, 2023) are also multiple Warren Spahn Award winners. Johnson (1999–2002), Santana (2004, 2006), Sabathia (2007) and Kershaw (2011, 2013, 2014), and Snell (2018, 2023) also won the Cy Young Award, given annually to the best pitcher in each league, in years they won the Warren Spahn Award. Santana (2004, 2006), Sabathia (2007), Kershaw (2011, 2013, 2014), and Keuchel (2015) won the Pitcher of the Year Award, given annually to the most outstanding pitcher in each league, in years they won the Warren Spahn Award.

There has been one tie-break in the Warren Spahn Award's history, which occurred when Sabathia defeated the Houston Astros' Wandy Rodríguez to earn his third consecutive award in 2009. The tie-break was decided based on winning percentage.

== Winners ==
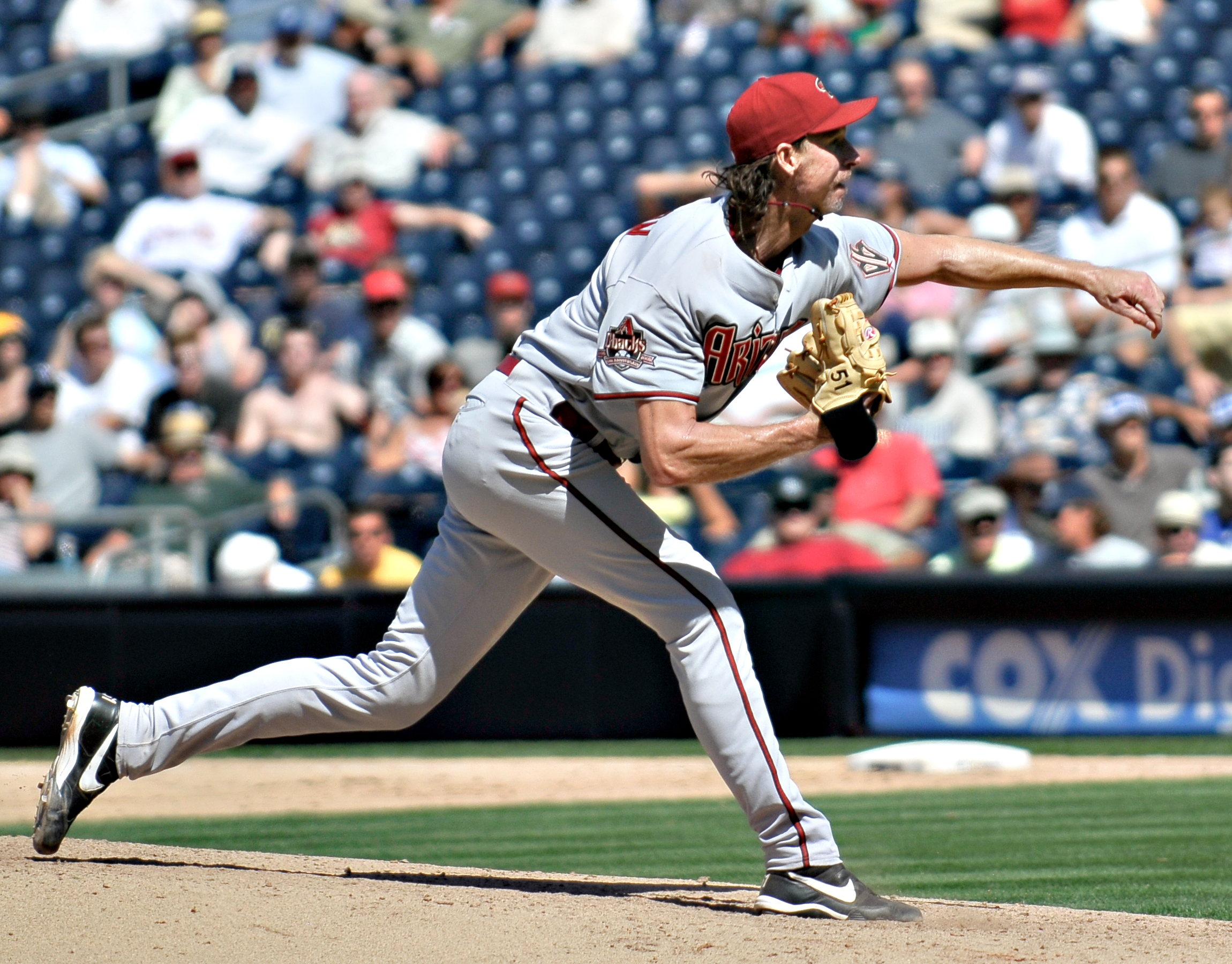
Randy Johnson won the first four Warren Spahn Awards.

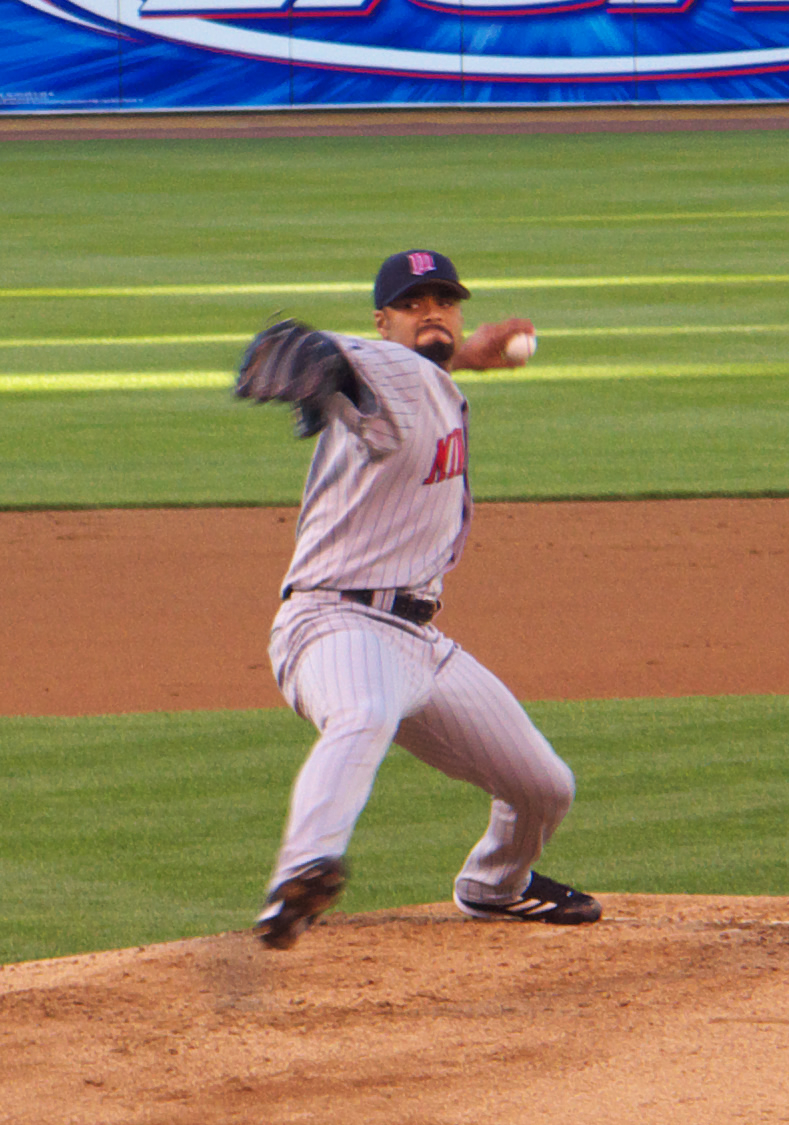
Johan Santana won the Major League Baseball Triple Crown the year of his second Warren Spahn Award.

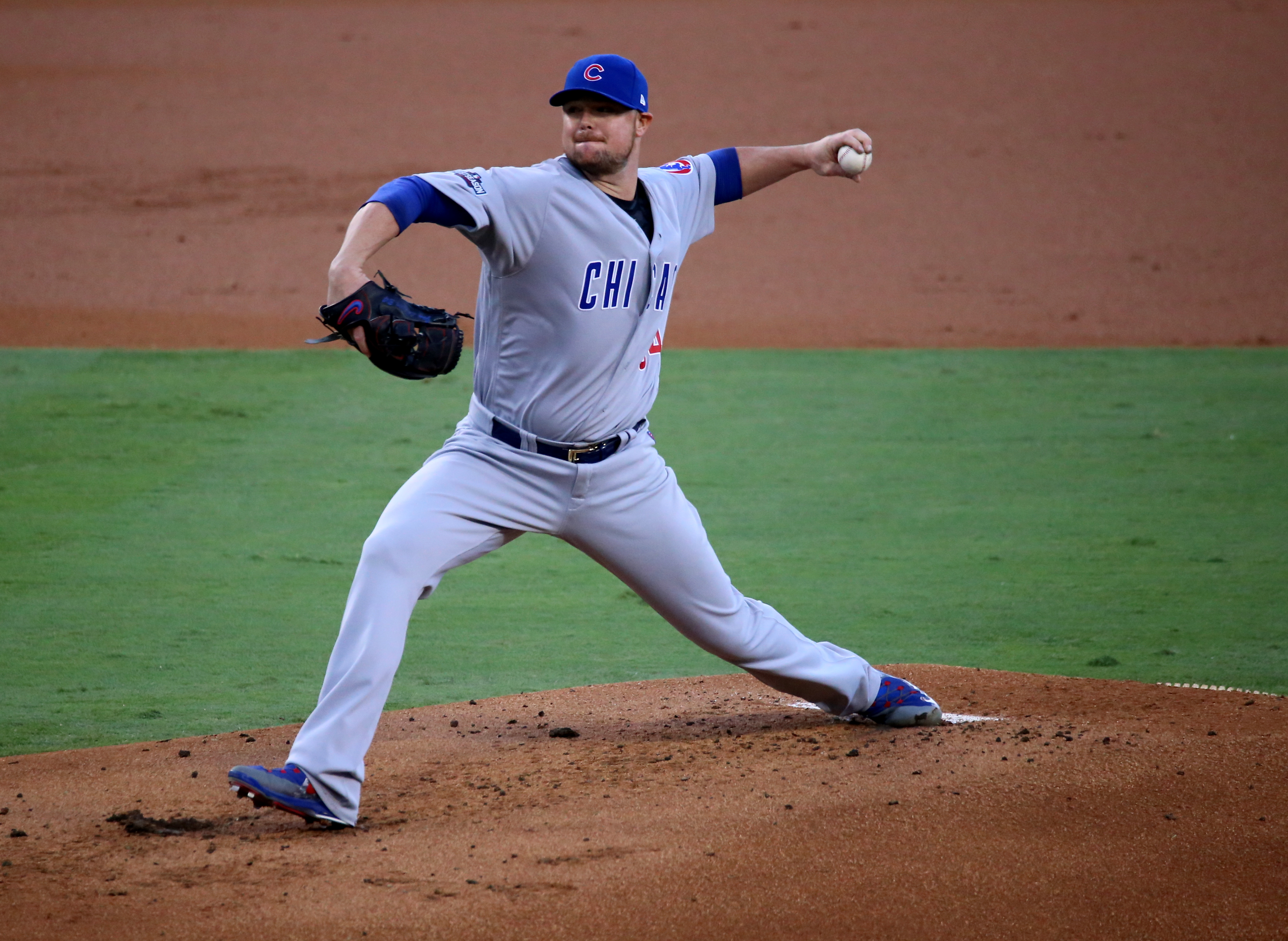
Lester pitching in the 2016 National League Championship Series

Key
Year	The MLB season the award was given
Player (X)	Denotes winning player and number of times they had won the award at that point (if more than one)
W	Wins
ERA	Earned run average
K	Strikeouts
‡	Indicates player won the Cy Young Award that season
Italics	Indicates player led MLB in that category
†	Member of the National Baseball Hall of Fame and Museum

Winners
Year	Pitcher	Team(s)	W	ERA	K	Refs
1999	Randy Johnson ^{†‡}	Arizona Diamondbacks	17	2.48	364	
2000	Randy Johnson (2) ^{†‡}	Arizona Diamondbacks	19	2.64	347	
2001	Randy Johnson (3) ^{†‡}	Arizona Diamondbacks	21	2.49	372	
2002	Randy Johnson (4) ^{†‡}	Arizona Diamondbacks	24	2.32	334	
2003	Andy Pettitte	New York Yankees	21	4.02	180	
2004	Johan Santana ^{‡}	Minnesota Twins	20	2.61	265	
2005	Dontrelle Willis	Florida Marlins	22	2.63	180	
2006	Johan Santana (2) ^{‡}	Minnesota Twins	19	2.77	245	
2007	CC Sabathia ^{†‡}	Cleveland Indians	19	3.21	209	
2008	CC Sabathia (2) ^{†}	Cleveland Indians / Milwaukee Brewers	17	2.70	251	
2009	CC Sabathia (3) ^{†}	New York Yankees	19	3.37	197	
2010	David Price	Tampa Bay Rays	19	2.72	188	
2011	Clayton Kershaw ^{‡}	Los Angeles Dodgers	21	2.28	248	
2012	Gio Gonzalez	Washington Nationals	21	2.89	207	
2013	Clayton Kershaw (2) ^{‡}	Los Angeles Dodgers	16	1.83	232	
2014	Clayton Kershaw (3) ^{‡}	Los Angeles Dodgers	21	1.77	239	
2015	Dallas Keuchel ^{‡}	Houston Astros	20	2.48	216	
2016	Jon Lester	Chicago Cubs	19	2.44	197	
2017	Clayton Kershaw (4)	Los Angeles Dodgers	18	2.31	202	
2018	Blake Snell ^{‡}	Tampa Bay Rays	21	1.89	221	
2019	Patrick Corbin	Washington Nationals	14	3.25	238	
2020	Hyun-jin Ryu	Toronto Blue Jays	5	2.69	72	
2021	Julio Urías	Los Angeles Dodgers	20	2.96	195	
2022	Julio Urías (2)	Los Angeles Dodgers	17	2.16	166	
2023	Blake Snell (2) ^{‡}	San Diego Padres	14	2.25	234	
2024	Chris Sale	Atlanta Braves	18	2.38	225	
2025	Tarik Skubal ^{‡}	Detroit Tigers	13	2.21	241	

== See also ==
- Baseball awards
