= 1916 Canton Bulldogs season =

American football team season

- Head coach: Jim Thorpe
- Home stadium: League Field

Results
- Record: 9-0-1
- League place: 1st

The 1916 Canton Bulldogs season was their eighth season in the Ohio League. The team finished 9-0-1 to clinch their first sole league title.

== Schedule ==
| Game | Date | Opponent | Result |
|---|---|---|---|
| 1 | October 1, 1916 | Altoona Indians | W 23-0 |
| 2 | October 8, 1916 | Pitcairn Quakers | W 7-0 |
| 3 | October 15, 1916 | Buffalo All-Stars | W 77-0 |
| 4 | October 22, 1916 | New York All-Stars | W 68-0 |
| 5 | October 30, 1916 | Columbus Panhandles | W 12-0 |
| 6 | November 5, 1916 | Cleveland Indians | W 27-0 |
| 7 | November 12, 1916 | at Cleveland Indians | W 14-7 |
| 8 | November 19, 1916 | at Youngstown Patricians | W 6-0 |
| 9 | November 26, 1916 | at Massillon Tigers | T 0-0 |
| 10 | December 2, 1916 | Massillon Tigers | W 24-0 |

== Top Ohio League team consensus standings ==
Ohio League
| | W | L | T |
|---|---|---|---|
| Canton Bulldogs | 9 | 0 | 1 |
| Massillon Tigers | 7 | 1 | 2 |
| Cleveland Indians | 8 | 3 | 1 |
| Dayton Triangles | 9 | 1 | 0 |
| Toledo Maroons | 7 | 3 | 1 |
| Columbus Panhandles | 7 | 5 | 0 |
| Youngstown Patricians | 7 | 4 | 0 |
| Cincinnati Celts | 5 | 4 | 1 |
