= 1917 Massillon Tigers season =

American football team season

- Head coach: Bob Nash, Charles Brickley
- Home stadium: Hospital Grounds Stadium

Results
- Record: 5–3

The 1917 All-Massillons football season was their eighth season in existence. It would be their last season until 1919, since the Tigers 1918 season was cancelled due to the outbreak of World War I and the Spanish flu pandemic.

The Tigers posted a 5–3 record in 1917.

== Schedule ==
Game	Date	Opponent	Result	Record
1	October 14	Buffalo All-Stars	W 14–6	1–0
2	October 21	Pitcairn Quakers	W 27–0	2–0
3	October 28	at Akron Indians	W 14–0	3–0
4	November 4	Columbus Panhandles	W 28–0	4–0
5	November 11	at Youngstown Patricians	L 6–14	4–1
6	November 18	Akron Indians	L 0–3	4–2
7	November 25	at Canton Bulldogs	L 3–14	4–3
8	December 2	at Canton Bulldogs	W 16–0	5–3
