= 1916 Dayton Triangles season =

American football team season

- Head coach: Bud Talbott
- Home stadium: Triangle Park

Results
- Record: 9-1

The 1916 Dayton Triangles season was their fourth season in the Ohio League, and the first under the name, "Triangles". The team posted a 9–1 record.

== Schedule ==
Game	Date	Opponent	Result
1	October 1, 1916	Cincinnati Northerns	W 72-0
2	October 8, 1916	Wellston	W 67-0
3	October 15, 1916	Elyria Andwurs	W 25-0
4	October 22, 1916	at Detroit Heralds	W 14-7
5	October 29, 1916	Altoona Indians	W 33-0
6	November 5, 1916	Pitcairn Quakers	W 7-3
7	November 12, 1916	at Toledo Maroons	W 12-0
8	November 19, 1916	Cincinnati Celts	W 6-0
9	November 26, 1916	at Cincinnati Celts	L 10-7
10	November 30, 1916	Pitcairn Quakers	W 20-9
