= 1917 Buffalo All-Stars season =

American football team season

- General manager: Eugene F. Dooley
- Head coach: Barney Lepper
- Home stadium: Buffalo Baseball Park

Results
- Record: 4–6–2

The 1917 Buffalo All-Stars team (or just "All-Buffalo" as they were known in local papers) played in the New York Pro Football League and would go on to post a 4–6–2 record.

Three of the losses came at the hands of either Ohio League and/or future National Football League teams from outside the state of New York.

The highlight of the season included two indoor games played against the 74th Regiment, NYNG infantry football team at the 74th armory over Christmas week. The regiment, stationed at Camp Wadsworth in Spartanburg, SC, was home for the holidays. Proceeds of the two games were given to the soldiers to off-set travel expenses.

Eugene F. Dooley played quarterback and also managed the team.

== Schedule ==
Game	Date	Opponent	Result	Record
1	September 29	Rochester College Stars	W 21–6	1–0
2	October 7	All-Niagara	W 30–0	2–0
3	October 14	at Massillon Tigers	L 6–14	2–1
4	October 21	at Detroit Heralds	L 0–67	2–2
5	October 28	All-Tonawanda All-Stars	T 0–0	2–2–1
6	November 4	at Akron Indians	L 7–7	2–3–1
7	November 10	Fort Niagara	L 0–20	2–4–1
8	November 11	Jamestown, New York	W 34–12	3–4–1
9	November 25 (Note: Regional semifinal.)	at All-Tonawanda All-Stars	L 0–16	3–5–1
10	December 1	Camp Dix 309th Infantry	L 0–2	3–6–1
11	December 25 (Note: Game played indoors at 74th Armory.)	at 74th Infantry (Fort Porter)	T 7–7	3–6–2
12	December 29 (Note: Game played indoors at 74th Armory.)	at 74th Infantry	W 21–0	4–6–2
