= 1917 Canton Bulldogs season =

American football team season

- Head coach: Jim Thorpe
- Home stadium: League Field

Results
- Record: 9–1
- League place: 1st

The 1917 Canton Bulldogs season was their eleventh season in the Ohio League. The team finished with a 9–1 record and captured their third Ohio League championship.

== Schedule ==
Game	Date	Opponent	Result
1	October 7, 1917	Pitcairn Quakers	W 12–7
2	October 14, 1917	Altoona Indians	W 80–0
3	October 21, 1917	Columbus Panhandles	W 54–0
4	October 28, 1917	Rochester Jeffersons	W 41–0
5	November 4, 1917	at Youngstown Patricians	W 3–0
6	November 11, 1917	at Akron Indians	W 14–0
7	November 18, 1917	Youngstown Patricians	W 13–0
8	November 25, 1917	Massillon Tigers	W 14–3
9	November 29, 1917	at Detroit Heralds	W 7–0
10	December 2, 1917	Massillon Tigers	L 6–0
