= 1917 Columbus Panhandles season =

American football team season

- Head coach: Joseph F. Carr
- Home stadium: Traveling team

Results
- Record: 3–6

The 1917 Columbus Panhandles season was their 12th season in existence. The team played in the Ohio League posted a 3–6 record.

== Schedule ==
Game	Date	Opponent	Result
1	September 30, 1917	at Newark Stars	W 14-6
2	October 7, 1917	at Lancaster Independents	W 38-0
3	October 14, 1917	at Akron Indians	L 3-0
4	October 21, 1917	at Canton Bulldogs	L 54-3
5	October 28, 1917	at Youngstown Patricians	L 30-0
6	November 4, 1917	at Massillon Tigers	L 28-0
7	November 11, 1917	at Toledo Maroons	W 13-0
8	November 18, 1917	at Fort Wayne Friars	L 13-0
9	November 25, 1917	at Detroit Heralds	L 23-0
10	November 29, 1917	at Pine Village, Indiana	Canceled
11	December 9, 1917	Canton Bulldogs	Canceled
