= 1916 Buffalo All-Stars season =

American football team season

- General manager: Eugene F. Dooley
- Head coach: Floyd
- Home stadium: Ryan's Park

Results
- Record: 7–3–1
- Division place: No divisions
- Playoffs: No playoffs

The 1916 Buffalo All-Stars (or just "All-Buffalo" as they were known in local papers) played in the Buffalo Semi Pro Football division which was considered part of the New York Pro Football League and posted a 7–3–1 record.

Eugene F. Dooley played quarterback and also managed the team.

== Schedule ==
Game	Date	Opponent	Result	Record
1	October 1	Tonawanda Frontiers	W 7–0	1–0
2	October 8	at Toledo Maroons	L 0–15	1–1
3	October 15	at Canton Bulldogs	L 0–77	1–2
4	October 22	Jewish Young Men's Association	W 6–0	2–2
5	October 29	All-Tonawanda	W 6–0	3–2
6	November 5	All-Lancaster	T 0–0	3–2–1
7	November 12	Buffalo High School All-Stars	W 20–0	4–2–1
8	November 19	at All-Tonawanda	L 0–3	4–3–1
9	November 26	All-Tonawanda	W 6–0	5–3–1
10	November 30	All-Lancaster	W 13–0	6–3–1
11	December 3	Rochester Jeffersons (Note: The outcome of the game was disputed as the Rochester team considered the Buffalo onside kick and subsequent score illegal. Rochester claimed a 6–0 victory over Buffalo and the state title.)	W 7–6	7–3–1
