= 1916 Massillon Tigers season =

American football team season

- Head coach: Bob Nash
- Home stadium: Hospital Grounds Stadium

Results
- Record: 7–1–2

The 1916 Massillon Tigers football season was their seventh season in existence. The team posted a 7–1–2 record in 1916.

== Schedule ==
Game	Date	Opponent	Result	Record
1	October 8	Elyria Andwurs	W 31–0	1–0
2	October 15	Altoona Indians	W 54–0	2–0
3	October 22	Toledo Maroons	W 15–7	3–0
4	October 29	at Detroit Heralds	W 6–0	4–0
5	November 5	at Youngstown Patricians	W 3–0	5–0
6	November 12	Columbus Panhandles	W 10–0	6–0
7	November 19	at Cleveland Indians	T 0–0	6–0–1
8	November 26	at Canton Bulldogs	T 0–0	6–0–2
9	November 30	Youngstown Patricians	W 27–0	7–0–2
10	December 3	Canton Bulldogs	L 0–24	7–1–2
