= 1916 Detroit Heralds season =

American football team season

- Head coach: Bill Marshall
- Home stadium: Navin Field

Results
- Record: 6–4

The 1916 Detroit Heralds season was the 12th season for the Detroit Heralds, an independent American football team. Led by coach Bill Marshall, the team compiled a 6–4 record.

== Schedule ==
Date	Opponent	Site	Result	Attendance	Source
October 1	Ex-Carlisle Indians	Navin Field; Detroit	W 12–0		
October 8	Cincinnati Celts	Navin Field; Detroit	W 17–0		
October 15	Columbus Panhandles	Navin Field; Detroit	L 7–13		
October 22	Dayton Triangles	Navin Field; Detroit	L 7–14		
October 29	Massillon Tigers	Navin Field; Detroit	L 0–6		
November 5	Evanston North Ends	Navin Field; Detroit	W 21–9		
November 12	Pittsburgh/Pitcairn Quakers	Navin Field; Detroit	W 15–0		
November 19	Columbus Panhandles	Navin Field; Detroit	L 0–15		
November 26	Akron Burkhardts	Navin Field; Detroit	W 13–7		
December 3	Harvards	Navin Field; Detroit	W 50–0		

== Players ==
- Vernon Castle - fullback
- Collins - tackle
- Cornwall - guard
- Pat Dunne - fullback/halfback
- Edgerton - tackle
- Gardener - end
- Norm "Tango" Glockson - guard/end
- Lambert - quarterback
- Latham - quarterback
- "Nig" Lenahan - halfback
- Birtie Maher - end/halfback
- Blake Miller - end
- Mitchell - guard
- Danny Mullane - end/halfback
- Nowashe - guard
- Ruben - end
- Norb Sacksteder - halfback
- H. Schlee - tackle/guard
- Schultz - end/halfback/fullback/tackle
- G. Shields - tackle
- R. "Dick" Shields - quarterback/end and captain
- Archie "Dutch" Stewart - center
- Strait - guard
- Tucker - halfback
- Perce Wilson - halfback/quarterback
