= National Native American Hall of Fame =

- Established: 2016
- Location: Great Falls, Montana, and Oklahoma City, Oklahoma, United States
- Directors: James Parker Shield, CEO
- Website: nativehalloffame.org

The National Native American Hall of Fame, established in 2016 in Great Falls, Montana, with a working facility in Oklahoma City, Oklahoma, has the mission of 'honoring Native American achievements in contemporary society 1860's – present day', and was founded by Little Shell Chippewa James Parker Shield who is chief executive officer after being Montana's State Coordinator of Indian Affairs as the first Native American in the staff of the Montana Governor's office. Founding partners include native polities the Navajo Nation, Yocha Dehe Wintun Nation, Chickasaw Nation and amici cultura the NoVo Foundation of Jennifer and Peter Buffett, daughter in law and son of Warren Buffett, and the TIDES Foundation founded by Drummond Pike.

As of 2023 the president of the board of directors of the National Native American Hall of Fame, whose directors span US native peoples coast to coast is San Pasqual Band of Mission Indians Kumeyaay Frances Alvarez.

As of winter 2023–4, the National Native American Hall of Fame's objectives are:

1. Conduct Annual Induction Ceremonies
2. Pursue development of a facility to be the home of the Hall of Fame
3. Develop a traveling exhibit
4. Develop a Hall of Fame education curriculum.

Partner: the First Americans Museum in Oklahoma City announced in 2021 a collaboration with the National Native American Hall of Fame in developing a permanent Hall of Fame home facility.

== Induction ==
Annual inductions are in November, National American Indian Heritage Month in the United States of America, and were inaugurated in 2018.

=== 2025 Inductees ===
- W. Ron Allen, Jamestown S’Klallam Tribe - Government
- Ross Anderson, Cheyenne & Arapaho Tribes and Mescalero / Chiricahua Apache - Athletics
- Notah Begay III, Navajo - Athletics
- Dwight Birdwell, Cherokee Nation of Oklahoma - Military
- Deb Haaland, Laguna Pueblo - Government
- Lynn Valbuena, Yuhaaviatam of San Manuel Nation - Government

=== 2024 Inductees ===
- Stanley Crooks, Shakopee Mdewakanton Sioux - Government
- Franklin Ducheneaux, Cheyenne River Sioux - Law
- Veronica Lee Homer, Colorado River Indian Tribes - Advocacy
- Julie Kitka, Chugach - Advocacy
- Henrietta Mann, Southern Cheyenne - Education
- Te Ata, Chickasaw Nation - Arts

=== 2023 inductees ===
- Joe DeLaCruz, Quinalt Indian Nation – Government
- Will Sampson, Muscogee Creek – Entertainment
- Leslie Silko, Laguna Pueblo – Writing
- Mark Trahant, Shoshone-Bannock – Journalism
- Richard Trudell, Santee Sioux Nation – Law
- LaNada War Jack, Shoshone-Bannock – Advocacy

=== 2022 inductees ===
- Bill Anoatubby, Chickasaw Nation – Government
- Ryneldi Becenti, Navajo – Athletics
- John EchoHawk, Pawnee – Law
- Tim Giago, Oglala Lakota – Journalism
- Suzan Shown Harjo, S. Cheyenne & Hodulgee Muscogee – Advocacy
- Marshall McKay, Yocha Dehe Wintun Nation – Government
- Earl Old Person Sr., Blackfeet Nation – Government
- Joanne Shenandoah, Oneida – Entertainment
- Patricia Zell, Arapaho/Navajo – Law

=== 2021 inductees ===
- Dave Anderson, Choctaw / Lac Courte Oreilles Ojibwe – Business
- Ben Nighthorse Campbell, Northern Cheyenne – Government
- Joy Harjo, Muscogee (Creek) Nation – Writing
- Marcella LeBeau, Cheyenne River Sioux – Medicine
- Emil Notti, Athabascan – Advocacy
- Katherine Siva Saubel, Morongo Band of Mission Indians – Culture
- Ernie Stevens Sr., Oneida – Government
- W. Richard West, Cheyenne / Arapaho Tribes – Arts

=== 2019 inductees ===
- Lucy Covington, Colville Tribes – Advocacy
- Ada Deer, Menominee – Advocacy
- Louise Erdrich, Turtle Mountain Chippewa – Writing
- Billy Frank Jr., Nisqually Tribe – Advocacy
- Forrest Gerard, Blackfeet Nation – Government
- Hattie Kauffman, Nez Perce Tribe – Journalism
- Oren Lyons, Onondaga Nation – Spiritual
- Richard Oakes, Mohawk Nation – Advocacy
- Elizabeth Peratrovich, Tlingit Nation – Advocacy
- Pascal Poolaw, Kiowa Tribe – Military
- Mary Golda Ross, Cherokee Nation – Science
- Wes Studi, Cherokee Nation – Arts

=== 2018 inductees ===
- Lionel Bordeaux, Rosebud Sioux – Education
- Elouise P. Cobell, Blackfeet Nation – Advocacy
- Vine Deloria Jr., Standing Rock Sioux – Writing
- LaDonna Harris, Comanche Nation – Advocacy
- John Herrington, Chickasaw Nation – Science
- Allan Houser/Haozous, Chiricahua Apache – Arts
- Wilma Mankiller, Cherokee Nation – Government
- Billy Mills, Oglala Lakota Sioux – Athletics
- N. Scott Momaday, Kiowa Tribe – Writing
- Lori Piestewa, Hopi Tribe – Military
- Maria Tallchief, Osage Nation – Arts
- Jim Thorpe, Sac and Fox Nation – Athletics

== See also ==
- National Hall of Fame for Famous American Indians
- National American Indian Heritage Month
- Native American Day
