= 1916 Akron Burkhardts season =

American football team season

1916 Akron Indians season
- Head coach: Ralph Waldsmith

Results
- Record: 7-4-2
- Division place: No divisions
- Playoffs: No playoffs

The 1916 Akron Burkhardts season was their ninth season in existence. The team played in the Ohio League and posted a 7–4–2 record. Their head coach was Ralph Waldsmith.

== Schedule ==
The table below was compiled using the information from The Pro Football Archives. The winning teams score is listed first. If a cell is greyed out and has "N/A", then that means there is an unknown figure for that game. Green-colored rows indicate a win; yellow-colored rows indicate a tie; and red-colored rows indicate a loss.

Week	Date	Opponent	Result	Record	Venue	Attendance
1	September 24	at Massillon Blues	T 0–0	0–0–1	—	—
2	October 1	Cleveland Indians	L 0–3	0–1–1	Lakeside Park	2,000
3	October 8	Lorain Franklins	W 13–0	1–1–1	Lakeside Park	—
4	October 15	Barberton Pros	T 3–3	1–1–2	Lakeside Park	2,000
5	October 22	vs. Struthers	W 47–0	2–1–2	Lakeside Park	—
6	October 29	at Cleveland Indians	L 0–13	2–2–2	League Park	4,000
7	November 5	Akron Imperial Electrics	W 6–0	3–2–2	Lakeside Park	2,500
8	November 12	at Barberton Pros	L 0–10	3–3–2	Eagles Ball Park	2,500
9	November 19	Elyria Andwurs	W 3–0	4–3–2	Lakeside Park	—
10	November 26	at Detroit Heralds	L 7–13	4–4–2	Navin Field	—
11	November 30	Barberton Pros	W 6–0	5–4–2	Lakeside Park	—
12	December 3	Akron Indians	W 27–0	6–4–2	Lakeside Park	2,500
13	December 10	at Barberton Pros	W 7–0	7–4–2	Eagles Ball Park	1,000
