= 1916 Columbus Panhandles season =

American football team season

- Head coach: Joseph F. Carr
- Home stadium: Traveling Team

Results
- Record: 7-5-0

The 1916 Columbus Panhandles season was their 11th season in existence. The team played in the Ohio League and posted a 7-5-0 record.

== Schedule ==
Game	Date	Opponent	Result
1	October 1, 1916	at Lancaster Independents	W 69–0
2	October 8, 1916	at Marion Questions	W 54–0
3	October 15, 1916	at Detroit Heralds	W 13–7
4	October 22, 1916	at Cleveland Indians	W 9–6
5	October 29, 1916	at Canton Bulldogs	L 12–0
6	November 5, 1916	Toledo Maroons	L 23–7
7	November 12, 1916	at Massillon Tigers	L 10–0
8	November 19, 1916	at Detroit Heralds	W 15–0
9	November 26, 1916	at Cleveland Indians	L 7–0
10	November 30, 1916	at Fort Wayne Friars	L 3–0
11	December 3, 1916	at Youngstown Patricians	W 13–0
12	December 10, 1916	at Columbus All-Stars	W 6–0
