= Statue of Jim Thorpe =

Statue in Oklahoma City, Oklahoma, U.S.

- The statue in 2019
- Subject: Jim Thorpe
- Location: Oklahoma City, Oklahoma, U.S.; 35.465743°N 97.508671°W

The statue of Jim Thorpe is installed outside the Oklahoma Sports Hall of Fame, next to Oklahoma City's Chickasaw Bricktown Ballpark, in the U.S. state of Oklahoma.
