= 1917 Detroit Heralds season =

Sports season

- Head coach: Bill Marshall
- Home stadium: Navin Field

Results
- Record: 8–2

The 1917 Detroit Heralds season was the 13th season for the Detroit Heralds, an independent American football team. Led by coach Bill Marshall, the team compiled an 8–2 record.

Tommy Hughitt, Norb Sacksteder, and Birtie Maher starred for the Heralds. Frank Nesser joined the team in late November.

== Schedule ==
Date	Opponent	Site	Result	Attendance	Source
October 7	Hammond	Navin Field; Detroit	W 19–0	1,000	
October 14	Cincinnati Celts	Navin Field; Detroit	W 14–0		
October 21	All-Buffalo	Navin Field; Detroit	W 67–0		
October 28	Toledo Maroons	Navin Field; Detroit	W 20–7		
November 4	Wabash	Navin Field; Detroit	W 34–0		
November 11	Camp Custer	Navin Field; Detroit	L 0–13	15,000	
November 18	Racine	Navin Field; Detroit	W 19–0		
November 25	Columbus Panhandles	Navin Field; Detroit	W		
November 29	Canton Bulldogs	Detroit	L 0–7		
December 2	at Toledo Maroons	Toledo, OH	W 23–0		

== Players ==
- Booth, halfback
- Pat Dunne, fullback
- Edgerton, tackle
- Steamer Horning, tackle
- Tommy Hughitt, quarterback (only appeared in early season games)
- "Nig" Lenahan, halfback/fullback
- Birtie Maher, halfback/end
- Marider, guard
- Danny Mullane, end
- Norb Sacksteder, halfback
- Schlee, guard/tackle
- Shanks, tackle
- G. Shields, guard
- Archie "Dutch" Stewart, center and captain
- Straight, guard
- Carl Thiele, end/tackle
- Lou Usher, center/guard/tackle
- Weekes, quarterback (possibly "Hub" Weekes)
- Whipple, end
- Whitaker/Whittaker, quarterback
- Perce Wilson, halfback/quarterback
- Windbiel, guard/tackle
- Witherbein, tackle
