= Jim Thorpe =

American athlete (1887–1953)

- Wa-Tho-Huk
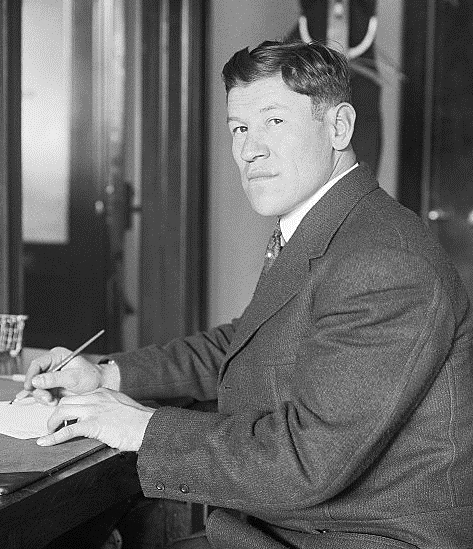
- Thorpe in 1913
- Born: James Francis Thorpe; May 22 or 28, 1887; Near Prague, Oklahoma, U.S. (Note: Then part of Indian Territory)
- Died: March 28, 1953 (aged 65); Lomita, California, U.S.
- Football career
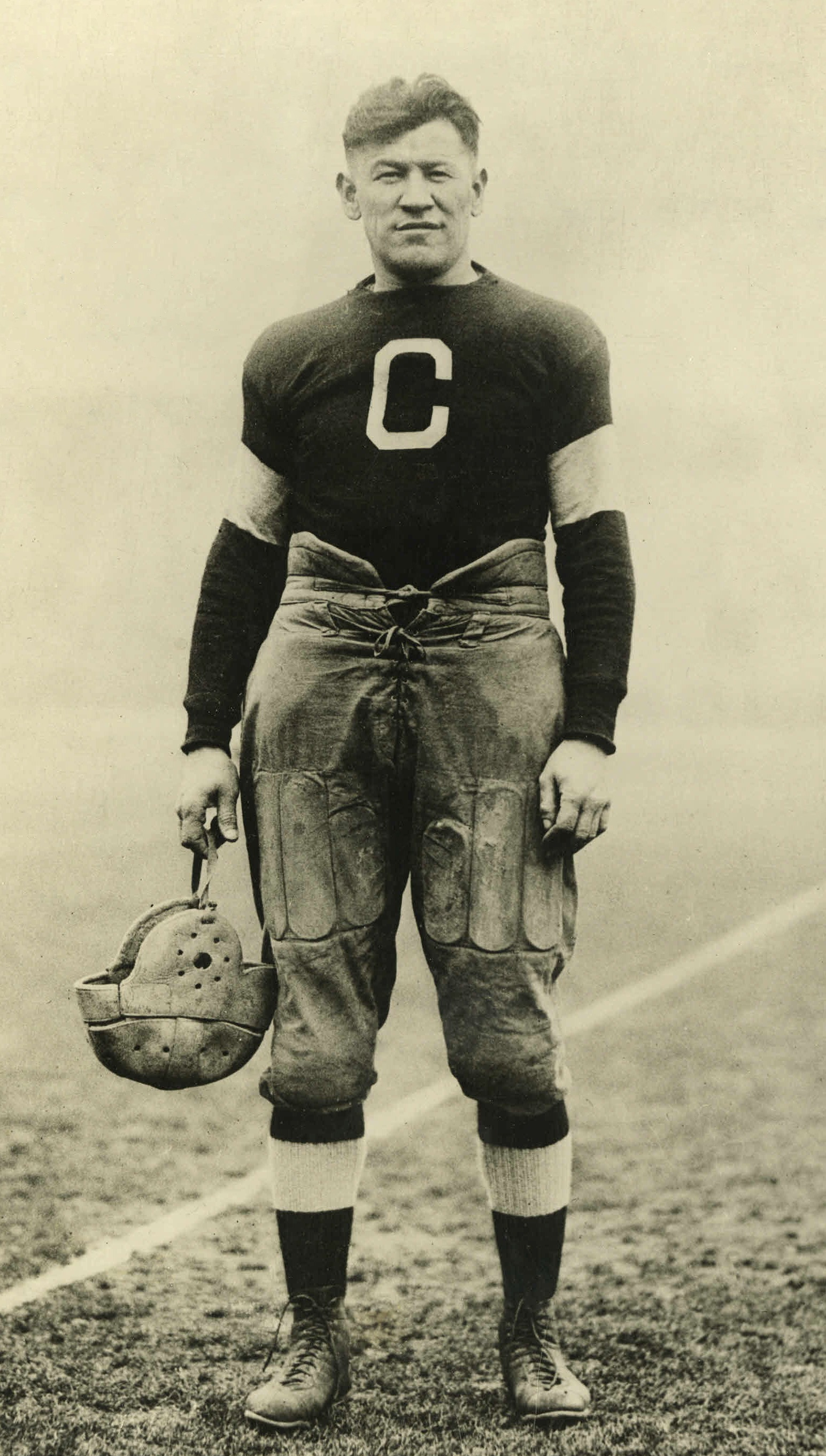
- Thorpe with the Canton Bulldogs, c. 1915 – c. 1920

No. 2, 21, 3, 20, 1
- Position: Tailback

Personal information
- Listed height: 6 ft 1 in (1.85 m)
- Listed weight: 202 lb (92 kg)

Career information
- High school: Carlisle Indian Industrial (Carlisle, Pennsylvania)
- College: Carlisle (1907–1908, 1911–1912)

Career history

Playing
- Pine Village Villagers (1915); Canton Bulldogs (1915–1917, 1919–1920); Cleveland Indians (1921); Oorang Indians (1922–1923); Rock Island Independents (1924); New York Giants (1925); Rock Island Independents (1925); Tampa Cardinals (1926); Canton Bulldogs (1926); Portsmouth Shoe-Steels (1927); Chicago Cardinals (1928)

Coaching
- Indiana (1915) Assistant coach; Canton Bulldogs (1915–1920) Head coach; Cleveland Indians (1921) Head coach; Oorang Indians (1922–1923) Head coach; Tampa Cardinals (1926) Head coach; Portsmouth Shoe-Steels (1927) Head coach

Operations
- Oorang Indians (1922–1923) General manager; Tampa Cardinals (1926) Owner & general manager

Awards and highlights
- As a player: 3× Ohio League champion (1916, 1917, 1919); First-team All-Pro (1923); NFL 1920s All-Decade Team; NFL 50th Anniversary All-Time Team; 2× Consensus All-American (1911, 1912); Third-team All-American (1908); Carlisle Indians All-Time Team; FWAA Early Era All-America Team; Walter Camp All-Time All-American (Note: Selected as a defensive back.); As a coach: 3× Ohio League champion (1916, 1917, 1919)

Career NFL statistics
- Games played: 52
- Games started: 37
- Field goals: 4
- Longest field goal: 47
- Rushing touchdowns: 6
- Points scored: 51
- Stats at Pro Football Reference

Head coaching record
- Career: NFL: 14–25–2 (.366); Ohio League: 32–3–2 (.892); Overall: 46–28–4 (.615)
- Coaching profile at Pro Football Reference
- Pro Football Hall of Fame
- College Football Hall of Fame
- Baseball career
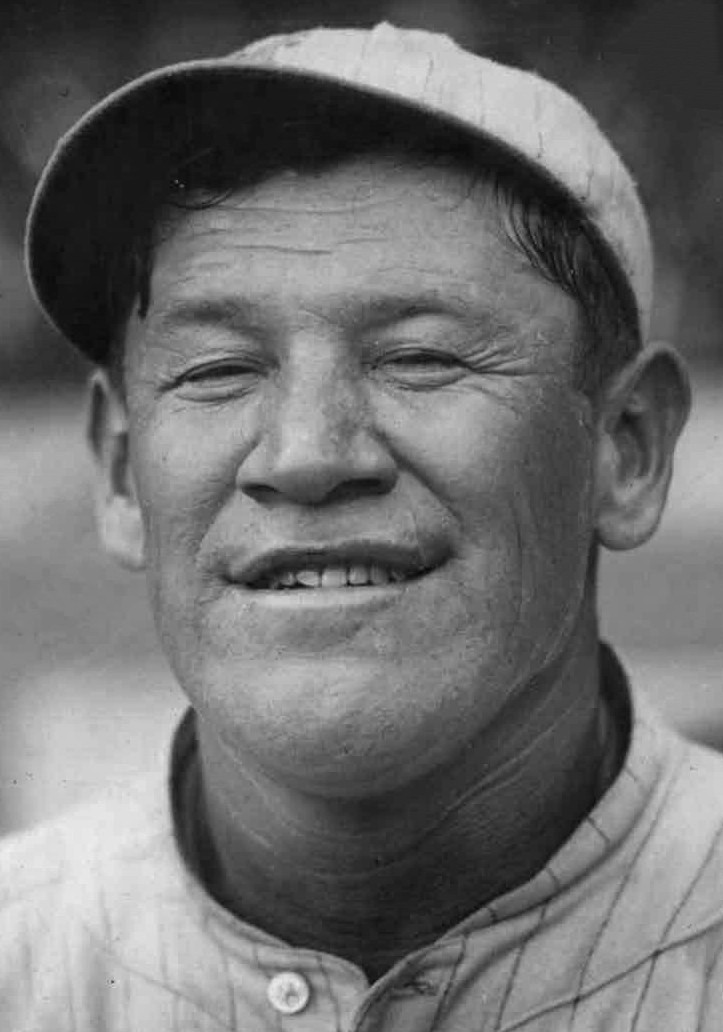
- Thorpe with the New York Giants
- Outfielder
- Batted: Right Threw: Right

MLB debut
- April 14, 1913, for the New York Giants

Last MLB appearance
- September 25, 1919, for the Boston Braves

MLB statistics
- Batting average: .252
- Home runs: 7
- RBI: 82
- Hits: 176
- Stats at Baseball Reference

Teams
- New York Giants (1913–1915, 1917); Cincinnati Reds (1917); New York Giants (1918–1919); Boston Braves (1919)

1st President of the NFL
- In office 1920–1921
- Preceded by: Ralph Hay (Note: He served as the NFL temporary secretary.)
- Succeeded by: Joseph Carr

Olympic medal record

Men's athletics

Representing the United States
Gold medal – first place	1912 Stockholm	Decathlon
Gold medal – first place	1912 Stockholm	Pentathlon

James Francis Thorpe (Meskwaki: Wa-Tho-Huk; May 22 or 28, 1887 – March 28, 1953) was an American athlete who won Olympic gold medals and played professional football, baseball, and basketball. A citizen of the Sac and Fox Nation, he was the first Native American to win a gold medal for the United States in the Olympics. Considered one of the most versatile athletes of modern sports, Thorpe won two Olympic gold medals in the 1912 Summer Olympics (one in classic pentathlon and the other in decathlon).

Thorpe lost his Olympic titles after it was found he had been paid for playing two seasons of semi-professional baseball before competing in the Olympics, thus violating the contemporary amateurism rules. In 1983, 30 years after his death, the International Olympic Committee (IOC) restored Thorpe's Olympic medals with replicas, after ruling that the decision to strip him of his medals fell outside of the required 30 days. Official IOC records still listed Thorpe as co-champion in the decathlon and pentathlon until 2022, when it was decided to restore him as the sole champion in both events.

Thorpe grew up in the Sac and Fox Nation in Indian Territory (what is now the U.S. state of Oklahoma). As a youth, he attended Carlisle Indian Industrial School in Carlisle, Pennsylvania, where he was a three-time All-American for the school's football team under coach Pop Warner. After his Olympic success in 1912, which included a record score in the decathlon, Thorpe added a victory in the All-Around Championship of the Amateur Athletic Union. In 1913, Thorpe signed with the New York Giants, and played six seasons in Major League Baseball between 1913 and 1919. Thorpe joined the Canton Bulldogs American football team in 1915, helping them win three professional championships. He later played for six teams in the National Football League (NFL). Thorpe played as part of several all-American Indian teams throughout his career, and barnstormed as a professional basketball player with a team composed entirely of American Indians.

From 1920 to 1921, Thorpe was nominally the first president of the American Professional Football Association, which became the NFL in 1922. He played professional sports until age 41, the end of his sports career coinciding with the start of the Great Depression. Thorpe struggled to earn a living after that, working several odd jobs. He suffered from alcoholism and lived his last years in failing health and poverty. Thorpe was married three times and had eight children – including Grace Thorpe, an environmentalist and Native rights activist – before suffering from heart failure and dying in 1953.

Thorpe has received numerous accolades for his athletic accomplishments. The Associated Press ranked him as the "greatest athlete" from the first 50 years of the 20th century, and the Pro Football Hall of Fame inducted Thorpe as part of its inaugural class in 1963. The town of Jim Thorpe, Pennsylvania, was named in his honor. It has a monument site that contains his remains, which were the subject of legal action. Thorpe appeared in several films and was portrayed by Burt Lancaster in the 1951 film Jim Thorpe – All-American.

== Early life ==
Information about Thorpe's birth, name, and ethnic background varies widely. He was baptized "Jacobus Franciscus Thorpe" in the Catholic Church. Thorpe was born in Indian Territory of the United States (later Oklahoma), but no birth certificate has been found. The Jim Thorpe Museum lists his birth date as May 28, 1887, but others have listed it as May 22, 1887, near the town of Prague. Thorpe said in a note to The Shawnee News-Star in 1943 that he was born May 28, 1888, "near and south of Bellemont – Pottawatomie County – along the banks of the North Fork River ... hope this will clear up the inquiries as to my birthplace." May 22, 1887, is listed on his baptismal certificate. Thorpe referred to Shawnee as his birthplace in his 1943 note to the newspaper.

Thorpe's father, Hiram Thorpe (Sac and Fox), had an Irish father and a Sac and Fox mother. His mother, Charlotte Vieux, was the daughter of Citizen Potawatomi Nation members Elizabeth and Jacob Vieux, and was a descendant of Chief Louis Vieux.

Thorpe was raised in the Sauk, or Thâkîwaki, culture, and his Sauk name was Wa-Tho-Huk, which translates as "Bright path the lightning makes as it goes across the sky", often shortened to "Bright Path". Thorpe's parents were both Roman Catholic, a faith which Thorpe observed throughout his adult life.

Thorpe attended the Sac and Fox Indian Agency School in Stroud, with his twin brother, Charlie. Charlie helped him through school until he died of pneumonia when they were nine years old. Thorpe ran away from school several times. His father sent him to the Haskell Institute, an Indian boarding school in Lawrence, Kansas, so that Thorpe would not run away again.

When Thorpe's mother died of childbirth complications two years later, he became depressed. After several arguments with his father, Thorpe left home to work on a horse ranch.

In 1904, the 16-year-old Thorpe returned to his father and decided to attend Carlisle Indian Industrial School in Carlisle, Pennsylvania. There his athletic ability was recognized and he was coached by Glenn Scobey "Pop" Warner, one of the most influential coaches of early American football history. Later that year he was orphaned when his father Hiram Thorpe died from gangrene poisoning, after being wounded in a hunting accident. The young Thorpe again dropped out of school. He resumed farm work for a few years before returning to Carlisle School.

== Amateur career ==
=== College career ===
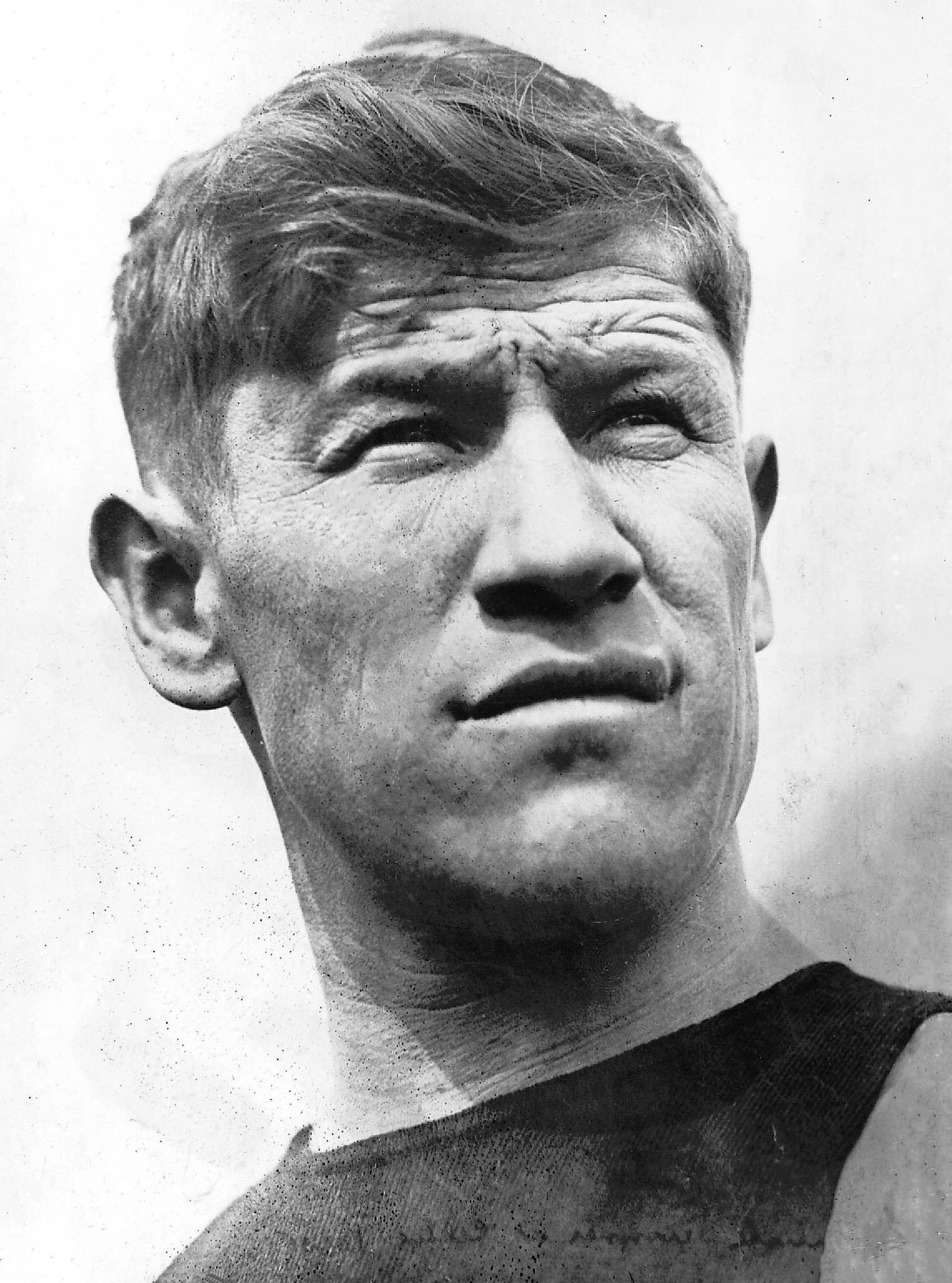
Thorpe in 1912

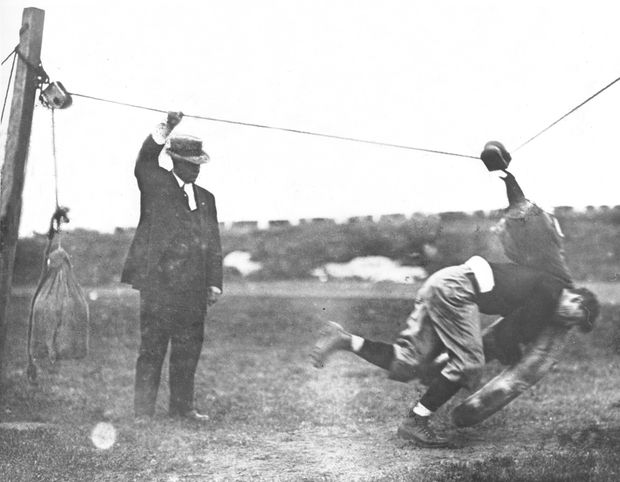
Thorpe tackling a dummy that is made of weights and pulley on wire, with Coach Warner, 1912

Thorpe began his athletic career at Carlisle in 1907 when he walked past the track and, still in street clothes, beat all the school's high jumpers with an impromptu 5-ft 9-in jump that broke the school record.

He also competed in football, baseball, lacrosse, tennis, boxing, handball, and ballroom dancing, winning the 1912 intercollegiate ballroom dancing championship.

Thorpe made his college football debut for Carlisle on September 22, 1907, against Lebanon Valley, coming off the bench to score two touchdowns in a 40–0 victory. In his second collegiate game, on September 28, 1907, Thorpe again entered as a substitute during Carlisle's win over Villanova. He made his first career start the next game on October 2, 1907, versus Susquehanna, where he scored four touchdowns.

Pop Warner was hesitant to allow Thorpe, his best track and field athlete, to compete in such a physical game as football. Thorpe, however, convinced Warner to let him try some rushing plays in practice against the school team's defense; Warner assumed he would be tackled easily and give up the idea. Thorpe "ran around past and through them not once, but twice". He walked over to Warner and said, "Nobody is going to tackle Jim", while flipping him the ball.

Thorpe first gained nationwide notice in 1911 for his athletic ability. As a running back, defensive back, placekicker and punter, Thorpe scored all of his team's four field goals in an 18–15 upset of Harvard, a top-ranked team in the early days of the National Collegiate Athletic Association (NCAA). He also rushed for 173 yards in the game, and afterwards Harvard did not lose again until 1915. Carlisle would go on to finish the 1911 season with an 11–1 record and were retroactively named national collegiate champions in a book titled "Champions of College Football", written by Bill Libby in 1975. In 1912, Thorpe led the nation with 29 touchdowns and 224 points scored during the season, according to the College Football Hall of Fame. Steve Boda, a researcher for the NCAA, credits Thorpe with 27 touchdowns and 224 points. Thorpe rushed 191 times for 1,869 yards, according to Boda; the figures do not include statistics from two of Carlisle's 14 games in 1912 because full records are not available.

Carlisle's 1912 record included a 27–6 victory over the West Point Army team. In that game, Thorpe's 92-yard touchdown was nullified by a teammate's penalty, but on the next play Thorpe rushed for a 97-yard touchdown. Future President Dwight D. Eisenhower, who played against him in that game, recalled of Thorpe in a 1961 speech:

Here and there, there are some people who are supremely endowed. My memory goes back to Jim Thorpe. He never practiced in his life, and he could do anything better than any other football player I ever saw.

Thorpe was a third-team All-American in 1908 and a first-team All-American in 1911 and 1912. Football was – and remained – Thorpe's favorite sport. He did not compete in track and field in 1910 or 1911, although this turned out to be the sport in which he gained his greatest fame.

In the spring of 1912, he started training for the Olympics. He had confined his efforts to jumps, hurdles and shot-puts, but now added pole vaulting, javelin, discus, hammer and 56 lb weight. In the Olympic trials held at Celtic Park in New York, his all-round ability stood out in all these events and so he earned a place on the team that went to Sweden.

The poet Marianne Moore, who taught Thorpe at Carlisle, recalled:

He had a kind of ease in his gait that is hard to describe. Equilibrium with no stricture, but couched in the lineup of football he was the epitome of concentration, wary, with an effect of plenty in reserve.

=== Olympic career ===
For the 1912 Summer Olympics in Stockholm, Sweden, two new multi-event disciplines were included, the pentathlon and the decathlon. A pentathlon, based on the ancient Greek event, had been introduced at the 1906 Intercalated Games. The 1912 version consisted of the long jump, javelin throw, 200-meter dash, discus throw, and 1500-meter run.

The decathlon was a relatively new event in modern athletics, although a similar competition known as the all-around championship had been part of American track meets since the 1880s. A men's version had been featured on the program of the 1904 St. Louis Olympics. The events of the new decathlon differed slightly from the American version.

Thorpe was so versatile that he served as Carlisle's one-man team in several track meets. According to his obituary in The New York Times, he could run the 100-yard dash in 10 seconds flat; the 220 in 21.8 seconds; the 440 in 51.8 seconds; the 880 in 1:57, the mile in 4:35; the 120-yard high hurdles in 15 seconds; and the 220-yard low hurdles in 24 seconds. He could long jump 23 ft 6 in and high-jump 6 ft 5 in. He could pole vault 11 feet; put the shot 47 ft 9 in; throw the javelin 163 feet; and throw the discus 136 feet.

Thorpe entered the U.S. Olympic trials for both the pentathlon and the decathlon. He easily earned a place on the pentathlon team, winning three events. The decathlon trial was subsequently cancelled, and Thorpe was chosen to represent the U.S. in the event. The pentathlon and decathlon teams also included Avery Brundage, a future International Olympic Committee president.

Thorpe was extremely busy in the Olympics. Along with the decathlon and pentathlon, he competed in the long jump and high jump. The first competition was the pentathlon on July 7. He won four of the five events and placed third in the javelin, an event he had not competed in before 1912. Although the pentathlon was primarily decided on place points, points were also earned for the marks achieved in the individual events. Thorpe won the gold medal. That same day, he qualified for the high jump final, in which he finished in a tie for fourth. On July 12, Thorpe placed seventh in the long jump.

Thorpe's final event was the decathlon, his first (and as it turned out, his only) decathlon. Strong competition from local favorite Hugo Wieslander was expected. Thorpe, however, defeated Wieslander by 688 points. He placed in the top four in all ten events, and his Olympic record of 8,413 points stood for nearly two decades. Even more remarkably, because someone had stolen his shoes just before he was due to compete, he found a mismatched pair of replacements, including one from a trash can, and won the gold medal wearing them. Overall, Thorpe won eight of the 15 individual events comprising the pentathlon and decathlon.

As was the custom of the day, the medals were presented to the athletes during the closing ceremonies of the games. Along with the two gold medals, Thorpe also received two challenge prizes, which had been donated by King Gustav V of Sweden for the decathlon and Czar Nicholas II of Russia for the pentathlon. Several sources recount that, when awarding Thorpe his prize, King Gustav said, "You, sir, are the greatest athlete in the world", to which Thorpe replied, "Thanks, King". While the compliment from King Gustav is confirmed in the September 1912 publication of The Red Man, Thorpe biographer Kate Buford suggests that Thorpe's remark was embellished, as she believes that such a response "would have been out of character for a man who was highly uncomfortable in public ceremonies and hated to stand out." The quoted reply did not appear in newspapers until 1948—36 years after his appearance in the Olympics— and surfaced in books by 1952.

Thorpe's successes were followed in the United States. On the Olympic team's return, Thorpe was the star attraction in a ticker-tape parade on Broadway. He remembered later, "I heard people yelling my name, and I couldn't realize how one fellow could have so many friends."

Apart from his track and field appearances, Thorpe also played in one of two exhibition baseball games at the 1912 Olympics, which featured two teams composed mostly of U.S. track and field athletes. Thorpe had previous experience in the sport, as the public soon learned.

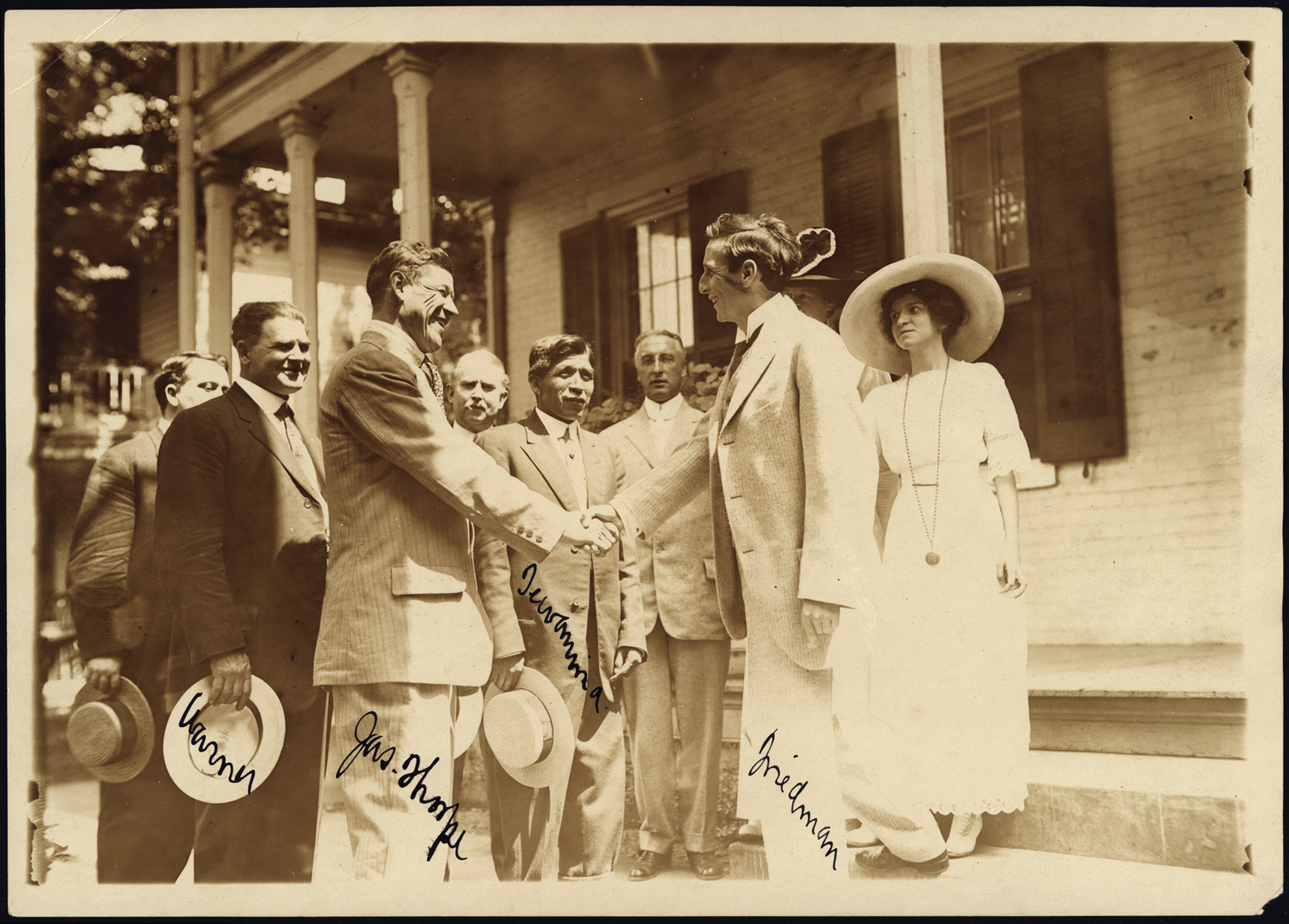
Thorpe shaking hands with Moses Friedman while Glenn "Pop" Warner (left), Lewis Tewanima (center), and a crowd look on

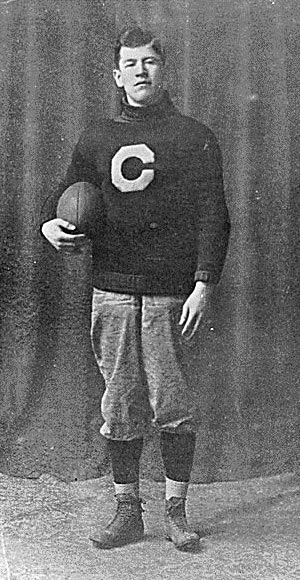
Thorpe in Carlisle Indian Industrial School uniform, c. 1909

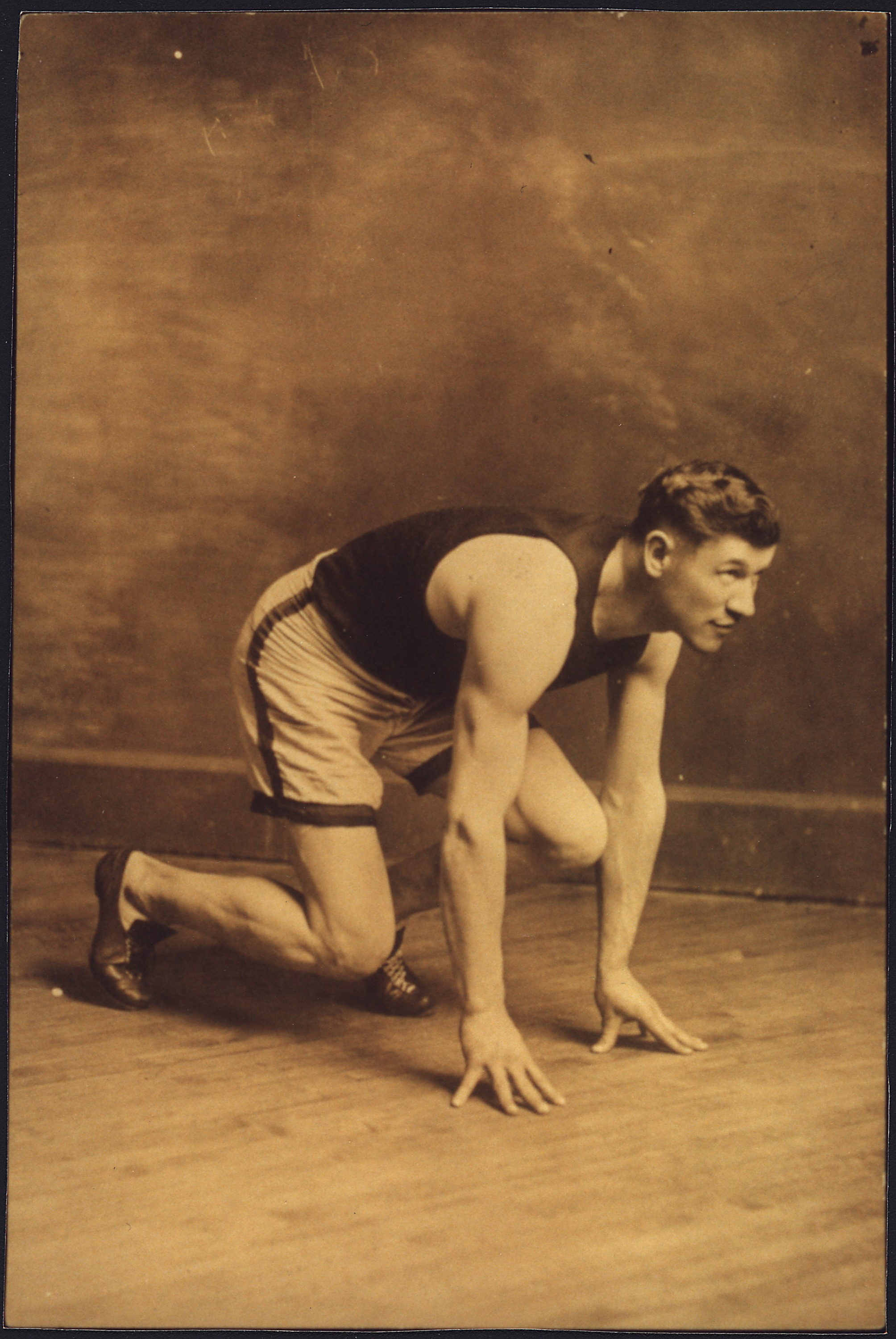
Thorpe, c. 1910

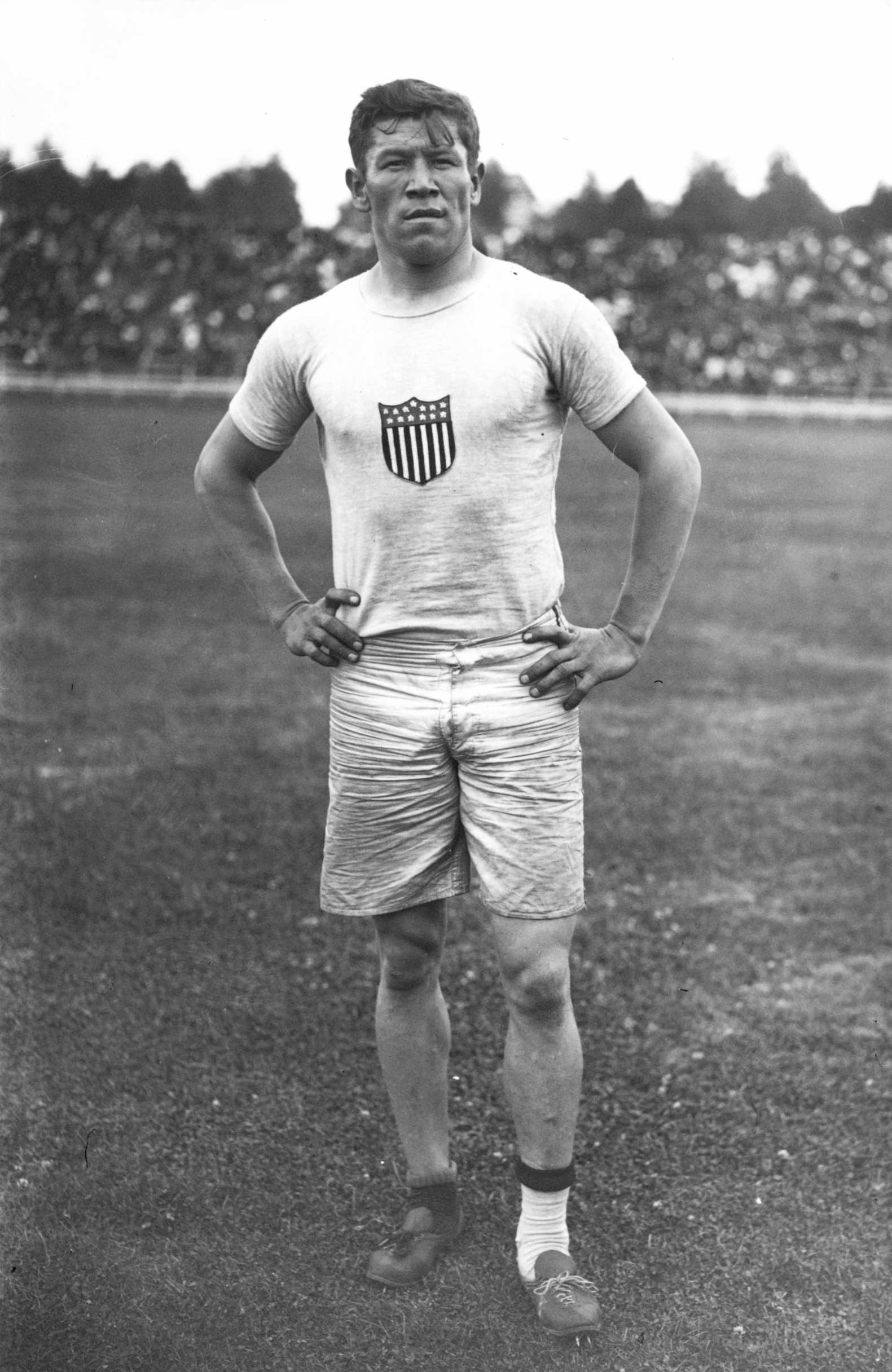
Thorpe at the 1912 Summer Olympics

=== All-Around champion ===
After his victories at the Olympic Games in Sweden, on September 2, 1912, Thorpe returned to Celtic Park, the home of the Irish American Athletic Club, in Queens, New York (where he had qualified four months earlier for the Olympic Games), to compete in the Amateur Athletic Union's All-Around Championship. Competing against Bruno Brodd of the Irish American Athletic Club and John L. Bredemus of Princeton University, he won seven of the ten events contested and came in second in the remaining three. With a total point score of 7,476 points, Thorpe broke the previous record of 7,385 points set in 1909 (also at Celtic Park), by Martin Sheridan, the champion athlete of the Irish American Athletic Club. Sheridan, a five-time Olympic gold medalist, was present to watch his record broken. He approached Thorpe after the event and shook his hand saying, "Jim, my boy, you're a great man. I never expect to look upon a finer athlete." He told a reporter from New York World, "Thorpe is the greatest athlete that ever lived. He has me beaten fifty ways. Even when I was in my prime, I could not do what he did today."

=== Olympic medal controversy ===
In 1912, strict rules regarding amateurism were in effect for athletes participating in the Olympics. Athletes who received money prizes for competitions, were sports teachers, or had competed previously against professionals, were not considered amateurs. They were barred from competition.

In late January 1913, the Worcester Telegram reported that Thorpe had played semi-professional baseball before the Olympics, and other U.S. newspapers followed up the story. Thorpe had played semi-professional baseball in the Eastern Carolina League for Rocky Mount, North Carolina, in 1909 and 1910, receiving meager pay; reportedly as little as US$2 ($69 in 2025) per game and as much as US$35 ($1,209 in 2025) per week. College players, in fact, regularly spent summers playing professionally in order to earn some money, but most used aliases, unlike Thorpe. Although the public did not seem to care much about Thorpe's past, the Amateur Athletic Union (AAU), and especially its secretary James Edward Sullivan, took the case very seriously.

Thorpe wrote a letter to Sullivan, in which he admitted playing professional baseball:

I hope I will be partly excused by the fact that I was simply an Indian schoolboy and did not know all about such things. In fact, I did not know that I was doing wrong, because I was doing what I knew several other college men had done, except that they did not use their own names ...

His letter did not help. The AAU decided to withdraw Thorpe's amateur status retroactively. Later that year, the International Olympic Committee (IOC) unanimously decided to strip Thorpe of his Olympic titles, medals and awards, and declare him a professional. The IOC subsequently awarded the gold medal to silver medalist Hugo Wieslander, who refused to accept it, as he felt that Thorpe was the legitimate owner.

Although Thorpe had played for money, the AAU and IOC did not follow their own rules for disqualification. The rulebook for the 1912 Olympics stated that protests had to be made "within 30 days from the closing ceremonies of the games." The first newspaper reports did not appear until January 1913, about six months after the Stockholm Games had concluded. There is also some evidence that Thorpe was known to have played semi-professional baseball before the Olympics, but the AAU had ignored the issue until being confronted with it in 1913. The only positive aspect of this affair for Thorpe was that, as soon as the news was reported that he had been declared a professional, he received offers from professional sports clubs.

== Professional career ==
=== Baseball ===
In 1910, Thorpe had the unusual status of a sought-after free agent at the major league level during the era of the reserve clause, because the minor league team that last held his contract had disbanded that year, so he was free to choose which baseball team to play for. In January 1913, he turned down a starting position with the St. Louis Browns, then at the bottom of the American League. Thorpe signed with the New York Giants baseball club in 1913, the defending 1912 National League champion. With Thorpe playing in 19 of their 151 games, they repeated as the 1913 National League champions. Immediately following the Giants' October loss in the 1913 World Series, Thorpe and the Giants joined the Chicago White Sox for a world tour. Barnstorming across the United States and around the world, Thorpe was the celebrity of the tour.

Thorpe's presence increased the publicity, attendance and gate receipts for the tour. He met with Pope Pius X and Abbas II Hilmi Bey (the last Khedive of Egypt), and played before 20,000 people in London including King George V. Thorpe was the last man to compete in both the Olympics (in a non-baseball sport) and Major League Baseball before Eddy Alvarez did the same in 2020.

Thorpe played sporadically with the Giants as an outfielder for three seasons. After playing in the minor leagues with the Milwaukee Brewers in 1916, he returned to the Giants in 1917. He was sold to the Cincinnati Reds early in the season. In the "double no-hitter" between Fred Toney of the Reds and Hippo Vaughn of the Chicago Cubs, Thorpe drove in the winning run in the 10th inning. Late in the season, he was sold back to the Giants. Again, he played sporadically for them in 1918 before being traded to the Boston Braves on May 21, 1919, for Pat Ragan. In his career, he amassed 91 runs scored, 82 runs batted in and a .252 batting average over 289 games. He continued to play minor league baseball until 1922, and once played for the minor league Toledo Mud Hens.

=== Football ===
Thorpe had not abandoned football either. He first played professional football in 1913 as a member of the Indiana-based Pine Village Pros, a team that had a several-season winning streak against local teams during the 1910s. Thorpe worked as assistant coach for the Indiana Hoosiers during the 1915 season, working with the backfield and kickers. He signed with the Canton Bulldogs in 1915. They paid him $250 (equivalent to $8,000 in 2025) a game, a tremendous wage at the time. Before signing him Canton was averaging 1,200 fans a game, but 8,000 showed up for Thorpe's debut against the Massillon Tigers. The team won titles in 1916, 1917, and 1919. Thorpe reportedly ended the 1919 championship game by kicking a wind-assisted 95-yard punt from his team's own 5-yard line, effectively putting the game out of reach.

In 1920, the Bulldogs were one of 14 teams to form the American Professional Football Association, which became the National Football League (NFL) two years later. Thorpe was nominally their first president, but spent most of the year playing for Canton; a year later, he was replaced as president by Joseph Carr. He continued to play for Canton, coaching the team as well. Between 1921 and 1923, he helped organize and played for the Oorang Indians (La Rue, Ohio), an all-Native American team. Although the team's record was 3–6 in 1922, and 1–10 in 1923, Thorpe played well and was selected for the Green Bay Press-Gazette's first All-NFL team in 1923. This was later formally recognized in 1931 by the NFL as the league's official All-NFL team.

Thorpe never played for an NFL championship team. He retired from professional football at age 41, having played 52 games for six teams from 1920 to 1928.

=== Basketball ===
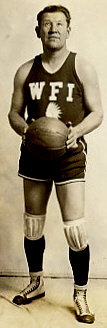
Thorpe with a basketball, 1927

Most of Thorpe's biographers were unaware of his basketball career until a ticket that documented his time in professional basketball was discovered in an old book in 2005. By 1926, he was the main feature of the World Famous Indians of La Rue, Ohio, a traveling basketball team. The team barnstormed for at least two years (1927–28) in multiple states. Although stories about Thorpe's team were published in some local newspapers at the time, his basketball career is not well-documented.

For a brief time in 1913, he was considering going into professional hockey for the Tecumseh Hockey Club in Toronto, Ontario, Canada.

== Honors and achievements ==
You, sir, are the greatest athlete in the world.

— King Gustav V of Sweden, awarding Thorpe two gold medals at the 1912 Olympics

=== National ===
- Presidential Medal of Freedom (2024)

=== Halls of fame ===
- Helms Athletic Foundation Pro Football Hall of Fame – Inaugural Class of 1950
- Oklahoma Hall of Fame – Class of 1950
- College Football Hall of Fame – Inaugural Class of 1951
- Pro Football Hall of Fame – Inaugural Class of 1963
  - Statue of Jim Thorpe in the lobby of the Pro Football Hall of Fame
- Pennsylvania Sports Hall of Fame – Inaugural Class of 1963
- American Indian Athletic Hall of Fame – Inaugural Class of 1972
- National Track and Field Hall of Fame – Class of 1975
- U.S. Olympic Hall of Fame – Inaugural Class of 1983
- Oklahoma Sports Hall of Fame – Inaugural Class of 1986
  - Statue of Jim Thorpe
- American Football Kicking Hall of Fame – Inaugural Class of 2008
- National Native American Hall of Fame – Inaugural Class of 2018
- Middle Atlantic AAU Hall of Fame – Class of 2023
- United States Athletics Hall of Fame – Inaugural Class of 2023
- National High School Football Hall of Fame – Class of 2025

=== Track and field ===
- U.S. Olympic Trials Pentathlon Champion (May 18, 1912)
  - 1st place – Running broad jump
  - 1st place – 200 metres
  - 1st place – Discus throw
  - 2nd place – 1500 metres
  - 2nd place – Javelin throw
- 2× Olympic Challenge Prize Winner (1912)
  - The Swedish King's Challenge Prize Trophy
  - The Emperor of Russia's Challenge Prize Trophy
- 2× Olympic gold medalist (1912)
  - 1912 Olympic Pentathlon gold medal
    - 1st place – Long jump
    - 1st place – 200 metres
    - 1st place – Discus throw
    - 1st place – 1500 metres
    - 3rd place – Javelin throw
  - 1912 Olympic Decathlon gold medal
    - 1st place – Shot put
    - 1st place – High jump
    - 1st place – 110 metres hurdles
    - 1st place – 1500 metres
    - 3rd place – Long jump
    - 3rd place – Discus throw
    - Tied-3rd place – 100 metres
    - Tied-3rd place – Pole vault
    - 4th place – Javelin throw
    - 4th place – 400 metres
- 4th place in the 1912 Olympic Men's High Jump
- 7th place in the 1912 Olympic Men's Long Jump
- Amateur Athletic Union All-Around Championships gold medal (September 2, 1912) (Note: First place in seven of the ten events contested, and came in second in the remaining three.)
  - Record-breaking 7,476 points (Note: The former record was 7,385, made by Martin Sheridan in 1909.)
- The Thorpe Cup, an annual international decathlon and heptathlon meeting between the United States and Germany, is named in his honor (1993)

=== Football ===
- 3× Ohio League champion (1916, 1917, 1919)
- First-team All-Pro (1923)
- NFL 1920s All-Decade Team
- NFL 50th Anniversary All-Time Team
- No. 37 on The Top 100: NFL's Greatest Players
- First Commissioner of the NFL (1920–1921)

As a coach

- 3× Ohio League champion (1916, 1917, 1919)

=== College ===
College Football

- National Champion (BL) (1911)
- Heisman Trophy (NFF) (1911)
- Third-team All-American (1908)
  - WC third-team All-American (1908)
  - PI All-American team (1908)
- 2× Consensus All-American (1911, 1912)
  - 2× WC first-team All-American (1911, 1912)
  - WSF second-team All-American (1911)
  - CC first-team All-American (1911)
  - HL All-American team (1911)
  - BM All-American team (1911)
  - CSM All-American team (1911)
  - SPS All-American team (1911)
  - COMP (Note: Louis A. Douglier of the Washington Times, picked what he terms the composite All-Star football team, after studying the selections made by 23 newspaper writers.) first-team All-American (1912)
  - NYS first-team All-American (1912)
  - PI first-team All-American (1912)
  - CSM first-team All-American (1912)
  - BS All-American team (1912)
  - RE (Note: sports editor for The Evening World.) first-team All-American (1912)
  - WJM (Note: Selected by sports writer William James MacBeth of the New York American.) first-team All-American (1912)
  - ASH (Note: Selected by Alfred S. Harvey of the Milwaukee Free Press.) first-team All-American
  - TC (Note: Selected by Tommy Clark.) first-team All-American (1912)
  - PHD first-team All-American (1912)
  - PW first-team All-American (1912)
  - TET first-team All-American (1912)
  - HF first-team All-American (1912)
  - PP first-team All-American (1912)
  - MDJ first-team All-American (1912)
- NCAA "unofficial" interceptions leader (1912)
- NCAA "unofficial" scoring leader (1912)
- NCAA "unofficial" touchdowns leader (1912)
- 3× NCAA "unofficial" rushing yards leader (1908, 1911, 1912)
- 3× NCAA "unofficial" total offense leader (1908, 1911, 1912)
- Carlisle Indians All-Time Team
- FWAA Early Era All-America Team
- Walter Camp All-Time All-American
- Walter Camp All-Century Team (Note: Selected as a cornerback.)
- The Jim Thorpe Award, named in his memory, has been awarded to the top defensive back in college football since 1986

Track and Field (Note: The true number of track meets participated in and won is unknown. The following results can be found from a collection of newspaper clippings referenced here.)

- Penn Relays (1908)
  - Tied-1st place – High jump
- Carlisle vs Syracuse Dual Meet (1908)
  - 1st place – High hurdles
  - 1st place – Low hurdles
  - 1st place – Shot put
  - 1st place – High jump
  - 1st place – Broad jump
  - 2nd place – Hammer throw
- Pennsylvania Intercollegiate Championships in Harrisburg, PA (1908)
  - 1st place – High hurdles
  - 1st place – Low hurdles
  - 1st place – High jump
  - 1st place – Broad jump
  - 1st place – Hammer throw
- Middle Atlantic Athletic Association Championships in Philadelphia (1908)
  - 1st place – High hurdles
  - 1st place – Low hurdles
  - 1st place – High jump
  - 1st place – Broad jump
  - 1st place – Hammer throw
- Carlisle vs Lafayette Dual Meet (1909)
  - 1st place – High hurdles
  - 1st place – Low hurdles
  - 1st place – High jump
  - 1st place – Long jump
  - 1st place – Shot put
  - 1st place – Discus throw
  - 3rd place – 100-yard dash
- Middle Atlantic Indoor Championship Games at the Second Regiment Armory (1912)
  - 1st place – 75-yard dash
  - 1st place – 60 yard high hurdles
  - 1st place – High jump
  - 1st place – Shot put
  - 2nd place – Standing triple jump

Ballroom Dancing

- Inter-Collegiate Ballroom Dancing Champion (1912)

=== Media ===
- Associated Press's Athlete of the Half-Century (1950)
- Associated Press's Greatest Football Player of the Half-Century (1950)
- Ranked #2 after Jesse Owens on the Associated Press's Greatest Track and Field Athletes of the Half-Century (1950)
- Shortly after his death in 1953, Time magazine named him The Greatest Athlete
- Greatest American Football Player in History in a poll conducted by Sport magazine (1977)
- Ranked #3 on the Associated Press's Top 100 Athletes of the 20th Century (1999)
- Ranked #7 on ESPN SportsCentury: Top 50 North American Athletes of the 20th Century (1999)
- Named America's Athlete of the Century by a resolutions of the U.S. House of Representatives and Senate (1999)
- ABC's Wide World of Sports Athlete of the Century (2000)
- In 2008, Sports Illustrated retroactively named Thorpe the Heisman Trophy winner for the 1911 and 1912 seasons
- Ranked #2 on Bleacher Report's Top 10 Greatest Athletes of All Time (2018)
- Ranked #5 on ESPN's Top 150 College Football Players of All Time (2020)
- Ranked #7 on GiveMeSport's list of Top 50 Greatest Athletes of All Time (2024)

== Marriage and family ==
Thorpe married three times and had a total of eight children. In 1913, Thorpe married Iva M. Miller, whom he had met at Carlisle. In 1917, Iva and Thorpe bought a house now known as the Jim Thorpe House in Yale, Oklahoma, and lived there until 1923. They had four children: James Jr., Gale, Charlotte, and Grace Frances, an environmentalist and Native rights activist. Their son James Thorpe Jr. died in the influenza epidemic of 1918 at the age of three. Miller filed for divorce from Thorpe in 1925, claiming desertion.

In 1926, Thorpe married Freeda Verona Kirkpatrick (September 19, 1905 – March 2, 2007). She was working for the manager of the baseball team for which he was playing at the time. They had four sons: Phillip, William, Richard, and John Thorpe. Kirkpatrick divorced Thorpe in 1941, after they had been married for 15 years.

Lastly, Thorpe married Patricia Gladys Askew on June 2, 1945. She was with him when he died.

== Later life, film career, and death ==
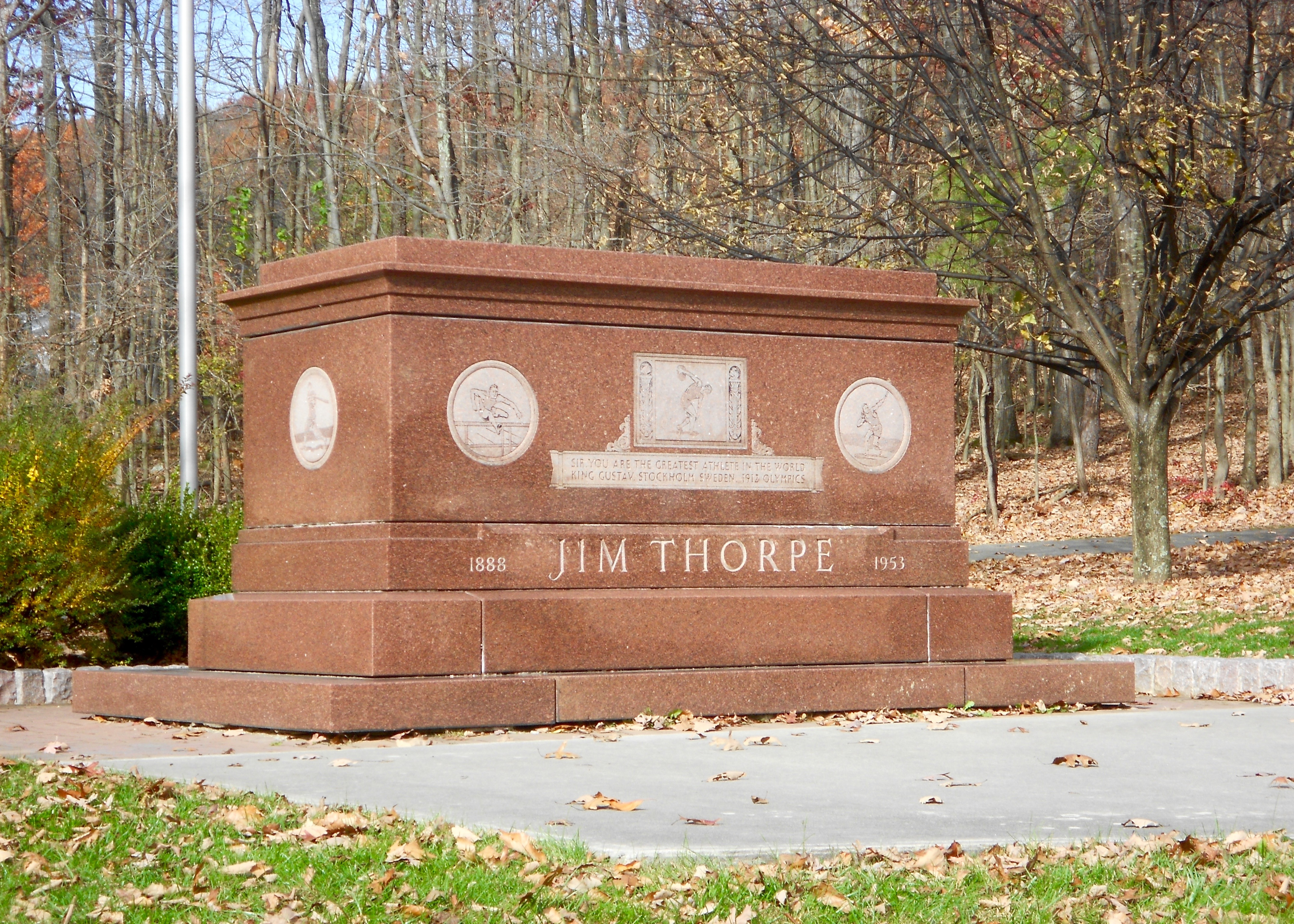
Tomb of Jim Thorpe in Jim Thorpe, Pennsylvania

After his athletic career, Thorpe struggled to provide for his family. He found it difficult to work a non-sports-related job and never held a job for an extended period of time. During the Great Depression in particular, he had various jobs, among others as a movie actor, mostly as an extra, usually playing an American Indian in Westerns, starting with the 1931 serial Battling with Buffalo Bill. In the 1932 comedy Always Kickin', Thorpe was prominently cast in a speaking part as himself, a kicking coach teaching young football players to drop-kick. He played the captain of the guard in 1935's She, an umpire in the 1940 film Knute Rockne, All American, and a member of the Navajo Nation in the 1950 film Wagon Master. An American Indian Magazine article states Thorpe appeared in over 70 films.

In 1931, during the Great Depression, Thorpe sold the film rights to his life story to MGM for $1,500 (equivalent to $32,000 in 2025). Warner Bros. eventually acquired the rights and memorialized Thorpe in Jim Thorpe – All-American (1951), starring Burt Lancaster. The film was directed by Michael Curtiz. Although there were rumors that Thorpe received no money, he was paid $15,000 by Warner Bros. plus a $2,500 donation toward an annuity for him by the studio's head of publicity. The movie included archival footage of the 1912 and 1932 Olympics. Thorpe was seen in one scene as a coaching assistant. It was also distributed in the United Kingdom, where it was called Man of Bronze.

Apart from his career in films, he worked as a construction worker, a doorman/bouncer, a security guard, and a ditchdigger. He briefly joined the United States Merchant Marine in 1945, during World War II. Thorpe was a chronic alcoholic during his later life. He ran out of money sometime in the early 1950s. When hospitalized for lip cancer in 1950, Thorpe was admitted as a charity case. At a press conference announcing the procedure, his wife, Patricia, wept and pleaded for help, saying, "We're broke ... Jim has nothing but his name and his memories. He has spent money on his own people and has given it away. He has often been exploited."

In early 1953, Thorpe went into cardiac arrest dining with Patricia in their home in Lomita, California. He was briefly revived by artificial respiration and spoke to those around him, but lost consciousness shortly afterward. He died on March 28 at the age of 65.

== Victim of racism ==
Thorpe, whose parents were both mixed-race, was raised as a Native American. He accomplished his athletic feats despite the severe racial inequality of the United States. It has often been suggested that his Olympic medals were stripped by the athletic officials because of his ethnicity. While it is difficult to prove this, the public comment at the time largely reflected this view. At the time Thorpe won his gold medals, not all Native Americans were recognized as U.S. citizens (the U.S. government had frequently demanded that they make concessions to adopt European-American ways to receive such recognition). Citizenship was not granted to all American Indians until 1924.

When Thorpe attended Carlisle, the students' ethnicity was used for marketing purposes. The football team was called the Indians. To create headlines, the school and journalists often portrayed sporting competitions as conflicts of Indians against whites. The first notice of Thorpe in The New York Times was headlined "Indian Thorpe in Olympiad; Redskin from Carlisle Will Strive for Place on American Team." Throughout his life, Thorpe's accomplishments were described in a similar racial context by other newspapers and sportswriters, which reflected the era.

== Legacy ==
=== Olympic awards reinstated ===
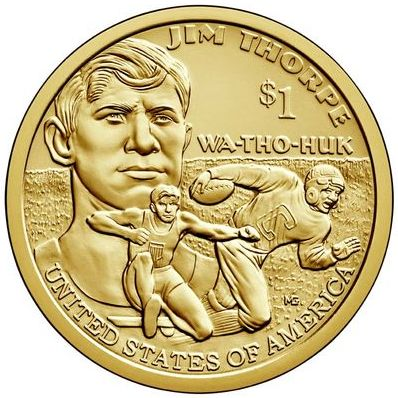
Thorpe is featured on the reverse of the 2018 Native American dollar.

Over the years, supporters of Thorpe attempted to have his Olympic titles reinstated. Olympic officials, including former teammate and later president of the IOC Avery Brundage, rebuffed several attempts. Brundage once said, "Ignorance is no excuse." Most persistent were the author Robert Wheeler and his wife, Florence Ridlon. They succeeded in having the AAU and United States Olympic Committee overturn its decision and restore Thorpe's amateur status before 1913.

In 1982, Wheeler and Ridlon established the Jim Thorpe Foundation and gained support from the U.S. Congress. Armed with this support and evidence from 1912 proving that Thorpe's disqualification had occurred after the 30-day time period allowed by Olympics rules, they succeeded in making the case to the IOC. In October 1982, the IOC Executive Committee approved Thorpe's reinstatement. In an unusual ruling, they declared that Thorpe was co-champion with Ferdinand Bie and Hugo Wieslander, although both of these athletes had always said they considered Thorpe to be the only champion. In a ceremony on January 18, 1983, the IOC presented two of Thorpe's children, Gale and Bill, with commemorative medals. Thorpe's original medals had been held in museums, but they were stolen and have never been recovered. The IOC listed Thorpe as a co-gold medalist.

In July 2020, a petition from Bright Path Strong began circulating that called upon the IOC to reinstate Thorpe as the sole winner in his events in the 1912 Olympics. It was backed by Pictureworks Entertainment, which is making a film about Thorpe. The petition was supported by another Native American Olympian, Billy Mills, who won a gold medal in the 10,000 meters at the 1964 Tokyo Games. In consultation with surviving family members of Wieslander, the IOC voted to reinstate Thorpe as the sole winner of both events on July 14, 2022, after the National Olympic Committees of Norway and Sweden had given their approval.

=== Honors ===
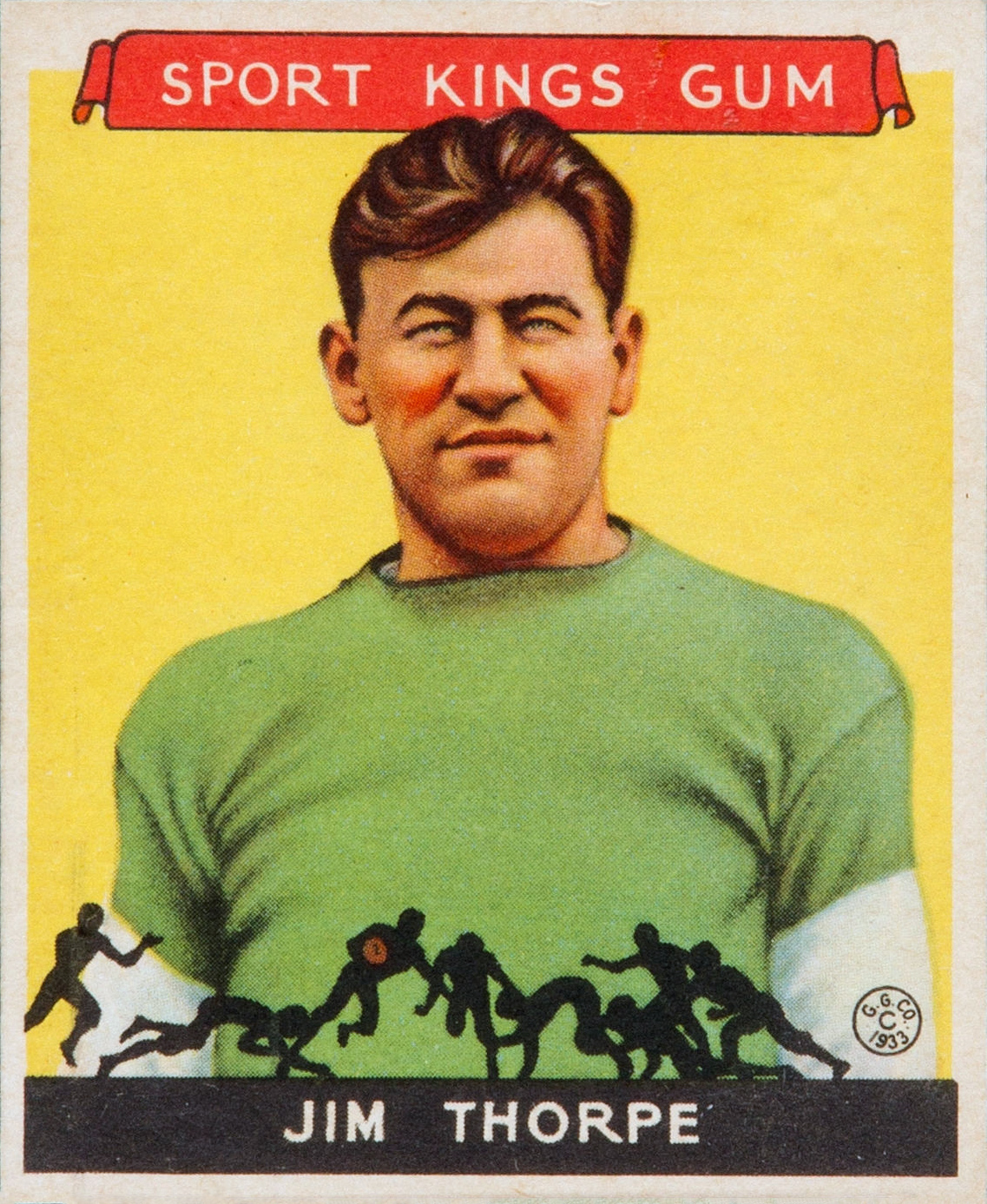
1933 Goudey Sport Kings card of Thorpe

Thorpe's tribe, the Sac and Fox Nation, added Olympic rings to their official flag to honor him.

Thorpe's monument, featuring the quote from Gustav V ("You, sir, are the greatest athlete in the world."), still stands near the town named for him, Jim Thorpe, Pennsylvania. The grave rests on mounds of soil from Thorpe's native Oklahoma and from the stadium in which he won his Olympic medals.

Thorpe's achievements received great acclaim from sports journalists, both during his lifetime and since his death. In 1950, an Associated Press poll of almost 400 sportswriters and broadcasters voted Thorpe the "greatest athlete" of the first half of the 20th century. That same year, the Associated Press ranked Thorpe as the "greatest American football player" of the first half of the century. Pro Football Hall of Fame voters selected him for the NFL 50th Anniversary All-Time Team in 1967. In 1999, the Associated Press placed him third on its list of the top athletes of the century, following Babe Ruth and Michael Jordan. ESPN ranked Thorpe seventh on their list of best North American athletes of the century.

Thorpe was inducted into the Pro Football Hall of Fame in 1963, one of seventeen players in the charter class. Thorpe is memorialized in the Pro Football Hall of Fame rotunda with a larger-than-life statue. He was also inducted into halls of fame for college football, American Olympic teams, and the national track and field competition.

In 2018, Thorpe became one of the inductees in the first induction ceremony held by the National Native American Hall of Fame. The fitness center and a hall at Haskell Indian Nations University are named in honor of Thorpe.

President Richard Nixon, as authorized by U.S. Senate Joint Resolution 73, proclaimed Monday, April 16, 1973, as "Jim Thorpe Day" to promote nationwide recognition of Thorpe's life. In 1986, the Jim Thorpe Association established an award with Thorpe's name. The Jim Thorpe Award is given annually to the best defensive back in college football. The annual Thorpe Cup athletics meeting is named in his honor. The United States Postal Service issued a 32¢ stamp on February 3, 1998, as part of the Celebrate the Century stamp sheet series.

In a poll of sports fans published in 2000 by ABC Sports, Thorpe was voted the Greatest Athlete of the Twentieth Century; the pool of 15 other top athletes included Muhammad Ali, Pelé, Babe Ruth, Jesse Owens, Wayne Gretzky, Jack Nicklaus, and Michael Jordan.

In 2018, Thorpe was honored with the AAU Gussie Crawford Lifetime Achievement Award for his contributions to amateur sports. That same year, he was also commemorated on the Native American dollar coin; proposed designs were released in 2015.

In 2024, President Joe Biden announced that Thorpe would be awarded the Presidential Medal of Freedom, the highest civilian honor given in the United States.

=== Jim Thorpe, Pennsylvania ===
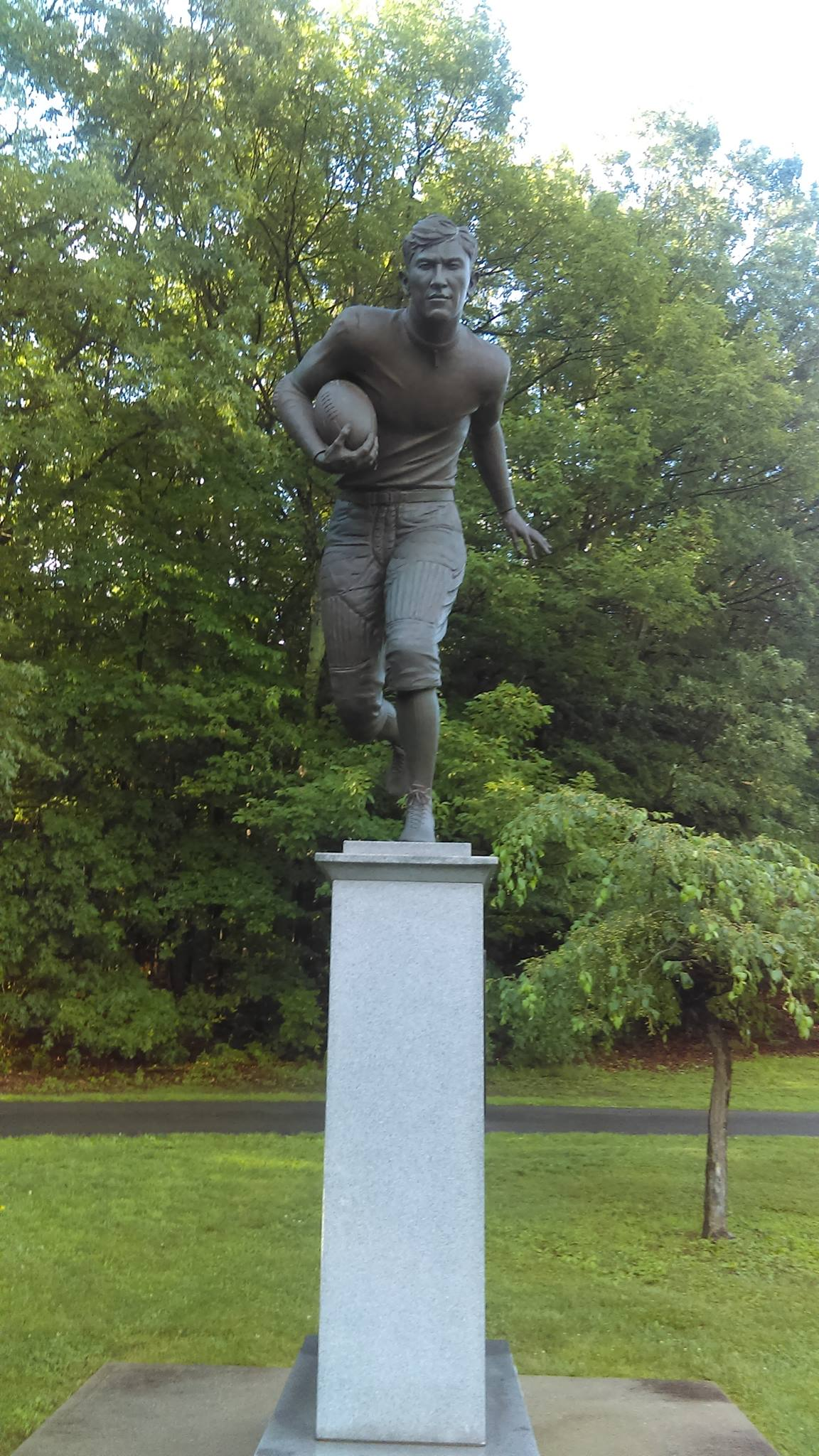
One of the two statues of Thorpe located in Jim Thorpe, Pennsylvania

Thorpe's body was initially intended to be buried in the Garden Grove Cemetery in Oklahoma. A committee raised $2,500 to have his body transported from California to Shawnee. On April 12, 1953, on a farm in Oklahoma, Sac and Fox Thunder clan members, along with indigenous members of Thorpe's family, met to carry out a traditional Sac burial ceremony. During this ceremony, Thorpe's third wife, Patricia, accompanied by law enforcement, interrupted it, and Thorpe's body was removed. Following this, a funeral for Thorpe was held at St. Benedict's Catholic Church in Shawnee, Oklahoma. Afterwards, his body lay in state at Fairview Cemetery. Shawnee residents began a fundraising effort to erect a memorial for Thorpe at the town's athletic park. Local officials had asked state legislators for funding, but a bill that included $25,000 for their proposal was vetoed by Governor Johnston Murray.

Meanwhile, Thorpe's third wife, unbeknownst to the rest of his family, took Thorpe's body and had it shipped to Pennsylvania when she heard that the small Pennsylvania towns of Mauch Chunk and East Mauch Chunk were seeking to attract business. She made a deal with officials which, according to Thorpe's son Jack, was made by the widowed Patricia for monetary considerations. This deal was made in May 1954, a year after Thorpe had died. The towns "bought" Thorpe's remains, which were interred there in 1957, erected a monument to him at the grave, merged, and renamed the newly united town in his honor as Jim Thorpe, Pennsylvania. Thorpe had never been there. The monument site contains his tomb, two statues of him in athletic poses, and historical markers recounting his life story.

In June 2010, Jack Thorpe filed a federal lawsuit against the borough of Jim Thorpe, seeking to have his father's remains returned to his homeland and re-interred near other family members in Oklahoma. Citing the Native American Graves Protection and Repatriation Act (NAGPRA), Jack was arguing to bring his father's remains to the reservation in Oklahoma, to be buried near those of his father, sisters and brother, a mile from the place he was born. He claimed that the agreement between his stepmother and Jim Thorpe, Pennsylvania, borough officials was made against the wishes of other family members, who want him buried in Native American land. Jack Thorpe died at 73 on February 22, 2011.

In April 2013, U.S. District Judge Richard Caputo ruled that Jim Thorpe borough amounts to a museum under the NAGPRA and therefore is bound by that law. A lawyer for Bill and Richard Thorpe said the men would pursue the legal process to have their father's remains returned to Sac and Fox land in central Oklahoma. On October 23, 2014, the United States Court of Appeals for the Third Circuit reversed Judge Caputo's ruling. The appeals court held that Jim Thorpe borough is not a "museum", as that term is used in NAGPRA, and that the plaintiffs therefore could not invoke that federal statute to seek reinterment of Thorpe's remains. In NAGPRA language, "'museum' means any institution or State or local government agency (including any institution of higher learning) that receives Federal funds and has possession of, or control over, Native American cultural items." The Court of Appeals directed the trial court to enter a judgment in favor of the borough. The appeals court said Pennsylvania law allows the plaintiffs to ask a state court to order reburial of Thorpe's remains, but noted, "once a body is interred there is great reluctance in permitting same to be moved, absent clear and compelling reasons for such a move." On October 5, 2015, the United States Supreme Court refused to hear the matter, effectively ending the legal process.

=== Jim Thorpe Marathon ===
The Jim Thorpe Area Running Festival is a series of races started in 2019 in Jim Thorpe, Pennsylvania. It includes a marathon, a 26.2 mile footrace that features a steady elevation drop from start to finish.
