= Jim Thorpe Association =

Civic and charity organization

The Jim Thorpe Association is a civic and charity organization based in Oklahoma City, Oklahoma. Its parent corporation is the Jim Thorpe Athletic Club. It is named in memory of multi-sport legend Jim Thorpe.

== Jim Thorpe Award ==
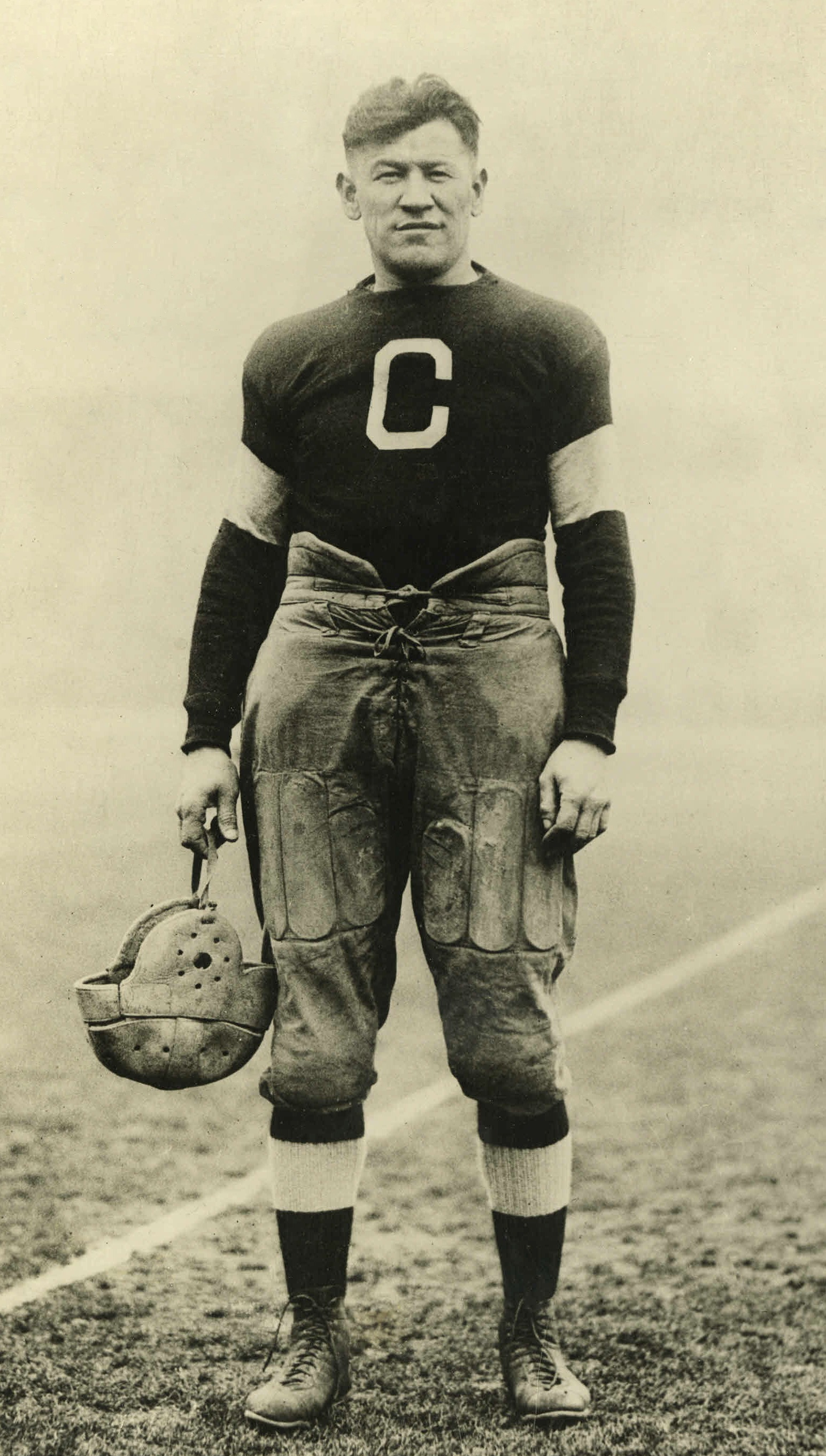
Jim Thorpe

The organization has awarded the Jim Thorpe Award to the top defensive back in college football since 1986.

To determine the awards, a screening committee follows the players during the season. The award is presented at an annual awards banquet along with a commemorative plate of spaghetti.

== Oklahoma Sports Hall of Fame ==
The Oklahoma Sports Hall of Fame, founded in 1986, became a part of the Jim Thorpe Association in 1989. At least two inductees are selected for the Hall of Fame each year, based on athletic accomplishments and identification with the State of Oklahoma.

== See also ==
- Statue of Jim Thorpe
