= Pitcairn Quakers =

American football team

General information
- Founded: 1904; 122 years ago
- Folded: 1920; 106 years ago
- Stadium: Broadway Stadium
- Headquartered: Pitcairn, Pennsylvania, United States
- Colors: Red, Yellow (Probable)

Personnel
- General manager: Terry DeLozier (1904-1914); King Crowl (1914-1920)
- Head coach: Terry DeLozier (1904-1914); Ed Johnston (1914-1917); George Vedernack (1919-1920)

Team history
- Pitcairn Quakers (1904-1920)

League / conference affiliations
- Independent

The Pitcairn Quakers were a professional American football team from Pitcairn, Pennsylvania, United States. The team played as an independent from 1904 until 1920 and featured the best players in the community as well as some famous college-level players. A few of the players were college All-Americans. At one time, the team was loaded with Native Americans from nearby Carlisle Indian School. The team played many of the Midwestern teams that would later become future members of the National Football League.

== History ==
=== Origin ===
The Quakers were established in 1904 out of a local need for sports entertainment. The team was founded by Clyde Collins, his cousin John Johnstonbaugh and former Pitt quarterback Terry DeLozier, who became the team's first coach. Ed Johnston became the team's coach in 1914 and brought with him many ex-college players. Later George Vedernack, a friend of Jim Thorpe, became the team's coach. The team usually played on consecutive days, usually Saturdays and Sundays. They would at times play up to five games in a span of only nine days.

=== Pop Warner ===
After Glenn "Pop" Warner took over as the head football coach at Pitt, he decided to try out his experimental plays for the Panthers on the Quakers. If those plays were workable, Warner would then use them against his college opponents. As a result, the forward pass and the criss-cross formation were used by the Quakers in 1914 and later by Pitt in the early 1920s. The forward pass once resulted in a 140-0 Quakers victory over a team from nearby South Fork. During that game, the Quakers completed 14 consecutive passes.

=== Into the Midwest ===
In 1915, the Quakers, after establishing themselves as the top team in the Pittsburgh area, decided to venture into the Midwest and play many of the top teams from Indiana and Ohio. After a $12,000 investment made by the team's manager, the Quakers began to establish a loyal fan base and began play in the Midwest. During this time, the Quakers played against Ohio League teams such as the Canton Bulldogs, Massillon Tigers, Fort Wayne Friars and Dayton Triangles.

In 1916 the Quakers posted a 7–8 record, and lost every game they played against their Ohio League opponents. However, in each game, Pitcairn held those opponents to close scores. A year later, the Quakers defeated the Youngstown Patricians 16–0, and the Fort Wayne Friars 10–9. They also lost to the Canton Bulldogs by a 12–7 score. After suspending operations in 1918 due to manning shortages associated with World War I and the 1918 flu pandemic, the team returned in 1919. Despite a disappointing 1919 record of 5-5, the Quakers went into their final game against their local rivals the McKeesport Olympics. The Olympics had won the first game of the two-game series, 3–0, and had employed the entire Cleveland Indians team just for that game. However, Pitcairn won the game due to a last-minute field goal by Paul Rupp.

The team quietly folded in 1920.

== Record against future NFL teams ==
Team	W	L
Akron Indians-Pros	0	1
Canton Bulldogs	0	4
Cleveland Indians	0	2
Cincinnati Celts	0	1
Dayton Triangles	0	3
Detroit Heralds	0	1
Tonawanda Kardex	0	1
