= March 1921 =

Month in 1921

<<	March 1921					>>
Su	Mo	Tu	We	Th	Fr	Sa
		1	2	3	4	5
6	7	8	9	10	11	12
13	14	15	16	17	18	19
20	21	22	23	24	25	26
27	28	29	30	31

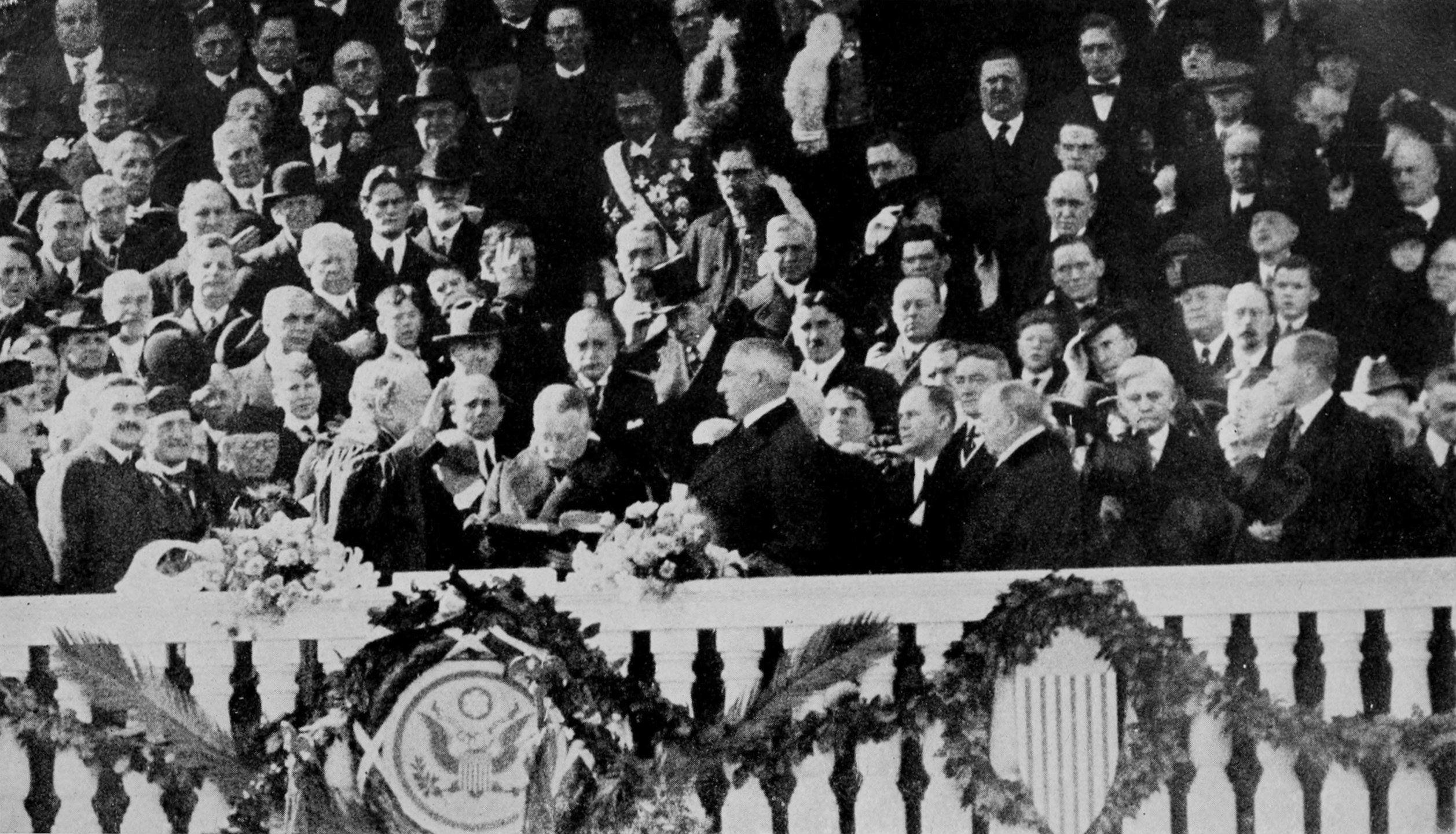
March 4, 1921: Warren G. Harding inaugurated as 26th President of the United States

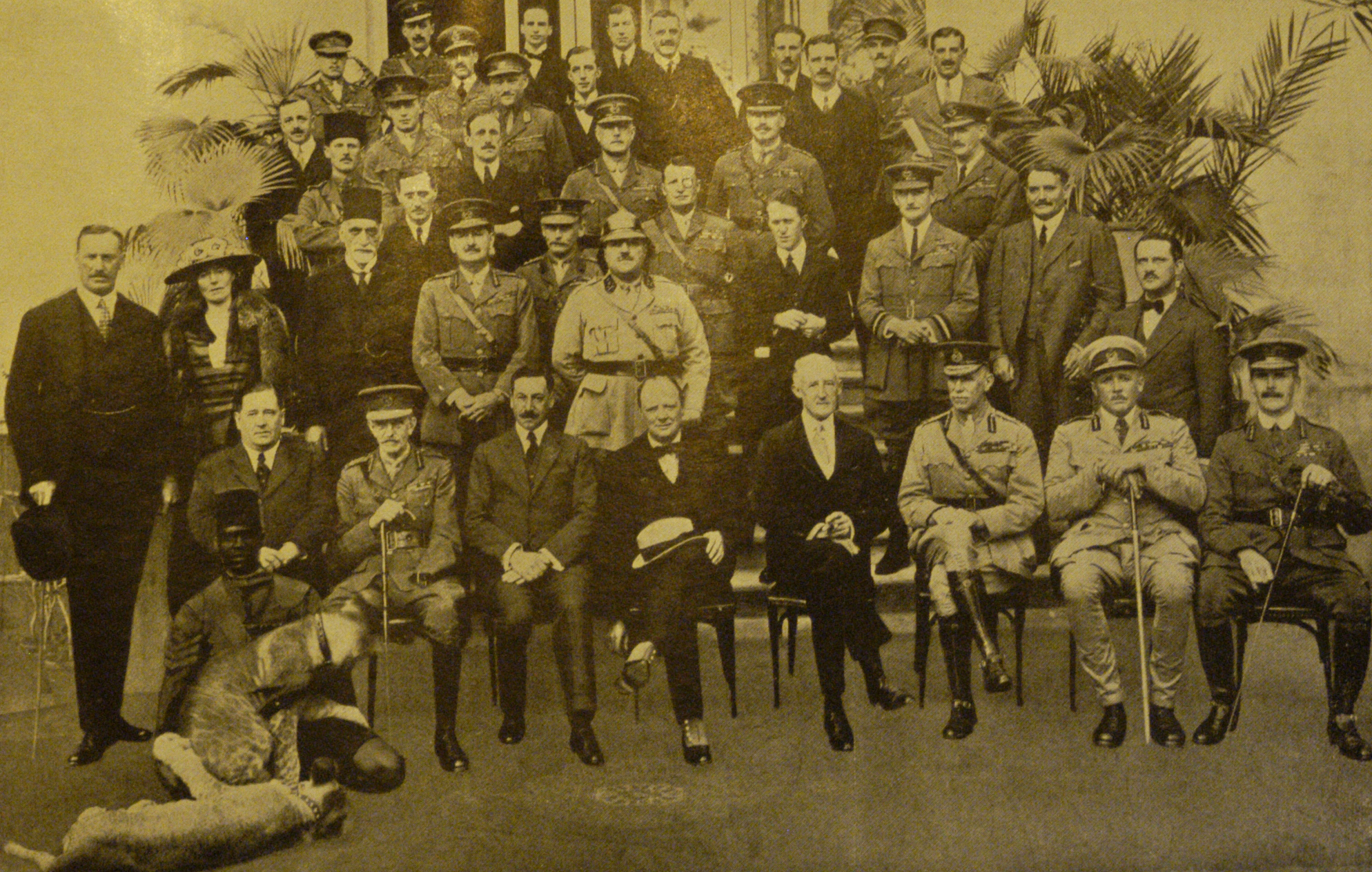
March 12–30, 1921: Britain's Cairo Conference determines future of Middle East

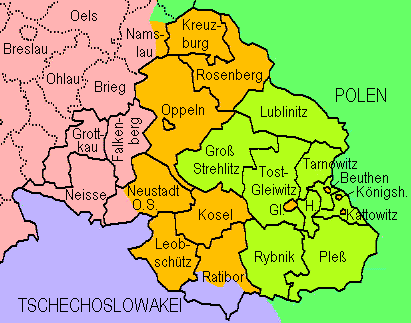
Voters in Upper Silesia cede territory to Germany (orange), Poland (green) and Czechoslovakia (purple)

The following events occurred in March 1921:

== March 1, 1921 (Tuesday) ==
- The Kronstadt rebellion began at the naval fortress at Kronstadt, located on the island of Kotlin in the Soviet Union outside of St. Petersburg.
- The results of the first census of the Japanese Empire showed 56,961,140 people in Japan, and 77,005,112 overall (which included Korea, Formosa and Sakhalin).
- At the London Reparations Conference, Foreign Minister Walter Simons made a counteroffer on behalf of Germany to pay reparations of 30 billion gold marks (equivalent to $7.5 billion U.S. dollars), based on 20 billion already paid against a revised debt of 50 billion. The Allied leaders, who had demanded an additional 226 billion gold marks ($56.5 billion), rejected the proposal.

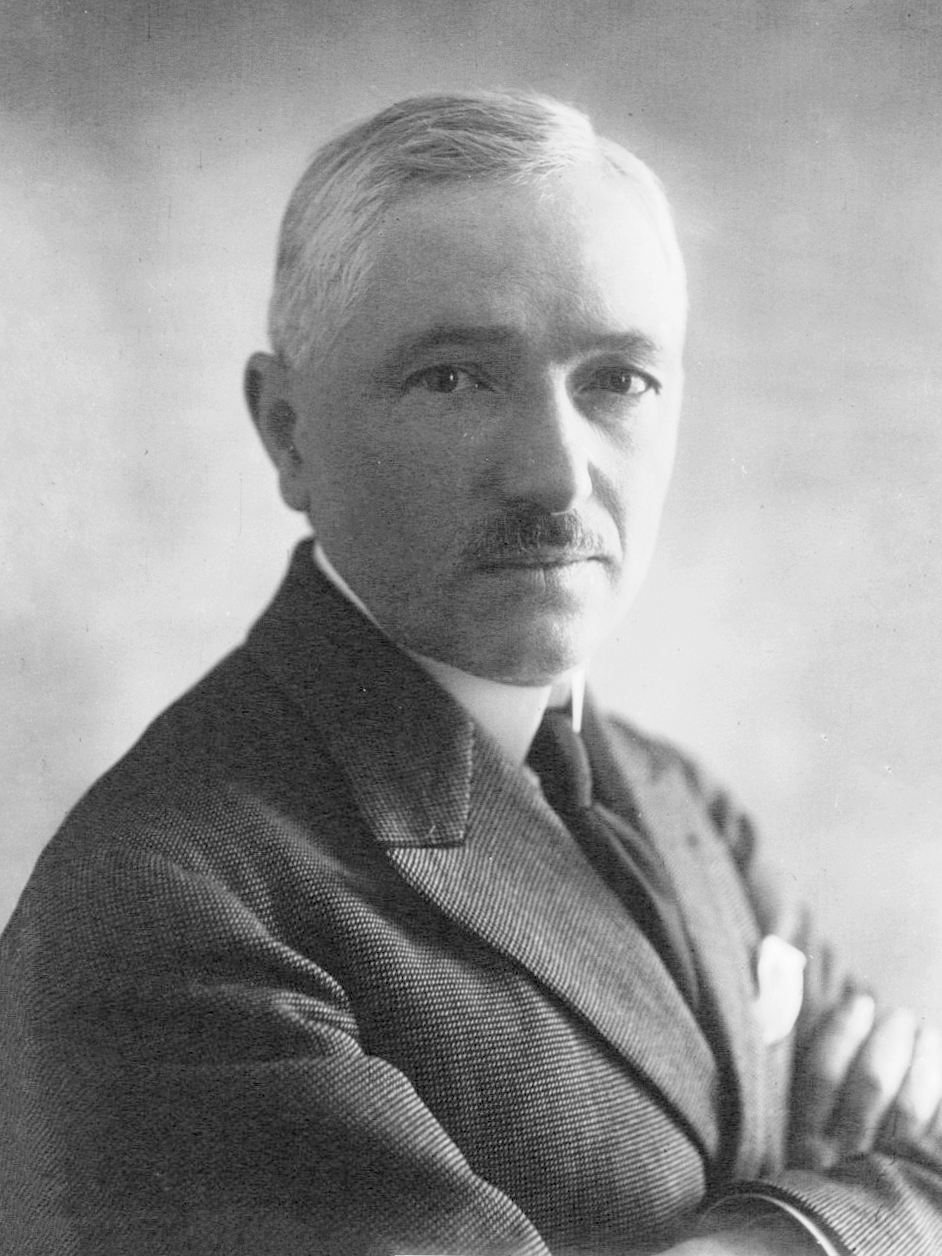
Jules Rimet

- Jules Rimet, the director of France's soccer football federation (the FFF) took office as the third president of FIFA, the Fédération Internationale de Football Association and would transform the governing body of the world's soccer football leagues during a 34-year administration lasting until 1954. During Rimet's regime, the World Cup would be created in 1930 to determine the soccer football champion of the world.
- Erle P. Halliburton received a patent for his process of controlling well drilling by the rapid injection of cement.
- Born: Richard Wilbur, American poet, United States Poet Laureate from 1987 to 1988, two-time Pulitzer Prize winner; in New York City (d. 2017)
- Died: Nicholas I of Montenegro, 79, first and only king of Montenegro from 1910 until the kingdom's union with Serbia in 1918 (b. 1841)

== March 2, 1921 (Wednesday) ==
- The Kronstadt rebellion saw the Kronstadt Fortress fall to the anti-Bolshevists in Petrograd.
- Abdullah, Prince of Mecca and the future King of Jordan, entered the Jordanian capital of Amman.
- The village of Colonie, New York, was incorporated in Albany County.
- Born:
  - Lykke Aresin, German physician and sexologist, in Bernburg, Saxony-Anhalt, German Reich (d. 2011)
  - Kenji Misumi, Japanese film director; in Kyoto, Empire of Japan (present-day Japan) (d. 1975)
  - Ernst Haas, Austrian-born American photojournalist; in Vienna, Austria (d. 1986)
- Died: Matthew D. Mann, 75, American surgeon who had operated on U.S. president William McKinley after the president was shot on September 6, 1901 (b. 1845)

== March 3, 1921 (Thursday) ==
- Almost 900 people died in the sinking of the Singapore ship SS Hong Moh as it approached Swatow after departing Hong Kong with 1,135 passengers and a crew of 48. At 7:20 in the evening, it struck the White Rocks. Rescue did not take place until March 5, after the ship had broken in two, and only 268 people survived.
- Congress passed a joint resolution declaring that the wartime emergency declared during World War I was over and repealed most of the emergency legislation passed in the U.S. during World War I, including the Sedition Act of 1918. President Wilson, on his last full day in office, signed the repeal of almost all of the "war laws" except for the creation of the War Finance Corporation and the sale of Liberty Bonds, and a prohibition against trading with the enemy nations.
- The Allied Prime Ministers delivered an ultimatum to Germany to accept, by March 7, the Allied reparations demand of 226 billion marks over 42 years, or face Allied occupation of western German cities.
- On the last full day of U.S. President Woodrow Wilson's term of office, the House of Representatives failed to get the two-thirds majority necessary to override the veto of the Fordney Emergency Tariff Bill, falling 11 votes short of the required number (201 in favor but 132 against).
- Poland and Romania signed their Convention on Defensive Alliance, pledging for five years to come to each other's defense in the event of an invasion.
- The Danish Institute of Theoretical Physics (now the Niels Bohr Institute) opened at the University of Copenhagen under the direction of physicist Niels Bohr.

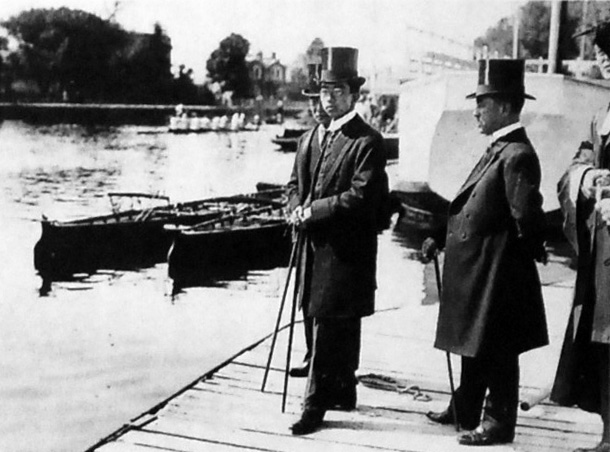
Prince Hirohito abroad

- Crown Prince Hirohito of Japan became the first member of Japanese royalty to depart the nation in more than 16 centuries. The Prince, future Emperor of Japan, boarded the battleship Katori at Yokohama on his voyage to Europe.
- The White House announced that outgoing U.S. President Woodrow Wilson and U.S. Secretary of State Bainbridge Colby would form a private law practice upon leaving public service. The statement from the White House said, "The President made the announcement today that at the conclusion of his term of office he would resume the practice of law, forming a partnership with the Secretary of State, Bainbridge Colby. The firm will have offices in New York and Washington." Wilson had graduated from the University of Virginia College of Law in 1881 but had not practiced law in more than 35 years.
- Born: Jean Paolini, French civil servant, prefect of police of Paris; in Ghisonaccia (d. 2015)
- Died: General Auguste Mercier, 87, former French Minister of War who prosecuted the Dreyfus affair and attempted to destroy exonerating evidence (b. 1833)

== March 4, 1921 (Friday) ==
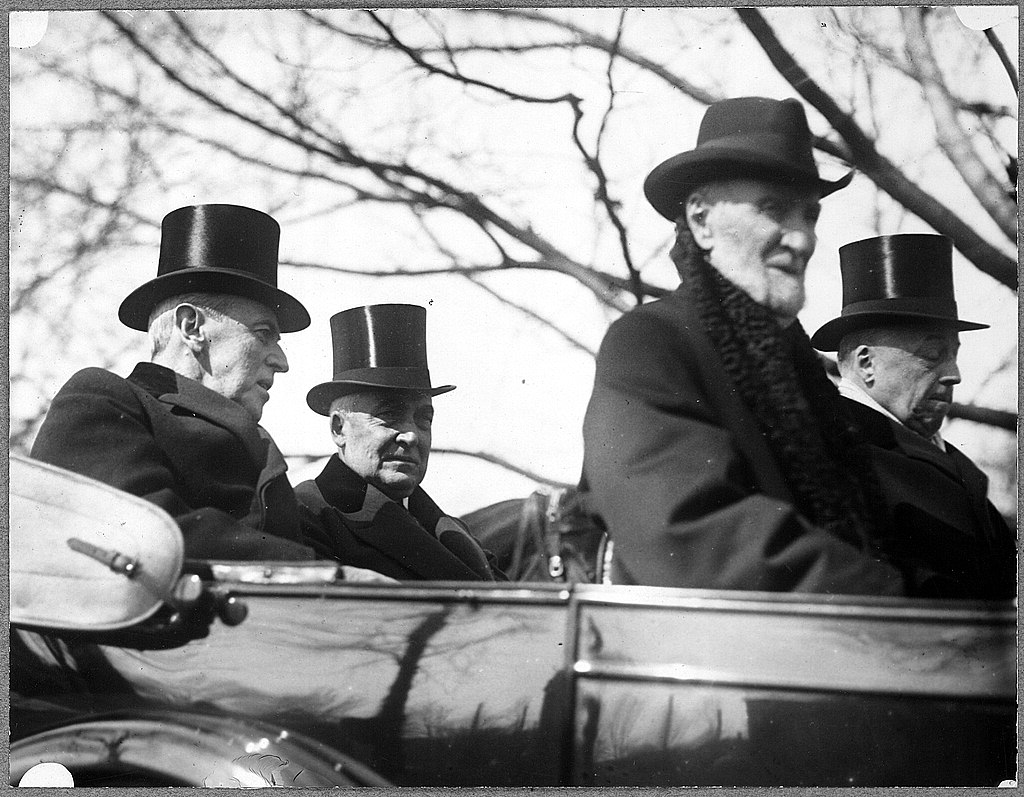
Woodrow Wilson and Warren G. Harding on the way to Harding's inauguration

- Warren G. Harding was inaugurated as the 29th President of the United States. The incoming Senate convened in a special session and confirmed all of Harding's cabinet nominations the same day. Outgoing President Wilson rode in a car with Harding to the Capitol and had walked with the assistance of a cane into the building, but was overcome with fatigue and returned to his new residence of 2340 S Street N.W. before the inauguration ceremony began.
- Soviet Red Army troops entered the city of Sukhumi within the Georgian republic and aided Bolshevik sympathizers in setting up the Abkhazian Soviet Socialist Republic.
- Troops of the Army of Costa Rica crossed into Panama and occupied the border town of Guabito.
- Harding County, New Mexico was created from portions of Union County and Mora County and was named in honor of the new president of the United States on the day of his inauguration.
- The new U.S. Congress voted to approve the creation of the first Tomb of the Unknown Soldier to house the remains of a member of the U.S. military who could not be identified. A member of the U.S. Army, who had been buried as an unknown casualty in France during World War I, was reinterred in Arlington National Cemetery on November 11, 1921.
- Born:
  - Jane Fawcett, British codebreaker and historical preservationist; as Janet Caroline Hughes, in London, England (d. 2016)
  - Ademilde Fonseca, Brazilian singer of choro music; in São Gonçalo do Amarante, Rio Grande do Norte, Brazil (d. 2012)

== March 5, 1921 (Saturday) ==
- Danilo Petrović-Njegoš, the former Crown Prince of Montenegro, pretender to the throne and leader of the government-in-exile, renounced his claim to the throne in favor of his 12-year-old nephew, Mihail Petrović-Njegoš.
- All 43 crew on the Belgian cargo ship Madimba died after the vessel collided with another Belgian vessel, the Italier, and sank in the North Sea.

== March 6, 1921 (Sunday) ==
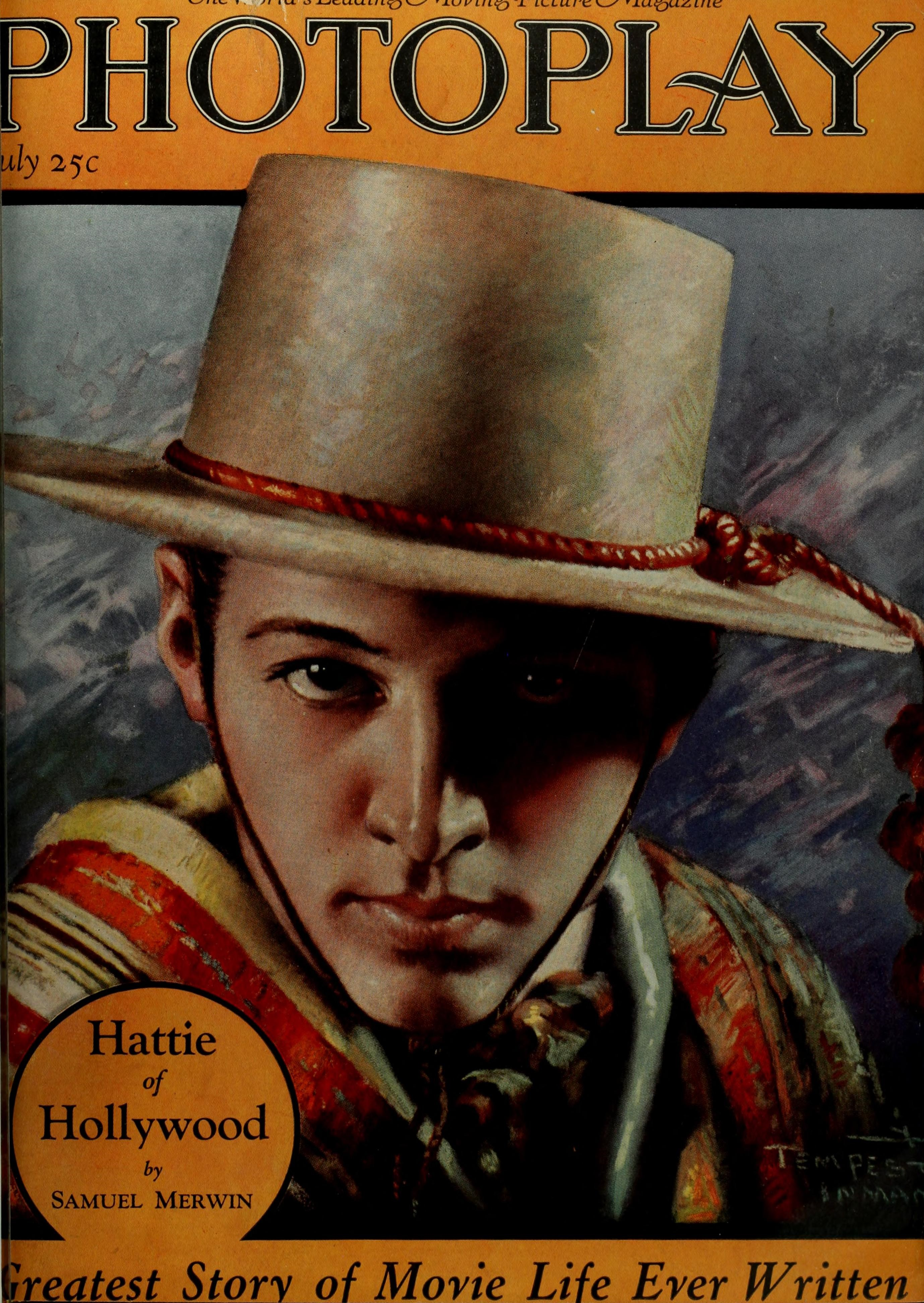
Rudolph Valentino on the cover of Photoplay

- Brigadier General H.R. Cumming of the British Army was ambushed and killed at West Cork in Ireland as he was on his way to preside over a court martial of IRA members. Cumming and his escort had just crossed from County Kerry into County Cork when the attack happened
- Germany responded to the Allied ultimatum by increasing its counteroffer of reparations to 90 billion gold marks over 30 years, and providing standardized housing materials for rebuilding damaged buildings in northern France.
- The Portuguese Communist Party was founded.
- The most popular film of the year in the U.S., The Four Horsemen of the Apocalypse, was released by Metro Pictures. Directed by Rex Ingram and starring Pomeroy Cannon, Rudolph Valentino and Beatrice Dominguez, the silent film ran for 2 hours and 14 minutes and grossed $4.5 million in domestic rentals.

== March 7, 1921 (Monday) ==
- Mayor George Clancy (Seoirse Mic Ḟlannċaḋa) of Limerick, Ireland, and his predecessor Michael O'Callaghan, were shot at their homes while they were sleeping, in reprisal for the murder of General Cumming.
- Born: Ruth "Bazy" Tankersley, American newspaper publisher as owner of the Washington Journal-Herald; as Ruth McCormick, in Chicago (d. 2013)
- Died: Paul M. Potter, 67, American playwright (b. 1853)

== March 8, 1921 (Tuesday) ==
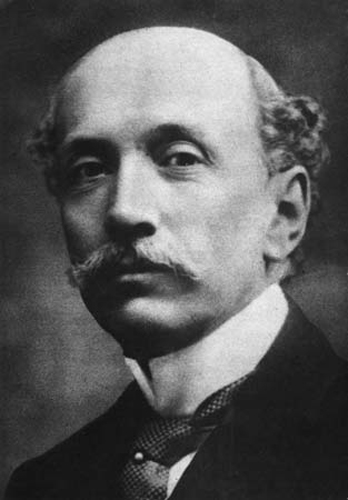
Spanish Prime Minister Eduardo Dato

- The assassination of Spain's Prime Minister Eduardo Dato led to Gabino Bugallal Araújo, a member of Dato's cabinet, serving as PM until Manuel Allendesalazar was appointed on March 13.
- At 7:00 in the morning, French Army and Belgian Army troops moved into the Ruhr Area in Germany to enforce reparations payments, taking up occupation in the cities of Düsseldorf, Duisburg and Ruhrort. No resistance was encountered as 10,000 French troops and 5,000 Belgian troops crossed the border, while the British Army sent two squadrons of cavalry to assist in the occupation of Düsseldorf. Notices, in German, were posted on all public buildings of a proclamation by France's General Jean Degoutte, with the statement that "This occupation constitutes in no fashion a measure of hostility toward the population. Under the reserve of strict observance of orders which the military authority will judge indispensable to promulgate there will be no interference with the economic life of the region."
- U.S. Secretary of War John W. Weeks announced that U.S. troops would continue to occupy the Rhineland in Germany, having been placed there during the Wilson administration.
- The 10th Congress of the Russian Communist Party opened in Moscow and lasted for nine days, ending on March 16.

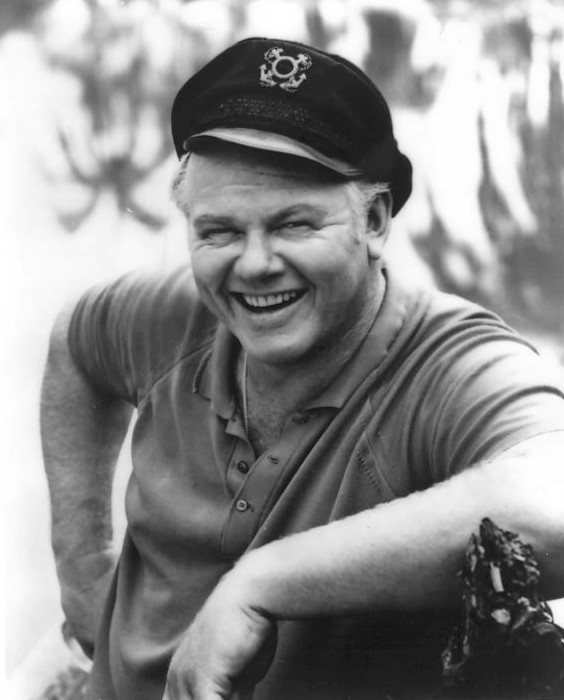
American actor Alan Hale Jr.

- Born:
  - Georg-Peter Eder, German Luftwaffe fighting ace with 78 shootdowns in World War II; in Oberdachstetten, Bavaria, Weimar Republic (present-day Germany) (d. 1986)
  - Alan Hale Jr., American film actor and TV comedian, best known for portraying the Skipper on the series Gilligan's Island; as Alan Hale MacKahan, in Los Angeles (d. 1990)
  - Svetislav Mandić, Yugoslavian and Serbian historian and author; in Mostar, Kingdom of Yugoslavia (present-day Bosnia and Herzegovina) (d. 2003)
- Died: Eduardo Dato, 64, Prime Minister of Spain; assassinated by three Catalonian terrorists who pulled up next to his car as he was being driven home following a session of parliament (b. 1856)

== March 9, 1921 (Wednesday) ==
- The two college basketball teams with the best win–loss record that played against each other during the 1920–1921 season, the 18 and 1 University of Pennsylvania Quakers and the 12 and 2 Penn State Nittany Lions faced each other at Weightman Hall on the Penn campus in Philadelphia. The game went into overtime after the teams were tied, 17 to 17, at the end of regulation. In extra time, the Lions' Horace "Pip" Koehler was fouled as he shot a successful field goal and, under the rules of the day, the designated free throw shooter, Wilson, was allowed two free throws even if the goal counted. Though Penn's Bill Grave made one long shot seconds later to close the gap to 21 to 19, the Penn State defense was able to prevent any more scoring to win the game. Nevertheless, the Helms Foundation would retroactively name Pennsylvania, which would win its last three games for a 21 and 2 record and had defeated most of its opponents by double digits, the best team of the season.

== March 10, 1921 (Thursday) ==
- Pittsburgh's KDKA-AM made the first live broadcast of a theatrical performance as it transmitted the sounds of an opera from the Davis Theater.
- Australia's Department of Health began operations, with Walter Massy-Greene as the first Health Minister.
- U.S. railroads announced that they would reduce wages to most employees by an average of 25 percent in order to save an estimated $600,000,000 per year.

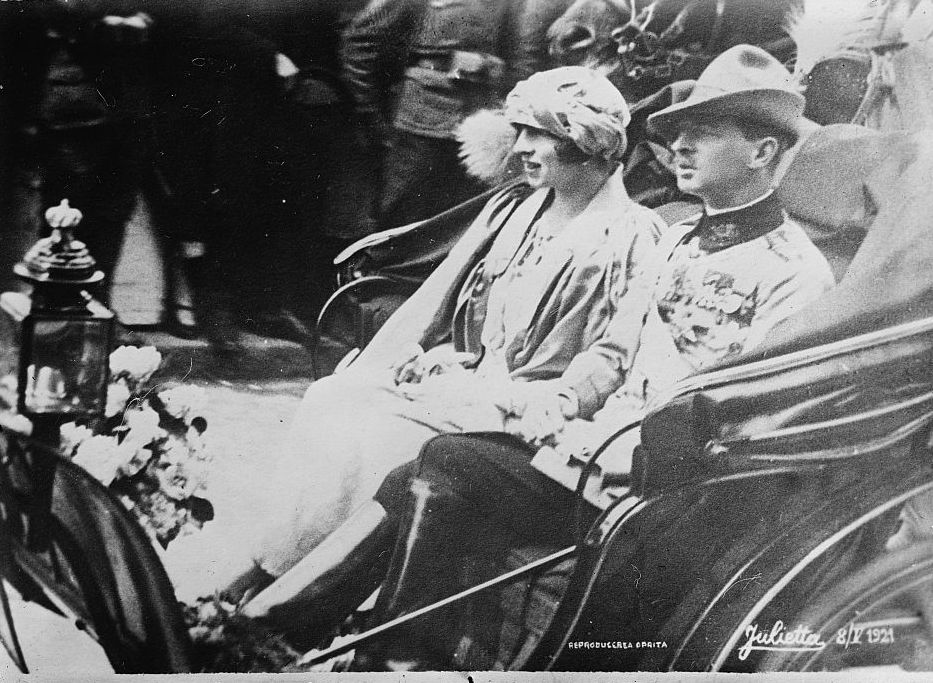
Princess Helen and Prince Carol

- In Athens, Princess Helen of Greece and Denmark, daughter of King Constantine of Greece married Crown Prince Carol of Romania, son of King Ferdinand. The marriage would produce a son, the future King Michael of Romania, but Prince Carol would abandon the family and renounce the throne in 1925.
- Theodore Roosevelt Jr., son of the 26th U.S. president, took office as the Assistant Secretary of the Navy during president Warren G. Harding's administration, taking on the same job that his father had had from 1897 to 1898 during William McKinley's administration.
- Born:
  - Ruth Reese, African American opera singer who became popular in Europe, later a celebrity in Norway; in Hayneville, Alabama (d. 1990)
  - René Marill, French literary critic who wrote under the name R. M. Albérès; in Perpignan, Pyrenees-Orientales departement (d. 1982)
- Died:
  - Florence L. Barclay, 58, British romance novelist; died while undergoing surgery (b. 1862)
  - Francis R. Upton, 68-69, American physicist and mathematician who assisted Thomas Edison in the development of electrical power distribution (b. 1852)
  - Pete Harrison, 36, English-born American major league baseball umpire, died from tuberculosis (b. 1885)

== March 11, 1921 (Friday) ==
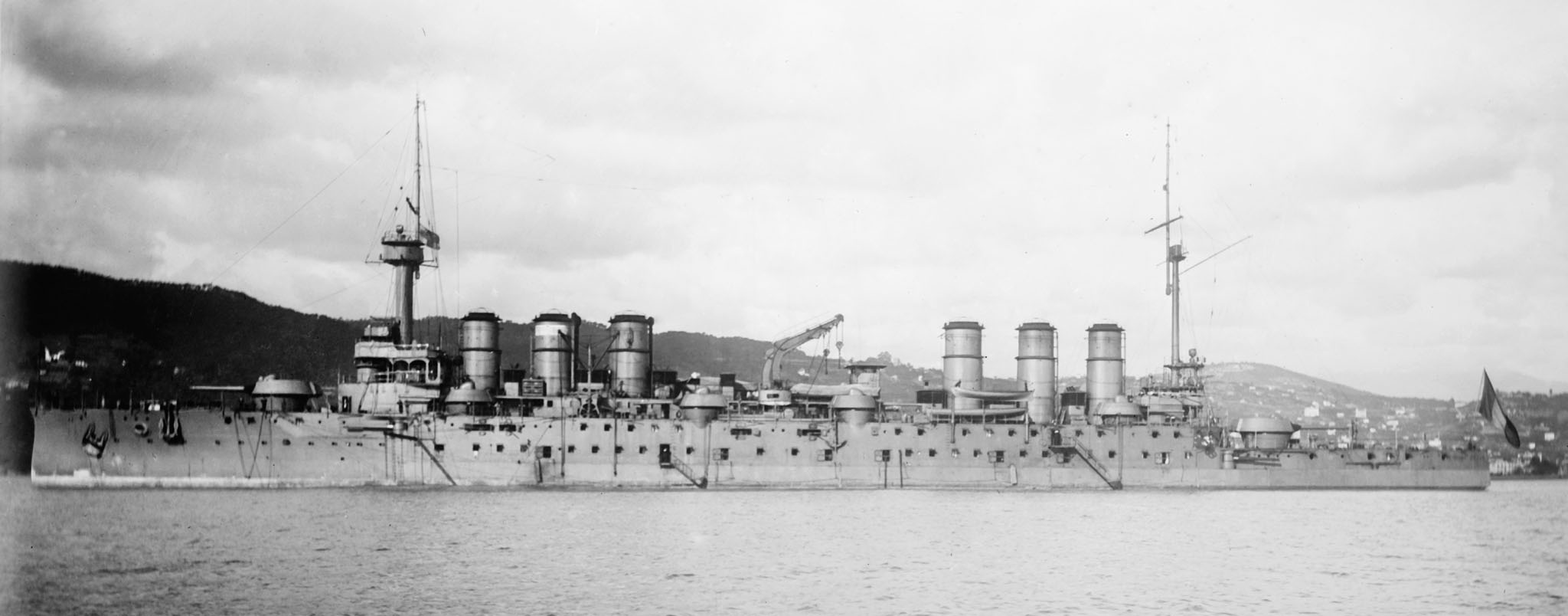
Le Ernest Renan

- With the conquest of the Democratic Republic of Georgia imminent, the French Navy cruiser Ernest Renan transported Georgia's gold reserves and church reserves out of the port of Batumi, for shipment to the Georgian government-in-exile in France.
- Died: S. W. Burnham, 82, American astronomer (b. 1838)

== March 12, 1921 (Saturday) ==
- The Middle East Conference held in Cairo and Jerusalem, convened by British Colonial Secretary Winston Churchill, opened in Cairo at the Semiramis Hotel to discuss the future of the British mandates in Mesopotamia and of Palestine. On March 24, the conference moved to Jerusalem and continued until March 30.
- After the failure of negotiations on reparations in London, Germany's Foreign Minister Walter Simons delivered his report to the Reichstag, which voted to approve his actions, 268 to 49.
- Following up on protests by its employees over the announcement of a wage cut, the Erie Railroad said that it would keep wages the same, but would lay off many of its employees.
- Born:
  - Mohammad Hashim Maiwandwal, Afghan politician, Prime Minister of Afghanistan from 1965 to 1967; in Kabul (d. 1973, murdered)
  - Nikolai Shchetinin, Soviet Army military officer and Hero of the Soviet Union for his bravery during World War II; in Mikhayevsky, Vologda Governorate, Russian SFSR, Soviet Union) (d. 1968)

== March 13, 1921 (Sunday) ==
- The Soviet Union established the provisional People's Government of Mongolia, a forerunner of the Mongolian People's Republic, with a capital at Altanbulag.
- Born:
  - Philippe Nguyễn Kim Điền, Vietnamese prelate, Roman Catholic Archbishop of Hue from 1947 until his death; in Long Đức, French Cochinchina, French Indochina (present-day Vietnam) (d. 1988)
  - General Karl Lennart Ljung, Swedish Army officer, served as the Supreme Commander of the Swedish Armed Forces from 1978 to 1986; in Sollefteå (d. 1990)
- Died: Jenny Twitchell Kempton, 85, American contralto opera singer (b. 1835)

== March 14, 1921 (Monday) ==
- The play A Bill of Divorcement, written by Clemence Dane as a West End theatre production, premiered in at St Martin's Theatre in London for the first of 402 performances. Lady Dane's futuristic social commentary, set 12 years in the future in a time when women would be allowed to file divorce proceedings, included in the program "The action passes on Christmas Day, 1933. The audience is asked to imagine that the recommendations of the Majority Report of the Royal Commission on Divorce v. Matrimonial Causes have become the law of the land."
- Died: Patrick Moran (33), Thomas Whelan (22), Frank Flood (19), Patrick Doyle (29), Thomas Bryan (24) and Bernard Ryan (20), all members of the Irish Republican Army, executed in prison in Dublin after being convicted of treason against the crown in a court martial. A crowd of 20,000 people gathered outside the prison walls to pray for the men.

== March 15, 1921 (Tuesday) ==
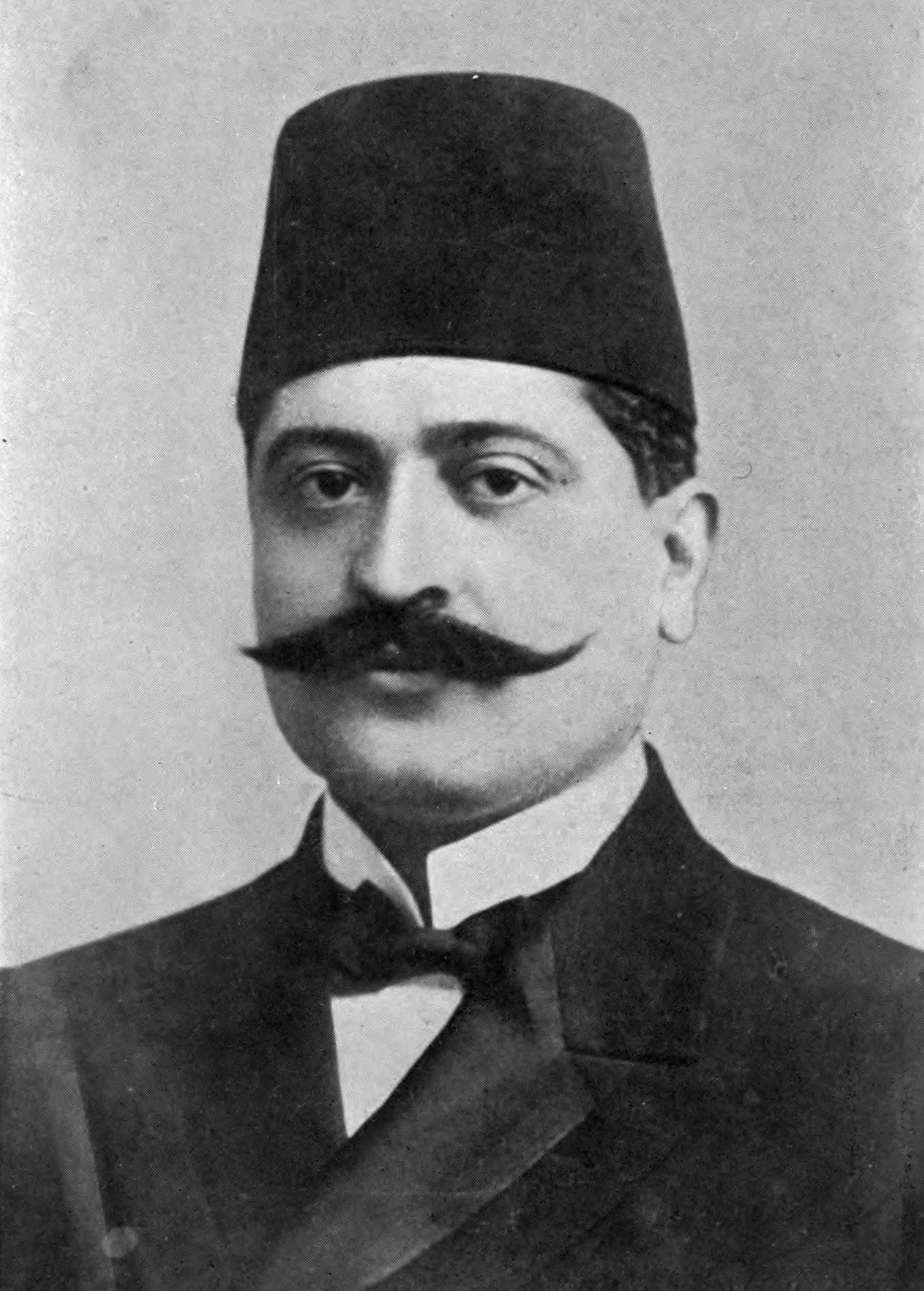
Talaat Pasha

- Former Ottoman Grand Vizier Talaat Pasha, the leader of the Young Turks party and identified as a war criminal by the Allied Commission, was assassinated in Berlin by an Armenian student in reprisal for the 1916 genocide. Talaat, one of the three leaders of the Young Turk Movement, had been walking with his wife when the assassin, who had been following the couple, tapped him on the shoulder, claimed to be a friend, and then shot both of them with a revolver. Shot through the head, Talaat died instantly. The assassin, Soghomon Tehlirian, was seized by witnesses until police could arrive.

== March 16, 1921 (Wednesday) ==
- The Treaty of Moscow was signed between the Grand National Assembly of Turkey and the Soviet Union.
- The 10th Congress of the Russian Communist Party adjourned with the adoption of numerous closing resolutions. Grigory Zinoviev, a protege of Vladimir Lenin, was made a full member of the party's Politburo and became the chief rival to Joseph Stalin for control of the Party after Lenin's death.
- The Bolshevik government in the Armenian SSR was overthrown in Yerevan.
- The Allied Reparations Commission demanded that Germany pay one billion gold marks by March 23, and 12 billion marks by May 1, as its first installment of reparation payments. Germany responded on March 23 that it could not afford to pay the installment even if it felt it was owed.
- The Anglo-Soviet Trade Agreement was signed as the United Kingdom became the first western nation to decide to begin commercial relations with the Bolshevik government.
- The Soviet Union recognized the government of the Republic of Turkey and recognized Istanbul as the capital.
- The U.S. government issued an order forbidding U.S. armed forces personnel from wearing their military uniforms while participating in the St. Patrick's Day scheduled the next day in Boston. The troops were celebrating Evacuation Day at the same time that American supporters of Irish independence were celebrating St. Patrick.
- Baseball team owner Charles Comiskey sent formal notices of unconditional release to the eight former Chicago White Sox players charged in the "Black Sox Scandal." Comiskey had indefinitely suspended the eight men on September 26. By 1921, only two of the players were still under contract with the White Sox for 1921— Shoeless Joe Jackson and Buck Weaver.

== March 17, 1921 (Thursday) ==
- The Kronstadt rebellion was suppressed by the Soviet government as the 60,000 troops of the Seventh Red Army retook control of the fortress at 2:00 in the afternoon. The surviving members of the remaining garrison of about 10,000 Soviet Navy sailors and 5,000 soldiers either surrendered or fled towards the border with Finland. Roughly 800 soldiers arrived in Helsinki by the end of the day. Before evacuating to safety, the Kronstadt Revolutionary Committee destroyed the Soviet Navy warships Petropavlovsk and Sebastopol.
- Bonar Law resigned as Leader of the Opposition in the British House of Commons.
- Organized crime mob enforcer Albert Anastasia was convicted of the murder of a longshoreman, George Turino, and sentenced to be executed at the Sing Sing State Prison in Ossining, New York. Due to a legal technicality, however, the conviction would be reversed and Anastasia won the right to a new trial in 1922. Before he could be tried again, four of the original prosecution witnesses would disappear, and Anastasia would be released from prison.
- Radio station 9JR began broadcasting in the railroad junction town of Tuscola, Illinois, initially with the concept of broadcasting current grain price information to subscribing customers.
- Negotiators for the Bolshevik Soviet government and the Menshevik Georgian government negotiated a ceasefire effectively clearing the way for the Soviet Army to take over the rest of Georgia while allowing the government leaders to safely evacuate to France. Georgia's Defense Minister Grigol Lordkipanidze and Soviet Communist representative Avel Enukidze concluded the agreement in Kutaisi.
- The parliament of Poland adopted a new Constitution, to take effect on June 1 and to formally declare Poland to be a republic governed by a president.
- Died: Frank W. Gunsaulus, 65, American Congregationalist minister and educator who founded the Armour Institute in 1893 by persuading meatpacking magnate Philip Danforth Armour, Sr. to donate the money. Armour Institute would merge with Lewis Institute in 1940 to create the Illinois Institute of Technology (b. 1856)

== March 18, 1921 (Friday) ==
- The Peace of Riga was signed between Poland and the Soviet Union, bringing an end to the Polish–Soviet War on terms unfavorable to the Soviets, partitioning the territories in Belarus and Ukraine between Poland and the Soviet Union.
- In the wake of the recent destruction of its dirigible R-54 and a government decision to pursue development of airplanes rather than lighter-than-air aircraft, the British Air Service offered to give 10 of its largest dirigibles to any syndicate willing to operate them for research.
- The 1921 Grand National steeplechase was won by the only horse that did not fall during the race, Shaun Spadah, ridden by Dick Rees.
- Born:
  - Edgar Z. Friedenberg, American sociologist, author of The Vanishing Adolescent and Coming of Age in America; in New York City (d. 2000)
  - Józef Arkusz, Polish film director and producer of educational documentaries for Poland's government; in Peratyn, Tarnopol (d. 1995)
- Died: Concepción Lombardo, 85, widow of the former president of Mexico Miguel Miramón and the author of a bestselling memoir (b. 1835)

== March 19, 1921 (Saturday) ==
- The Crossbarry ambush, the largest battle of the Irish War of Independence by number of participants, took place near Crossbarry, County Cork as Tom Barry and 103 IRA volunteers fought their way out of being surrounded by a force of 1,200 British troops.
- In Chicago, a dust explosion at the world's largest grain elevator killed at least four Armour Company employees, shattered windows within a five-mile (eight-kilometer) radius from the intersection of 122nd Street and Torrence Avenue, and caused damage estimated at $10,000,000 (equivalent to $142,000,000 in 2020) including the destruction of 7.5 million bushels (roughly 190,000 metric tons) of corn. The grain elevator itself, owned by the Northwestern Terminal Company, was destroyed within seconds.
- Born: Tommy Cooper, Welsh comedian and magician who died on live television during a performance; in Caerphilly, Glamorgan (d. 1984)

== March 20, 1921 (Sunday) ==
- A plebiscite was held in Upper Silesia on whether to join Poland or remain part of Germany. From the German point of view, the outcome of the vote was considered critical because the loss of the territory would make it more difficult to meet the Allied Reparations Commission terms and lead to the collapse of the nation's industrial economy. The New York Times noted at the time that the fate "of the whole of Upper Silesia is not actually decided by the plebiscite. That is the task of the Supreme Council, which in making a decision has to have regard not only to the voice of the population, but also the geographical and economic conditions of administration. The plebiscite results present them with a puzzle requiring all their wit and ingenuity to solve." Based on the results of individual towns and villages, the Council provided for most of Silesia to remain part of Germany, though the eastern section went to Poland and a southwestern section (including Hultschin/Hlučín) already ceded to Czechoslovakia.

== March 21, 1921 (Monday) ==
- Soviet Russia implemented its New Economic Policy (Novaya Ekonomicheskaya Politika or NEP) by decree of Vladimir Lenin and the All-Russian Communist Party. The system was described as a free-market economy under the control of the state. The NEP included a new tax on food production, the prodovolstvenniy nalog, abbreviated to prodnalog. Western observers expressed doubt about Lenin's sincerity. After Lenin's death, Joseph Stalin would abandon the NEP in favor of a transition to collectivization of agriculture and a shift to industrialization.
- At Batumi, the Constituent Assembly of Georgia held its last session and voted to abandon the country to the Bolshevik invaders.
- The Mandate for Palestine was amended by Britain to provide for a Palestinian kingdom of Transjordan on the opposite side of the Jordan River from the Zionist state proposed in 1918.
- Austen Chamberlain was elected to succeed Bonar Law as Leader of the Opposition in the British House of Commons.
- The Headford Ambush took place as the Irish Republican Army stopped and attacked a train carrying a regiment of 30 of the British Army's Royal Fusiliers, killing nine of them. The Headford Junction was located in County Kerry near Killarney.
- Born: Vasily Stalin, Soviet general and the son of Joseph Stalin, whose titles were stripped from him after Stalin's death in 1953; in Moscow, Russian SFSR, Soviet Union) (d. 1962)

== March 22, 1921 (Tuesday) ==
- The U.S. Navy airship A-5597 departed the Pensacola Naval Air Station on a training mission and sent its last report a few hours later from a point 20 miles off shore from St. Andrews Bay. The crew was not seen again, although the wreckage of the gondola was found on April 8.
- U.S. president Harding called a special session of Congress for April 11.
- A court in Germany convicted two American bounty hunters of false arrest in their attempt to pick up fugitive American Grover Bergdoll. Germany released the two men on March 31.
- The Turkish National Movement adopted "İstiklal Marşı" ("The Independence March") as Turkey's national anthem.
- Died: E. W. Hornung, 54, English author, creator of the "A.J. Raffles" series of novels (b. 1866)

== March 23, 1921 (Wednesday) ==
- In Ireland, 28 Irish Republicans were killed and 33 wounded in reprisals by British forces.
- The Second Battle of İnönü began as Greece made an assault on Turkey after the failure of the parties to agree at the London Conference.
- Drilling began at Signal Hill, California for the Alamitos #1 oil well and would strike oil on June 23.
- Died: Jean Paul Laurens, 82, French painter (b. 1838)

== March 24, 1921 (Thursday) ==
- In an event "said to be unprecedented in Federal prison annals," convicted Socialist politician Eugene V. Debs was released temporarily from the federal prison in Atlanta to travel, unguarded, to Washington DC, so that he could present his case for a presidential pardon to U.S. Attorney General Harry Daugherty. The furlough from prison, granted by the federal prison warden with the permission of President Harding and Daugherty, allowed Debs to travel "on his own personal recognizance and on his word that he would come direct to Washington and return to prison immediately after the conference." After arriving by train at 10:00 in the morning, dressed in a regular suit, Debs conferred privately with the Attorney General for a little more than three hours, then left "at 3:30 o'clock with the understanding that he would return at once to Atlanta." Debs reported back to the Atlanta federal prison the next afternoon, where he still had seven years remaining on a ten-year sentence. In December, Harding granted Debs a presidential pardon.
- The Tribunals of Inquiry (Evidence) Act 1921 was given royal assent and took effect immediately, providing for special tribunals to be set up by the British Secretary of State for criminal investigations.
- Thirty-one people were killed and 100 injured when a nitroglycerin bomb exploded in Milan at the Kursaal Diana, where a crowd of theatre goers was watching a performance of the operetta Die blaue Mazur by Franz Lehár.
- Rioting by German Communists in Eisleben and in Hettstadt killed 30 people near Hamburg. The Communist uprising was halted entirely by March 26.
- Born:
  - Franciszek Blachnicki, Polish Roman Catholic priest and founder of the Light-Life Movement; in Rybnik, Second Polish Republic (d. 1987)
  - Karl-Wilhelm Hofmann, German Luftwaffe fighter ace with 44 shootdowns in World War II; in Reichelsheim, Germany) (d. 1945, killed in action)
  - Sam McAughtry, Northern Irish writer; in Belfast, Ireland (present-day Northern Ireland) (d. 2014)
- Died: James Gibbons, 86, American Catholic prelate, served as the Archbishop of Baltimore, the second American to ever be selected as Roman Catholic Cardinal (b. 1834)

== March 25, 1921 (Friday) ==
- The U.S. Navy tugboat USS Conestoga departed for sea for the last time, leaving the Mare Island Naval Base north of San Francisco with a crew of 56 on a voyage to San Diego. The wreckage of the ship would be discovered 88 years later 20 miles (32 km) west of California and the U.S. Navy would confirm that USS Conestoga had been found on March 25, 2016, the 95th anniversary of its disappearance.
- U.S. Secretary of State Charles Evans Hughes replied to a March 22 request by the Soviet Union for a trade agreement, stating that the U.S. would not resume relations until "a regime of productive order" was established in Moscow. Secretary Hughes commented that the U.S. government "views with deep sympathy and grave concern the plight of the people of Russia" but added that "It is manifest to this Government that in existing circumstances there is no assurance for the development of trade." Hughes added that "if fundamental changes are contemplated, involving due regard for the protection of persons and property and the establishment of conditions essential to the maintenance of commerce, this Government will be glad to have convincing evidence of the consummation of such changes, and until this evidence is supplied this Government is unable to perceive that there is any proper basis for considering trade relations."

== March 26, 1921 (Saturday) ==
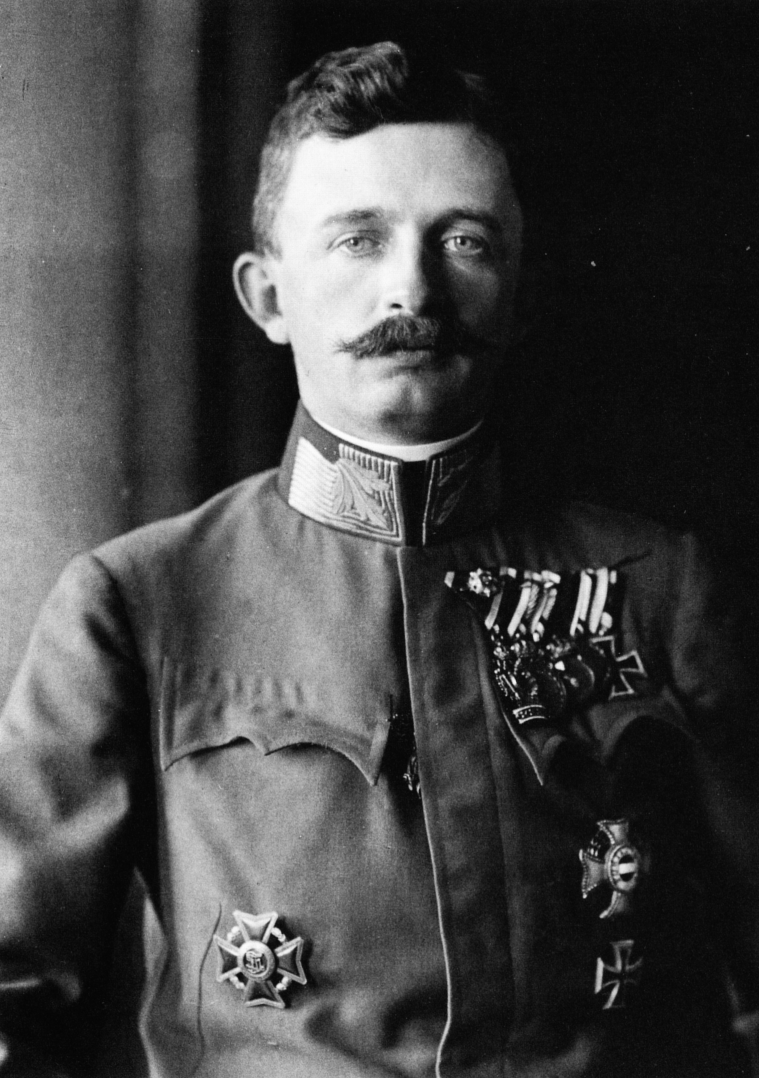
Former Emperor Karl I, King Karoly IV

- Charles of Austria-Hungary, the last Emperor of Austria (as Karl I) and the last King of Hungary (as Károly IV) made an attempt on the day before Easter Sunday to retake the throne, entering the country under a forged Spanish passport and arriving at Szombathely undetected.
- In its war against Turkey, the Greek Army captured Adapazarı as it moved into the mountains. They captured Afyonkarahisar (Nikopolis) on March 28 and Eskişehir (historically Dorylaeum) on March 30.
- Nine African Americans were found murdered in Jasper County, Georgia, prompting an investigation by the state.
- Died: Asharam Dalichand Shah, 79, Indian linguist and literary professor who worked on preserving the Gujarati language and culture (b. 1842)

== March 27, 1921 (Sunday) ==
- A fire in Tokyo destroyed 1,000 buildings and caused $12.5 million in damages.
- Died: Mouha ou Hammou Zayani, 63-64 or 57-58, Moroccan Berber military leader, Qaid of the Zayanes, was killed in battle against his son at Azelag N'Tazemourte (b. 1857 or 1863)

== March 28, 1921 (Monday) ==
- Australia's Department of Civil Aviation began operations as a branch of the Australian Department of Defence as the Air Navigation and Transport Act went into effect throughout the British Commonwealth.
- Nevada became the first U.S. state to provide for capital punishment by the gas chamber, instead of the previous punishment of allowing the prisoner to choose between hanging or a firing squad.
- The first international soccer football match played by what is now the Indonesia national football team, took place in Batavia (now Jakarta) when a team representing the Dutch East Indies defeated Singapore, 1 to 0.
- Born:
  - Harold Agnew, American nuclear physicist; in Denver (d. 2013)
  - William B. Macomber Jr., American diplomat and the first full time president of the Metropolitan Museum of Art; in Rochester, New York (d. 2003)
  - Norman Bluhm, American abstract expressionist painter; in Chicago (d. 1999)
- Died:
  - C. Haddon Chambers, 60, Australian-born British playwright (b. 1860)
  - José López Rodríguez, Cuban entrepreneur and multi-millionaire, committed suicide.

== March 29, 1921 (Tuesday) ==
- Charles IV, the last monarch of Austria-Hungary, returned to Budapest from his exile in Switzerland in an effort to regain his throne as King of Hungary, and conferred with the regent, Admiral Nicholas Horthy.
- Britain's leftist Independent Labour Party voted, 521 to 97, to reject the 21 points demanded by the Communist Party of the Soviet Union for membership in Comintern.
- The Republic of China signed a contract with the Federal Telegraph Company of the U.S. to build the most powerful radio station in the world.
- Born: R. E. Martadinata, Indonesian Navy admiral and diplomat, co-founder of the Indonesian Navy; as Eddy Martadinata, in Bandung, West Java, Dutch East Indies (present-day Indonesia) (d. 1966, killed in helicopter crash)
- Died: John Burroughs, 83, American naturalist and author (b. 1837)

== March 30, 1921 (Wednesday) ==
- The Cairo Conference, held initially in Cairo, Egypt and then in the British Mandate of Palestine, came to a close in Jerusalem.

== March 31, 1921 (Thursday) ==
- The Royal Australian Air Force was founded from the Australian Air Corps branch of the Australian Army. Initially called the Australian Air Force, the prefix "Royal" was added on August 31 by order of King George V.
- The Socialist Soviet Republic of Abkhazia was formed after the Soviet conquest of the Democratic Republic of Georgia, with a capital at Sukhumi. In December, the Abkhazia SSR would be united with the Georgian SSR.
- A state of emergency was declared in the United Kingdom after English coal miners went on strike over wage reductions.
