= February 1921 =

Month of 1923

<<	February 1921					>>
Su	Mo	Tu	We	Th	Fr	Sa
		1	2	3	4	5
6	7	8	9	10	11	12
13	14	15	16	17	18	19
20	21	22	23	24	25	26
27	28

The following events occurred in February 1921

== February 1, 1921 (Tuesday) ==
- Germany's Foreign Minister Walter Simons said in a speech to the Reichstag that Germany would not accept the Allied Council resolution for reparations, and said that his government was working on counterproposals.
- The Bengal Legislative Council was inaugurated in Calcutta by the Duke of Connaught, the uncle of King George V of the United Kingdom, as the first advisory council of India representatives for the Bengal Province of British India.
- Born: Peter Sallis, English actor, known for his roles as Norman Clegg in Last of the Summer Wine and Wallace in Wallace and Gromit; in Twickenham, Middlesex (d. 2017)

== February 2, 1921 (Wednesday) ==
- In the Clonfin Ambush, "The first major IRA attack with what we would now recognise as an IED with sufficient explosive power to bring the fight to a quick result" the Irish Republican Army detonated an improvised explosive device to stop two truckloads of the Royal Irish Constabulary auxiliary and then to fire on them. In the fight that followed at Clonfin in County Longford, four of the 19 RIC men were killed and eight wounded, and further ambushes using IEDs followed.
- The British-registered ship Esperanza de Larrinaga departed from Norfolk, Virginia on a voyage to Reggio Calabria in Italy, but never arrived. On the same day, the Italian steamship Monte San Michele left New York with a cargo of grain to ship to Genoa and was not seen again. The search for both ships, as well as the freighter Ottawa, would be abandoned after more than two months after searchers concluded that the vessels had been lost with all hands.
- Born: Hyacinthe Thiandoum, Senegalese Roman Catholic Cardinal and the Archbishop of Dakar from 1962 to 2000; in Poponguine (d. 2004)
- Died:
  - Andrea Carlo Ferrari, 70, Italian Roman Catholic Cardinal and the Archbishop of Milan from 1894 until his death; died of throat cancer (b. 1850)
  - Antonio Jacobsen, 70, Danish-born American maritime artist (b. 1850)

== February 3, 1921 (Thursday) ==
- An ambush by the Irish Republican Army killed 17 policemen in Queenstown in County Cork. On the same day at Burgatia, 500 Sinn Feiners fought a pitched battle against the constabulary.
- Thirty-six unemployed workers and six Chilean Army soldiers were killed in a clash with a larger number of unemployed workmen at the nitrate factory at San Gregorio.
- U.S. President Woodrow Wilson, at the request of President-Elect Warren G. Harding, called a special session of the U.S. Senate to begin on the morning of the March 4 presidential Inauguration Day to approve Harding's appointments for a new cabinet.
- Born: George E. Felton, British computer scientist who developed the GEORGE series of operating systems; in Paris (d. 2019)

== February 4, 1921 (Friday) ==
- Germany had been preparing in 1918 to bomb New York City with the Airship L-72, U.S. Army Brigadier General Billy Mitchell testified before the U.S. House Naval Affairs Committee, and the ship was "ready to make the trip when the Armistice was signed." "I believe that it could have attacked New York City with success," General Mitchell told the committee. "It was designed to fly at a height of 30,000 feet (9,100 m), thus making it virtually immune from attacks by airplanes on its trip here." Mitchell added that the U.S. Army was working on producing a similar weapon. L-72 was surrendered to France as part of German disarmament, and renamed the Dixmude.
- Dimitrios Rallis resigned as Prime Minister of Greece after a disagreement with his Minister of War, Dimitrios Gounaris over going to war with Turkey.
- Lonnie Eaton, an African American convicted of murder, was scheduled to be executed in Monroe, Louisiana, but Ouachita Parish Sheriff T. A. Grant forgot to carry out the hanging and nobody reminded him of the Governor's death warrant. Four days later, the embarrassed sheriff notified Governor John M. Parker and asked what he should do. On April 22, Governor Parker commuted Eaton's sentence to life in prison upon recommendation of the state board of pardons.
- Japan's War Minister, Count Tanaka Giichi, announced that another division of troops would be sent to its Governorate of Chosen, the Japanese Empire's Korea territory.
- Born:
  - Betty Friedan, American feminist and women's rights pioneer whose 1963 book The Feminine Mystique launched the "women's lib" movement in the 1960s; as Bettye Naomi Goldstein, in Peoria, Illinois (d. 2006)
  - K. R. Narayanan, President of India from 1997 to 2002 (his official birthdate was listed as October 27, 1920 because of a mistake by his uncle); as Kocheril Raman Narayanan, in Perumthanam, Travancore princely state, British India (now part of Uzhavoor, Kerala state) (d. 2005)

== February 5, 1921 (Saturday) ==
- Francis Burton Harrison, the U.S. Governor-General of the Philippines, transmitted his resignation by cable to U.S. President Wilson, to take effect on March 4.
- A train crash in Austria killed 25 people and seriously injured 40 more when a southbound freight train collided with an express train traveling north from Tarvisio in Italy to Vienna. The impact occurred near Felixdorf when both trains were on the same track approaching from opposite directions during a heavy snowfall.
- The Republic of Honduras became the first nation to approve the agreement to merge four nations into the Federation of Central American Republics. The deputies of the National Congress of Honduras voted unanimously in favor of reunification.
- Born: Zbigniew Czajkowski, Polish fencer, 1964 Olympic gold medalist, coach of Poland's fencing team; in Modlin (d. 2019)

== February 6, 1921 (Sunday) ==
- Elections were held for the parliament of the Union of South Africa, strengthening the majority of Prime Minister Jan Smuts and the South African Party (SAP), and temporarily ending General J. B. M. Hertzog's agitation for South Africa to secede from the British Empire. After having governed by a coalition with the Unionist Party since the 1920 election, the SAP won a majority on its own with 79 of the 134 seats in the Volksraad, the lower house of the South African Parliament.
- Nikolaos Kalogeropoulos was appointed as the new Prime Minister of Greece to replace Dimitrios Rallis. King Constantine appointed Kalogeropoulos shortly after midnight after conferring all day on Saturday with leaders of Rallis's party.
- The British freighter Ottawa made its last communication, in the middle of its voyage from Norfolk, Virginia in the U.S. to Manchester in the UK. The Ottawa was never heard from again and presumed to have been lost with all hands.
- The palace of Archbishop of Mexico City José Mora y del Río was struck by a bomb.

== February 7, 1921 (Monday) ==
- The Army Reduction Resolution, calling for the U.S. Army to be reduced to 175,000 soldiers, passed by Congress and then vetoed by U.S. President Wilson, became effective as both Houses of Congress voted overwhelmingly to override the veto. The House voted 271 to 16 to override on February 5, and the Senate followed suit, 67 to 1.
- Italy's Foreign Minister, Count Carlo Sforza, announced that the Allied Supreme Council was reducing the amount expected from Germany to pay for Allied occupation of the Rhineland by 83% to only 240 million gold marks (12 million pounds sterling or 47 million U.S. dollars), a savings equivalent of $300 million per year, to be made up for by the 12% tax on German exports.

== February 8, 1921 (Tuesday) ==
- Germany's Chancellor Constantin Fehrenbach accepted the invitation to attend the March 1 meeting of the Allied Premiers at the Reparations Conference in London.
- Born:
  - Lana Turner, American film actress and model; as Julia Jean Turner, in Wallace, Idaho (d. 1995)
  - Nexhmije Hoxha, Albanian Communist politician and the wife of Albanian leader Enver Hoxha; as Nexhmije Xhuglini, in Bitola, Kingdom of Serbs, Croats and Slovenes (present-day North Macedonia) (d. 2020)
  - Hans Albert, German philosopher; in Köln, Weimar Republic (present-day Germany) (d. 2023)
- Died:
  - George Formby, 45, English stage comedian and singer (b. 1875)
  - Peter Kropotkin, 78, Russian anarchist (b. 1842)

== February 9, 1921 (Wednesday) ==
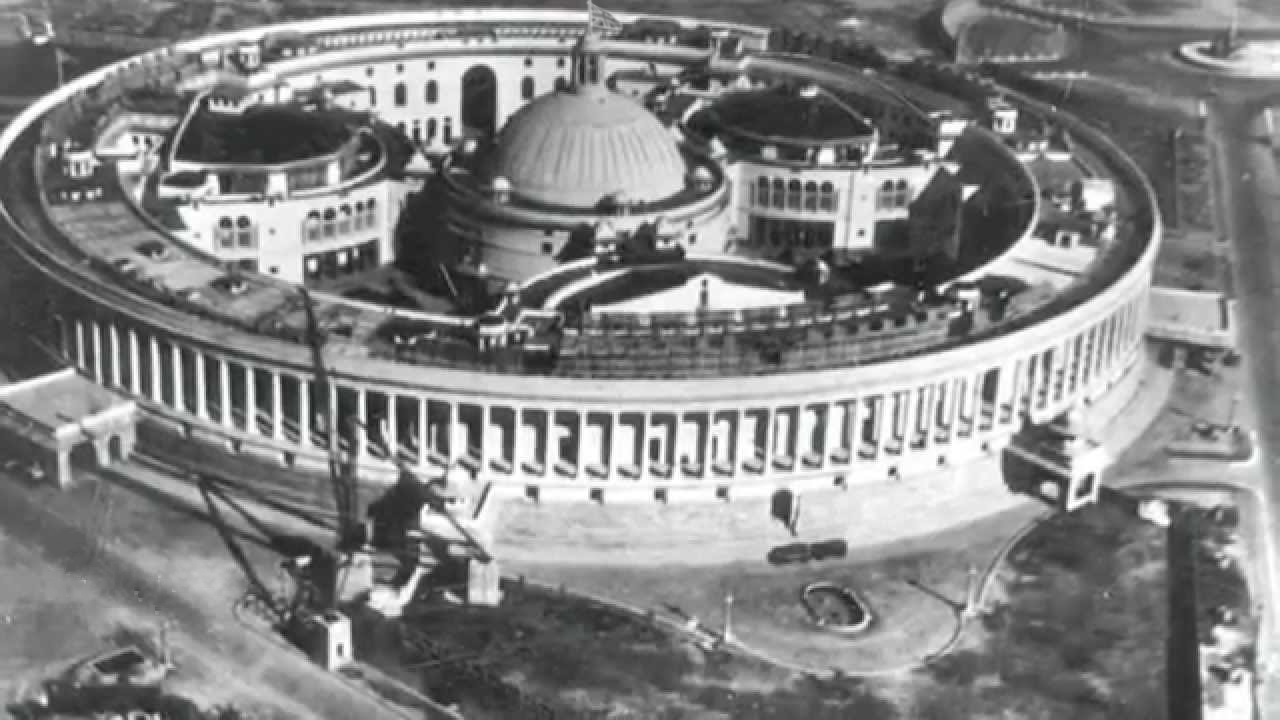
Parliament House in New Delhi

- The Indian Legislative Assembly and the Indian Council of State, national advisory bodies composed of representatives of the natives of India (which included what are now India, Pakistan and Bangladesh), were inaugurated in New Delhi by the Duke of Connaught. The advisory body was the first ever to be elected in British India. Of the 104 seats in the Legislative assembly, 66 were elected by Indian voters and 38 were selected for Europeans by the Chambers of Commerce throughout the subcontinent. The 34-member Council of State had 24 elected seats and 10 reserved (three for Europeans, five for Muslims, one for Sikhs and one for the United Provinces).
- France's Chamber of Deputies voted its confidence in the government of Prime Minister Aristide Briand and his policy toward reparations from Germany, by a margin of 387 to 125. The Chamber also ratified the restructured offer for reducing German reparations by a margin of 395 to 83.
- A joint session of Congress confirmed the results of the United States Electoral College, certifying the election of Warren G. Harding as President of the United States and Calvin Coolidge as vice president by a 404 to 127 margin.

== February 10, 1921 (Thursday) ==
- Thirty-two people were killed as a tornado swept through the African American town of Gardner in Washington County, Georgia, and 40 injured. Over 100 people were left homeless by the twister, that swept through the settlement shortly after 12:00 noon. All but two of the persons killed were African American, and the Red Cross provided the relief efforts for the injured and the homeless.
- Japan's House of Representatives voted 38 in favor and 245 against a proposal by opposition leader Yukio Ozaki to reduce the number of new ships to be built for the Imperial Japanese Navy.

== February 11, 1921 (Friday) ==
- The first interview with the former Kaiser Wilhelm II of Germany, since his abdication at the end of World War I, was published worldwide by United Press, which had bought the exclusive rights. A few months earlier, Dutch journalist Heinrich Petermeyer had been granted a brief meeting with the former German Emperor outside of Amerongen Castle in the Netherlands. The Kaiser opined that Germany's citizenry had "betrayed itself, its God and me", that "we would never have lost the war if the German people had remained true to themselves" and that since his betrayal, "notice how God scourges the whole world."
- The largest ocean liner up to that time, Germany's SS Bismarck, was purchased from the Allies by the White Star Line, after being surrendered to the United Kingdom as part of the German reparations. Renamed RMS Majestic, the Bismarck had been launched in 1914 but was never used by Germany's Hamburg-American Line because of World War One, and became part of the ships given up by Germany under the terms of the Treaty of Versailles.
- An uprising in the Menshevik-controlled Democratic Republic of Georgia, incited by Soviet Bolsheviks, began in the primarily Armenian populated Lori Province, and was portrayed in the Russian press as a workers' insurrection against the Georgian government.
- Born:
  - Yozo Matsushima, Japanese mathematician who theorized Matsushima's formula; in Sakai City, Osaka Prefecture(d. 1983)
  - Lloyd Bentsen, American politician, served as U.S. Senator for Texas from 1971 to 1993 and U.S. Secretary of the Treasury from 1993 to 1994; in Mission, Texas (d. 2006)
- Died: Sir William Blake Richmond, 78, English portrait painter (b. 1842)

== February 12, 1921 (Saturday) ==
- The Russian-incited rebellion in Georgia spread as anti-Menshevik insurgents seized Borchalo, a district within Georgia's Tbilisi province, the day after the rebellion started in Lori province.
- Winston Churchill was approved by King George V to be the new Secretary of State for the Colonies, transferring from the position of Secretary of State for War to replace Lord Milner. Succeeding Churchill as War Secretary was Laming Worthington-Evans.

== February 13, 1921 (Sunday) ==
- The February Uprising began in Yerevan, capital of Armenia, when the Armenian Revolutionary Federation rebelled against the Bolsheviks who had proclaimed the Armenian Soviet Socialist Republic. By the end of the week, the ARF had driven the Bolsheviks and its Soviet Army supporters from Yerevan and proclaimed the Republic of Mountainous Armenia, led by former Prime Minister Simon Vratsian. The Soviet Army retook Yerevan after seven weeks and suppressed the uprising.
- The British schooner Hawker departed from Greece, bound for Sicily, and was not seen again. It was presumed lost in the Mediterranean Sea.

== February 14, 1921 (Monday) ==
- Vearl J. Manwill and some associates located the Timpanogos Cave in northern Utah near Provo and close to the town of Highland.
- With Bolshevik uprisings having started in the Georgian Republic and a Russian invasion expected, Georgia's Constituent Assembly appointed General Giorgi Kvinitadze as the Georgian Army's Commander-in-Chief in order to defend the nation.
- The comic strip Gasoline Alley written since November 24, 1918, took a new turn with the introduction of "Skeezix" as a baby left on the doorstep of Walt Wallet. From there, the strip became the first in which "the characters in the strip grew old along with the readers" as time went on.
- The U.S. Census Bureau announced that the mean center of the United States population had moved to "the extreme southeast corner of Owen County, Indiana, 8.3 miles southeast of the town of Spencer" after having been "about one-fifth of a mile north from Bloomington, Ind., where it was located by the census of 1910."
- Born:
  - Hugh Downs, American radio and TV broadcaster, television host, talk show sidekick and music composer; in Akron, Ohio (d. 2020)
  - John Henry Waddell, American sculptor; in Des Moines, Iowa (d. 2019)
  - Michael Goaman, British graphics artist and commemorative stamp designer; as Geoffrey Michael Goaman, in East Grinstead, West Sussex (d. 2009)

== February 15, 1921 (Tuesday) ==
- At Shulaveri, in the Georgian Republic, Bolshevik activist Filipp Makharadze organized the Revolutionary Committee of Georgia and made a formal appeal to the Soviet government for Russian support of the anti-Menshevik insurgents. The Soviets responded, ordering the 11th Army of the Soviet Army forces to begin assistance to the Georgian Bolsheviks. Under the command of General Anatoliy Gekker, the 11th Army crossed into Georgia from Armenia and Azerbaijan and proceeded toward the Georgian capital at Tbilisi.
- Eight train passengers were killed, and 10 wounded, after being caught in the crossfire of a gun battle between the Irish Republican Army and the British Army's Essex Regiment. The IRA had attempted an ambush on the train as it stopped at Upton, County Cork.
- The Colombian Air Force became an active service, originally as a branch of the Colombian Army.
- The New Mexico Mounted Police, the law enforcement officers on horseback who had patrolled New Mexico since before it attained statehood in 1912, was abolished, leaving no statewide law enforcement to supplement local authorities. The gap in law enforcement would be remedied in 1933 with the formation of a new agency, the New Mexico Motor Patrol, now the New Mexico State Police.

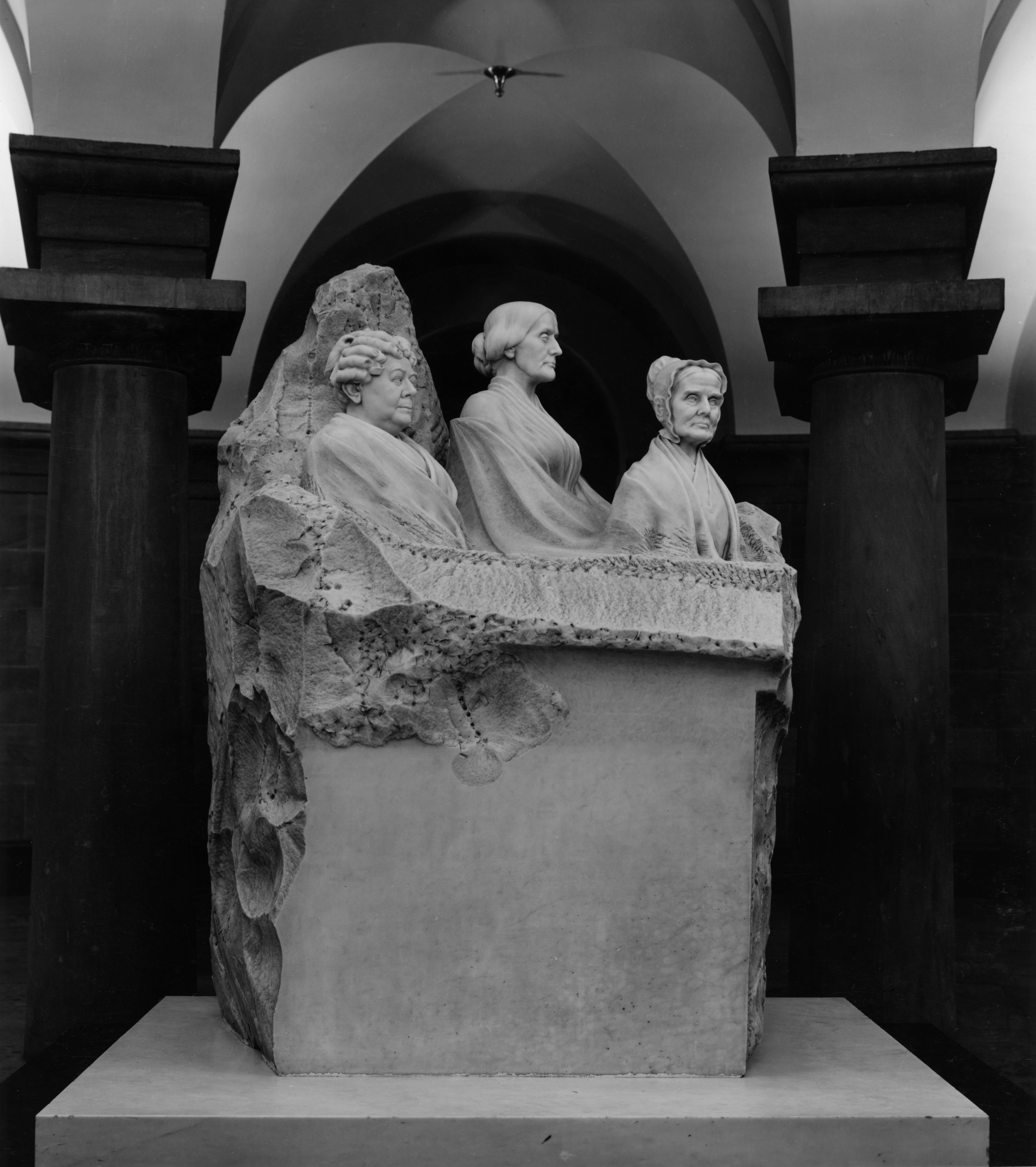
Mott, Anthony and Stanton

- On the occasion of her 101st birthday, a statue of women's suffragist Susan B. Anthony (along with fellow suffragists Lucretia Mott and Elizabeth Cady Stanton) was unveiled in the U.S. Capitol Rotunda in honor of the granting of the right to vote to women. Soon after the dedication, however, the statue was moved to the basement of the Capitol, where it would remain for 75 years before being returned to the Rotunda in 1997.
- As a demonstration that an appendectomy could be performed without using a general anesthetic to put the patient to sleep, Dr. Evan O'Neill Kane used a local anesthetic and performed the surgery on himself before observers from the medical community and the press, cutting an incision, removing his own appendix, applying the sutures and stitching his own incision.

== February 16, 1921 (Wednesday) ==
- A mob of 3,000 people from four counties in Georgia carried out the lynching of John Lee Eberhart in Oconee County, Georgia, burning him at the stake after he was accused of murdering his employer, Ida Lee. Eberhart, who had turned himself in, was forcibly taken from the Clarke County Jail in Athens, Georgia by the mob, which returned him to the scene of the crime and killed him.
- Emigration to the U.S. from the nations of Central Europe was halted because of a typhus epidemic.
- Born:
  - Hua Guofeng, Chinese politician, Chairman of the Chinese Communist Party as successor to Mao Zedong from 1976 to 1981, and Premier of the People's Republic of China as successor to Zhou Enlai from 1976 to 1980; as Su Zhu, in Jiaocheng, Shanxi province, Republic of China(d. 2008)
  - Vera-Ellen, American dancer and film actress; as Vera-Ellen Westmeier Rohe, in Norwood, Ohio (d. 1981)

== February 17, 1921 (Thursday) ==
- The scientific journal Nature devoted its entire issue to the general theory of relativity with articles written in the wake of the Eddington experiment observations made during the solar eclipse of May 29, 1919. In addition to the lead article from Albert Einstein, the historic issue of Nature had articles by physicists J. H. Jeans, H. A. Lorentz, Oliver Lodge, Hermann Weyl, Arthur Eddington, Norman Campbell; astronomers Ebenezer Cunningham, Frank Dyson, A. C. D. Crommelin, Charles E. St. John and Harold Jeffreys; mathematicians G. B. Mathews, Dorothy Wrinch; and philosopher H. Wildon Carr.

== February 18, 1921 (Friday) ==
- Days after the invasion by Soviet troops of the Georgian Republic, Georgia's Prime Minister Noe Zhordania and other Georgian leaders left the capital at Tbilisi and fled to Batumi.
- The United States withdrew from the Allied Reparations Commission, as the Department of State noted that the U.S. had not ratified the Treaty of Versailles.
- In the British Parliament, the recently retired Secretary of State for the Colonies, Lord Milner, presented to Commons and to the House of Lords the results of his committee's fact-finding mission, and his recommendation that self-government be granted to Egypt without undue delay.
- Argentina announced that it would continue to purchase and import war materials from Germany and that it would not recognize the prohibitions of the Treaty of Versailles.
- Born: Brian Faulkner, Irish politician, last Prime Minister of Northern Ireland from 1971 to 1972; as Arthur Brian Deane Faulkner, in Helen's Bay, County Down, Northern Ireland United Kingdom of Great Britain and Ireland (d. 1977)
- Died:
  - Rafael Reyes, 71, President of Colombia from 1904 to 1909 (b. 1849)
  - Hamazasp Srvandztyan, 47–48, Armenian military officer; "brutally hacked to death" in revenge for a massacre of Armenian Bolsheviks (b. 1873)

== February 19, 1921 (Saturday) ==
- France agreed to come in on the side of Poland in the Polish-Soviet War and formed a political alliance after negotiations in Paris between Poland's Minister of Foreign Affairs, Eustachy Sapieha, and France's Foreign Minister, Aristide Briand.
- The daily newspaper Folha de São Paulo, the highest circulation daily in Brazil, published its first issue.
- The Russian daily newspaper Trud, founded by the Soviet Communist Party as the official paper of the All-Union Central Council of Trade Unions, published its first issue.
- By a vote of 62 to 2, the U.S. Senate passed the Dillingham Immigration Bill, providing a limit for the total number of incoming immigrants from a particular nation to no more than 5 percent of the 1910 U.S. population of natives of that nation. President Wilson vetoed the bill as one of his last acts in office, and his term and the term of the 66th U.S. Congress both expired on March 4. The Act would be passed in May by the next session of Congress.
- The small city of Kalâa Kebira, which now has a population of 46,000, was founded in Tunisia.

== February 20, 1921 (Sunday) ==
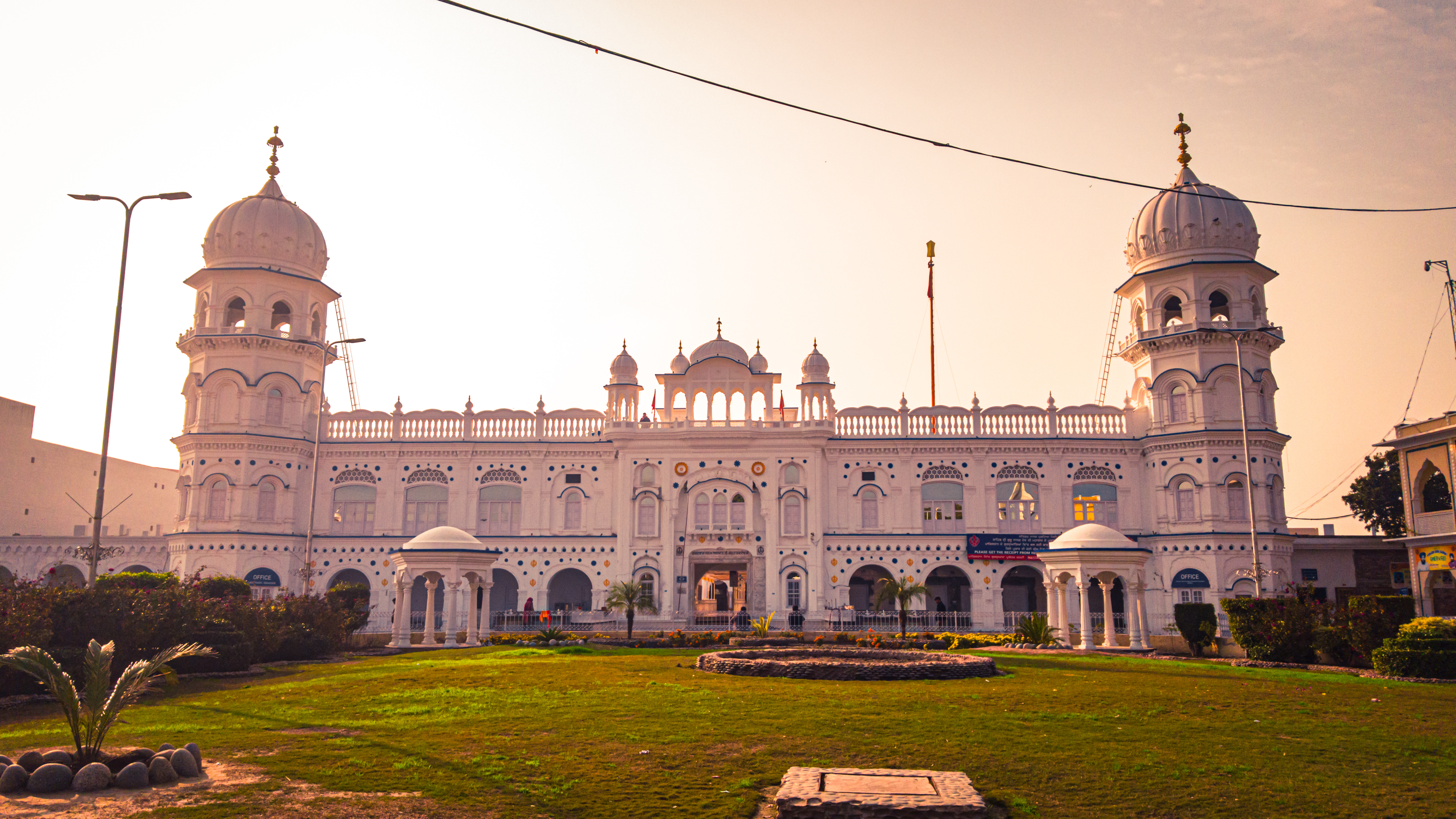
The Gurdwara

- A massacre of 260 Sikh protesters took place at the Gurdwara Janam Asthan in the small city of Nankana Sahib in the western Punjab province in British India, now part of Pakistan.
- Elections for Prussia's representative parliament, the Landtag, preserved the control of the Socialist Party, which had 113 seats, 90 for the Centrists, 73 for the Nationalists, 57 for the People's Party and 88 divided between four other parties.
- The Royal Irish Constabulary and the British Army carried out the Clonmult ambush near Midleton in County Cork, killing 12 Irish Republican Army members after cornering them in a farmhouse. Two Constabulary members were killed, two captured IRA members were later executed, and the IRA subsequently carried out the murders of six suspected informers.
- Born: Buddy Rogers (ring name for Herman Rohde Jr.) American professional wrestler and one of TV's earliest stars; in Camden, New Jersey (d. 1992)

== February 21, 1921 (Monday) ==
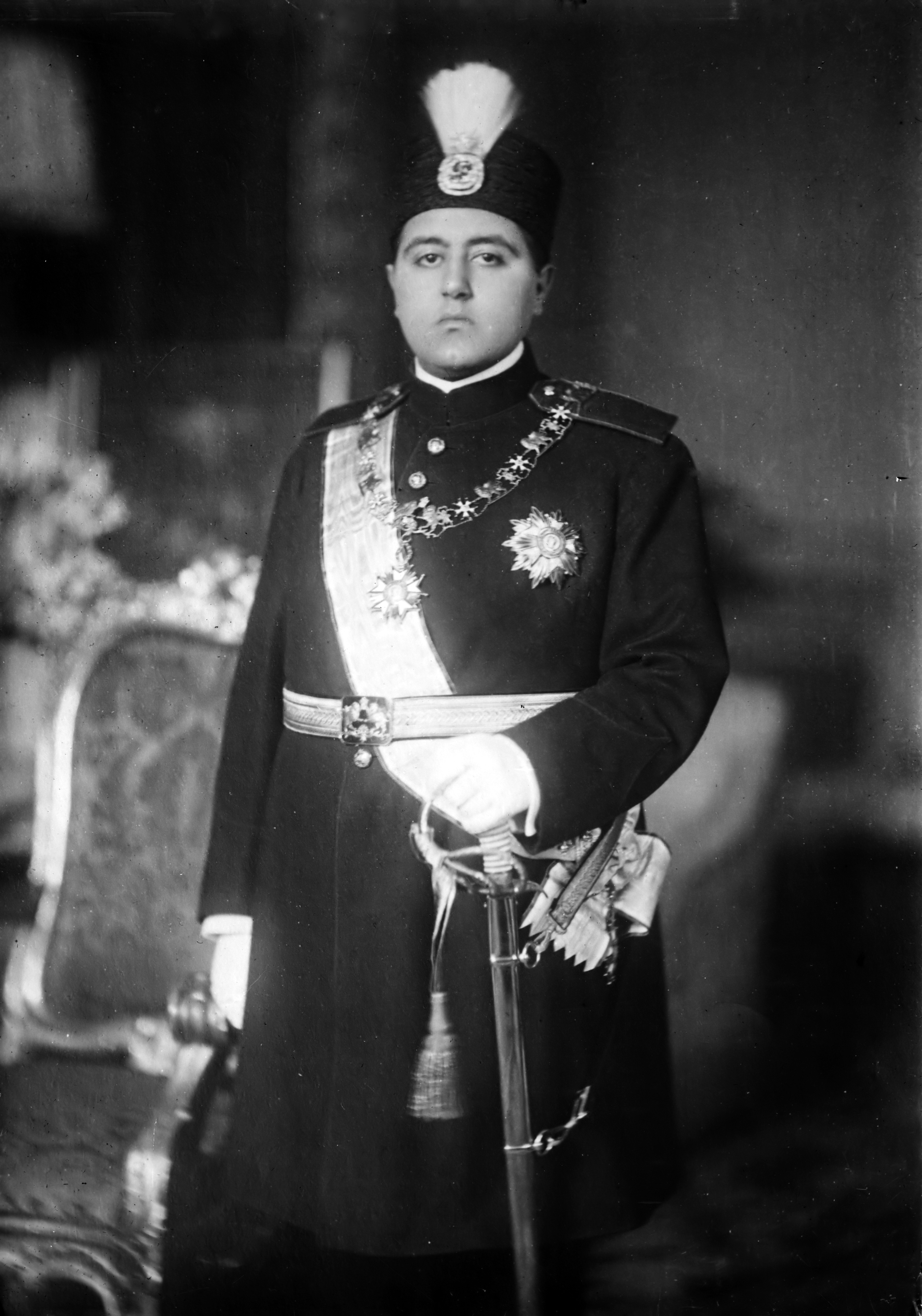
Ahmad Shah Qajar

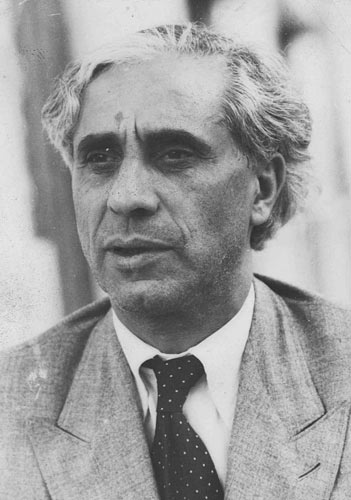
Coup leader Tabatabaee

- Fathollah Khan Akbar, Prime Minister of Iran for the Shah Ahmad Shah Qajar, was overthrown in a coup d'état by Colonel Reza Khan Pahlavi and journalist Zia'eddin Tabatabaee, who originally had the goal of preserving the Qajar dynasty, and Reza Khan signed a treaty with the Soviet Union five days later. Ahmed Shah, with little power, would remain the nominal monarch for two more years before being sent into exile in 1923. In 1925, after Iran had no monarch on the throne, Reza Khan would start the Pahlavi dynasty as the new would last for less than 60 years, with Reza Khan succeeded by his son Mohammad Reza Pahlavi, who would be overthrown in the 1979 Iranian Revolution.
- The Constituent Assembly of Georgia passed a Constitution for the Democratic Republic of Georgia, four days before the Soviet Red Army marched into the capital at Tbilisi during the Red Army invasion of Georgia.
- The first game of a North American ice hockey league for women took place in Vancouver as the Seattle Vamps lost to the Vancouver Amazons, 5 to 0. The only other team in the league was the Victoria (BC) Kewpies.
- Aidan de Brune walked into Sydney, New South Wales, 90 days after his November 24 departure from Fremantle, Western Australia, becoming the first person to walk across Australia by himself, from coast to coast. Mr. de Brune would top his feat seven months later by setting off from Sydney on September 20 to begin a two and a half year walk around the perimeter of Australia, returning to Sydney on March 4, 1924.
- The first ski jump competition in the U.S. was held at Lake Placid, New York, attracting 3,000 spectators and being won by Antony Maurer. The Lake Placid complex became the training location for the U.S. Olympic skiing team to train for the first Winter Olympics, which would be inaugurated in 1924.
- Born:
  - John Rawls, American political philosopher; in Baltimore (d. 2002)
  - Leroy J. Manor, U.S. Air Force Lieutenant General best known for Operation Ivory Coast, an attempt to free American POWs during the Vietnam War; in Morrisonville, New York (d. 2021)

== February 22, 1921 (Tuesday) ==
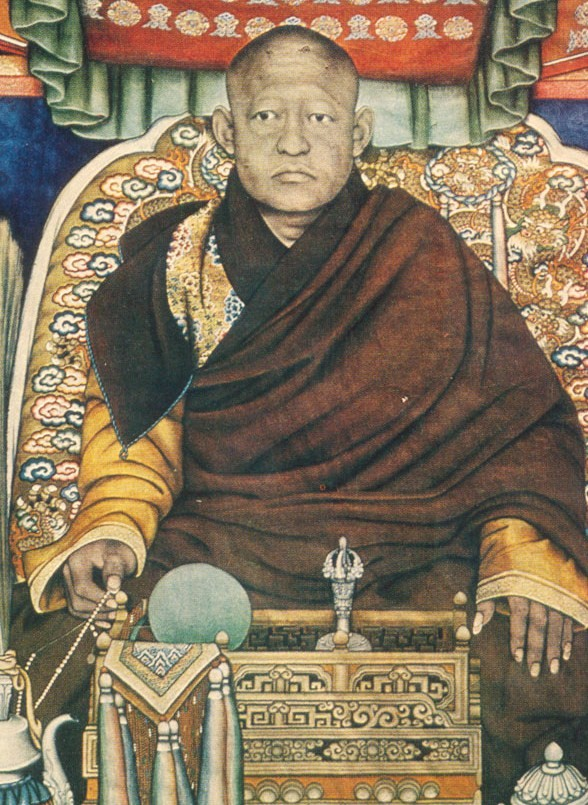
Mongol ruler Bogd Khan

- The Bogd Khan returned to the throne as the ruler of Mongolia after 18 months of Chinese occupation, with the aid of his new Prime Minister Jalkhanz Khutagt Sodnomyn Damdinbazar.
- U.S. President-elect Warren G. Harding announced his cabinet appointees to be confirmed by the U.S. Senate in March, including Herbert C. Hoover as Secretary of Commerce, Charles Evans Hughes as Secretary of State, Andrew W. Mellon as Secretary of the Treasury, Henry C. Wallace as Secretary of Agriculture, Albert B. Fall as Secretary of the Interior and Harry M. Daugherty as Attorney General.
- The horrific collision of two electric streetcars near Shelton, Connecticut, caused a fire to sweep through both cars, burning eight passengers to death and hospitalizing 20 others. According to witnesses, one of the passengers on the southbound trolley to Bridgeport had been carrying a can of gasoline which ruptured and ignited on impact after one of the cars missed a signal, putting it on the same track as the northbound trolley from Bridgeport.
- Born:
  - Jean-Bédel Bokassa, Central African Republic military officer who became the nation's President (1966 to 1976) and then proclaimed himself Emperor Bokassa I until his overthrow in 1979; in Bobangui, Ubangi-Shari, French Equatorial Africa (now the Central African Republic) (d. 1996)
  - Marshall Teague, American race car racer who competed in NASCAR and the USAC; in Daytona Beach, Florida (killed in racing accident, 1959)
  - Giulietta Masina, Italian film actress; in San Giorgio di Piano (d. 1994)
- Died:
  - Henry Starr, 47, American bank robber and of the first to use a "getaway car" in driving from town to town, died four days after being fatally wounded by the president of the People's National Bank in Harrison, Arkansas
  - Ernst Gunther, Duke of Schleswig-Holstein, 57, the last person to hold the official title until the abolition of the German monarchy in 1918
  - Montague Yeats-Brown, 86, British diplomat in Genoa and Boston

== February 23, 1921 (Wednesday) ==
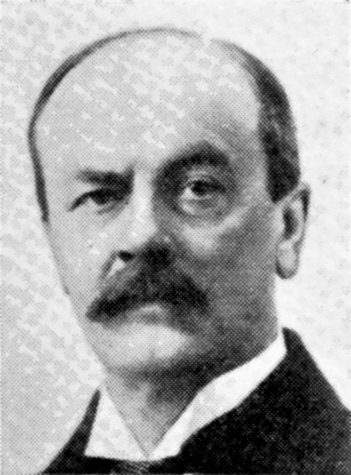
De Geer

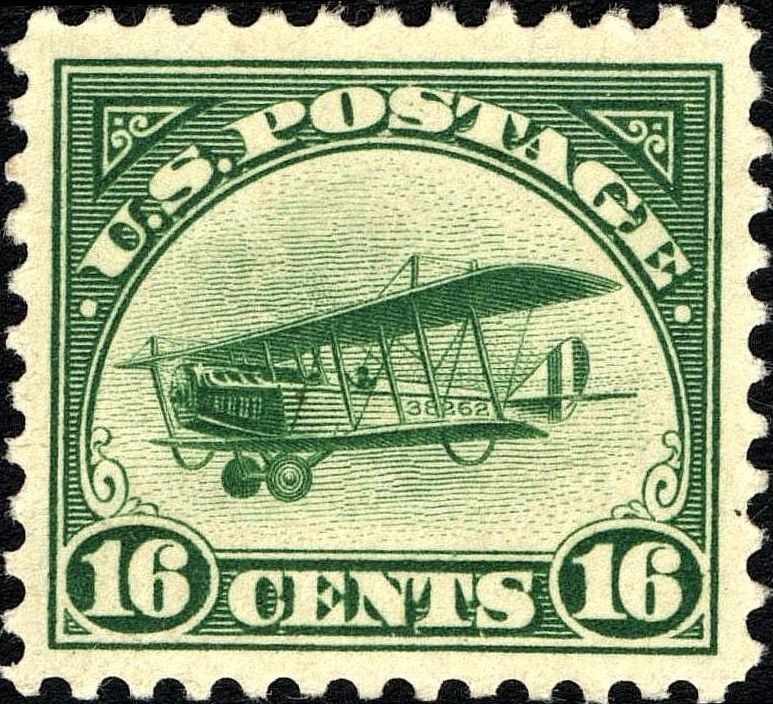
U.S. Air Mail stamp

- The moderately conservative public official Oscar von Sydow became the new Prime Minister of Sweden, succeeding Baron Louis De Geer.
- The U.S. Post Office set a new record for air mail delivery, conveying mail posted the day before at San Francisco to delivery in New York City, in 33 hours and 20 minutes, becoming the first person to fly through the night rather than waiting for daylight. Pilot Jack Knight departed the morning before at 4:30 Pacific time (7:30 Eastern) from San Francisco and landed at Cheyenne, Wyoming in daylight, then took off at dusk and flew all night in darkness to Chicago, 839 miles (1,350 km) away, before another pilot, Ernest M. Allison, continued on the rest of the way to a landing at 4:50 in the afternoon Eastern time at an airfield at Roosevelt Field on Long Island across from New York City. The Post Office said in a press release that the night time flight was "the momentous step in civil aviation" and pledged to inaugurate regular nighttime flights. The demonstration flight showed that air mail delivery could be feasible, since previous flights had been limited to daylight hours with long layovers through the night. On July 1, 1924, the Post Office would make any-hour flying a regular policy, cutting the time for a transcontinental trip (between New York and San Francisco) from 72 hours to 33 hours. The actual time in the air for the 2,666 miles (4,291 km) transcontinental trip was 25 hours and 53 minutes. Knight was one of four pilots making simultaneous transcontinental flights. The two westbound flights from New York were grounded by bad weather after reaching Chicago, and the other eastbound flight, piloted by U.S. Army Captain W. F. Lewis, crashed at Elko, Nevada.
- Died:
  - Major General Alexander Mackenzie, 76, American engineer
  - Henry C. Stanley, 80, Scottish-born Australian engineer
  - Otto Piper, 79, German architectural historian

== February 24, 1921 (Thursday) ==
- General Giorgi Kvinitadze and the Georgian Army retreated from Tbilisi as the Soviet 11th Army and 9th Army approached, in order to defend the seat of government at Batumi.
- U.S. Army 1st Lt. William D. Coney of the 91st Aero Squadron completed a transcontinental flight of 22.5 hours flying time from San Diego to Jacksonville (Coronado, California, to Pablo Beach, Florida), in a DeHavilland DH-4.
- Born: Abe Vigoda, American film and TV actor, best known as "Detective Fish" in the sitcom Barney Miller; in New York City (d. 2016)

== February 25, 1921 (Friday) ==
- Less than two weeks after invading the Democratic Republic of Georgia, the Soviet Union's Red Army captured the Georgian capital Tiflis (now Tbilisi) and installed a Communist government led by Filipp Makharadze, which would soon vote to be annexed as the Georgian Soviet Socialist Republic into the USSR. The rest of the country was overrun within three weeks, but it was not until September 1924 that Soviet rule was firmly established. Since 2010, February 25 has been a day of remembrance and a holiday, recognized as Soviet Occupation Day to remind citizens of the 70 years that Georgia was under control of the Communists.
- Congressman Patrick McLane (D-Pennsylvania) was removed from his seat by a 161 to 121 vote of his colleagues in the U.S. House of Representatives, on charges that he had committed election fraud in the November voting and had violated the Corrupt Practices Act. The House then voted to accept the report of the House Committee of Elections and its recommendations, and declared that McLane's opponent, John R. Farr, had won the election and should be entitled to take office on March 4.
- The Southern Conference was formed by 14 major U.S. universities that had departed the Southern Intercollegiate Athletic Association. At its height, it would have 23 member institutions, before 13 departed in 1933 to form the Southeastern Conference (SEC), and in 1953, seven more would leave to form the Atlantic Coast Conference.
- Born: Pierre Laporte, Canadian politician who was Deputy Premier of Quebec when he was kidnapped and murdered in 1970; in Montreal (d. 1970)
- Died: Orland P. Bassett, 89, American florist credited with popularizing the American Beauty rose

== February 26, 1921 (Saturday) ==
- The President of Panama, Belisario Porras Barahona, signed a proclamation of war against neighboring Costa Rica for its invasion of the Panamanian territory, and issued an emergency decree suspending constitutional rights temporarily and calling on all Panamanian males between the ages of 18 and 40 to register for military service. Porras withheld presenting the proclamation of war until March 1, when he planned to present it to the National Assembly.
- The Russo-Persian Treaty of Friendship was signed in Moscow.
- Sixteen sailors on the new U.S. Navy destroyer USS Woolsey were killed after the ship was rammed by a merchant ship, the Steel Inventor off of the coast of Panama. There were 112 survivors who were rescued after the collision, 13 miles (21 km) southwest of the Panamanian island of Coiba. The Steel Inventor, with thick plating suffered only minor damage.
- The famous religious poem "The Touch of the Master's Hand", written by Myra Brooks Welch, was first published, as a feature in the magazine Gospel Messenger.
- Born:
  - Betty Hutton (stage name for Elizabeth Thornburg); American singer and actress on stage, film and TV, best known for starring as Annie Oakley in the musical Annie Get Your Gun; in Battle Creek, Michigan (d. 2007)
  - Wolf-Udo Ettel, German Luftwaffe ace credited with 124 shootdowns of Allied aircraft; in Hamburg (killed in dogfight, 1943)
  - Wilma Scott Heide, American feminist and social activist who successfully pursued a lawsuit that ended the practice in newspapers of separate help wanted ads for men and women; in Johnstown, Pennsylvania (d. 1985).
- Died: Carl Menger, 81, Austrian economic theorist and founder of the Austrian School and the first to describe the concept of marginal utility

== February 27, 1921 (Sunday) ==
- The International Working Union of Socialist Parties (IWUSP) was formed in Vienna.
- At least 28 passengers were killed, and 100 injured at Porter, Indiana, when the Michigan Central Railroad's Canadian Flier disregarded a right of way warning and was struck by the New York Central Railroad's Boston-Chicago Express. The fireman and the engineer of the New York Central were killed when they were scalded by a ruptured boiler.
- Born:
  - Eka Tjipta Widjaja, Chinese-born Indonesian businessman who founded Sinermas, which grew to one of the largest conglomerate corporations in Indonesia; as Oei Ek-Tjhong in Quanzhou, Fujian province (d. 2019)
  - Michael Fox (Myron Melvin Fox), American character actor on stage and TV; in Yonkers, New York (d. 1996)
- Died: Schofield Haigh, 49, English cricketer with 113 appearances for the English national team between 1899 and 1912, died following a stroke.

== February 28, 1921 (Monday) ==
- The Kronstadt rebellion was initiated by sailors of the Soviet Navy's Baltic Fleet with the presentation by Stephen Petrichenko, chief clerk of the battleship Petropavlovsk, of 15 demands by the men of that ship and the Sevastopol, to the Kronstadt Communist Party Council.
- The Cleveland Clinic, now one of the most famous hospitals in the United States, admitted its first patients, with 42 persons being checked in.
- An attempt by Costa Rica to invade Panama was halted by the Panamanian Army at the border town of Coto, and U.S. troops moved into Panama City to protect that nation's government.
- At the Irish city of Cork, six IRA members were executed by order of court martial for levying war on British forces. In reprisal, five British soldiers in Cork were killed by the IRA.
- Aircraft Transport and Travel, founded in 1916 and one of the first airlines in Britain, ceased operations along with two others, after the French government began subsidizing its three airlines licensed to carry passengers.
- French troops, including Algerian, Moroccan and Senegalese soldiers recruited from French-controlled portions of Africa, were sent to the border with Germany in preparation of an invasion and occupation of Germany's Ruhr area to enforce reparations.
- Born:
  - Pierre Clostermann, French fighter pilot who shot down 33 German planes in dogfights during World War II; in Curitiba, Brazil to a French diplomat (d. 2006)
  - James L. Baldwin, U.S. Army Major General and the last general to be removed from command for combat errors; in Omaha, Nebraska (d. 1979)
  - Saul Zaentz, American film producer, in Passiac, New Jersey, (d. 2014)
