= Kenjiro Shoda =

Japanese mathematician

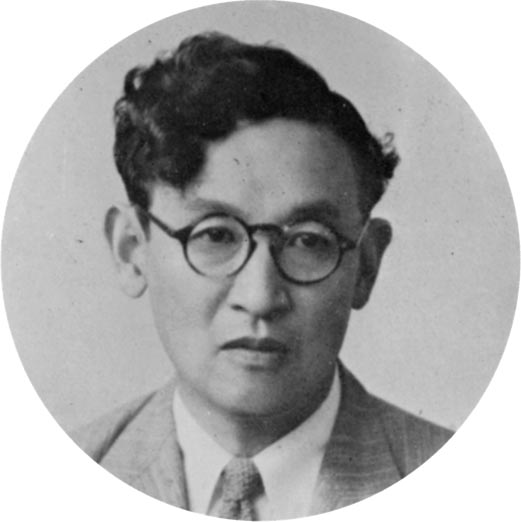
- Born: February 25, 1902; Tatebayashi, Gunma, Japan
- Died: March 20, 1977 (aged 75); Ashikaga, Tochigi, Japan
- Education: Tokyo Imperial University
- Spouses: Tami Hirayama; Sadako Ito
- Scientific career
- Fields: Mathematics
- Workplaces: Osaka University; Musashi University
- Thesis: Über direkt zerlegbare Gruppen (1931)
- Doctoral advisor: Teiji Takagi
- Doctoral students: Masatoshi Gündüz Ikeda; Yozo Matsushima

Kenjiro Shoda (Japanese: 正田 建次郎 Shōda Kenjirō; February 25, 1902 – March 20, 1977) was a Japanese mathematician.

== Early life and career ==
Kenjiro Shoda was born on February 25, 1902, in Tatebayashi, Gunma to a wealthy family. He was the second son of Teiichiro Shoda, who was the founder of Nisshin Seifun Group, one of the biggest companies in Japan, a member of the House of Peers, and a great-grandfather of the Emperor. He was educated in Tokyo until he finished junior high school. He went to the National Eighth High School in Nagoya, today succeeded to Faculty of Liberal Arts of Nagoya University.

After Shoda finished the Eighth High School, he returned to Tokyo and studied mathematics at Imperial University of Tokyo. Shoda was supervised by Teiji Takagi, one of the best mathematicians in Japan at that time, and Takagi inspired Shoda to study algebra. Shoda graduated at Department of Mathematics, Faculty of Science at Tokyo University in 1925 and continued his graduate study under Takagi's supervision.

In 1925, in his second year at the Graduate School of Tokyo University, Shoda got a scholarship which allowed him to study in Germany. With an interest in group theory, he went to Berlin to work with Issai Schur. After one year in Berlin, Shoda went to Göttingen to study with Emmy Noether. Noether's school brought a mathematical growth to him. In 1929 he returned to Japan. Soon afterwards, he began to write Abstract Algebra, his mathematical textbook in Japanese for advanced learners. It was published in 1932 and soon recognised as a significant work for mathematics in Japan. It became a standard textbook and was reprinted many times. In 1931 he defended his thesis, titled "Über direkt zerlegbare Gruppen".

== Osaka University ==
In 1933, Shoda was appointed as professor in the Faculty of Science at Imperial Osaka University, which was founded in 1931, as the eighth Imperial University of Japan and hence the second one in the Kansai region, to promote industries in Osaka, therefore focusing on natural science, engineering and medicine in particular.

The decades from the 1930s were a hard time for Japanese researchers. However, Shoda continued to apply himself to learning. After World War II, he was elected the first Chairman of the Mathematical Society of Japan in 1946, when the predecessor was divided into the Mathematical Society of Japan and the Physical Society of Japan. In this role he managed to reconstruct Japanese mathematics both theoretically and organisationally. Also, he was eager to attempt to keep the educational standard at Osaka University as its faculty staff. In this period, he published General Algebra, another textbook in Japanese. In 1949 Shoda was awarded the Japan Academy Prize in recognition of his fine achievements. Also that year he was elected the Dean of the Faculty of Science at Osaka University.

In 1955, Shoda was appointed as President of Osaka University, a role in which he remained for six years. His achievements as president include foundations of two new faculties: the Faculty of Letters and the Faculty of Engineering Science, both based at Toyonaka, Osaka. The Faculty of Engineering Science was an ambitious attempt to synthesise two traditional disciplines: science and engineering. Some criticise the Faculty of Engineering Science as being nothing less than a duplicate of the Faculty of Engineering, while others recognise it as having helped to promote academic collaboration between multiple disciplines, including science, engineering and sometimes medical science.

Shoda is remembered by the students and alumni of Osaka University as the founder of the Shoda Cup, which is given for the winning team of five people in an athletics contest. Shoda worried that most students were lacking in physical education and paid too little attention to it. With this Cup, he attempted to invoke interest for sporting activities among students. It succeeded and the Shoda Cup has been contested yearly by many students.

When his term as president ended in 1961, Shoda left Osaka University but suddenly returned as a professor in the Faculty of Engineering Science founded that year, and was appointed its first dean. After retirement from Osaka University, he still worked to improve the Japanese educational system in this field. He taught in Musashi University in Tokyo and became its president. In 1969, he was awarded the Order of Culture, and awarded the Grand Cordon of the Order of the Sacred Treasure in 1974.

On March 20, 1977, Shoda died unexpectedly while driving with his family. He was posthumously raised to the second degree in the official order of precedence, and awarded the Grand Cordon of the Order of the Rising Sun.

== Marriage and family ==
Kenjiro Shoda married twice. His first wife was Tami Hirayama, the daughter of astronomer Shin Hirayama. He fathered one son and two daughters during this marriage. After the death of his first wife, Shoda married Sadako Ito, daughter of Eisaburo Ito, an engineering scientist and professor at Kyushu University. The remarried couple had one son.

After his death, his family contributed a part of his legacy to some academic institutions including Osaka University. Osaka University used the money to make a small garden near to two of his former workplaces: the Faculty of Science and the Faculty of Engineering Science and named it after him. "Shoda Garden", a silent cozy space, is at the corner of main street of the campus, beside the building of the Cyber Media Center at Toyonaka, backed by dense bamboo woods. Sometimes people at Toyonaka hold their parties there, like a welcoming party for freshmen, or a barbecue just for fun and communication.

Empress Michiko is one of his nieces.
