= Yozo Matsushima =

Japanese mathematician

- Born: February 11, 1921; Sakai City, Osaka Prefecture, Japan
- Died: April 9, 1983 (aged 62); Osaka, Japan
- Education: Osaka University
- Known for: research in Lie algebras and Lie groups
- Awards: Asahi Prize
- Scientific career
- Fields: Mathematics
- Workplaces: Osaka University; Nagoya University; University of Notre Dame
- Doctoral advisor: Kenjiro Shoda

Yozo Matsushima (松島 与三, Matsushima Yozō; February 11, 1921 – April 9, 1983) was a Japanese mathematician, who made important contributions to Differential Geometry and the theory of Lie Groups.

== Early life ==
Matsushima was born on February 11, 1921, in Sakai City, Osaka Prefecture, Japan. He studied at Osaka Imperial University (later named Osaka University) and graduated with a Bachelor of Science degree in mathematics in September 1942. At Osaka, he was taught by mathematicians Kenjiro Shoda. After completing his degree, he was appointed as an assistant in the Mathematical Institute of Nagoya Imperial University (later named Nagoya University). These were difficult years for Japanese students and researchers because of World War II.

The first paper published by Matsushima contained a proof that a conjecture of Hans Zassenhaus was false. Zassenhaus had conjectured that every semisimple Lie algebra L over a field of prime characteristic, with [L, L] = L, is the direct sum of simple ideals. Matsushima constructed a counterexample. He then developed a proof that Cartan subalgebras of a complex Lie algebra are conjugate. However, Japanese researchers were out of touch with the research done in the West, and Matsushima was unaware that French mathematician Claude Chevalley had already published a proof. When he obtained details of another paper of Chevalley through a review in Mathematical Reviews, he was able to construct the proofs for himself.

Matsushima published two papers in the 1947 volume of the Proceedings of the Japan Academy (which did not appear until 1950) and three papers in the first volume of Journal of the Mathematical Society of Japan.

== Professorship ==
Matsushima became a full professor at Nagoya University in 1953. Chevalley visited Matsushima in Nagoya in 1953 and invited him to spend the following year in France. He went to France in 1954 and returned to Nagoya in December 1955. He also spent time at the University of Strasbourg. He presented some of his results to Ehresmann's seminar in Strasbourg, extending Cartan's classification of complex irreducible Lie algebras to the case of real Lie algebras.

During this period, Matsushima discovered the first known obstruction to the existence of Kähler-Einstein metrics on Fano manifolds (that is, compact complex manifolds with $c_1 > 0$). This breakthrough theorem, which indicated that certain conjectures of Calabi had been overly optimistic, was then generalized by André Lichnerowicz to give an obstruction to the existence of Kähler metrics of constant scalar curvature. Matsushima's theorem on complex automorphism groups made such an impact on cutting-edge areas of complex differential geometry that it currently remains, by far, his most-cited work.

In spring 1960, Matsushima became a professor of Osaka University as successor to the chair of Shoda. His research took a somewhat different direction and he wrote a series of papers on cohomology of locally symmetric spaces, collaborating with Murakami. He went to the Institute for Advanced Study in September 1962 and returned to Osaka after one year. He jointly began to organize the United States-Japan Seminar in Differential Geometry, which was held in Kyoto in June 1965. After this, he went to France and spent the academic year 1965-66 as visiting professor at the University of Grenoble. He accepted a chair at the University of Notre Dame in Notre Dame, Indiana, in September 1966. He continued to collaborate with Murakami. He introduced Matsushima's formula for the Betti numbers of quotients of symmetric spaces. In 1967, he became an editor of the Journal of Differential Geometry and remained on the editorial board for the rest of his life. After 14 years at Notre Dame, he returned to Japan in 1980. A conference was organized in his honor in May 1980 before he left Notre Dame.

== Later life ==
In February 1981, a volume of papers Manifolds and Lie groups, Papers in honour of Yozo Matsushima was published by his colleagues and former students at Osaka. It also contained some papers presented to the conference held in Notre Dame in the previous May. He died on April 9, 1983, in Osaka, Japan.

== Honours ==
Matsushima received the Asahi Prize for his research on continuous groups in 1962.
