= René Marill Albérès =

French writer and literary critic

René Marill Albérès, or R. M. Albérès, was the pseudonym of René Marill (10 March 1921 – 25 May 1982), a French writer and literary critic. He published book-length studies of Antoine de Saint-Exupéry, André Gide, Gérard de Nerval, Jean Giraudoux, Jean-Paul Sartre, Michel Butor, Franz Kafka, as well as surveys of the novel in twentieth-century European literature.

== Life ==
René Marill Albérès was born on 10 March 1921 in Perpignan. He studied at the École normale supérieure and the Faculty of Letters in Paris. From 1946 to 1954 he taught at the Institut Français in Buenos Aires. From 1954 to 1962 he taught at the Institut français de Florence. From 1962 to 1969 he taught at the University of Fribourg, and from 1969 for the University of Orléans.

In parallel with his academic career, Albérès was a journalist. He wrote for Figaro from 1950 to 1956, for the weekly Arts from 1956 to 1960, and for Les Nouvelles littéraires, where he had a column. His review of Georges Perec's novel La Disparition notoriously failed to notice the absence of the letter e in the novel:

La Disparition is a raw, violent, and facile fiction. [...] The mystery remains entire, but the novel is finished; that is the contemporary form of "literary" detective fiction (as in Robbe-Grillet, though in a different style). Perec carries it off perfectly, in a book that is captivating and dramatic, but that gives off a strong shiff of artifice.

He was a Chevalier of the Legion of Honour. He died on 25 May 1982 in Orléans.

== Works ==
- Saint-Exupery, Paris: La Nouvelle Edition, 1946 (Bibliothèque de l'aviation)
- L'odyssée d'André Gide [The odyssey of André Gide], Paris: La Nouvelle Edition, 1951
- Jean-Paul Sartre, Paris: Éditions universitaires, 1953 (Classiques du XXe Siècle). English translation: Jean-Paul Sartre: Philosopher Without Faith, London: Merlin Press, 1960 (translated by Wade Baskin).
- Gérard de Nerval, Paris: Éditions universitaires, 1955 (Classiques du XIXe Siècle)
- Bilan littéraire du XXe siècle [Literary review of the twentieth century], Paris: Aubier Editions Montaigne, 1956 (Les essais chez Montaigne)
- Esthétique et morale chez Jean Giraudoux [Aesthetics and morals in Jean Giraudoux], Paris: Librairie Nizet, 1957
- L'aventure intellectuelle du XXe siècle: panorama des littératures européennes, 1900–1959 [The intellectual adventure of the twentieth century: a panorama of European literature], Paris: ALbin Michel, 1959
- "Neo-Marxism and Criticism of Dialectical Reasoning" in: Edith Kern, ed., Sartre: A Collection of Critical Essays, Englewood Cliffs, NJ: Prentice-Hall, Inc., 1962 (Twentieth Century Views Series)
- Histoire du roman moderne, [History of the modern novel], Paris: Albin Michel, 1962
- Michel Butor, Paris: Editions universitaires, 1964 (Classiques du XXe Siècle)
- Métamorphoses du roman [Metamorphoses of the novel], Paris: Albin Michel, 1966
- (with Pierre de Boisdeffre) Kafka: The Torment of Man, New York: Philosophical Library, 1967. Translated by Wade Baskin.
