= Matsushima's formula =

In mathematics, Matsushima's formula, introduced by Matsushima (1967), is a formula for the Betti numbers of a quotient of a symmetric space G/H by a discrete group, in terms of unitary representations of the group G. The Matsushima–Murakami formula is a generalization giving dimensions of spaces of automorphic forms, introduced by Matsushima & Murakami (1968).
