= Edgar Z. Friedenberg =

American scholar of education and gender studies (1921 – 2000)

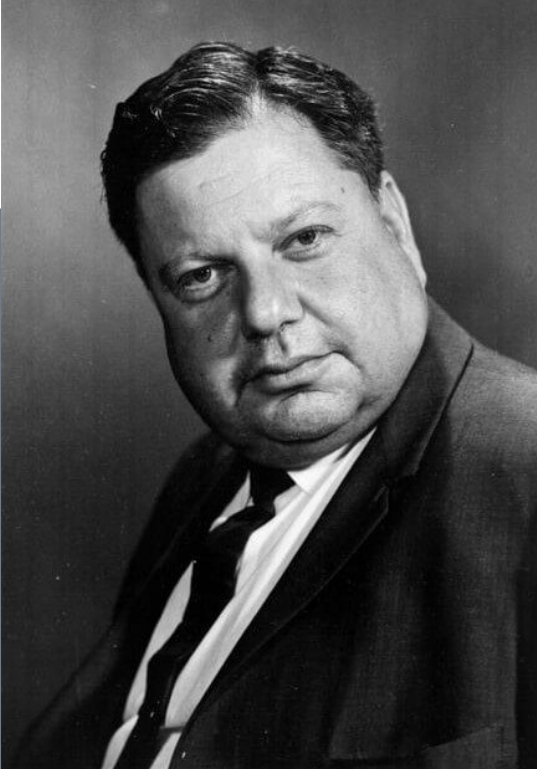
- Friedenberg in 1965
- Born: March 18, 1921; New York City, U.S.
- Died: June 1, 2000 (aged 79); Halifax, Nova Scotia, Canada
- Occupation: Professor
- Known for: The Vanishing Adolescent, Coming of Age in America

Edgar Zodiag Friedenberg (March 18, 1921 – June 1, 2000) was an American scholar of education best known for The Vanishing Adolescent (1959) and Coming of Age in America (1965). The latter was a finalist for the 1966 National Book Award for Nonfiction.

== Early life ==
Edgar Friedenberg was born in New York City on March 18, 1921, and was raised in Shreveport, Louisiana. He studied chemistry at the small, local Centenary College of Louisiana and earned a master's degree in the subject from Stanford University. World War II paused his studies, as Friedenberg served in the Navy and returned to finish his doctorate in education at the University of Chicago in 1946. He became a scholar of education.

== Career ==
From the 1940s into the 60s, Friedenberg taught in Brooklyn College, the University of California, Davis, and the State University of New York, Buffalo. He wrote for Commentary during the tenure of Norman Podhoretz and reviewed books for The New York Review of Books and Ramparts.

His 1959 The Vanishing Adolescent was reprinted ten times and translated into multiple languages. His Coming of Age in America was a finalist for the 1966 National Book Award for Nonfiction. He has been included among the "radical romantics" sociologists of education in the 1960s counterculture.

Friedenberg left the United States for Canada in 1970 to protest the Vietnam War, where he became active in the Canadian Civil Liberties Association and taught at Dalhousie University for the rest of his life. He died June 1, 2000, in Halifax, Nova Scotia.

== Selected bibliography ==
- 1959: The Vanishing Adolescent
- 1965: Coming of Age in America
- 1965: The Dignity of Youth and Other Atavisms
- 1973: R. D. Laing
- 1975: The Disposal of Liberty and Other Industrial Wastes
- 1978: "Education for Passivity in Branch-Plant Society"
- 1980: Deference to Authority: The Case of Canada
