= The Vanishing Adolescent =

1959 book by Edgar Z. Friedenberg

- Author: Edgar Z. Friedenberg
- Subject: Sociology of childhood
- Published: 1959 (Beacon Press)
- Media type: Print
- Pages: 144
- OCLC: 232151
- LC Class: HQ796 F75

The Vanishing Adolescent is a 1959 book-length essay by Edgar Z. Friedenberg that describes changes in American youth's sociological experience of adolescence. The volume was reprinted ten times and translated into multiple languages.
