= Asharam Dalichand Shah =

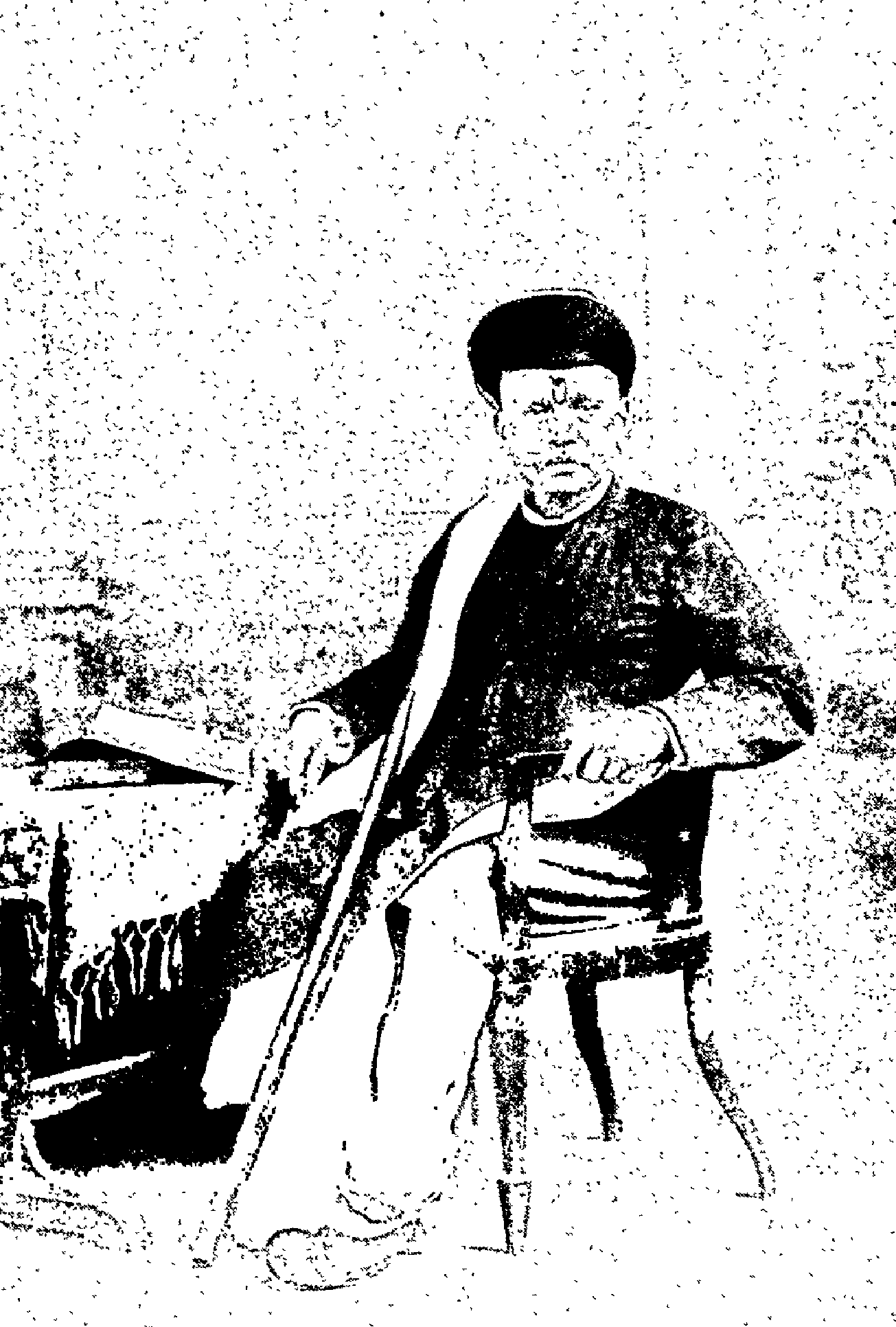
- Born: 8 February 1842; Rajkot, Gujarat, India
- Died: 26 March 1921 (aged 79)
- Occupations: Princely State Administrator (Karbhari/Manager), Educator, Litterateur
- Spouse: Manchhaba (second wife)
- Children: Lallubhai Asharam Shah, Mulchand Asharam Shah
- Relatives: Dalichand Shah (father), Vakhatba (mother)
- Writing career
- Language: Gujarati
- Notable work: Gujarati Kahevat Sangraha (1911)

Signature
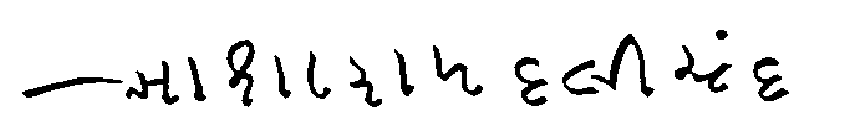

Asharam Dalichand Shah (8 February 1842 ― 26 March 1921) was a prominent administrator, educator, and litterateur in the Kathiawar Agency of British India during the late 19th and early 20th centuries. Belonging to a transitional generation that bridged traditional Indian governance with British administrative systems, Shah served as a high-ranking official in several princely states, including Morvi, Jamnagar, Lathi, and Maliya. He is historically noted for his role in suppressing outlawry (bahirvatu) in the region and for pioneering research in Gujarati language, culminating in his compilation of the Gujarati Kahevat Sangrah, a monumental collection of Gujarati proverbs.

== Ancestry and Background ==
Asharam was born into a Shrimali Bania family with a history of commerce and government service. His grandfather, Nanchand Shah, and his father, Dalichand Shah, were originally from Ahmedabad. Following the devastating famine of 1812–13, Nanchand, 51, Dalichand, 19, and the rest of the family migrated to Kathiawar to seek new opportunities. In the early 19th century, Nanchand Shah secured contracts to supply grain and fodder to the British Army and the Commissariat during military campaigns in the region, specifically working with Parsi contractors named Kamaji and Dadabhai. When the British established a permanent political agency in Rajkot around 1820, the family settled in the Rajkot Civil Camp, becoming one of the earliest settlers in the new colonial administrative hub.

The family originally followed Jainism. However, in 1828, Swaminarayan, the founder of the Swaminarayan Sampraday, visited Rajkot to meet the Governor of Bombay, Sir John Malcolm. Nanchand and Dalichand attended this meeting and were deeply influenced by Swaminarayan's teachings and the devout conduct of his paramhansas (monks). Consequently, the family converted to the Swaminarayan faith, which remained their family religion thereafter.

== Early life and education ==
Asharam was born on 8 February 1842 (Maha Shivaratri, Samvat 1898) in Rajkot. His mother, Vakhatba, had previously lost several male children in infancy. To ward off bad luck for Asharam, she performed various traditional practices common to the era, including piercing the infant's nose to adorn it with a ring (usually worn by females) and symbolically "selling" the child to a neighbor named Kashi for a winnowing fan full of salt.

=== Education ===
Asharam's education began in an era when formal schooling was in its infancy in Kathiawar. He first attended a mission school run by Christian missionaries in Rajkot Camp, where his first teacher was Nandram Mehtaji. Later, the government established a Gujarati school, where he was taught by Tryambaknath and Ganpatram.

Following the Wood's Despatch of 1854, English education began to spread in the Bombay Presidency. Asharam was among the first cohort of students to join the newly established English school in Rajkot. He was a bright student and, in 1859, participated in the first-ever University Entrance (Matriculation) examination held in the province. The examination was conducted under the supervision of Political Agent Colonel J.T. Barr. Although Asharam passed the examination, the conservative social customs of the time and the lack of railway connectivity prevented his parents from sending him to Mumbai for college education at Elphinstone College.

== Career ==
Asharam Shah's career spanned over four decades, during which he transitioned from an educator to a high-ranking administrator in various princely states.

=== Educational Service (1859–1865) ===
Unable to pursue higher studies, Asharam joined the Agency's Education Department. In July 1859, at the age of 17, he was appointed as a teacher in Limbdi. At Limbdi, he gained the confidence of the administration and was appointed as the tutor to the minor heir apparent, Jaswantsinhji, who later became the Thakur Sahib of Limbdi.

In July 1863, he was transferred to Jamnagar (Nawanagar State) as a teacher. Jamnagar was a larger city with a growing demand for English education. Asharam started private English classes for young adults from the mercantile and administrative communities, which became highly popular. His success attracted the attention of the ruler, Jam Vibhaji II, and his Diwan, Sheth Bhagwanji, who eventually offered him a distinct role in the state administration.

=== Administrative Service in Jamnagar ===
In 1865, Asharam resigned from the Education Department to join the Jamnagar state service. He was appointed to assist Vinayakrao Bhagvat, a state official, in a high-stakes boundary dispute regarding the "Atmaram" villages against a neighboring state. The case was being arbitrated by Narayan Vasudev Kharkar. Asharam's knowledge of local geography and records contributed significantly to Jamnagar winning the dispute.

However, his time in Jamnagar was cut short by court intrigues. The Diwan, Sheth Bhagwanji, grew suspicious of the "newly educated" officials (Asharam and Bhagvat) and feared they might undermine his influence with the Jam Sahib. Additionally, the Diwan was involved in a succession intrigue regarding Kalubha, an illegitimate son of the ruler, which Asharam and his group did not support. Consequently, Asharam and Bhagvat were dismissed from Jamnagar service in late 1865.

=== Legal Practice and Return to Service ===
Returning to Rajkot, Asharam obtained a Sanad (license) to practice as a pleader (lawyer) in the Agency courts, which had recently been established by Colonel R. H. Keating. He practiced law for a short period in 1866–67. However, the financial instability of the legal profession at the time, combined with family debts, led him to accept a stable employment offer from the Morvi State.

=== Service in Morvi State ===
Asharam's tenure in Morvi was one of the most significant phases of his career. He was initially appointed as a tutor to the young heir, Waghji II, by Thakur Sahib Rawaji. His role quickly expanded to that of a private secretary, advisor, and a member of the legal council.

==== The Jortalbi Dispute ====
Asharam played a pivotal role in the "Jortalbi" dispute between Morvi and Junagadh State. Junagadh claimed a tribute (Zortalbi) from Morvi, a claim Morvi contested. The case was initially heard by Captain Hebbert, where the decision went largely against Morvi. However, Asharam accompanied Thakur Sahib Rawaji to Mumbai to appeal the decision. There, they met with the Governor, Sir Seymour Vesey-FitzGerald. Asharam assisted in drafting the appeals and provided critical data to the state solicitors. The Bombay Government's final resolution overturned significant parts of the lower ruling, resulting in a favorable outcome for Morvi.

==== Suppression of Outlaws (Bahirvatu) ====
Following the death of Thakur Sahib Rawaji, Morvi was placed under joint administration during the minority of Waghji II. During this period, the state was plagued by "Bahirvatu" (armed outlawry) by the Deda chieftains and Miyana tribesmen.

The Deda Girassias had gone into outlawry against the state, kidnapping citizens and looting villages. Asharam was appointed to work with Superintendent Ghelabhai to track them. Through a combination of military pressure and negotiation, they recovered hostages. Later, Asharam facilitated a meeting between the outlaws and the Queen Mother, Monghiba, at Viramgam to negotiate a surrender. When the negotiations failed due to the obstinacy of the younger outlaws, Asharam warned them that the era of leniency was over, and they would face destruction by the British Raj—a prediction that came true when they were eventually killed or captured.

=== Administrator of Maliya ===
Recognizing his ability to handle turbulent territories, the British Political Agent appointed Asharam as the Administrator (Karbhari) of Maliya state, a jurisdiction notorious for the lawlessness of the Miyana tribe.

The Miyanas were a martial tribe known for looting and resisting authority. Asharam implemented a strict policy of disarmament. During the Second Anglo-Afghan War, a British cavalry regiment passed through Maliya. A dispute arose between the Miyanas and the soldiers, leading to the murder of a British sentry guarding the Commanding Officer's tent. Seizing this incident as proof of their danger, Asharam successfully petitioned the Agency to allow the total disarmament of the tribe. He confiscated cartloads of weapons, significantly reducing crime in the area.

=== Manager of Lathi State ===
In July 1886, Asharam was appointed as the Manager of Lathi State by Colonel Watson. The ruler of Lathi was the minor Thakur Sursinhji Takhtasinhji Gohil, who would later become famous as the Gujarati poet Kalapi.

Asharam managed the state for seven years (until 1893) while Sursinhji studied at the Rajkumar College, Rajkot. Asharam acted as a mentor to the young prince. It was during Asharam's tenure that Sursinhji's marriage was celebrated, an event attended by the renowned poet Dalpatram and the younger poet Manishankar Ratnaji Bhatt ('Kant'). This gathering at Lathi is noted as the first meeting between these literary figures.

In the winter of 1891–92, a gang of Miyana outlaws raided the outskirts of Lathi. Despite being in his 50s, Asharam personally led a small cavalry force to besiege the outlaws who were hiding in a stepwell. A gun battle ensued, lasting the entire day, though the outlaws managed to escape under the cover of darkness.

=== Later career ===
After handing over the administration of Lathi to the adult ruler, Asharam served briefly as the manager of Chuda state and later as the administrator of Bantwa and Sardargadh (Gidad). He retired from active service in 1898 at the age of 56, rejecting offers to extend his service, in order to pursue religious and literary interests.

== Retirement and Religious Service ==
In his retirement, Asharam settled in Ahmedabad and devoted his time to the Ahmedabad Swaminarayan Temple. Following the death of Acharya Purushottamprasadji in 1901, a succession dispute arose regarding the temple's leadership and assets. Asharam was appointed as a trustee and worked for several years to protect the interests of the minor heir, Acharya Vasudevprasadji. He managed the temple's estates and legal battles without accepting any remuneration, eventually ensuring the safe installation of the young Acharya.

== Literary Works ==
Asharam Shah is best known in Gujarati literature for his work in folklore and proverbs.

He spent over twenty years collecting Gujarati proverbs, idioms, and sayings, and published the results in Gujarati Kahevat Sangraha (A Collection of Gujarati Proverbs) in 1911. The work organizes these expressions with information on their meanings, variant forms, and regional usage across Gujarat, and often notes the circumstances or anecdotes associated with their origin. It also traces proverbs derived from Sanskrit and records their later forms, and in many cases provides corresponding examples from Hindi and Marathi.

He continued to revise and expand the collection until his death. A second, significantly enlarged edition was published posthumously by his sons in 1923. The work remains a key reference text for Gujarati folklore and linguistics.

His son Mulchand had written his biography, Asharam Dalichand Shah ane Temno Samay (1934).

== Personal life ==
Asharam was described as a man of tall stature and strong physical build. He was a skilled horseman and marksman, retaining the ability to shoot accurately well into his seventies.

He married twice. His first wife died young. His second wife, Manchhaba, survived him. He had two sons who reached adulthood:

- Mulchand Asharam Shah: He became a lawyer and later wrote his father's biography, Asharam Dalichand Shah ane Temno Samay.
- Lallubhai Asharam Shah (1873–1926): A distinguished jurist who became a Judge of the Bombay High Court and was knighted by the British government.

Asharam died on 26 March 1921 at the age of 79.

=== Bibliography ===
- Asharam Dalichand Shah (1911). Gujarati Kahevat Sangraha or A collection of Gujarati proverbs (PDF).
- Shah, Mulchand Asharam (1934). Asharam Dalichand Shah ane Temno Samay (In Gujarati). Ahmedabad: Aditya Mudranalaya.

== See also ==
- List of Gujarati-language writers
