= November 1920 =

Month of 1920

<<	November 1920					>>
Su	Mo	Tu	We	Th	Fr	Sa
	1	2	3	4	5	6
7	8	9	10	11	12	13
14	15	16	17	18	19	20
21	22	23	24	25	26	27
28	29	30

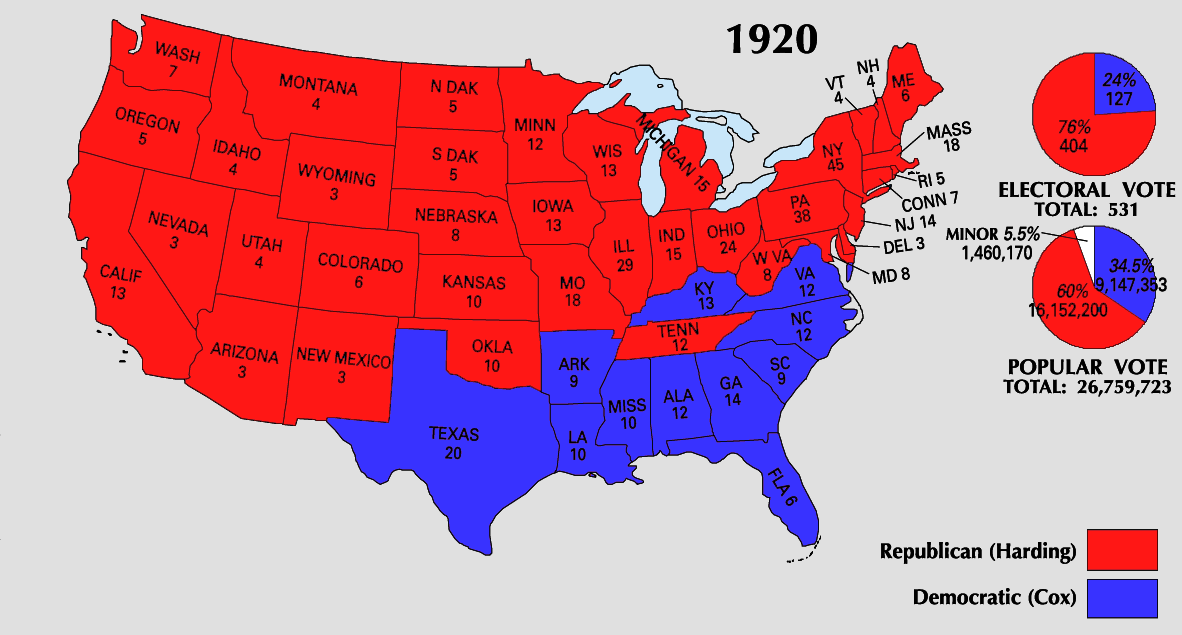
November 2, 1920: Warren G. Harding elected U.S. president with 60% of the popular vote, 76% of the electoral vote

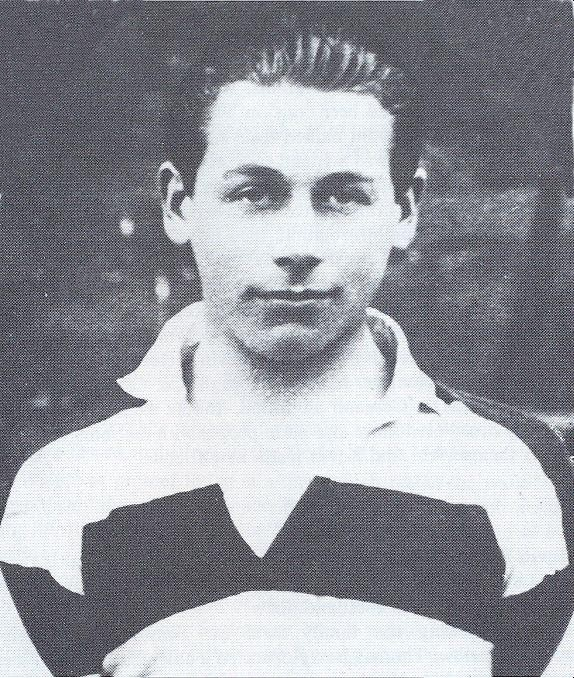
November 2, 1920: Execution of teenager Kevin Barry triggers escalating violence in Ireland

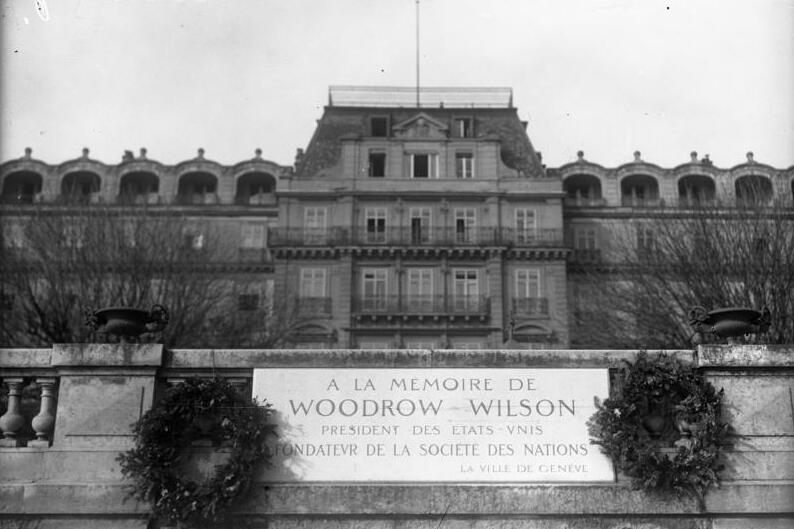
November 15, 1920: League of Nations holds its first session at its permanent location in Geneva

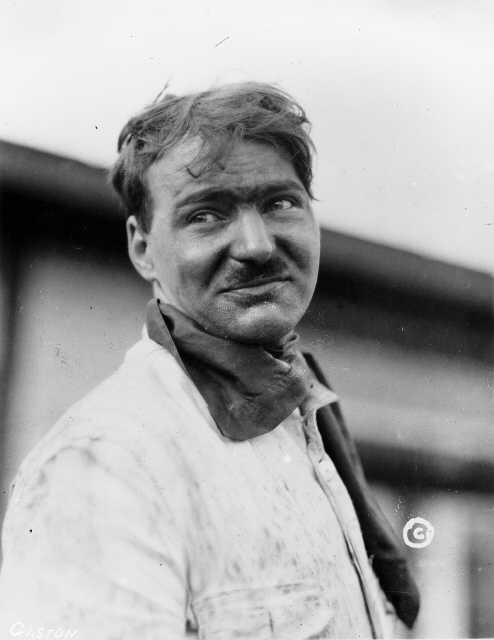
November 25, 1920: Gaston Chevrolet and other racers killed in crash in last event of season, wins U.S. driving title

== November 1, 1920 (Monday) ==
- Dr. Alfredo Zayas was elected President of Cuba, defeating the Liberal candidate, former president José Miguel Gómez.
- On the eve of the U.S. presidential election, the father of candidate Warren G. Harding went to the press to deny rumors that candidate Harding had African-American ancestry. Dr. George Tryon Harding went into downtown Marion, Ohio, and angrily confronted Probate Judge William S. Spencer, accusing him of circulating a photo and literature that said that Dr. Harding's father was African-American. Judge Spencer executed an affidavit, denying that he had contributed to the rumor, before Dr. Harding apologized.
- Employees of the Faxton Hospital in Utica, New York, made a desperate search of sewer lines serving the institution, hoping to find one milligram of radium that Dr. George Fletcher had applied, in a small vial under a bandage, to a female patient as a means of treating breast cancer." The unidentified patient was irritated by the burning of the radium, went into a bathroom and flushed the vial and its radioactive material, valued at $13,000 at the time, down a toilet. Despite the excavation of the sewer system, there was no subsequent report of the recovery of the radium.
- Born: James J. Kilpatrick, American journalist and conservative TV commentator for 60 Minutes; in Oklahoma City, Oklahoma(d. 2010)
- Died: Kevin Barry, 18, Irish republican convicted in a military tribunal for the September murder of three British soldiers; hanged at Mountjoy Jail in Dublin, sparking outrage in Ireland over the execution of a teenager. Barry's hanging, shortly after 7:00 in the morning, was "the first execution that has taken place in connection with Sinn Fein disturbances;" in 14 attacks across Ireland later in the day, six policemen were killed in reprisal for Barry's death. In a ceremony in Dublin almost 80 years later, Barry and nine other celebrated martyrs in the Irish War of Independence, would be disinterred from the grounds of Mountjoy and buried with full state honors at Glasnevin Cemetery (b. 1902).

== November 2, 1920 (Tuesday) ==
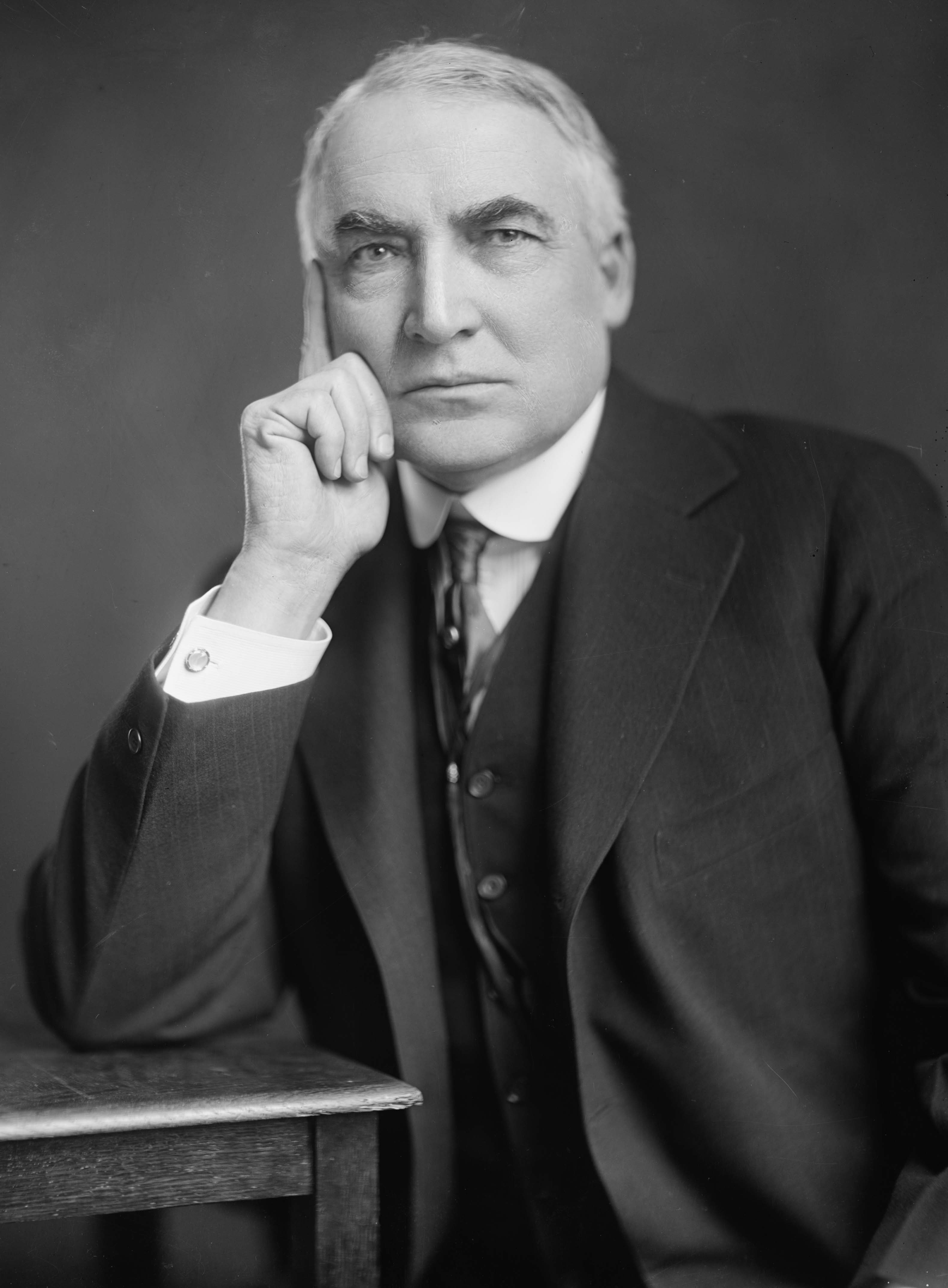
Republican Warren G. Harding, Democrat James M. Cox
- Ohio U.S. Senator Warren G. Harding, the Republican nominee, was elected President of the United States in a landslide, winning more than 60% of the vote and 404 electoral votes compared to 127 for Ohio Governor James M. Cox, and almost 17 million popular votes to Cox's 9 million. Although Governor Cox did not make a comment, the newspaper that he owned, the Dayton News, printed an extra edition at 11:00 pm with the headline "Republican Landslide; Harding Wins." In the U.S. House of Representatives, the balance was 307 Republicans against only 127 Democrats, and the Republicans' slim 49 to 47 majority in the U.S. Senate increased to 59 to 37.
- The first licensed commercial radio station in the U.S., KDKA of Pittsburgh, made its debut, as 8ZZ, by broadcasting news updates of the presidential and other elections with a speed unmatched by printed news. "Those results were borrowed from a newspaper but", a historian would later write, "for individuals with a radio receiver, managed to arrive much more rapidly." The Westinghouse Electric Company, owner of KDKA, had been transmitting instructions for two weeks before the election. With Leo Rosenberg as the anchorman for the broadcast, the results could be picked up by wireless receivers within a 500 miles (800 km) radius of Pittsburgh. Although KDKA would be the lone U.S. radio station for ten months, 30 stations would be broadcasting by 1922 and over 500 by 1924.

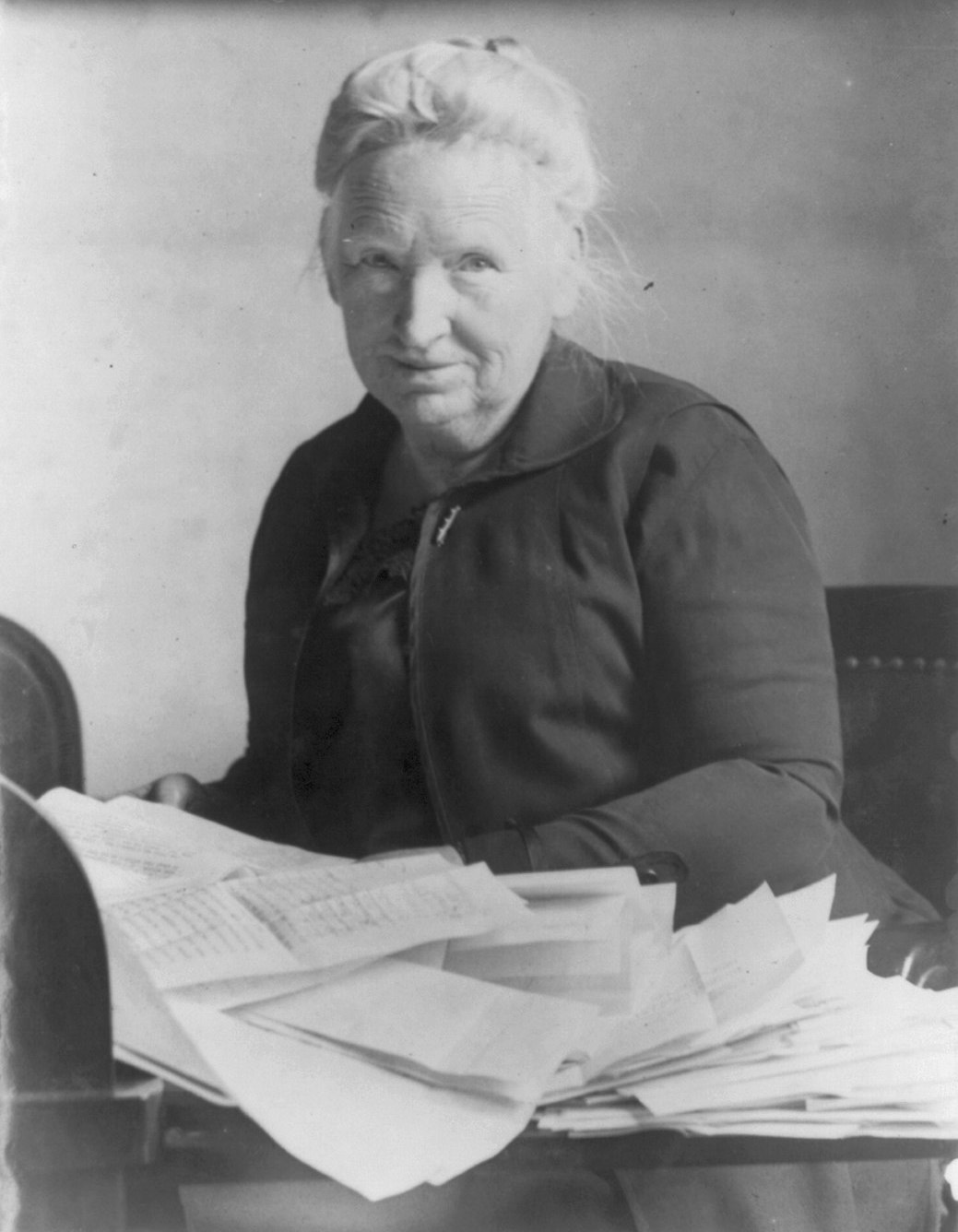
Rep. Robertson (R-Okla.)

- Alice Robertson of Oklahoma, a Republican, was elected as the U.S. representative for 2nd congressional district in the northeastern part of that state, defeating incumbent Democrat William W. Hastings. Robertson was only the second woman to serve in Congress, after Jeannette Rankin had been elected in Montana in 1916.
- Referendums were held in towns across Scotland on the issue of whether to ban the sale of liquor, with 18 districts banning the sale, 24 restricting sale of certain types of alcohol, and 149 staying "wet."
- The Ocoee massacre began at the black community of Ocoee, Florida, when a white mob carried out the murder of six African Americans after two white men were shot to death while trying to arrest Jules Perry, a black man who had attempted to vote earlier in the day but was denied on grounds that he hadn't paid the poll tax. The white mob then burned down the house from which the shots had been fired to kill the white vigilantes, killing the five men inside. Perry was then taken from the city jail and lynched.
- Born: Rocco Morabito, American photographer, Pulitzer Prize winner; in Port Chester, New York (d. 2009)
- Died:
  - Louise Imogen Guiney, 59, American poet and essayist; died of a stroke (b. 1861)
  - James Daly, 22, Irish nationalist and British Army lieutenant with the Connaught Rangers in British India; executed by a firing squad after his court-martial conviction of mutiny. Private Daly remains the last member of the British armed forces to be executed for mutiny (b. 1899)

== November 3, 1920 (Wednesday) ==
- After the initial killing of six African Americans, the Ocoee massacre continued as the Ku Klux Klan returned to burn the homes of other black residents of the town of Ocoee, Florida, near Orlando. Estimates range from 50 to 65 additional murders of black residents in the northern section of town until dawn. In the aftermath, black residents in the southern section were intimidated into moving away.
- With a 75 percent vote necessary to continue plans for a strike, British coal miners fell short, rejecting a proposed settlement by only a small majority.
- The Inter-Allied Control Commission met at Munich to request that Bavaria disarm its militia detachments.
- Born: Oodgeroo Noonuccal, aboriginal Australian poet and activist; as Kathleen Jean Mary Ruska, on Stradbroke Island, Queensland (d. 1993)
- Died: Warren Terhune, 51, United States Navy Commander, Governor of American Samoa; committed suicide by shooting himself in the chest (b. 1869)

== November 4, 1920 (Thursday) ==
- The capsizing of the Philippines steamer San Basilio killed 44 of the 64 people on board as the ship was trying to anchor off of the island of Leyte during a typhoon. Although some of the 44 drowned while trying to swim to one of the lifeboats of San Basilio, others were killed by sharks before they could reach safety.
- Deutsche Bank announced that its capital had increased from 275 million to 400 million marks in the two years since the end of World War One, and that it would use the capital to buy three other banks in Germany, the Gothaer Privatbank, Hannoversche Bank and Braunschweigische Bank.
- Former Vermont Governor Horace F. Graham, convicted of embezzlement of state funds while he had served as State Auditor, was sentenced to five years at hard labor in the state penitentiary. Two hours later, incumbent Governor Percival W. Clement issued Graham a pardon for all crimes.
- Died: Ludwig von Struve, 62, German astronomer; died of a stroke (b. 1858)

== November 5, 1920 (Friday) ==
- At a press conference at the crowded ballroom of the Hotel Claridge in New York City, world heavyweight boxing champion Jack Dempsey and world light heavyweight champion and European heavyweight champ Georges Carpentier formally signed a contract to face each other in an eagerly-anticipated "Fight of the Century". Each fighter would receive an unprecedented amount of money — $500,000 (equivalent to $7.6 million in 2023). The date and location of the bout remained to be negotiated, but it would eventually take place on July 2, 1921, in Jersey City, New Jersey.
- Born: Douglass North, American economist, recipient of the 1993 Nobel Prize in Economic Sciences; in Cambridge, Massachusetts (d. 2015)

== November 6, 1920 (Saturday) ==
- The Princeton University Tigers, who claim a share of the mythical college football championship for 1920, suffered the only blemish in a season of six wins and no losses after the unbeaten Harvard Crimson overcame a 14–7 deficit in the final minute to tie the game, 14 to 14. Princeton finished with a 6-0-1 record and outscored its opponents, 144 points to 23. The other claimant, the California Golden Bears, scored 510 points to its opponents 14, had a record of 9-0-0 with six shutouts, including its postseason Rose Bowl win against unbeaten Ohio State University.

== November 7, 1920 (Sunday) ==
- Under the command of General Mikhail Frunze, 135,000 Soviet troops began a 10-day final offensive to end the Southern Front of the Russian Civil War and driving the rebel White Army from the Crimean peninsula. By November 13, General Pyotr Wrangel and most of his other White Army subordinates and soldiers began a desperate evacuation from Sevastopol, Yalta and other ports before the Soviets arrived on November 16.
- The Soviet Union celebrated the third anniversary of the October Revolution with the first staging of mass theatrical production, The Storming of the Winter Palace (Vziatie zhmnego dvorsta), with 8,000 participants directed by Nikolai Evreinov for an audience of 100,000 spectators in at the square in front of the Winter Palace in Saint Petersburg.
- Died: Samuel Meltzer, 69, American physiologist (b. 1851)

== November 8, 1920 (Monday) ==
- After the clubs within the two 8-team major baseball leagues could not agree on whether to have a powerful executive to control the sport, the peaceful coexistence of baseball's American League and National League came to an end. Three AL teams (the Red Sox, White Sox and Yankees), opposed to AL President Ban Johnson, broke with the other five and agreed a plan to organize a new 12-team National League— composed of two franchises each in Boston (Braves and Red Sox), New York (Giants and Yankees), Chicago (Cubs and White Sox), the remaining five other NL teams (Brooklyn Dodgers, Cincinnati Reds, Pittsburgh Pirates, St. Louis Cardinals and Philadelphia Phillies), as New York, Chicago and Boston AL franchises jumped to the National League. A 12th team was to be selected before the 1921 baseball season. The American League announced that it would operate in 1921 as a six team circuit, consisting of the Cleveland Indians, Detroit Tigers, Philadelphia Athletics, St. Louis Browns, Washington Senators and a new Boston Americans franchise.
- The popular British comic strip Rupert Bear, by Mary Tourtel, made its debut as a feature in the London newspaper, the Daily Express.
- The U.S. Supreme Court ruled that private stocks of liquor could be moved and stored by their owners without violating the 18th Amendment.
- Born:
  - Esther Rolle, African American actress, Emmy Award winner and Golden Globe nominee; in Pompano Beach, Florida (d. 1998)
  - Sitara Devi, Indian Kathak dancer, singer and actress; as Dhanalakshmi, in Calcutta, Bengal Presidency, British India (present-day Kolkata, West Bengal) (d. 2014)
- Died:
  - Nectarios of Aegina, 74, Eastern Orthodox Metropolitan bishop, recognized as a saint in 1961; died of cancer (b. 1846)
  - Abraham Kuyper, 83, Prime Minister of the Netherlands from 1901 to 1905, Neo-Calvinist pastor (b. 1837)
  - Alberto Blest Gana, 90, Chilean novelist and diplomat, ambassador to France and the United Kingdom (b. 1830)

== November 9, 1920 (Tuesday) ==
Flag of the Free City of Danzig

- At Paris, representatives of Poland and the Free City of Danzig (created for the predominantly German-speaking residents of Poland by the Treaty of Versailles) signed an agreement recognizing the semi-autonomous state under the authority of a League of Nations Commissioner, belonging to neither Poland nor Germany. In return for the recognition, Poland received the free use and service of the railway system, waterways and seaports within the Danzig state.

== November 10, 1920 (Wednesday) ==
- Cecil L'Estrange Malone, an Englishman and a liberal M.P. in the House of Commons (and later the first member of the Communist Party of Great Britain to serve in the Commons), was arrested outside Trinity College Dublin, where he had been invited to speak. Malone was charged with sedition for a November 6 speech in London Albert Hall, specifically his statement that "I hope the day will soon come when we shall meet here to pass a blessing on the British revolution... When that day comes, woe to all those people who get in our way." Referring to two British politicians by name as persons who might be hanged in public, Malone had stated, "What are a few Churchills or a few Curzon lamp posts compared with the misery of thousands of human beings?" and was picked up before he could encourage similar sentiments in Ireland. He would later be sentenced to six months imprisonment under the Defence of the Realm Act 1914.
- Died: Thomas B. Howard, 66, United States Navy officer, commander of the U.S. Pacific Fleet (b. 1854)

== November 11, 1920 (Thursday) ==
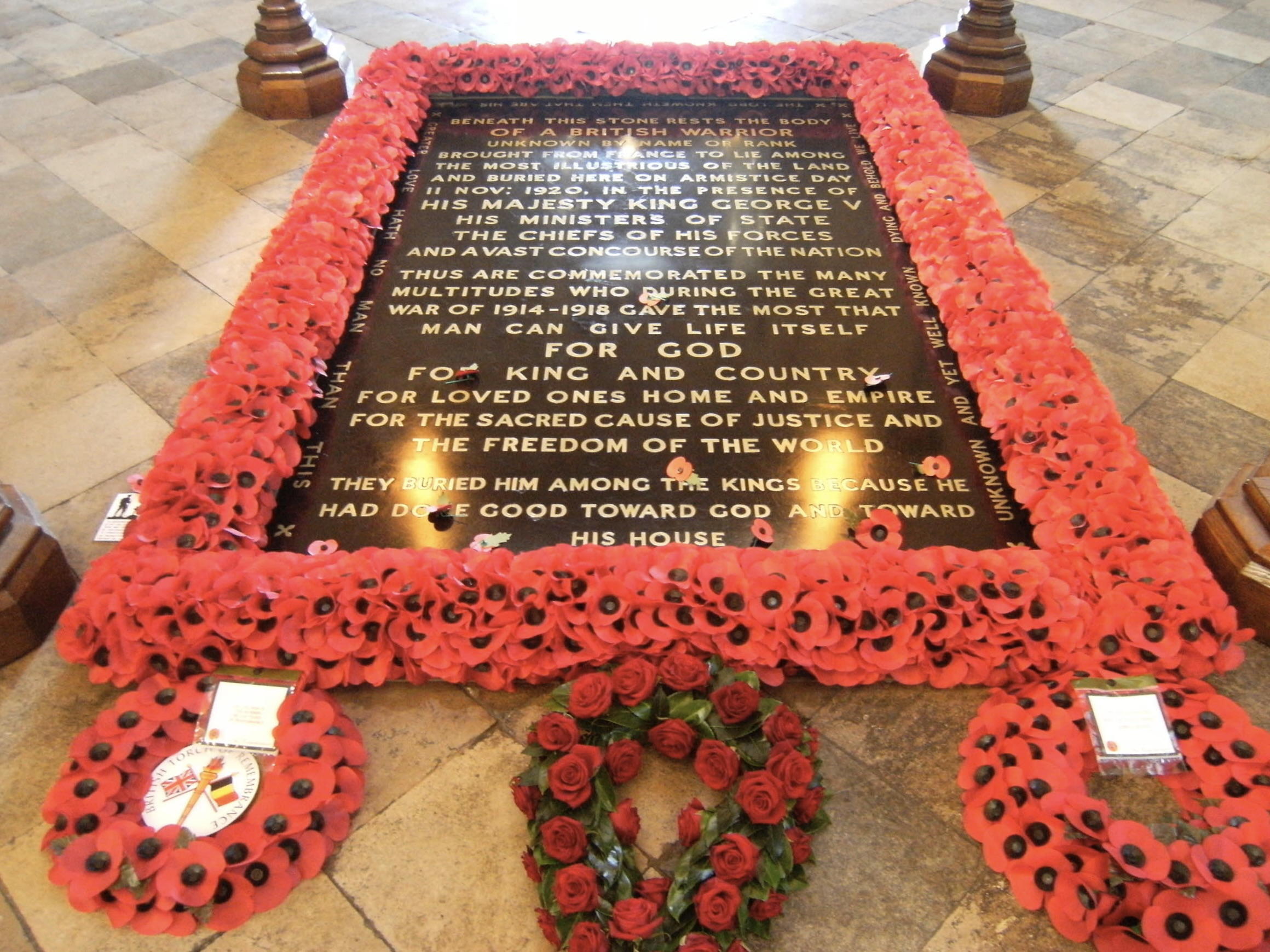
The Unknown Warrior, London

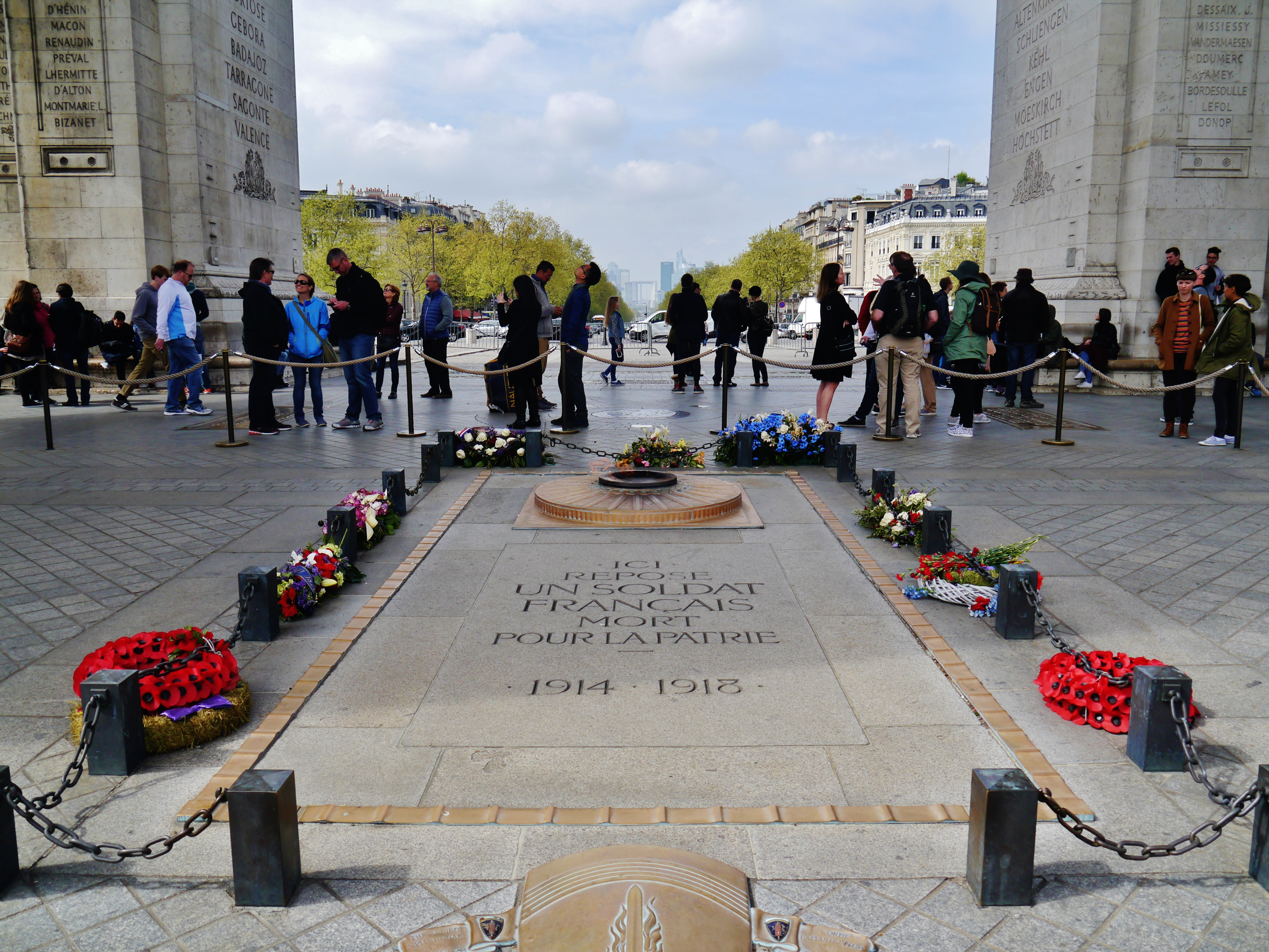
Tombe du Soldat inconnu, Paris

- France and the United Kingdom both interred the remains of a casualty of World War One whose remains could not be identified, creating the first monument of a Tomb of the Unknown Soldier. In simultaneous ceremonies on the second anniversary of the Armistice of 11 November 1918 that ended the Great War, the British dedicated The Unknown Warrior at Westminster Abbey while France's La tombe du Soldat inconnu was consecrated beneath the Arc de Triomphe in Paris. The person buried at Westminster Abbey had been one of four unidentified British Army soldiers, each exhumed from a different battlefield in France, and transported to Saint-Pol-sur-Ternoise. On November 7, Brigadier General Louis J. Wyatt selected the remains of a soldier at random and then transported by HMS Verdun to Britain. In all, there were 517,773 unidentified combatants who fought for the United Kingdom. The soldier selected for the Arc de Triomphe was picked at random from eight oak caskets, each drawn from a site in eastern France of a major battle during the Great War, and placed in the Citadelle of Verdun. August Thin, a veteran of the war from the Verdun unit, laid a bouquet of violets on the sixth of the eight caskets.
- By a vote of 183 to 52, the Irish Home Rule bill passed its third and final reading in the UK House of Commons, with a provision for a dual parliament and religious freedom, while Ireland's foreign affairs, coinage, defense, taxation and wireless and cable communications would remain under British control.
- Born: Walter Krupinski, German fighter ace pilot, credited with 197 downed aircraft in World War II; in Domnau, East Prussia (present-day Domnovo, Poland) (d. 2000)

== November 12, 1920 (Friday) ==
- The longest hunger strike in history ended on its 94th day at the Cork County Gaol in Ireland, after the nine surviving Irish nationalists agreed to receive food at the request of Sinn Féin founder Arthur Griffith. Eleven prisoners had not eaten since August 11 after joining the cause of Cork Mayor Terence MacSwiney, and two had died in October. MacSwiney had died on October 24 in Brixton Prison in London.

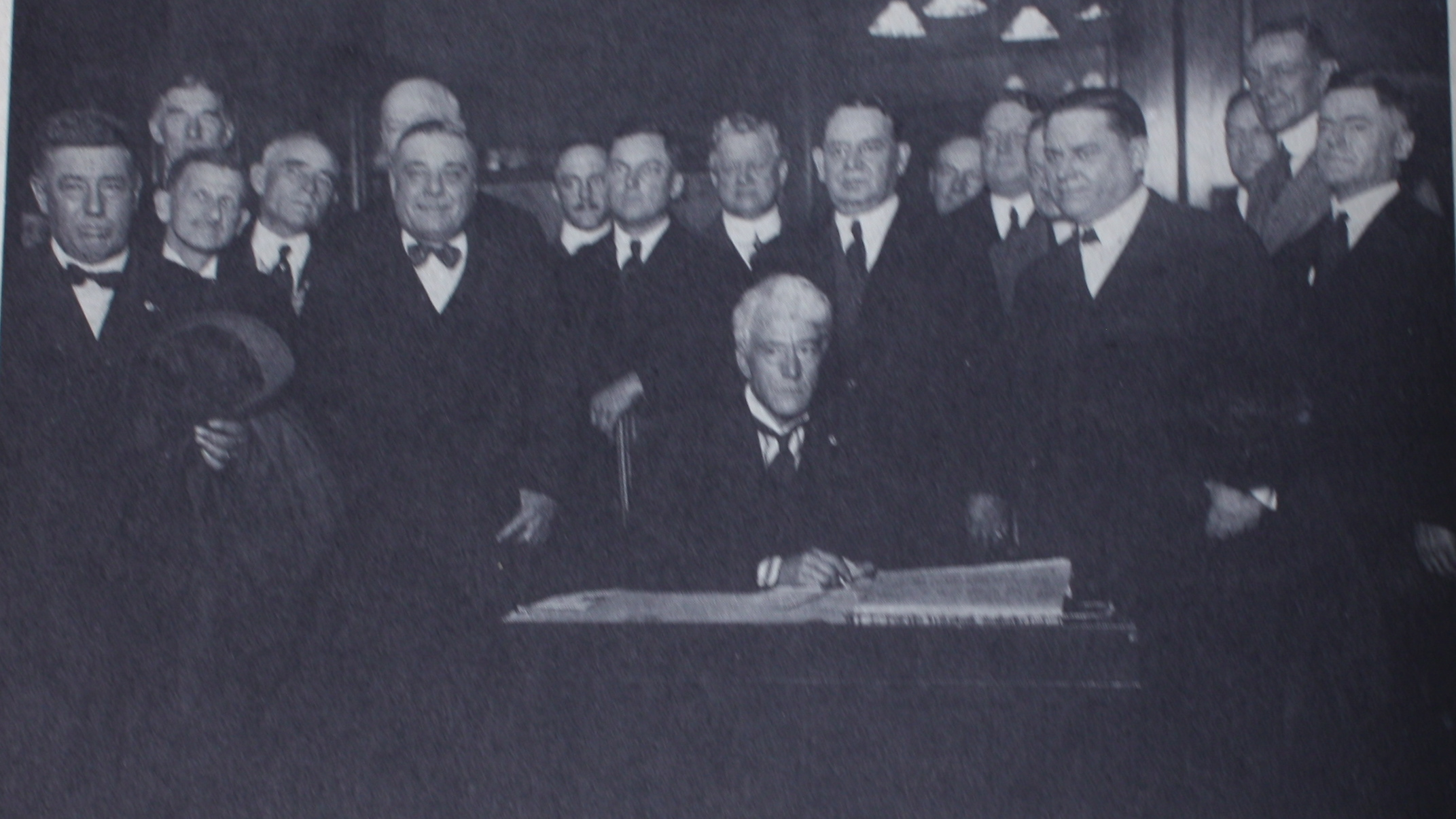
Commissioner Landis and the owners

- The current organization of Major League Baseball, with the National League and American League being under the authority of a single executive, rather than operating as two organizations, began as the owners of the 16 teams in the two leagues voted unanimously to hire federal Judge Kenesaw Mountain Landis as the first MLB Commissioner. Since 1905, Landis had presided over the U.S. District Court for the Northern Illinois in Chicago. After coming under criticism for presiding over baseball and the federal district court during the 1921 baseball season, Landis would step down from the federal court on March 1, 1922.
- Italy and Yugoslavia signed a treaty to settle their territorial claims on islands in the Adriatic Sea separating the two nations and land on the eastern side of the Adriatic that had been captured by Italy from Austria-Hungary during World War One. The pact executed at the Italian seaside resort of Rapallo, near Genoa. Under the agreement, Dalmatia (Dalmacija), Longatico (Logatec), Sebenico (Šibenik) went to Yugoslavia and 11 square miles (28 km^{2}) of former Croatian territory was created as a semi-independent buffer state as the Free State of Fiume. Italy received the islands of Cherso, Lussino and Unie (now Cres, Lošinj and Unije off the coast of Croatia).
- Austria applied for admission to the League of Nations.
- Film actress Mildred Harris was granted a divorce from film comedian Charlie Chaplin after two years, following a finding by a Los Angeles court that grounds existed to dissolve the marriage on grounds of "cruelty," the basis for the vast majority of uncontested divorces in California at the time. Harris and Chaplin had agreed to a property settlement of payment to her of US$200,000 (roughly $3.1 million in 2023) in return for her agreement not to use the Chaplin name professionally.
- U.S. President Woodrow Wilson announced that he would not sign the execution warrant for former U.S. Army Sergeant Anthony F. Tamme, who had been convicted in a court-martial of espionage, desertion and violations of the Articles of War of the United States. The court-martial at Camp Travis, Texas, had recommended a sentence of death by firing squad for Tamme, whose real name was Antonio Tuminia.
- Villa Maria College was founded as Philadelphia's first Catholic college for women, in the town of Malvern, Pennsylvania, with the granting of a charter by Pennsylvania to the sisters of the Servants of the Immaculate Heart of Mary. In 1929, it would change its name to Immaculata College and, since 2002, Immaculata University. Immaculata would admit its first male students in 2005.
- Born: Josip Boljkovac, Croatian politician, Interior Minister from 1990 to 1991, later charged for war crimes; in Vukova Gorica, Kingdom of Serbs, Croats and Slovenes (present-day Croatia) (d. 2014)

== November 13, 1920 (Saturday) ==
- A group of teenagers carried out the largest train robbery in U.S. history, up to that time, after breaking into a rail car on the Chicago, Burlington and Quincy Railroad after it was loaded with a United States Mint shipment of currency, bonds and gold at Omaha, Nebraska. The U.S. Post Office charter was part of a transfer of monies from San Francisco to Chicago. At the train's first stop outside of Omaha, the robbers emptied the bags from the car and loaded them into a waiting automobile, unaware that the mailbags were carrying more than the normal amount of money orders and cash. The amount stolen, originally thought to be one million dollars was soon revealed to be more than $3,500,000 (equivalent to almost $46 million in 2020). The ringleader was 17 years old and aided by his younger brother and another young accomplice. Much of the money was burned, and only a small amount was recovered.
- Born:
  - Jack Elam, American film and television actor, known for his roles as villains in Western films; as William Scott Elam, in Miami, Arizona (d. 2003)
  - K. G. Ramanathan, Indian mathematician; as Kollagunta Gopalaiyer Ramanathan, in Hyderabad, British India (now Telangana state) (d. 1992)
- Died: Luc-Olivier Merson, 74, French illustrator, known for his designs of France's currency and postage stamps (b. 1846)

== November 14, 1920 (Sunday) ==
- Parliamentary elections were held in Greece for the 370 seats of the National Assembly. The result was a surprising loss for the Prime Minister Eleftherios Venizelos and his Liberal Party, who had expected to win easily.
- Defeated by the Soviet Army, Russian White Army General Pyotr Wrangel fled from the Crimea on the French warship Sebastopol. Wrangel's Prime Minister of the rebel government arrived at Constantinople and conceded that the Soviets had won the Russian Civil War.
- Hungary's Constituent Assembly voted to ratify the Treaty of Trianon, which was part of the Treaty of Versailles, under threat of an invasion by the armies of Britain, France and Italy. The deputies reportedly "rose and sang the National anthem and then voted for ratification amid absolute silence." Many of the legislators then walked out of the chamber. Prime Minister Karl Huszar "ordered that the black flag of mourning should fly over public buildings during the application of the treaty... lamenting the crushing weight of the terms imposed."
- Banks in the U.S. state of North Dakota began failing; within 10 days, 13 had closed their doors to depositors.
- Six children between the ages of 3 and 10 years old were killed in New York City, and 12 other children seriously injured, in a panic at the Catheirne Theatre when a clogged furnace sent smoke into the auditorium during a movie. Although there was no fire, smaller children were trampled during the panic to flee the theater.
- Born: Mary Greyeyes, Canadian Women’s Army Corps officer, first indigenous woman in the Canadian Armed Forces; at the Muskeg Lake Cree Nation reserve at Marcelin, Saskatchewan (d. 2011)

== November 15, 1920 (Monday) ==
- The Assembly of the League of Nations held its first session at its new headquarters in Geneva, with 41 nations represented. All of the major nations of the world except for the United States, Russia, Germany and Mexico were members at the first session. Reporter Edwin L. James of The New York Times wrote, "For the first time in the history of mankind forty-one nations of the world sat together in common council... White, black and brown men sat beneath the same roof and under the same roof and under the same providing officer." Paul Hymans, formerly the Foreign Minister of Belgium, was selected as the first permanent President of the League of Nations, with 35 of the delegate votes.
- In the midst of the Evacuation of the Crimea by the White Army during the Russian Civil War, the former Imperial Russian destroyer Zhivoy sank in a storm in the Black Sea along with the 250 crew and passengers on board.
- Greek Prime Minister Eleftherios Venizelos claimed victory in the parliamentary elections held the previous day, but was forced to concede defeat later in the day.
- Yerevan, the capital of Armenia, was evacuated as Turkish troops and Soviet troops approached.
- The U.S. Census Bureau released figures to show that the year 1919 had the lowest death rate— 12.9 per 1,000 people— ever recorded. Primarily because of the Spanish influenza epidemic, the death rate in 1918 was 18 per 1,000 people.
- The city of Sugar Creek, Missouri, was incorporated.
- Born: Wayne Thiebaud, American painter; as Morton Wayne Thiebaud, in Mesa, Arizona (d. 2021)

== November 16, 1920 (Tuesday) ==
- Qantas, now the national airline of Australia, was founded by aviators Hudson Fysh, Paul McGinness, Fergus McMaster and Arthur Baird, aviators operating an airstrip in the remote town of Winton, Queensland in order to provide service to villages in the Outback. The name is an acronym for Queensland and Northern Territory Aerial Services.
- The use of the postage meter as an alternative to postage stamps was approved by the U.S. Post Office Department, after lobbying by inventor Arthur Pitney and entrepreneur Walter Bowes, creators of the Pitney Bowes Postage Meter Company. The original machine for applying postage was the Model M. The Postmaster General had previously approved, on September 1, the official imprint used by the meter to show the amount of the postage purchased from the post office.
- The Western Union company announced that it would not send messages by cable for the U.S. government without being paid in advance. Newcomb Carlton, the president of the company, said that the U.S. State Department had not paid for its service since August, 1919. Two days later, Western Union reversed its policy after retired Admiral William S. Benson, the director of the United States Shipping Board announced that the federal government would use another private cable operator, the Postal Telegraph Company for all future business.
- Sul Ross State University began its first classes, serving 77 students as the two-year Sul Ross State Normal College in Alpine, Texas, in the far western part of the state. SRSU now has 2,000 students on two campuses. The college was named in honor of the late Lawrence Sullivan Ross, a former Governor of Texas.
- Born: Eric P. Hamp, British-born American linguist; in London (d. 2019)

== November 17, 1920 (Wednesday) ==
- Dimitrios Rallis formed a cabinet as the new Prime Minister and Foreign Minister of Greece.
- The Talang Tuo inscription, dating from the year 684 CE, was discovered by Dutch explorer Louis Westernenk on the Indonesian island of Sumatra, near Palembang.
- Born: George Dunning, Canadian-born British film animator and director, known for the 1968 psychedelic Beatles film Yellow Submarine; in Toronto (d. 1979)

== November 18, 1920 (Thursday) ==
- By government decree, the Soviet Union became the first nation to legalize abortion, its main purpose being "to reduce the high mortality rate associated with illegal abortions." Under the law, repealed by a second decree in 1936, abortion was available during the first trimester of pregnancy at the request of the woman.
- Sixteen members of a work crew of 33 lumberjacks were drowned in Maine's Chesuncook Lake, after a boat chartered by their employer caught fire while taking the men to the lumber camp of Great Northern Paper Company. While none were injured by the fire, the survivors were those who were able to swim to shore in icy waters
- Born: Mustafa Khalil, Egyptian politician, prime minister of Egypt from 1978 to 1980, negotiator of the Camp David Accords treaty between Egypt and Israel; in Qalyubiyya Governorate, Sultanate of Egypt (d. 2008)

== November 19, 1920 (Friday) ==
- At the city of Amapala in Guatemala, representatives of Guatemala, Nicaragua, Honduras and Costa Rica signed a boundary agreement as the first step toward a reunification of Central America.
- Born:
  - Richard Sakakida, Japanese-American U.S. Army counterintelligence agent during World War II; in Honolulu, Territory of Hawaii (d. 1996)
  - Gene Tierney, American actress; in Brooklyn, New York City (d. 1991)
- Died: Mahlon M. Garland, 64, American labor leader and politician, U.S. Representative for Pennsylvania (b. 1856)

== November 20, 1920 (Saturday) ==
- An ukase, an ecclesiastical decree by Tikhon, Patriarch of Moscow and the leader of the Russian Orthodox Church, created the Russian Orthodox Church Outside Russia, directing the organization of the church for those bishops and adherents who had been forced to flee the Soviet Union. Ukase Number 362 gave a set of 10 instructions to bishops in exile on what to do if they were unable to communicate with the Patriarch himself.

== November 21, 1920 (Sunday) ==
- "Bloody Sunday" took place in Dublin, with the simultaneous morning killing of 14 members of the British intelligence unit, nicknamed "The Cairo Gang" by the Irish Republican Army (IRA), followed in the afternoon by a reprisal from the Royal Irish Constabulary that killed 14 people watching a game of Gaelic football at the Croke Park stadium, and closing with the arrest and murder of three IRA officials by local police at Dublin Castle in the evening.
  - At 9:00 in the morning, under the command of Michael Collins, groups of 6 to 8 IRA members made simultaneous home invasions around Dublin and shot members of the Cairo Gang.
  - In the afternoon, 16 trucks carrying members of the Black and Tans drove into Croke Park, where 5,000 people were watching Dublin's match against Tipperary, and the soldiers fired into the crowd, killing 11 outright and injuring dozens of others, including three who died of their wounds later.
  - In the evening, three of the IRA members who had assisted in the morning killings were tortured and then beaten to death at Dublin Castle.
- Born: Stan Musial, American Major League Baseball outfielder, three-time National League MVP, and Hall of Fame enshrinee; in Donora, Pennsylvania(d. 2013)
- Died:
  - George Giddens, 75, British stage actor
  - Michael Hogan, 24, Gaelic footballer for Tipperary; shot and killed in the Croke Park massacre on Bloody Sunday (b. 1896)

== November 22, 1920 (Monday) ==
- The DuPont chemical company made a successful move to acquire a large portion of auto manufacturer General Motors Corporation and helped relieve "one of the most violent Stock Market declines in recent years" that had started ten days earlier. Pierre S. du Pont and his associates bought all three million of the shares owned by GM founder and CEO William C. Durant for a reported US$40,000,000 (equivalent to $523 million a century later). Durant was replaced as CEO on November 30.
- Outgoing U.S. President Woodrow Wilson, acting as arbitrator for the League of Nations in delineating the boundary between the new Republic of Armenia and the Republic of Turkey, submitted his decision to the League's Supreme Council. Only 10 days later, Wilson's work became a moot point with Armenia's surrender of the western half of its territory to Turkey in the December 2 Treaty of Alexandropol.
- What was an apparent hoax was reported nationwide from the hamlet of Howesville, West Virginia, where (the news item from Morgantown said) the residents "were thrown into a panic tonight when a large meteor fell at Howesville.. according to reports received here." The news story added that "The meteor struck in the business section of Howesville, near the railroad station. It exploded as it buried itself in the earth. The force of the blast was heard for several miles. An automobile standing near the railroad station was damaged by the explosion and the occupants of the machine were dazed, but escaped injury." The dispatch added, "There are no telephones in Howesville and detailed information as to the meteor could not be obtained tonight.
- New Mexico's Governor Octaviano A. Larrazolo issued pardons to 16 Mexican followers of Pancho Villa, all of whom were serving sentences of life in prison for accompanying Villa on his attack on Columbus, New Mexico, on March 9, 1916. Villa's forces killed 15 American civilians and 10 U.S. Army soldiers in the battle that followed. Governor Larrazolo declared that the 16 convicts had no direct involvement with the killings, that they acted under duress of being killed if they disobeyed an order to accompany Villa, and that they had ridden into Columbus in the belief that they were attacking a garrison in the Mexican town of Palomas, a border town a few miles from Columbus. Of the other Mexican attackers who were captured after the raid, six were executed by hanging in 1916.
- Born: Baidyanath Misra, Indian economist; in Khordha, Bengal Presidency, British India (present-day Odisha state) (d. 2019)
- Died: George Breck, 56-57, American mural painter (b. 1863)

== November 23, 1920 (Tuesday) ==
- Anchorage, Alaska, now the largest city in the U.S. state of Alaska, was incorporated, a little more than five years after it was first settled. Leopold David took office as the new city's first Mayor.
- Died: Sir George Callaghan, 67, British naval officer and Admiral of the Fleet (b. 1852)

== November 24, 1920 (Wednesday) ==
- The unbeaten Ohio State Buckeyes football team, which had completed its schedule unbeaten and untied (7-0-0) and won the Big Ten Conference title, was selected by a committee in Pasadena, California, to represent the best Eastern U.S. college football team in the Rose Bowl. Their opponent was the Pacific Coast Conference champion, the unbeaten and untied (8-0-0) California Golden Bears. At the time, the Rose Bowl game was the only post-season college football game in the United States. On New Year's Day, California, would beat Ohio State, 28 to 0.
- U.S. President Wilson pardoned Franz von Rintelen, a German national who had been imprisoned for espionage and war conspiracy. Rintelen was released from prison upon posting a bond on condition that he leave the United States by January 1.

== November 25, 1920 (Thursday) ==
- Gimbels Department Store in Philadelphia held the first ever Thanksgiving Day parade, four years before the first annual Macy's parade in New York City. The annual parade has been held ever since, produced by Philadelphia's WPVI-TV ("6 ABC") with the financial aid of various sponsors.
- In the final event of the 1920 U.S. auto racing series, a 250-mile event at California's Beverly Hills Speedway on Thanksgiving Day, Indianapolis 500 winner Gaston Chevrolet was killed when his Frontenac racer was struck by the Duesenberg driven by Eddie O'Donnell, who had lost control on a turn on the 162nd of 200 laps. At the time, race drivers were accompanied by their mechanics in competition, and O'Donnell's mechanic, Lyall Jolls died at the scene as well. Chevrolet's mechanic, John Bresnahan, was thrown clear of the wreckage and had only minor injuries. O'Donnell died the next day in a hospital. After the race ended, American Automobile Association officials determined that Chevrolet had accumulated more points (1,030) during the season than any other driver and announced that he had won the title of "Speed King of 1920".
- The only occasion in the 20th century, of the full moon coinciding with the U.S. Thanksgiving Day, took place. The juxtaposition is rare because, as explained by one author "November's full Moon can occur on any one of the month's 30 days. At the same time, those dates play hopscotch with the date of Thanksgiving, which runs on its own cycle from as early as November 20th to as late as November 30th." The next occasion would be 98 years later, on November 22, 2018, and the juxtaposition will happen again on November 27, 2042, and November 28, 2069.
- Born:
  - Ricardo Montalbán, Mexican-born American film and television actor; in Mexico City (d. 2009)
  - Syed Putra, Raja of Perlis and the elected monarch of Malaysia as the Yang di-Pertuan Agong from 1960 to 1965; in Arau, Unfederated Malay States (present-day Malaysia) (d. 2000)
  - Noel Neill, American actress, best known for her portrayal of Lois Lane in the TV series The Adventures of Superman; in Minneapolis, Minnesota (d. 2016)
- Died: Madeline McDowell Breckinridge, 48, American feminist and suffragist; died of a stroke (b. 1872)

== November 26, 1920 (Friday) ==
- What is now listed as "The deadliest earthquake in Albania" killed 200 people, mostly in the town of Tepelenë in the southern portion of the country. According to seismological data, the 6.2 magnitude tremor struck at 8:51 UTC (9:51 in the morning local time) and lasted seven seconds, collapsing buildings.
- Queen Mother Olga, the 69-year old widow of King George I, mother of the former King Constantine I and grandmother of the late King Alexander, took the oath of office as Regent of Greece at the opening of the new Greek Parliament, pending the selection of a new monarch.
- The Catholic Syrian Bank, one of the oldest banks in India, was incorporated in Thrissur in British India's Madras Presidency (now in the Kerala state) under the Indian Companies Act 1913.
- Sixteen of the 18 people on the Chilean crew freighter W. J. Pirrie, were killed when the vessel was wrecked in a gale on the coast of the U.S. state of Washington. Two days earlier, the Pirrie, towed by another ship, Santa Rita, had departed from Tacoma toward San Francisco, with both vessels carrying lumber with an ultimate destination of Antofagasta in Chile. During a gale that threatened a collision of both ships, the Pirrie cut its tow line and was adrift. Two members of the mostly Chilean crew survived and much of the wreckage, and several bodies, washed ashore near La Push, Washington.

== November 27, 1920 (Saturday) ==
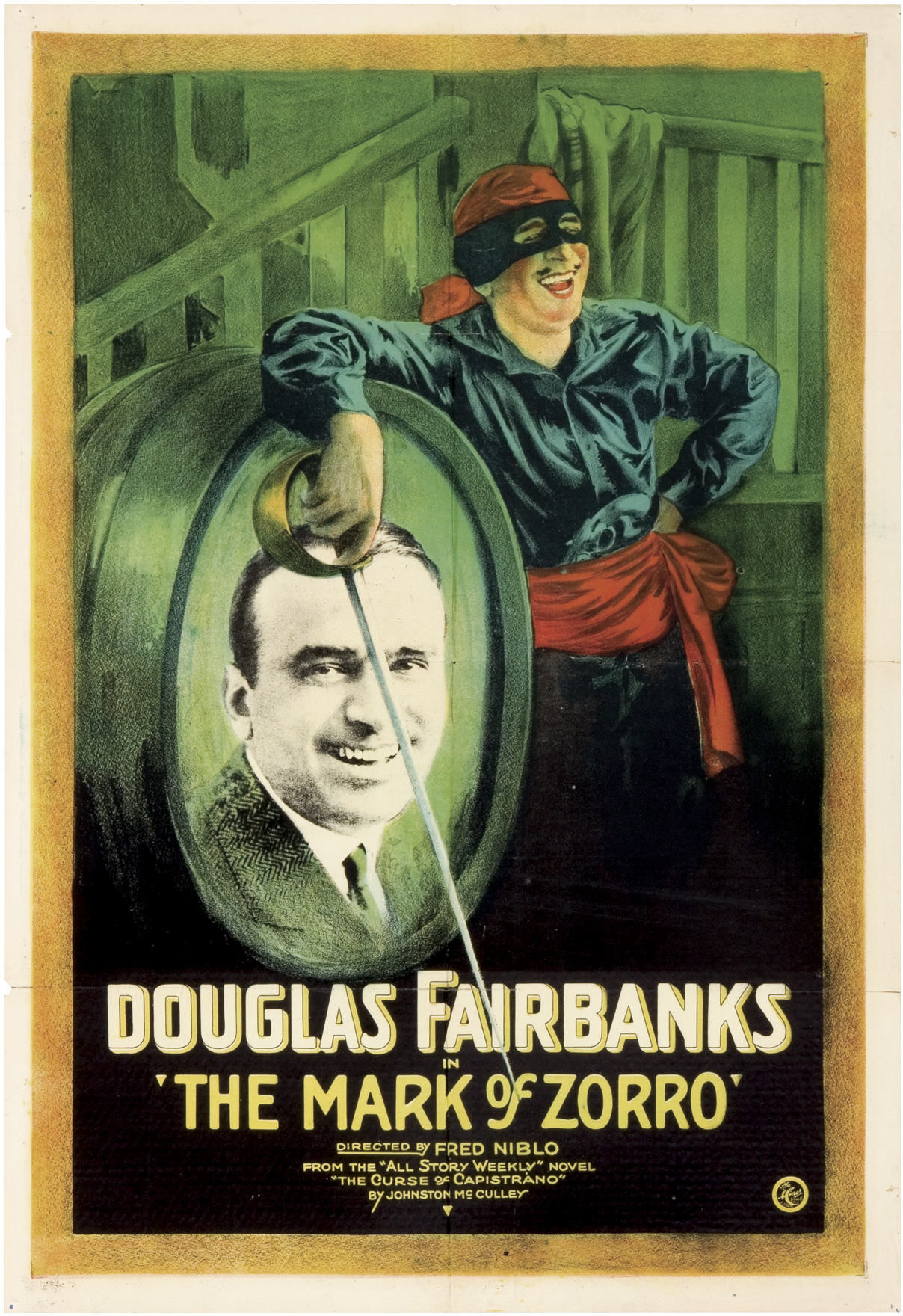

- The Mark of Zorro, a silent film starring Douglas Fairbanks as the original film hero with a cape and mask, was shown for the first time, beginning with an invitation-only premiere at the Capitol Theatre in New York City. Among those influenced by Fairbanks was Bob Kane, the creator of Batman, would later say that was a "profound influence" that had given him "the idea of the dual identity" for a character.
- Eighteen warehouses in the English city of Liverpool and its suburb, Bootle, were set fire to in one evening in what was suspected by police to be an Irish attack. Most of the buildings were cotton warehouses, torched with gasoline and paraffin shortly before 9:00 in the evening.
- Italy's Chamber of Deputies voted, 221 to 12, to approve the Treaty of Rapallo with Yugoslavia.
- Born: Buster Merryfield, English actor, known for his role as "Uncle Albert" in Only Fools and Horses; as Harry Merryfield, in Battersea, London (d. 1999)
- Died: Alexius Meinong, 67, Austrian philosopher (b. 1853)

== November 28, 1920 (Sunday) ==
- The Kilmichael Ambush was carried out in County Cork, in retaliation for the Croke Park massacre, as the Irish Republican Army attacked two truckloads of British officers who were members of the paramilitary Auxiliary Division that assisted the Royal Irish Constabulary. Part of a convoy, the trucks had been patrolling the area. and were returning from Macroom to Dunmanway, when they came under attack at Shana Cashel near Kilmichael.
- The first legislative elections in the new Kingdom of the Serbs, Croats and Slovenes— soon to become known as Yugoslavia — for the 419-member Constituent Assembly.
- FIDAC (French: Fédération Interalliée Des Anciens Combattants, English: The Interallied Federation of War Veterans Organisations) was established in Paris, at the initiative of the veterans from World War I, predominantly pacifists. At the founding meeting on 28 November 1920, FIDAC was joined by associations of veterans from France (6 associations, including UNC - National Combatants' Union and UF), United Kingdom (British Empire Service League and then British Legion), US (American Legion), Belgium (FNC), Romania (National Union of Former Combatants), Czechoslovakia (Druzina Association), Italy and Serbia.

== November 29, 1920 (Monday) ==
- The Kedukan Bukit inscription— a "roundish stone" written in the Pallava script of the Malay language and dated May 1, 683 AD — was unearthed on the banks of the Tatang River on Indonesia's island of Sumatra at Palembang. Significant as the earliest use of a symbol for the number zero (it referred to the year "604" of the local calendar) it was also the oldest example of the Malay language.
- The Army of the Soviet Union invaded the remaining territory of the short-lived Republic of Armenia, which had lost a disastrous war with Turkey. The Armenian Soviet Socialist Republic would exist as one of the constituent parts of the U.S.S.R. for more than 70 years.
- The Republic of Estonia completed three days of voting to elect the 100 deputies for its first parliament, the Riigikogu. The Estonian Social Democratic Workers' Party won a plurality, with 41 seats.
- Mingo County, West Virginia, was placed under martial law as fighting between striking coal miners and strikebreakers continued.
- Newspapers across America revealed that George Gipp, the star halfback for the Notre Dame football team was hospitalized with pneumonia following complications from tonsilitis that developed after his final game on November 20. Gipp, immortalized in sports lore and in film with the phrase "Win one for the Gipper!", died on December 14 at the age of 25.
- Born:
  - Yegor Ligachyov, Soviet and Russian politician, Politburo member and Second Secretary of the Soviet Communist Party during Mikhail Gorbachev's tenure as First Secretary; in Dubinkino, Tomsk Governorate, Russian SFSR Soviet Union) (d. 2021)
  - Bob Wolff, American sportscaster; in New York City (d. 2017)

== November 30, 1920 (Tuesday) ==
- France's National Assembly voted, 387 to 195, to renew diplomatic relations with the Vatican after 47 years. In a separate vote, the re-establishment of a French Embassy in Vatican City was approved, 397 to 209. France had severed relations with Vatican in 1873 after the Franco-Prussian War.
- Charles Ponzi, known for defrauding investors in a practice which would thereafter bear his name as a "Ponzi scheme," pleaded guilty to one of two federal indictments for using the U.S. mail for the purpose of fraud. Ponzi was sentenced to five years in prison, the maximum sentence allowed, at Plymouth, Massachusetts. A fine, also part of the maximum sentence, was waived because Ponzi had gone bankrupt and had no resources to repay the money lost by his investors. Under federal law, Ponzi would be eligible for parole after 20 months, one-third of his sentence.
- W.C. Durant resigned as President of General Motors, 10 days after his large share of stock in GM was purchased by a consortium led by Pierre S. DuPont. DuPont was then made President of GM.
- The U.S. Navy Board of Inquiry delivered its final report on alleged Navy killings in Haiti, and determined that 1,142 Haitians had died in 298 separate skirmishes with U.S. forces.
- A "war for supremacy in the control of golf in America" was announced by the Western Golf Association, which announced that at its meeting on January 15, it would change its name to the American Golf Association and then challenge the United States Golf Association (USGA). Under an unwritten agreement between the WGA and the USGA, the USGA had 400 member clubs from coast to coast, while the WGA had limited its membership "to clubs west of a line just east of Pittsburgh, Buffalo and Atlanta".
- Born: Virginia Mayo, American film actress and dancer; as Virginia Clara Jones, in St. Louis (d. 2005)
