= Marcel Héraud =

French lawyer and politician

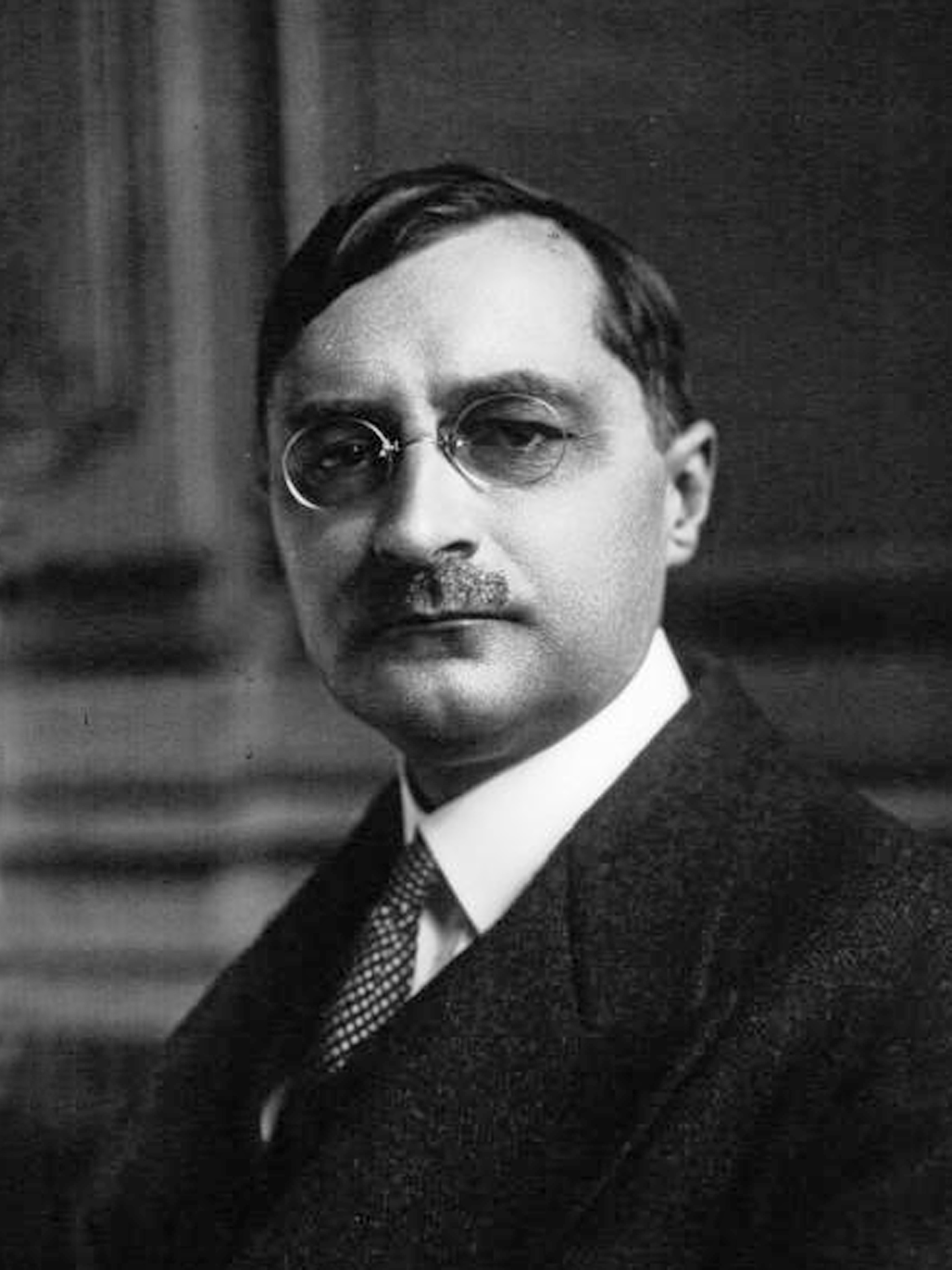
- Marcel Heraud, under-secretary to the President of the Council, 1929

Minister of Health
- In office 21 March 1940 – 5 June 1940
- Prime Minister: Paul Reynaud
- Preceded by: Marc Rucart
- Succeeded by: Georges Pernot

Personal details
- Born: 5 May 1883 Cérilly, Allier, France
- Died: 17 September 1960 (aged 77) Paris, France
- Occupation: Lawyer

Marcel Héraud (5 May 1883 – 17 September 1960) was a French lawyer and politician who was briefly Minister of Health in 1940.

== Early years (1883–1924) ==
Marcel Héraud was born on 5 May 1883 in Cérilly, Allier. His parents were Adrien Héraud, a doctor and consultant at the thermal baths of Luxeuil-les-Bains, and Alice Delarue. Marcel Héraud attended the Collège Stanislas de Paris for his secondary education, then entered the Faculty of Law of Paris and the School of Political Sciences (Ecole des sciences politiques). He obtained a degree in law and began a career as a trainee advocate in 1908. He married Lucie Félix-Bouvier on 2 December 1909. They would have one daughter. In 1912 he was admitted to the bar of the Paris Court of Appeal. In 1912 he was awarded the Prix Laval.

During World War I (1914–18) Héraud enlisted as a volunteer on 2 August 1914. He was a sergeant of the 2nd mixed regiment of zouaves and riflemen in 1916 when he was wounded before the fort of Douaumont. He was demobilized in 1917. Héraud was made a Commander of the Legion of Honour and was awarded the Military Medal (Médaille militaire) and the 1914–18 War Cross (Croix de guerre 1914–1918).

Héraud was elected municipal councilor in the 6th arrondissement of Paris, Saint-Germain-des-Prés, in 1919. In 1920 he was elected councilor-general of the Seine department. He was mainly concerned with financial questions and services such as transport and electricity. He participated in the Federal Union of French Associations of the Wounded (Union fédérale des associations françaises de mutilés). In 1923 he was vice-president of the municipal council of Paris.

He was elected president of FIDAC (The Interallied Federation of War Veterans Organisations) between 1926 and 1927.

== Deputy (1924–1940) ==
On 11 May 1924 Héraud was elected deputy for the 3rd district of the Seine in the first round of voting, on the Democratic Republican Union (Union républicaine démocratique) list. He sat in the chamber with the Democratic Republic Left (Gauche républicaine démocratique). He was reelected on 22 April 1928 in the first round. During his long parliamentary career Héraud was active in various parliamentary committees, and was particularly involved in the committee on Foreign Affairs. He made proposals on various subjects, but his main interest was in legal topics such as the civil code, penal code, code of criminal procedure and so on.

Héraud was under-secretary of state to the President of the Council from 3 November 1929 to 21 February 1930, and from 2 March 1930 to 13 December 1930. He became a member of the Croix-de-Feu veterans' organization, probably mainly to win votes in the 1932 elections. Héraud was reelected on 8 May 1932 in the second round, and sat in the chamber with the Republican Center. He was reelected on 3 May 1936 in the second round, and sat with the group of Independent Republicans. He was Minister of Public Health from 21 March 1940 to 5 June 1940 in the cabinet of Paul Reynaud. On 10 July 1940, he voted in favour of granting the cabinet presided by Marchal Philippe Pétain authority to draw up a new constitution, thereby effectively ending the French Third Republic and establishing Vichy France.

== Later career (1940–60) ==
Héraud retired from politics after the vote of 10 July 1940. He returned to the Paris bar, where he was mainly involved in civil cases, but pleaded several high-profile criminal cases. He joined the Council of the Order of Advocates (Conseil de l'Ordre des avocats) in 1945. He was Bâtonnier of the Order from 1953 to 1955. He defended the collaborationist Jacques Benoist-Méchin in the high court, and obtained the acquittal of Paul Creyssel, the former deputy of the Seine. He also participated in the notorious trial of Gaston Dominici. Marcel Héraud died in his home in Paris on 17 September 1960 at the age of 77.

== Publications ==
- Héraud, Marcel (1921). Répertoire pratique et alphabétique de toutes les questions juridiques intéressant les commissaires-priseurs et autres officiers ministériels chargés des prisées et ventes aux enchères d'objets mobiliers et marchandises (in French). Paris: Rousseau. p. 488.
- Constant, Charles; Héraud, Marcel; Gaultier, Jean (1927). Manuel pratique des commissaires-priseurs et autres officiers vendeurs de meubles, contenant le texte annoté et les commentaires des lois, décrets, arrêtés, ordonnances concernant l'exercice de leur profession, par Charles Constant, avocat à la Cour d'appel. 3e édition entièrement refondue et mise au courant de la législation et de la jurisprudence, par Marcel Héraud et Jean Gaultier, avocats à la Cour d'appel (in French). Saint-Dizier (Haute-Marne): Impr. des établissements André Brulliard. p. 707.
- Łukasiewicz, Juliusz; Bibié, Maxence; Héraud, Marcel; Berthod, Aimé; Delbos, Yvon (1937). Manifestation en l'honneur de l'alliance et de l'amitié franco-polonaise, 4 février 1937. [Allocutions de MM. Maxence Bibié, Marcel Héraud, Aimé Berthod, Juljusz Lukasiewicz et Yvon Delbos.] (in French). Bordeaux: Imprimerie centrale. p. 28.
- Ribet, Maurice; Poignard, Marcel; Roger, Marcel; Héraud, Marcel (1948). Pierre Masse: Note de Maurice Ribet. Floch. p. 61.
- Héraud, Marcel (1949). La Petite Beauce de Beaugency. p. 46.

== Sources ==
- Collectif (2001). "Heraud (Marcel)". Dictionnaire des parlementaires français de 1940 à 1958 (in French). Vol. 4. E-K. Paris: La Documentation française.
- Jolly, Jean (1960–1977). "Heraud (Marcel)". Dictionnaire des parlementaires français; notices biographiques sur les ministres, députés et sénateurs français de 1889 à 1940 (in French). Vol. VI. Paris: Presses universitaires de France. ISBN 2-1100-1998-0.
- Kéchichian, Albert (2006). Les Croix-de-feu à l'âge des fascismes: travail, famille, patrie. Editions Champ Vallon. ISBN 978-2-87673-450-0.
- Schweitz, Arlette (2001). "HERAUD Marcel dit MARCEL-HERAUD". Les parlementaires de la Seine sous la Troisième République: Etudes (in French). Publications de la Sorbonne. ISBN 978-2-85944-432-7.
