= October 1920 =

Month of 1920

<<	October 1920					>>
Su	Mo	Tu	We	Th	Fr	Sa
					1	2
3	4	5	6	7	8	9
10	11	12	13	14	15	16
17	18	19	20	21	22	23
24	25	26	27	28	29	30
31

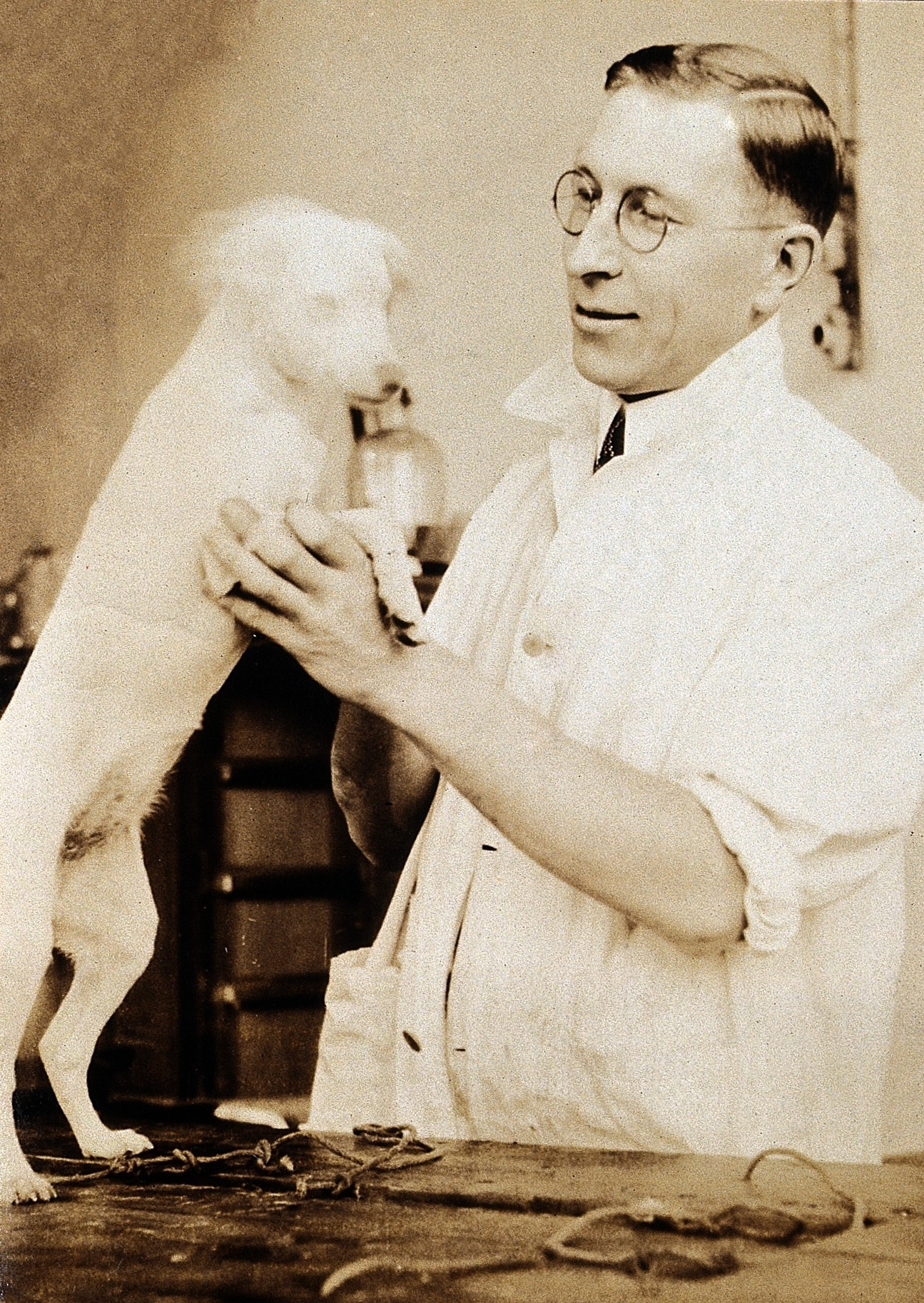
October 31, 1920: Dr. Frederick Banting reaches the insight that leads to the discovery of insulin

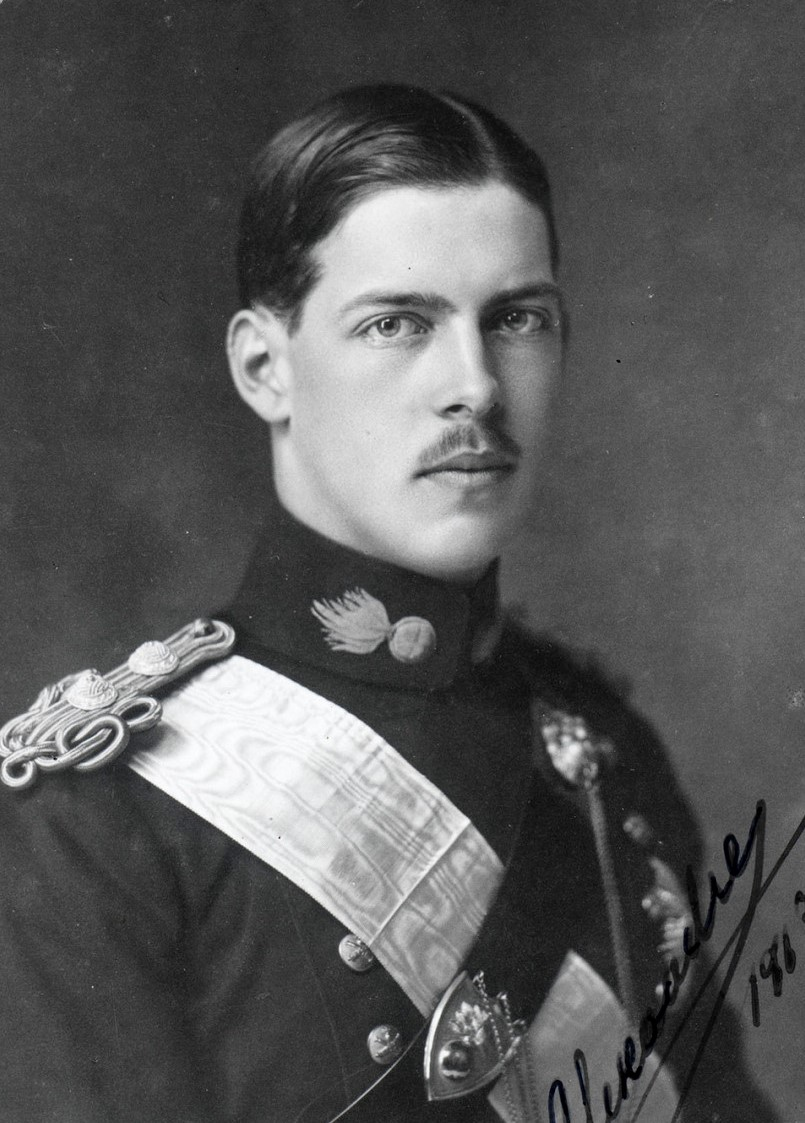
October 2, 1920: King Alexander of Greece fatally injured by a monkey, dies October 25

The following events occurred in October 1920:

== October 1, 1920 (Friday) ==
- The 1920 Chilean presidential election was finally settled when the South American nation's Supreme Court ruled, 5 to 2, that Arturo Allesandri had been elected over Luis Barros Borgono by 177 electoral votes to 176. On October 4, a joint session of the National Congress proclaimed the election.
- Charles Ponzi was indicted on 86 counts of mail fraud.
- For the first time in decades, New York City residents were not required to change their dwellings for "Moving Day," and more than 90 percent of families elected to stay at their homes. On October 1, 1919, an estimated 75,000 New York families moved from one apartment to another as their leases expired; in 1920 it was only 5,000.
- Born:
  - Walter Matthau, American actor, Oscar Award and Tony Award winner; as Walter Matthow, in New York City (d. 2000)
  - Charles Daudelin, Canadian sculptor; in Granby, Quebec (d. 2001)

== October 2, 1920 (Saturday) ==
- King Alexander of Greece was injured by a monkey while walking through the grounds of the Tatoi Palace and developed a fatal infection as a result. The King was walking with his dog, Fritz, when a Barbary macaque came through and the two animals fought. While trying to rescue his dog, King Alexander suffered a deep bite from a second macaque. The wound became infected, and Alexander died of sepsis on October 25. Noting the disaster that followed when Alexander's death brought former King Constantine back to the throne, and the new government's disastrous war with Turkey, Winston Churchill would later write, "It is perhaps no exaggeration to remark that a quarter of a million persons died of this monkey's bite."
- Lord Curzon, the British Foreign Secretary, sent a warning to Soviet Foreign Minister Georgy Chicherin that Soviet submarines were seen in the Baltic Sea, and that the Royal Navy would attack Russian subs on sight.
- King Alfonso of Spain dissolved the Cortes, Spain's parliament, at the request of Prime Minister Dato because Dato's government did not have a majority.
- With two games left to play in the season, the Cleveland Indians clinched the American League pennant with a 10-1 win over the Detroit Tigers, guaranteeing that they would finish at least one game ahead of the Chicago White Sox, who had recently lost several of their star players to the Black Sox Scandal.
- The last tripleheader in major league baseball, with teams playing three nine-inning games on the same day, took place in Pittsburgh, as the Reds defeated the Pirates 13-4 and 7-3 in the first two games, and the Pirates won 6-0 in the final meeting of the day. With the victory, the Reds captured third place in the National League pennant race. The Friday game between the teams had been rained out, and, since the game would determine third place in the NL, the owners agreed to play it on the same day as Saturday's scheduled doubleheader, starting at noon rather than 2 o'clock.
- Born: Tun Tin, Burmese politician, Prime Minister of Burma; in Myitkyina, Burma Province, British Raj (present-day Myanmar) (d. 2020)
- Died:
  - Max Bruch, 82, German romantic classical composer (b. 1838)
  - William Young, 73, American author and playwright, best known for the adaptation of Ben-Hur (b. 1847)
  - Winthrop M. Crane, 67, American politician, 40th governor of Massachusetts from 1900 to 1903, U.S. Senator for Massachusetts from 1904 to 1913 (b. 1853)

== October 3, 1920 (Sunday) ==
- The first games between NFL teams were played in the National Football League, called at the time the American Professional Football Association, between league members. At Dayton, Ohio, the Dayton Triangles hosted the Columbus Pan Handles at 2:30 in the afternoon. The Triangles won, 14 to 0, with Lou Partlow rushing for the first touchdown after halftime. In Rock Island, Illinois, the Rock Island Independents defeated the Muncie Flyers of Indiana, 45 to 0. Pudge Wyman made the first score within three minutes after kickoff by returning a blocked punt.
- The Prix de l'Arc de Triomphe, now the premier thoroughbred horse race in France, was inaugurated at Longchamp Racecourse at Paris, to be run annually on the first Sunday in October. Comrade, ridden by Frank Bullock, won the prize of 150,000 francs for the 2.4 kilometres (1.5 mi), a length ahead of King's Cross, and Plerus showing at third.
- Diego Manuel Chamorro, the uncle of the incumbent President of Nicaragua, Emiliano Chamorro Vargas, was elected president in balloting tainted by fraud. He succeeded his nephew on January 1.

== October 4, 1920 (Monday) ==
- A fire broke out on the world's biggest ocean liner, the German steamer SS Bismarck, severely damaging it while it was still under construction at the Hamburg shipyard. The ship had been launched in 1914 for the Hamburg America Line, but its completion was delayed by the First World War. Under the Treaty of Versailles, it was required to be turned over to British control as part of Germany's war reparations, and would be commissioned in 1922 as RMS Majestic.
- The Mannerheim League for Child Welfare, a Finnish non-governmental organization, was founded on the initiative of Sophie Mannerheim.
- Born: Charles Burrell, called "the Jackie Robinson of Classical Music;" for being the first African American to become a member of a major symphony orchestra, in Toledo, Ohio (d. 2025)

== October 5, 1920 (Tuesday) ==
- At Riga in Latvia, Soviet Russia signed an armistice with Poland, with both sides agreeing to a ceasefire in the Polish–Soviet War to take effect on March 7.
- A mob of 50 men in Macclenny, Florida, went to the Baker County Jail, overpowered the county sheriff, and then removed three African American men who had been arrested on charges of complicity in the October 3 killing of a white farmer, John Harvey. Rayfield Gibbons, Ben Givens, and Fulton Smith were taken to the outskirts of town, tied to trees and shot to death. Another black man not accused in the murder, Sam Duncan, was shot to death later in the day. Two white men suspected of participating in the lynching, Frank Conner and Frank Darley, were killed execution style near MacClenny on October 20. The county sheriff said in a statement that the two white men "were killed by unidentified white men seeking revenge for White's murder." The person believed by police to be White's killer, Jim Givens, was never brought to trial, although arrests were made of African American men in Fruitdale, Alabama and in Marianna, Florida on suspicion that Givens had been located.
- The American University in Cairo opened in Egypt with 142 students enrolling in its College of Arts and Sciences, Classes were equivalent to the last two years of high school and the first two years of University.
- The American Ship and Commerce Corporation bought a controlling interest in the Hamburg-American cruise ship line.
- Westinghouse Electric & Manufacturing Company took out an option for $335,000 for the commercial rights for Edwin Howard Armstrong's patents on the regenerative circuit and superheterodyne receiver, with an additional $200,000 to be paid if Armstrong prevailed in the regenerative patent dispute. Westinghouse exercised this option on November 4, 1920.
- Austria's Federal Constitutional Law, the Bundes-Verfassungsgesetz, was promulgated, declaring Austria to be a federal republic and creating a bicameral legislature, the Bundesversammlung which would elect the President to a four-year term. The upper house (the Bundesrat) and the lower house (the Nationalrat) both had proportional representation.
- Born:
  - Jake Gaudaur, Canadian football player, Commissioner of the Canadian Football League from 1968 to 1984; in Orillia, Ontario (d. 2007)
  - Vincent DeRosa, American jazz musician and French horn player; in Kansas City, Missouri (d. 2022)
- Died:
  - William Heinemann, 57, English publisher, founder of the Heinemann Publishing Group (b. 1863)
  - C. N. Williamson, 61, British novelist, best known for his books and stories written in collaboration with his wife Alice Muriel (A. M.) Williamson (b. 1859)

== October 6, 1920 (Wednesday) ==
- The feasibility of flying an airplane at any time of day — and of a virtually fireproof aircraft— was demonstrated with the landing, at midnight, of an airplane equipped with powerful arc lamps bright enough for the pilot to illuminate a landing site while making an approach to an airport. Because arc lighting was a fire hazard, the test also demonstrated that an aircraft could make a safe approach even while the metal was ablaze. The "fireproof" airplane touched down at Roosevelt Field at Mineola, New York, on Long Island for what the Associated Press described as "one of the most important developments in aviation since the Armistice" of two years earlier. Since the invention of the airplane in 1903, flying after dusk had been too dangerous to attempt. The invention of Parker B. Bradley, the "Bradley Day Light" would later be superseded by illumination less susceptible to causing a fire.
- On the same day, the U.S. Navy made its first public demonstration of the new magnetized Ambrose Channel pilot cable navigational aid, guiding the destroyer USS Semmes solely by instruments through the Ambrose Channel of the Narrows of New York Harbor. and introducing the first technology that would allow ships to sail into New York during heavy fog rather than to wait outside for the fog to clear (the windows of USS Semmes were blocked by heavy canvas during the trip). Although the invention raised the possibility of wireless cables to guide automobiles and other vehicles, the cable would be superseded only a few years later by wireless radio beacons.
- For the first time in eight years, a passenger train from Mexico was allowed to cross into the United States, as President-elect Álvaro Obregón traveled from Ciudad Juárez to El Paso, Texas, for a visit. After being greeted by the city mayor, General Obregon and his staff were driven to the Hotel Paso del Norte.
- Born: Pietro Consagra, Italian abstract sculptor, co-founder of the Forma group of Italian artists; in Mazara del Vallo (d. 2005)

== October 7, 1920 (Thursday) ==
- The Suwałki Agreement, ending the war between Poland and Lithuania, was signed in the Polish city of Suwałki.
- The preliminary results of the 1920 United States population census were announced as showing 105,683,108 people in the 48 states. On May 17, the Census Bureau would announce that 27,512 persons had been added in an adjustment for a population of 105,710,620 in the states and 117,859,358 when including the outlying territories.
- The Brussels Conference issued a joint report urging all nations to balance their budgets, reduce armaments, form an international credit association, and reform currencies.
- Died: Yves Delage, 66, French zoologist (b. 1854)

== October 8, 1920 (Friday) ==
Flag of the BPSR

- The Bukharan People's Soviet Republic was declared at a convention in the city of Bukhara, five weeks after the abolition of the monarchy of the old Emirate of Bukhara. Fayzulla Khodzhayev, leader of the overthrow of the Emirate, was named as the nation's de facto leader as Chairman of the Council of People's Ministers. The Republic would exist for four years before becoming part of the Uzbek SSR within the Soviet Union.
- Hermann Görner, a strength athlete in Germany, unofficially set a record for most weight lifted with one hand, still recognized 100 years later by Guinness World Records. At Leipzig, Görner picked up a bar weighing 330 kilograms (730 lb). On October 29, in official competition, he lifted 301 kilograms (664 lb).
- Twenty-three people were killed in Italy in the collision of two passenger trains near Venice.
- Born: Frank Herbert, American science-fiction author, known for Dune and its sequels, Hugo Award and Nebula Award winner; in Tacoma, Washington (d. 1986)

== October 9, 1920 (Saturday) ==
- Forty-two people in France were killed in a railroad accident, and 100 injured, when the Paris to Nantes express crashed into a freight train at the station in Houilles.
- UK Prime Minister David Lloyd George said in a speech at Carnarvon in Wales that his government would never allow Irish home rule, and that the British government would continue to fight to maintain order.
- Southern Tyrol was formally transferred from Austria to Italy.
- Vilnius, the capital of Lithuania, fell to the Army of Poland in the Polish–Lithuanian War.
- French aviator Bernard Barny de Romanet set a new speed record, reaching 292.82 kilometers per hour (181.95 mph) when he flew one kilometer in 12.3 seconds.
- The first USA national Fire Prevention Day was inaugurated by Presidential proclamation. Five years later, President Coolidge would extend the day to become an entire week. The date of October 9th was chosen because it commemorates the Great Chicago fire of 1871.
- Born:
  - Jens Bjørneboe, Norwegian author; in Kristiansand (d. 1976, suicide)
  - Yusef Lateef, American jazz musician and composer; as William Emanuel Huddleston, in Chattanooga, Tennessee (d. 2013)

== October 10, 1920 (Sunday) ==
- A plebiscite was held in the predominantly Slovenian zone of the south of Austria's Kärnten state (called "Carinthia" in the English-language press). Voters in the constituencies of Rosegg, Ferlach, Völkermarkt and Bleiburg were given a choice of becoming part of the Carinthia province of Yugoslavia, or to remain part of Austria. The voters, including a substantial number of Slovenian Austrians, elected to stay in Austria by a 59 percent to 41 percent margin.
- Bill Wambsganss of the Cleveland Indians made an unassisted triple play, one of only 15 MLB players to tag out three members of the opposing team in one at-bat, and the only player to do so in the World Series. Cleveland and the Brooklyn Robins were tied, 2 games to 2, going into Game 5. In the fifth inning, with Otto Miller on first and Pete Kilduff on second base, Brooklyn's Clarence Mitchell hit a line drive toward second base. Wambsganss caught the ball for the first out and then stepped on second base before Kilduff could return; and tagged out Miller, who was trying to run back to first base.
- Future Spanish dictator Francisco Franco took command of the first battalion of the Spanish Legion at Ceuta, one of Spain's North African outposts.
- Born: Colonel Gail Halvorsen, American military officer in the Air Force, known for dropping candy to German children during the Berlin Airlift, Congressional Gold Medal honoree; in Salt Lake City (d. 2022)
- Died: Hudson Stuck, 56, British explorer and Episcopal priest; died of pneumonia (b. 1863)

== October 11, 1920 (Monday) ==
- The Prince of Wales, who would later reign briefly as King Edward VIII, returned to London after being away for six months for his tour as Royal Ambassador throughout the British Empire. The Prince arrived, aboard HMS Renown, to an enthusiastic welcome at Portsmouth. He then traveled by train to London. The Times of London noted that "No station on the route was without its group of cheering spectators... People had come from remote villages and lonely farms to see the Prince go by."

== October 12, 1920 (Tuesday) ==
- Poland and Soviet Russia signed a preliminary peace treaty at Riga, to go into effect on October 18.

Republic of Central Lithuania

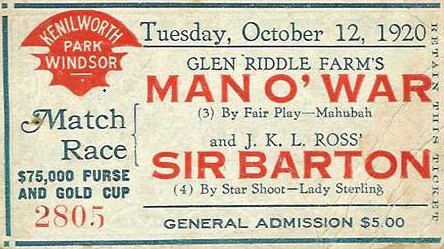

- Polish Army General Lucjan Żeligowski proclaimed the Republic of Central Lithuania within the Polish occupied zone of Lithuania, with Vilnius as the capital and himself as its leader. In 1922, the "republic" would be annexed into Poland.
- The Cleveland Indians won the 1920 World Series, at the time a best-5-of-9 competition, defeating the Brooklyn Robins, 3-0 in the seventh game to win, five games to two.
- Ground was broken for the Holland Tunnel, under the Hudson River, between New York and New Jersey. The tunnel would not be completed until November 13, 1927.
- In a two horse race between the most successful Throughbreds in North America, once-beaten Man o' War competed against 1919 Triple Crown winner Sir Barton at Kenilworth Park Racetrack in Windsor, Ontario. The prize for winning the Kenilwoth Cup was a record $75,000, with a gold trophy valued at an additional $5,000.
- Died: Isadore Dyer, 54, American physician, pioneer in the treatment of leprosy; died of angina pectoris (b. 1865)

== October 13, 1920 (Wednesday) ==
- U.S. Marines Major General George Barnett released his report on the U.S. occupation of Haiti, and revealed that 3,250 natives were killed by the Marines, some without cause.
- Love and Liquor, the first Burmese feature film, and the day it premiered, October 13, 1920, is commemorated annually as Myanmar Movie Day.
- Born:
  - Laraine Day, American film actress and leading lady; as La Raine Johnson, in Roosevelt, Utah (d. 2007)
  - D. A. Russell, British classicist and academic; as Donald Andrew Frank Moore Russel (d. 2020)

== October 14, 1920 (Thursday) ==
- The Treaty of Tartu (also called the Treaty of Dorpat) was signed between Soviet Russia and Finland at the neutral Estonian capital at Tartu as an agreement on the Russian-Finnish border.
- A proposal for a presidential debate between Republican nominee Warren G. Harding and Democratic nominee James M. Cox was rejected by Senator Harding. Governor Cox had proposed that the two appear on the same platform to discuss U.S. entry into the League of Nations. Harding's spokesman, Indiana U.S. Senator Harry S. New, replied "I would not for a moment consider a proposition so utterly absurd."
- Born: Frank Ayd, American psychiatrist, introduced antipsychotic medications to the United States, granted with the first permit to administer Thorazine for schizophrenia; in Baltimore, Maryland (d. 2008)

== October 15, 1920 (Friday) ==
- Preparing for a nationwide walkout of coal miners, the United Kingdom issued an embargo against the export of coal.
- The National Save-A-Life League, the first documented suicide prevention program in the United States, announced the highest number of reported suicides in the U.S. in one day — 115 — since it began keeping statistics in 1906. Dr. H.M. Warren described the uptick in the taking of life as "a banner day for suicides" and said that the previous high was 106 in a day.
- Born: Mario Puzo, American novelist and screenwriter, known for The Godfather; in New York City (d. 1999)
- Died: Dr. Duncan MacDougall, 54, American surgeon who claimed that his experiments showed that the human soul weighs 21 grams (0.74 oz)

== October 16, 1920 (Saturday) ==
- Great Britain's 1,000,000 unionized coal miners went on strike at the end of the day to seek higher wages and better working conditions.
- In emergency preparation for a strike of coal miners, Great Britain restricted city lighting, put rations on coal, food and sugar, and halted the export of British coal.
- The city of Montebello, California, formerly Newmark, was incorporated as a suburb of Los Angeles.

== October 17, 1920 (Sunday) ==
- In voting for Austria's National Assembly, the Christian Socialist Party increased its majority, gaining 82 seats, while the Social Democrats were reduced to 66 and the German Nationalists to 20. Chancellor Michael Mayr formed a cabinet almost exclusively of Christian Socialists. The Social Democrats went into opposition and never returned to the government during the First Republic.
- Germany ordered the expulsion of the two Russian delegates to the Halle conference, Grigory Zinoviev and Solomon Lozovsky.
- The Chicago American Giants won the first unofficial championship of Negro league baseball, 5 games to 3, against the Bacharach Giants of Atlantic City, New Jersey, in a doubleheader at Ebbets Field in Brooklyn. Chicago was the pennant winner of the new Midwest-based Negro National League and Bacharach was the best African-American team in the East. In the first game, Bacharach pitcher Dick "Cannonball" Redding pitched a no-hitter for eight innings in which neither team could score, before Elwood "Bingo" DeMoss and Cristóbal Torriente scored in the ninth for a 2 to 0 Chicago win. In the second game, DeMoss scored in the fourth inning following a triple and Chicago was leading, 1 to 0 after six innings when the game was called at dusk. Chicago had also beat Bacharach in Philadelphia on October 7, while Bacharach had won both games against Chicago in Brooklyn on October 10 (5-3 and 7-3).
- Born:
  - Montgomery Clift, American film actor; as Edward Montgomery Clift, in Omaha, Nebraska (d. 1966)
  - Miguel Delibes, Spanish novelist and journalist; in Valladolid (d. 2010)
- Died:
  - John Reed, 32, American journalist and communist activist, best known for authoring Ten Days That Shook the World; died of typhus (b. 1887)
  - Michael Fitzgerald, 38, Irish militant and Republican; became the first of 11 imprisoned IRA members to die from a hunger strike (b. 1881)

== October 18, 1920 (Monday) ==
- The Gujarat Vidyapith, the first and only university established by the Mahatma Gandhi during his lifetime, was opened in the Paldi section of the city of Ahmedabad in present-day Gujarat state.
- The army transport USS Pocahontas brought the remains of 2,185 American soldiers from France, almost two years after the end of World War One.
- Thousands of unemployed British men and women staged an angry march toward Prime Minister David Lloyd George's residence on Downing Street in London and were forcibly dispersed by patrolmen and mounted police, who confronted them at Whitehall Street and at Richmond Terrace. The police on horseback "were compelled to draw their swordsticks and ride into the surging throng," a dispatch from London reported, "a part of which stampeded into adjacent side streets, breaking down fences and iron railings." Roughly 50 protesters were hurt, and 20 of them were sent to hospitals.
- The new Hungarian Parliament, the Országgyűlés, opened its 1920-1921 session but adjourned early because of a violent debate between legislators who supported the restoration of the House of Habsburg-Lorraine that had ruled Austria-Hungary until the end of the First World War, and those who wanted a nationwide referendum to select a King.
- The owners of three American League baseball teams—the New York Yankees, Chicago White Sox and Boston Red Sox— signed a contract with the eight National League teams to withdraw from the National Agreement of 1903 and to form (if another American League team could be added) a 12-team league for the 1921 season. Under the agreement, the Yankees, White Sox and Red Sox would become National League teams if Major League Baseball could not be restructured with a powerful Commissioner by November 1.

== October 19, 1920 (Tuesday) ==
- The British schooner General Morne departed from Lisbon, intending to travel from Portugal to Canada, and was not heard from again. Over the next nine months, as noted by The New York Times the following June, eight more ships would disappear in the Atlantic Ocean.
- Italy's Minister of Agriculture, Giuseppe Micheli, issued a land reform decree, providing that landowners would be required to rent directly to their peasant sharecroppers or to make a contract directly with peasant cooperative associations rather than middlemen. The reform came after a peasant uprising on the island of Sicily.
- Born:
  - Pandurang Shastri Athavale, Indian spiritual leader, founder of the Swadhyaya Movement; in Roha, Bombay Presidency, British Raj (now Maharashtra state in India) (d. 2003)
  - LaWanda Page (stage name for Alberta Peal), African American comedienne and TV actress known for portraying "Aunt Esther" on Sanford and Son; in St. Louis (d. 2002)
  - Robert Hugo Dunlap, American military officer, Medal of Honor recipient; in Abingdon, Illinois (d. 2000)

== October 20, 1920 (Wednesday) ==
- Yugoslavia's ministerial council voted to declare the Kingdom of the Serbs, Croats and Slovenes a constitutional monarchy, with the Karageorgeovich dynasty of Serbia to be the reigning family.
- British Columbia became the first Canadian province to reject national prohibition and to approve the sale of liquor. A majority of more than 25,000 voters opted for the sale of alcohol under regulation by the provincial government. Five days later, Alberta, Saskatchewan, Manitoba and Nova Scotia all voted in favor of prohibition.
- In London, the House of Commons defeated the motion by Arthur Henderson for a censure of British policy toward Ireland, with only 79 in favor and 346 against.
- The Broadway comedy The First Year, written by Frank Craven and directed by Winchell Smith premiered for the first of 729 performances.
- The organization Job's Daughters International, for young women 10 to 20 years of age, was founded as The Order of Job's Daughters by Ethel T. Wead Mick in Omaha, Nebraska, on October 20, 1920.
- Born:
  - Janet Jagan, American-born Guyanese politician, president of Guyana from 1997 to 1999, Prime Minister of Guyana in 1997; as Janet Rosenberg, in Chicago (d. 2009)
  - Siddhartha Shankar Ray, Indian diplomat and politician; in Calcutta (now [[Kolkata[]]), Bengal Presidency, British India (now West Bengal state) (d. 2010)

== October 21, 1920 (Thursday) ==
- Alan Arnold Griffith, the discoverer of the principles behind metal fatigue, announced his findings with the publication of his paper "The Phenomena of Rupture and Flow in Solids."

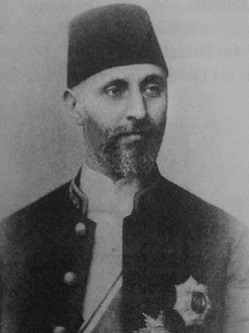
Ahmet Tevfik Pasha

- Ahmet Tevfik Pasha formed a government as the final Grand Vizier of the Ottoman Empire, following the October 17 resignation of Damat Ferid Pasha. Tevfik Pasha would serve until November 4, 1922, resigning three days after the vote of the Grand National Assembly of Turkey in favor of the abolition of the Ottoman sultanate.
- Died: Zebulon Brockway, 93, American prison reformer (b. 1827)

== October 22, 1920 (Friday) ==
- The Scholastic Corporation, founded by journalist Maurice R. Robinson in Pittsburgh and now one of the world's leading publishers of popular educational magazines and books for children and teenagers, introduced its first publication, The Western Pennsylvania Scholastic, a four-page newspaper that "provided articles on topics of general interest to students" and sold for five cents a copy. On September 16, 1922, Robinson would introduce Scholastic magazine nationwide as a biweekly publication for high school students and then expand its media offerings to books, book clubs, recordings, television shows and films.
- A group of 34 Dutch sailors was rescued from a deserted island in the Philippines after having been run aground September 30 by a typhoon in the Visayan group of islets. A Philippine constabulary patrol located the men, who had run out of food, and brought them to Manila to the Netherlands consulate.
- Born: Timothy Leary, American psychologist and counterculture drug activist during the 1960s; in Springfield, Massachusetts (d. 1996)

== October 23, 1920 (Saturday) ==
- The Sinclair Lewis novel Main Street was first released by Harcourt, Brace and Howe. In this novel, Lewis shattered one of the most sacred American myths, that of the friendly village. Main Street quickly became the center of a national debate.
- Born:
  - Tetsuya "Ted" Fujita, Japanese-born American meteorologist best known for creating the Fujita scale to measure tornado intensity and damage; in Sone-maru, Fukuoka Prefecture (now part of Kitakyushu) (d.1998)
  - Gianni Rodari, Italian children's author; in Omegna (d. 1980)
  - Vern Stephens, American major league baseball player, three-time home run champion and RBI champion in the American League; in McAlister, New Mexico (d. 1968)

== October 24, 1920 (Sunday) ==
- Agatha Christie's first Hercule Poirot mystery novel, The Mysterious Affair at Styles, was released by John Lane Company in New York, with the byline "A very ingenious detective story, introducing a new type of detective in the shape of a Belgian." Poirot would be the subject of 33 novels, two plays and over 50 short stories before the character was killed off in Christie's final novel, Curtain, in 1975.
- A law went into effect in the Netherlands setting the maximum work week at 45 hours, with five 8-hour days, five hours on Saturday, and no work at all on Sunday.
- Born:
  - Donald Seldin, American nephrologist; in New York City (d. 2018)
  - Jackie Gaughan, American casino operator and Las Vegas real estate developer; in Hastings, Nebraska (d. 2014)
- Died: Muhammed Sharif al-Faruqi, 29, Islamic activist, played a pivotal role in the Arab Revolt against the Ottoman Empire during World War I; died after he was attacked by bandits (b. 1891)

== October 25, 1920 (Monday) ==
- A referendum on the prohibition of alcohol sales and import was carried out in four of Canada's then nine provinces. The three prairie provinces (Alberta, Saskatchewan and Manitoba) and the maritime province of Nova Scotia all voted to continue the Canada Temperance Act. Five days earlier, British Columbia had voted to allow government-regulated sale of liquor, and New Brunswick had approved prohibition on July 10.
- Terence MacSwiney, the jailed Mayor of Cork, died of starvation on the 74th day of his hunger strike.
- King Alexander of Greece died of blood poisoning caused by a bite from a monkey. In a plebiscite that followed, Greek voters overwhelmingly favored restoring Alexander's father, King Constantine I, to the throne. King Constantine had abdicated the throne in 1917 under pressure from the victorious Allies of World War I (Britain, France and Italy) and upon his return, ended their financial support of Greece.
- Representatives of Italy and the Senussi Order of Libya signed the Accord of al-Rajma in Rome, with Italy recognizing Sultan Sayyid Muhammad Idris of Cyrenaica as the ruler of the oases of Jaghbub, Awjila, Jalu, and Kufra. King Idris would rule Libya from 1951 until being deposed in 1969 by Colonel Muammar Gaddafi.
- The Story of Doctor Dolittle, a children's novel by Hugh Lofting, was released by the Frederick A. Stokes publishing company as the first in Lofting's series of books about the Welsh physician who could talk to animals.
- Born: J. Denis Summers-Smith, Scottish ornithologist and mechanical engineer; as James Denis Summers-Smith, in Glasgow (d. 2020)
- Died:
  - Louis Nail, French politician and Minister of Justice from 1917 to 1920; died after being struck by an automobile
  - Rush Hawkins, 89, American politician, Civil War veteran and book collector; died after being struck by an automobile (b. 1831)

== October 26, 1920 (Tuesday) ==
- Six days before the U.S. presidential election, Republican candidate Warren G. Harding was accused by U.S. Secretary of State Bainbridge Colby of using an intermediary to negotiate an oil concession with Soviet Communist leader Vladimir Lenin. According to Colby, the U.S. envoy to Latvia, Evan Young, had been told that American financier Washington Vanderlip was representing Senator Harding in trying to obtain an exclusive 60-year concession to coal and oil rights in northern Siberia in return for U.S. diplomatic recognition of the Soviet government. Harding, who would win the election on November 2, denied having even heard of Vanderlip and the charge was never investigated.
- Born:
  - Sarah Lee Lippincott, American astronomer, pioneer of astrometry; in Philadelphia (d. 2019)
  - Robert D. Maxwell, American combat soldier, Medal of Honor recipient; in Boise, Idaho (d. 2019)

== October 27, 1920 (Wednesday) ==
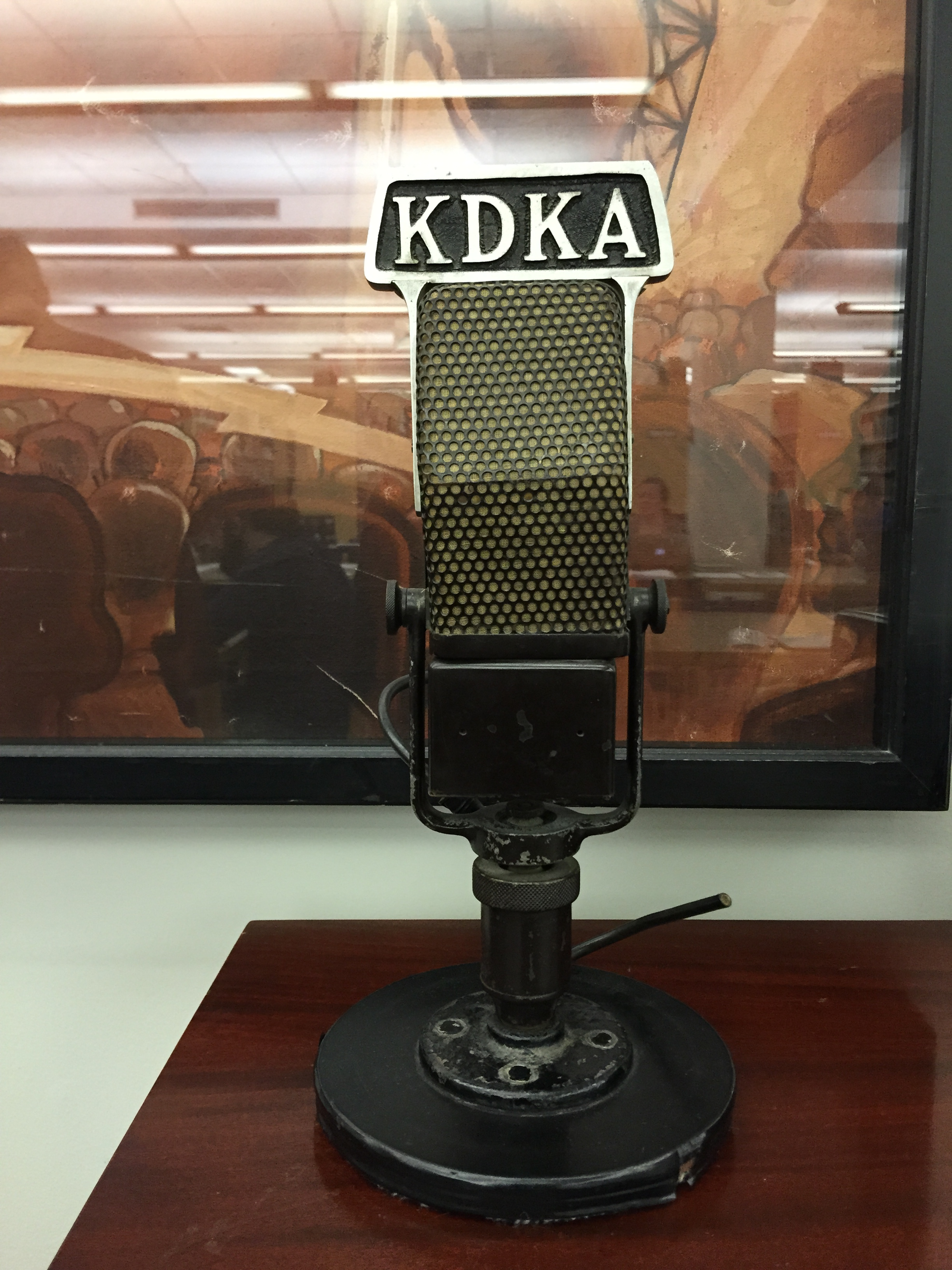

- KDKA (AM) of Pittsburgh, owned by the Westinghouse Electric Corporation, was awarded the license that it would use to become the first commercial radio broadcasting station in the United States. Under the license of the U.S. Department of Commerce's Bureau of Navigation, KDKA was initially authorized to transmit "point-to-point" to navigation stations in four states, rather than to broadcast its signal generally, but would use the license on November 2 to broadcast election returns that could be heard on all radio receivers in the area on the 550 kHz AM radio frequency.
- The League of Nations voted to move its permanent headquarters from Paris to Geneva.
- Born: Nanette Fabray, American actress, Tony Award and Emmy Award winner; as Ruby Nanette Fabares, in San Diego (d. 2018)
- Died: Morris Woodruff Seymour, 77, American historian, judge and attorney (b. 1843)

== October 28, 1920 (Thursday) ==
- The British coal miners strike was settled, with the men getting an extra two shillings per day for base pay and bonuses on a sliding scale based on output.
- Greece's Chamber of Deputies proclaimed Prince Paul, the 18-year old brother of the late King Alexander, as the new King of Greece. Paul declared that he would not accept the throne unless it was clear that the Greek people wished to reject more suitable candidates. "The throne does not belong to me," he said, but belongs to my august father, King Constantine, and my oldest brother, Prince George is constitutionally his successor. Neither of them has ever renounced his rights, but both were obliged to leave Greece in obedience to their supreme patriotic duty." Until Prince Paul could return to Greece from his self-imposed exile in Switzerland, Admiral Pavlos Kountouriotis, the Minister of the Navy, was approved by the Chamber as the Regent for King Paul, by a vote of 137 to 3.
- The Allied Powers of World War One— Britain, France, Italy and Japan— signed the Bessarabian Protocol, a treaty with Romania giving it authority over Bessarabia. Following World War II, the Romanian province was made a part of the Moldavian Soviet Socialist Republic within the U.S.S.R. and is now part of the Republic of Moldova.
- Died: Victor E. Marsden, 54, British author, credited with translating the Russian anti-Semitic publication The Protocols of the Elders of Zion into the widely read English-language version

== October 29, 1920 (Friday) ==
- The steamer SS Cape Fear, carrying a load of concrete, sank in Narragansett Bay at Rhode Island after moving into the path of another freighter, SS City of Atlanta. Cape Fear sank only three minutes later, going bow first into waters 125 fathoms 750 feet (230 m) deep and taking 17 of its 34 crew with it.
- Born:
  - Baruj Benacerraf, Venezuelan physician and immunologist, 1980 Nobel Prize laureate for co-discovery of the major histocompatibility complex (MHC) genes; in Caracas (d. 2011)
  - Hilda Bernard, Argentine radio and television actress; in Puerto Deseado (d. 2022)
  - Feliciano "Flash" Tavares, American rhythm and blues singer, organized the Grammy-award winning band Tavares; in Providence, Rhode Island (d. 2008)

== October 30, 1920 (Saturday) ==
- With the placement of an advertisement in Pathfinder magazine, Harry Scherman and three partners began the mail order book-selling business that would lead to the 1926 founding of the Book of the Month Club. Originally, Scherman marketed "The Little Leather Library," an inexpensive ($2.98) set of 30 leather bound classic books, until conceiving the idea of selling new books in the same way.
- The city of Kars, turned over from the Ottoman Empire to Armenia only two months earlier in the Treaty of Sievres, was recaptured by the Turkish Army without resistance, and has been a part of Turkey ever since.
- Aligarh Muslim University or National Muslim University was inaugurated in a ceremony at Aligarh in what is now the Uttar Pradesh state of India as Milliyya Islamiyya.
- The Communist Party of Australia was founded in Sydney, with W. P. Earsman as its first General Secretary.
- The U.S. concrete ship SS Cape Fear sank along with 20 of its crew after colliding with the ship City of Atlanta off of the coast of Providence, Rhode Island.

== October 31, 1920 (Sunday) ==
- Canadian surgeon Frederick Banting woke up at 2:00 in the morning in London, Ontario, and made note of his insight that would lead to the discovery of insulin as a treatment for diabetes. The evening before, Dr. Banting had read an article in the journal Surgery, Gynecology and Obstetrics, titled "The relation of the islets of Langerhans to Diabetes with special reference to cases of Pancreatic Lithiasis." He wrote in his journal "Diabetus [sic] Ligate pancreatic ducts of dog. Keep dogs alive till acini degenerate leaving Islets. Try to isolate the internal secretion to relieve glycosurea." Later in the day, he called a colleague to explain his idea— that the way to isolate the theorized (but undiscovered) hormone within the pancreas that controlled blood sugar level would be to let the acinar cells secreted from the pancreas to wither, leaving the insulin. Fourteen months later, on January 11, 1922, Banting and his assistant Charles Best, would make the first human test of the extract.
- The death of Terence MacSwiney was mourned worldwide and thousands of his supporters lined the streets of Cork to see the funeral procession for their mayor, who had died from a hunger strike.
- Born:
  - Dick Francis, Welsh crime fiction novelist and former horse racing jockey; in Lawrenny, Wales (d. 2010)
  - Fritz Walter, German football midfielder, member of the German and West German national football teams; as Friedrich Walter, in Kaiserslautern (d. 2002)
  - Dedan Kimathi, Kenyan nationalist and Mau Mau rebellion leader; as Kimathi wa Waciuri, in Thege village, British Kenya (d. 1957, executed)
- Died: Count Primo Magri, 71, Italian-born diminutive (2'8") American actor (b. 1849)
