= FIDAC =

Former organization of war veterans

- Established: 28 November 1920
- Founded at: Paris, France
- Dissolved: 1940
- Headquarters: Paris, France

FIDAC (French: Fédération Interalliée Des Anciens Combattants, English: The Interallied Federation of War Veterans Organisations) was established in Paris in November 1920, at the initiative of the veterans from World War I predominant pacifists, such as Hubert Aubert, director in UNC (National Combatants' Union), France, and in particular Charles Bertrand, Secretary-General of UNC and deputy in the French Parliament. They had the idea of uniting veterans’ associations established after the end of World War I in various allied countries into an international federation whose main purpose was to promote peace, continuously strengthen the brotherhood initiated on the battlefield, and provide help to the wounded, the disabled, widowers, war orphans, veterans, and also commemorate the heroes fallen in battles. Charles Bertrand, general secretary and future president of UNC in France, thus became the first president of FIDAC (1920–1924).

== History ==
At the founding meeting on 28 November 1920, FIDAC was joined by associations of veterans from France (6 associations, including UNC and UF), United Kingdom (British Empire Service League and then British Legion), US (American Legion), Belgium (FNC), Romania (National Union of Former Combatants), Czechoslovakia (Druzina Association), Italy and Serbia. Later FIDAC was joined by veteran associations from Poland (in 1923) and Portugal (in 1927).

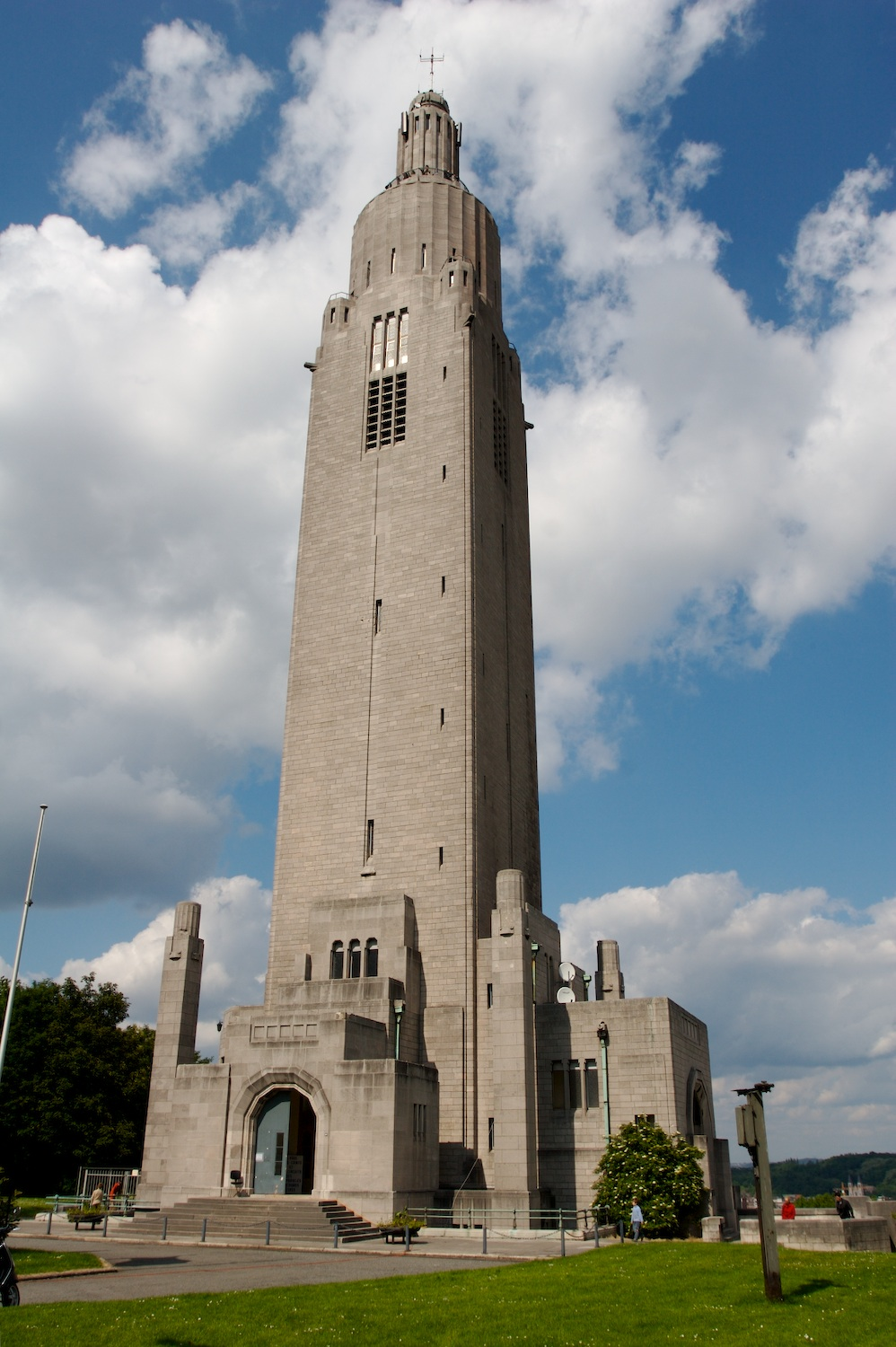
The Interallied Memorial Tower – Cointe Hill, Liège, Belgium

FIDAC was founded on the principle of political and religious neutrality and forbid associations from former enemy countries to join. Subsequently, there were proposals for the federation to include the organizations of former combatants from Germany, Austria, Bulgaria and other former enemy countries. Proposals were rejected as this would have meant not only changing the constitution, but also the name of FIDAC, which had already become a symbol of unity. Instead, the decision was made to establish annual contacts with the war veterans' associations in the former enemy countries to discuss global peace issues and to create a permanent committee (CIP – French: Comité International Permanent), representing FIDAC and other organizations like CIAMAC (French: Conférence Internationale des Associations des Mutilés de guerre et Anciens Combattants) responsible with making the necessary arrangements to enable these contacts.

Active between 1920 and 1940, this federation included a women's branch ("FIDAC Women's Auxiliary") in 1925, which promoted correspondence and student exchange programs between allied countries. The first president of FIDAC Women's Auxiliary since its inception in 1925 was Augusta Spencer-Churchill (Warburton) of the United Kingdom, known as Lady Edward Spencer-Churchill (after the name of her husband, Lord Edward Spencer-Churchill). Some other personalities of that time succeeded her at presidency of the Women's Auxiliary: in 1928 Adalin Wright Macauley (USA), in 1929 Princess Cantacuzino (Alexandrina Cantacuzino) from Romania, then Princess Marie-Louise de Merode of Belgium, known as Princess Jean de Merode (after her husband's name), Mrs. Joseph H. Thomson (USA) (1936–1937) and others. Princess Cantacuzino (Alexandrina Cantacuzino), who initiated and promoted mutual student exchanges aiming to educate youth in the spirit of pacifism (program eventually adopted at the FIDAC Congress in 1929), was re-elected president of FIDAC Women's Auxiliary in 1938.

After its foundation, FIDAC organized its first congress in Paris in 1921, where it launched the idea of raising a memorial to celebrate the allied forces. At their congress in Rome in 1925, Cointe Hill in Liège, Belgium was chosen as the site of this memorial. The construction began in 1928 and was completed in 1937. The Memorial included the Sacré-Cœur Church (Basilica of the Sacred Heart of Jesus) as a religious building and a tower as a civil memorial. The civil memorial contained numerous monuments offered by the allied nations: France, Italy, United Kingdom, Romania, Greece, Poland, Russia and Spain. These monuments were located both outside (on the esplanade) and inside the votive tower.

== The FIDAC Congresses ==
The FIDAC congresses held between 1920 and 1938 were:

- 1921 – Paris (France)
- 1922 – New Orleans (USA)
- 1923 – Brussels (Belgium)
- 1924 – London (United Kingdom)
- 1925 – Rome (Italy)

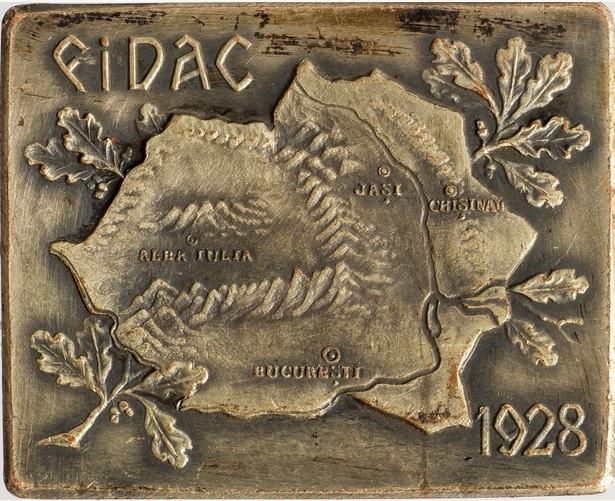
Commemorative plaque launched at FIDAC 1928 Bucharest Congress

- 1926 – Warsaw (Poland)
- 1927 – London (United Kingdom)
- 1928 – Bucharest (Romania)
- 1929 – Belgrade (Yugoslavia)
- 1930 – Washington (USA)
- 1931 – Prague (Czechoslovakia)
- 1932 – Lisbon (Portugal)
- 1933 – Casablanca / Rabat (Morocco)
- 1934 – London (United Kingdom)
- 1935 – Brussels (Belgium)
- 1936 – Warsaw (Poland)
- 1937 – Paris (France)
- 1938 – Bucharest (Romania) (25 Sep – 2 October 1938)

The outbreak of the World War II, following the invasion of Poland on 1 September 1939, led to the cancellation of the Congress scheduled for the end of 1939 (in US). FIDAC Executive meetings continued at the Paris headquarters, the last of which took place in March 1940. A few weeks later France was invaded by the Axis powers and FIDAC's existence had come to an end.

== The FIDAC presidents ==
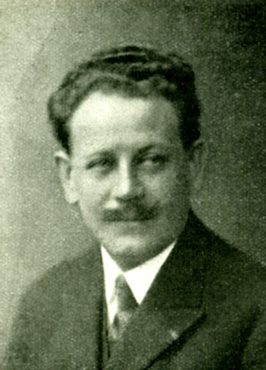
Charles Bertrand

The president of FIDAC was elected at every annual congress.

After Charles Bertrand, FIDAC's first president (1920–1924), the following were elected as presidents:

- Colonel Thomas W. Miller (USA) 1924–1925;
- Lieutenant-Colonel George R. Crosfield (United Kingdom) 1925–1926;
- Marcel Héraud (France) 1926–1927;
- Comm. Nicola Sansanelli (Italy) 1927–1928;
- Achille Reisdorff (Belgium) 1928–1929;
- Lieutenant-Colonel Fred W. Abbot (United Kingdom) 1929 – 1930;
- Lieutenant-Colonel Milan G. Radossavlevitch (Yugoslavia) 1930 – 1931;
- Major Edward L. White (USA) 1931 – 1932;
- General Roman Gorecki (Poland) 1932 – 1933;
- Victor Cadere (Romania) 1933 – 1934;
- Jean Desbons (France) 1934 – 1935, and others.

Each country was represented on the board by a vice-president elected within its national branch.

Unfortunately, the federation did not survive World War II. Its activity was continued by the World Veterans Federation, that was founded after the end of World War II in 1950, also in Paris, and had the motto: "None can speak more eloquently for peace than those who have fought in war."

== Image gallery ==
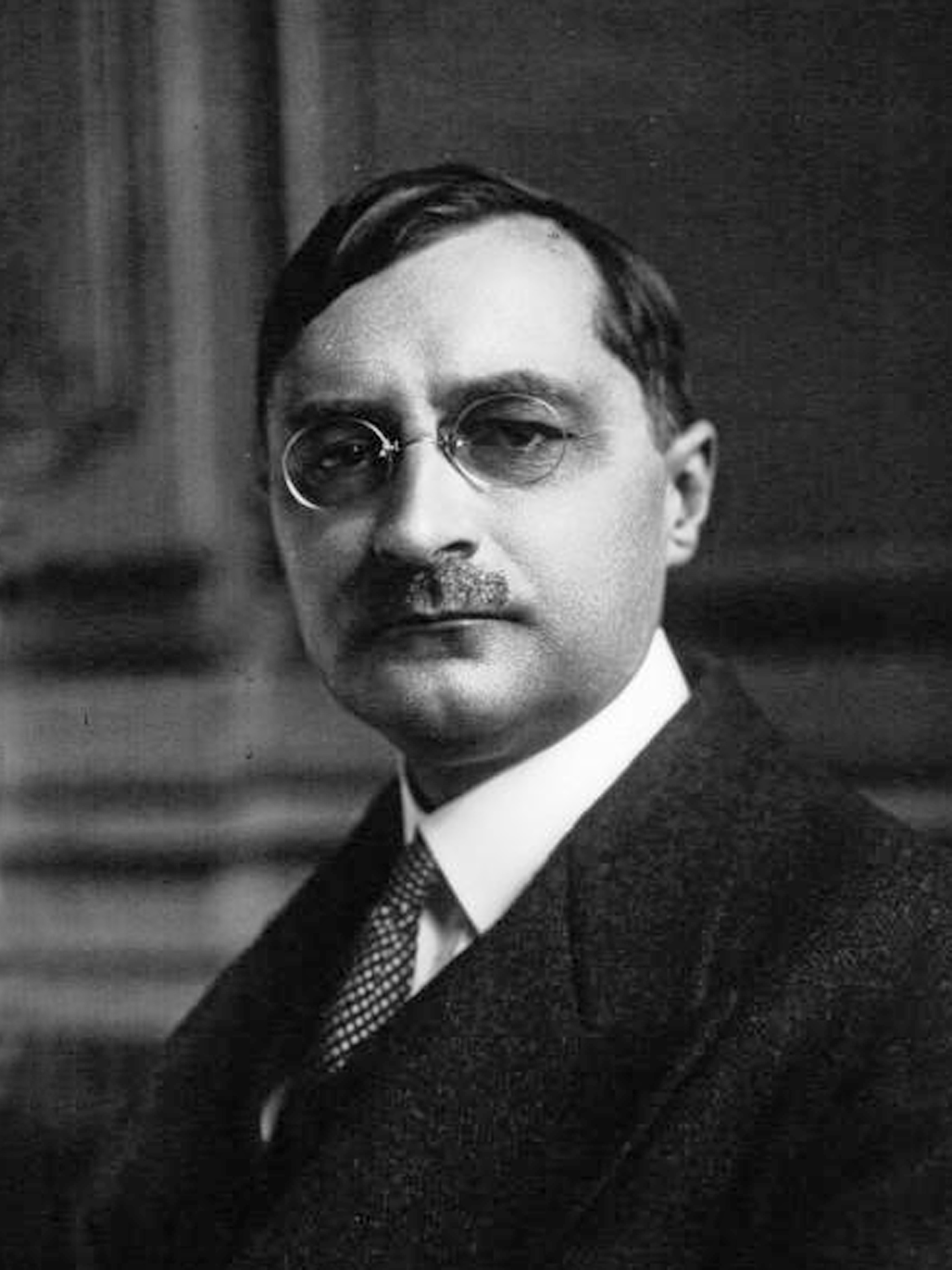
Marcel Héraud

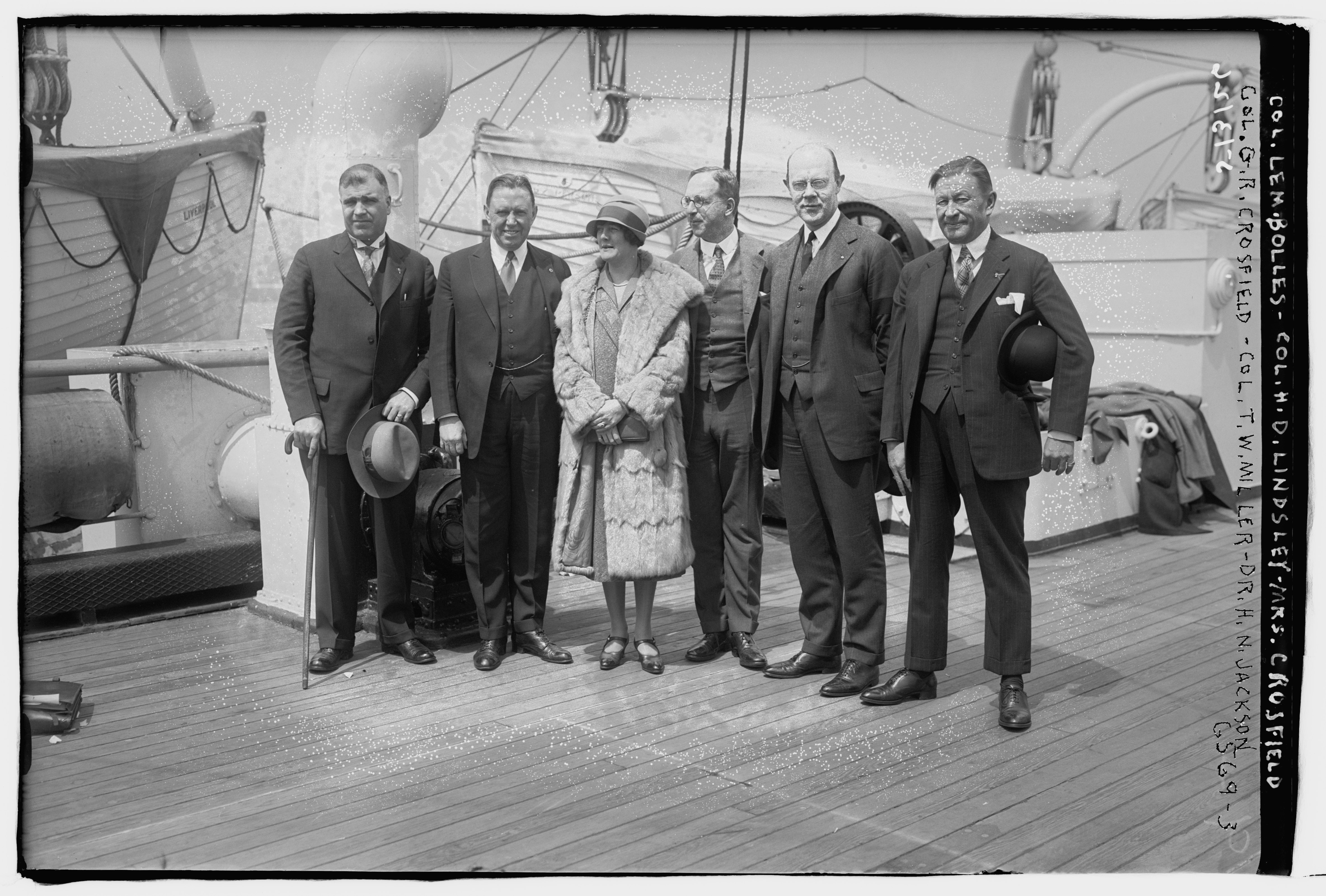
Crosfield, Miller, Bolles in 1926

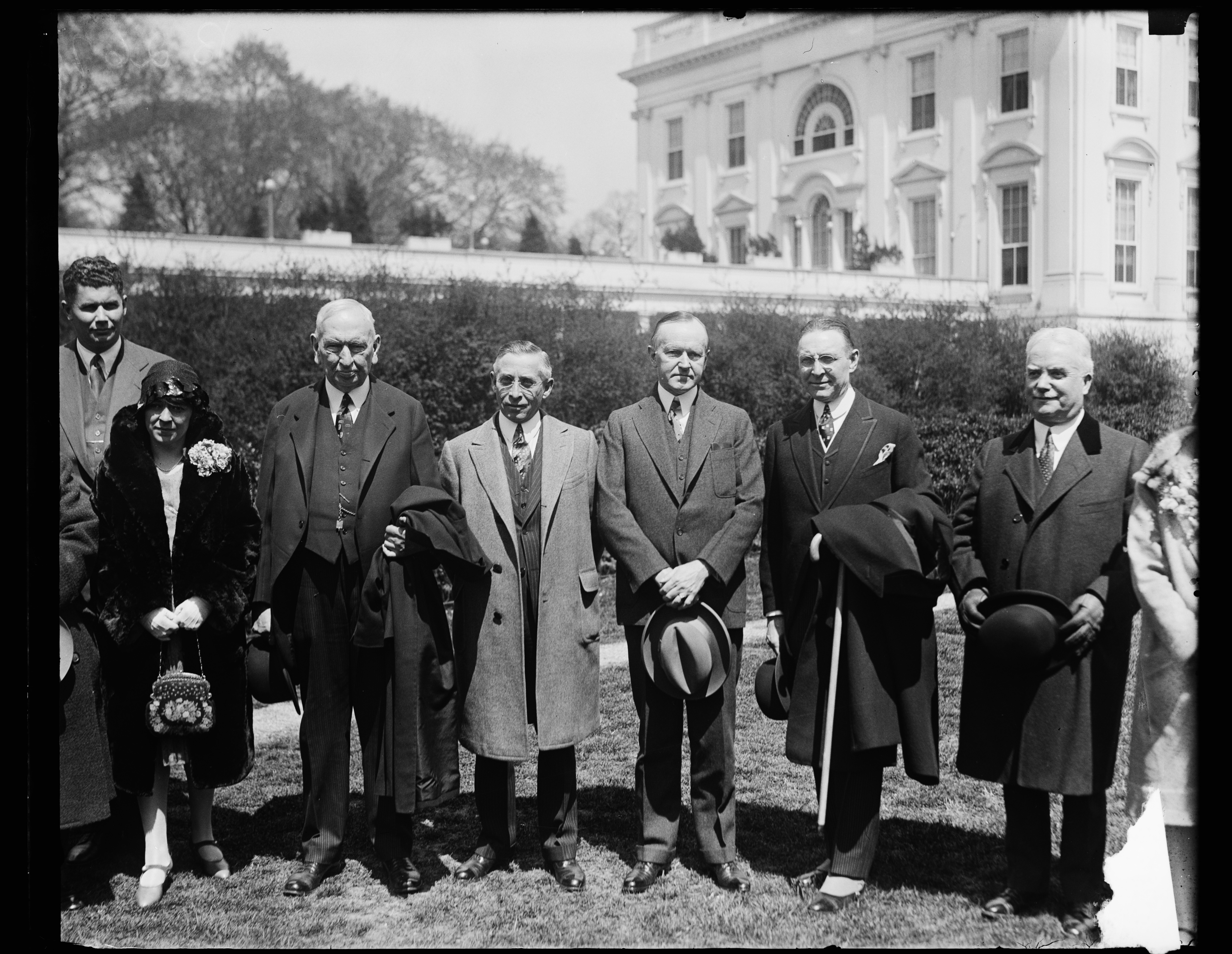
Sansanelli, White with US president Coolidge in 1929

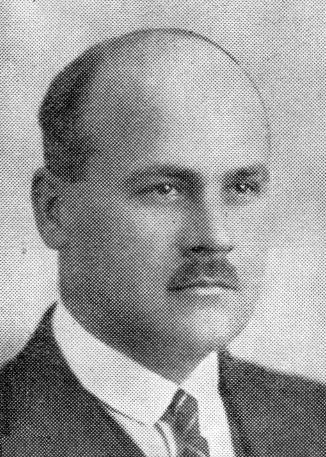
Victor Cădere

== Bibliography ==
- F.I.D.A.C. (Fédération Interalliée des Anciens Combattants) – Historique. Statuts. Règlement intérieur. Carte d’Identité FIDAC. La Médaille Scolaire FIDAC | History. Constitution. By-Laws. FIDAC Identity Card. FIDAC Educational Medal; Paris; 1933

Additional resources

- Eichenberg, Julia and Newman, John Paul; The Great War and Veterans' Internationalism; Palgrave Macmillan; 2013
- Murphy, James Raymond; Fidac and Peace; University of Hawaii Bulletin, V16, No. 1; 1936
