= December 1920 =

Month of 1920

<<	December 1920					>>
Su	Mo	Tu	We	Th	Fr	Sa
			1	2	3	4
5	6	7	8	9	10	11
12	13	14	15	16	17	18
19	20	21	22	23	24	25
26	27	28	29	30	31

December 16, 1920: Earthquake kills over 240,000 people in China

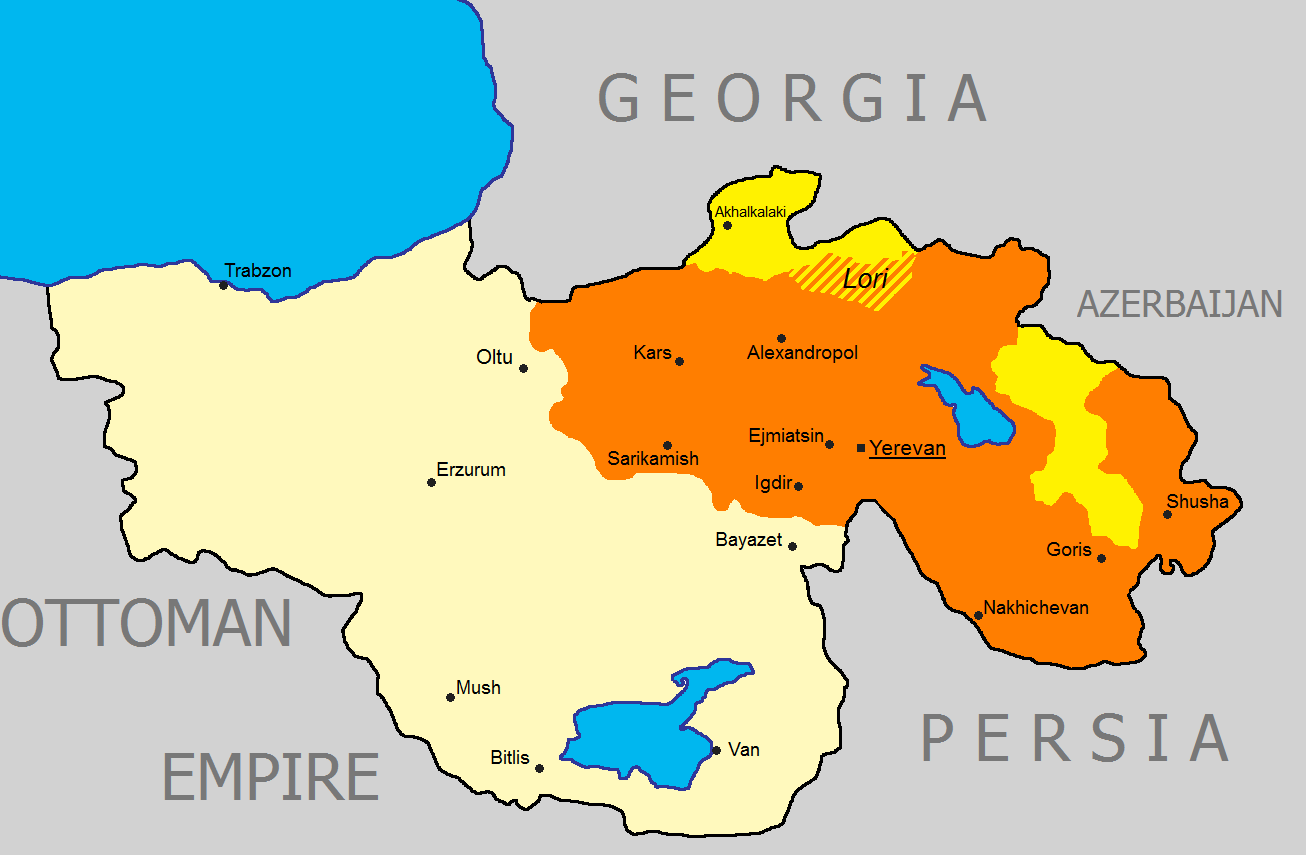
December 3, 1920: Armenia cedes most of its territory to Turkey after disastrous war

December 23, 1920: Government of Ireland Act divides island into Protestant northern and Catholic southern entities

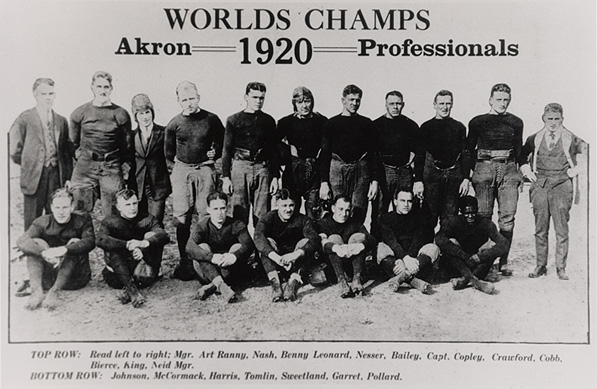
December 12, 1920: Akron Pros win first NFL title, with 0 - 0 tie

The following events happened in December 1920

== December 1, 1920 (Wednesday) ==
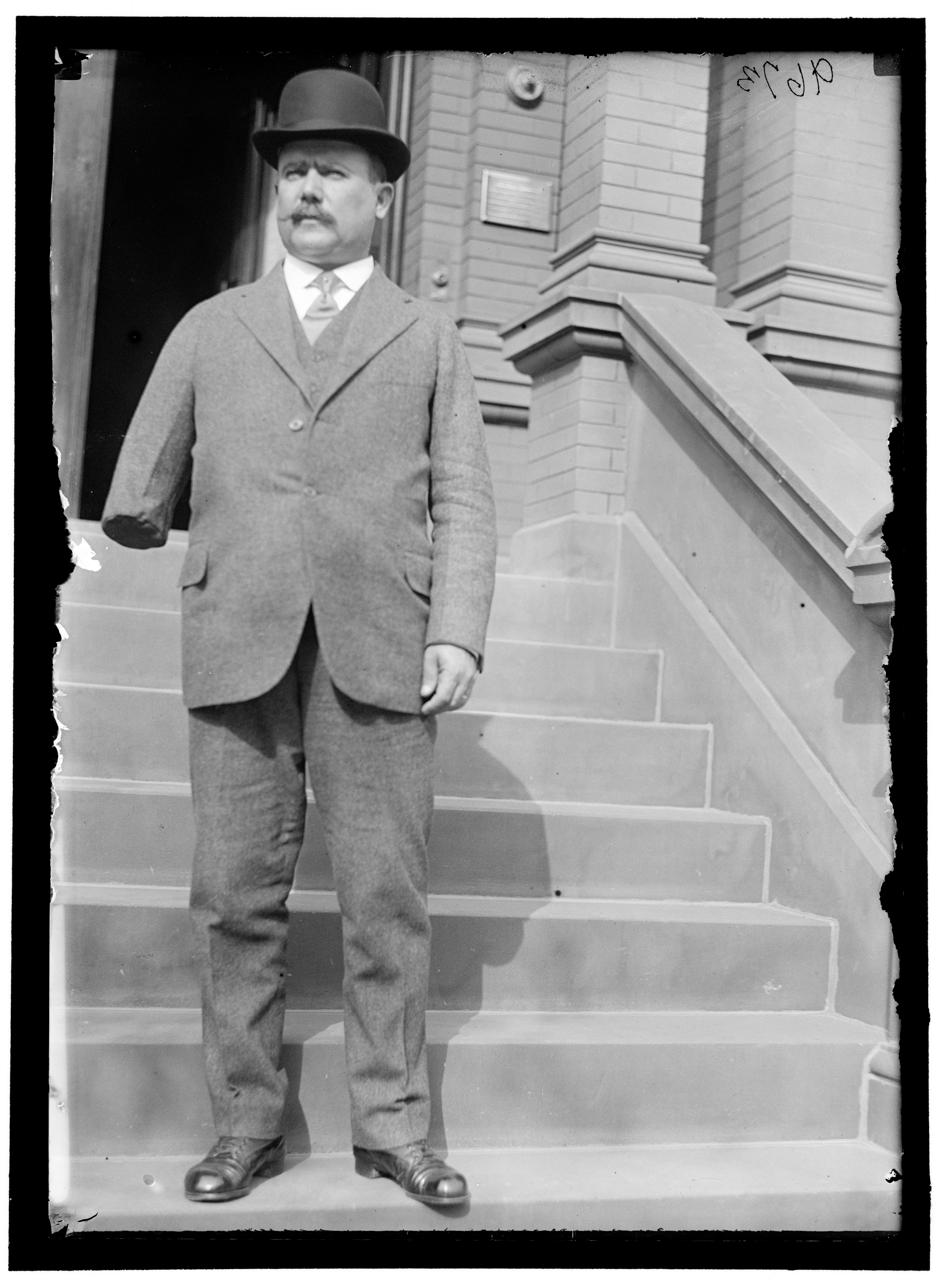
President Obregón

- General Alvaro Obregón was sworn into office as the new President of Mexico, bringing a close to the Mexican Revolution. Obregón, who had lost part of his right arm in battle, took the oath by raising his left hand, despite complaints by his critics. "It was the answer to placards posted around the city," Los Angeles reporter Robert Armstrong wrote, "saying that the new President could not comply with the Constitution which requires the right hand to be lifted during the ceremony." A historian, Archie Brown, would later write, "he put in place not only educational and labour reform but anticlerical policies, which were, ultimately, and in the most literal sense, fatal for him."
- William C. Durant, co-founder and president of General Motors, resigned under pressure from creditors and the GM board of directors.
- Born:
  - Le Duc Anh, Vietnamese politician, fourth President of Vietnam from 1992 to 1997; in Phú Lộc District, French Indochina (present-day Vietnam) (d. 2019)
  - Yevgeniya Zhigulenko, Soviet Air Force bomber pilot, awarded the title of Hero of the Soviet Union for 968 missions over Germany during World War II, later a film director; in Krasnodar, Russian SFSR, Soviet Union (d. 1994)

== December 2, 1920 (Thursday) ==
- A pro-Soviet government took control of the independent Democratic Republic of Armenia after Prime Minister Simon Vratsian resigned and turned over control to the Armenian Communist Party and First Secretary Georg Alikhanian. Sarkis Kassian was made the President. The Armenian Soviet Socialist Republic remained nominally independent until becoming part of the Soviet Union on March 12, 1922.
- Britain, France and Italy, the victors in World War I, sent a diplomatic note to the government of Greece, warning the Greek government that the allies opposed the return of King Constantine to the throne.
- Born:
  - Wilhelm Crinius, German Luftwaffe fighter ace, credited with 114 victories in 400 combat missions; in the village of Hohenhausen in Kalletal (present-day North Rhine-Westphalia) (d. 1997)
  - Veronica Maclean, British food writer, known for Lady Maclean's Cook Book and subsequent cookery books in the "Lady Maclean" series; in London (d. 2005)

== December 3, 1920 (Friday) ==
- Armenia agreed to cede a majority of its territory (104,000 of 174,000 km^{2} or 40,000 of 67,000 mi^{2}) back to Turkey as its representatives signed the Treaty of Alexandropol following Armenia's defeat in November's Turkish–Armenian War. Armenia agreed to renounce the Treaty of Sèvres of August 10, which had created the new republic from the territory of the Russian and Ottoman Empires.
- The Prime Ministers of the Allied Nations (the United Kingdom, France and Italy) informed the Greek government that all financial aid would be withdrawn if King Constantine was returned to the throne. The Allied Supreme Council had forced Constantine's abdication in 1917 because of his interference with the Allied war effort.
- Born: Eduardo Francisco Pironio, Argentinian Roman Catholic Cardinal, designated a Servant of God following his death as the first step in an ongoing cause for canonization; in Nueve de Julio(d. 1998)
- Died: Leon Chechemian, 72, leader of the Armenian Catholic Church; died in exile in Great Britain (b. 1848)

== December 4, 1920 (Saturday) ==
- Argentina became the first nation to withdraw its membership in the League of Nations, after resistance to four of its proposals. "Argentina's neutral position in World War I led to its isolation within the League of Nations," a historian, Rut Diamint, notes, and the South American nation's delegate, Honorio Pueyrredón, had been instructed to lobby the League to change its policy of distinguishing between belligerents and allies when deciding on membership and participation.
- The first major confrontation between prohibition agents of the U.S. Bureau of Internal Revenue (colloquially known as "revenuers" or "revenooers") and illegal manufacturers of "moonshine" (distilled spirits with a 75 percent or higher alcohol content) took place in an isolated area in Bell County and Knox County, Kentucky, near their border with Claiborne County, Tennessee. Fourteen agents and two U.S. Marshals fought a gun battle with an estimated 40 moonshiners, with over 1,000 shots fired during an attempt to serve arrest warrants. Ultimately, nine of the suspects surrendered, an undetermined number were wounded, and the others fled further into the wilderness.
- The new American Professional Football Association, now the National Football League, played in New York City for the first time, with a game at the Polo Grounds, "featuring in their line-ups some of the past stars of intercollegiate football", including Canton's Jim Thorpe. The Buffalo All-Americans defeated the Canton Bulldogs, 7 to 3, before a crowd of 12,000 people. In the third quarter, shortly after Thorpe kicked a field goal for Canton, Buffalo's Swede Youngstrom returned a blocked punt for a touchdown and Bodie Weldon kicked the point after.

== December 5, 1920 (Sunday) ==
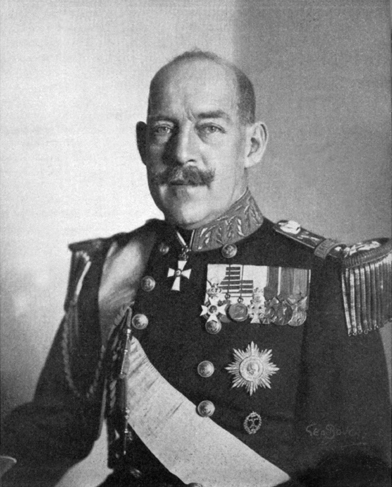
King Constantine

- Voters in a plebiscite in Greece overwhelmingly favored the return of King Constantine to the throne, with 999,954 votes out of 1,012,337 cast. Only 10,383 voted against Constantine; there were no other candidates for the throne and only half of the eligible voters participated.
- Born: Cao Tianqin, Chinese biochemist, discovered the structure of the myosin proteins responsible for the function of the muscle; in Beijing, Republic of China (d. 1995)
- Died:
  - Benjamin Holt, 71, American inventor, patented the first workable tractor vehicle that used a continuous track to spread the weight of its wheels, founder of the Caterpillar Tractor Company (b. 1849)
  - Boris Batursky, 41, Russian trade union organizer; died of typhus two days after his release from a Soviet prison (b. 1879)

== December 6, 1920 (Monday) ==
- The unusual saga of the "Sicilian Sleeping Beauty", one of the most well-preserved mummies of the 20th Century, began with the death from the Spanish influenza of Rosalia Lombardo, one week before her second birthday. Rosalia's parents asked the renowned embalmer Alfredo Salafia to preserve their child's body for placement in the Catacombe dei Cappuccini, in Palermo on the Italian island of Sicily. For almost a century, thousands of visitors have seen her well-preserved remains inside of a glass-topped coffin, because of Salafia's use of a combination of glycerin, formalin, zinc sulfate, zinc chloride, alcohol and salicylic acid. Because of an optical illusion caused by the child's partially open eyelids and sunlight that filters into the windows, Rosalia's eyes appear to open and close during the day.
- The Clothing Manufacturers' Association broke all relations with the Amalgamated Clothing Workers of America.
- Born:
  - Dave Brubeck, American cool jazz pianist; in Concord, California (d. 2012)
  - George Porter, British chemist, Nobel Prize in Chemistry laureate in 1967; in Stainforth, South Yorkshire (d. 2002)

== December 7, 1920 (Tuesday) ==
- The Draft Mandates for Mesopotamia and Palestine were submitted by Arthur Balfour, the UK's Lord President of the Council and the former British Foreign Secretary, to the League of Nations. The League's Secretary General, Sir Eric Drummond, received the mandates, providing for the administration of the former Ottoman Empire territories that would become Iraq, Israel and Jordan. The Mandate for Mesopotamia and the Mandate for Palestine had been governed by separate British High Commissioners since earlier in the year.
- U.S. President Woodrow Wilson delivered his last State of the Union address. Because of his illness, he sent it as a written communication rather than speaking before both houses of the U.S. Congress. The speech was read aloud, in the separate house chambers, by the respective clerks. William Tyler Page read the text to the U.S. House of Representatives and George A. Sanderson did the same before the U.S. Senate. Wilson had been the first modern U.S. president to deliver the annual message in a speech to Congress, setting a precedent that has been in place for most, but not all years since then.
- Died: José Sebastião de Almeida Neto, 79, Portuguese cleric and exiled Patriarch of Lisbon (b. 1841)

== December 8, 1920 (Wednesday) ==
- Max Goldstein, a Romanian terrorist, placed a bomb in the Romanian Senate chamber that killed three people, Justice Minister Dimitrie Greceanu, Senator Spirea Gheorghiu and Bishop Demetriu Radu.
- Died: John Botha, 41, South African rugby union player; killed by a lightning bolt while outside his home at Standerton (b. 1879)

== December 9, 1920 (Thursday) ==
- Michael Hainisch was sworn into office as the first President of Austria, serving two four-year terms.
- The California Alien Land Law of 1920, an amendment to the Webb-Heney Act of 1913, went into effect after being approved by California voters in a November 2 referendum. The amendment to the law, ostensibly prohibiting "aliens ineligible for citizenship" from leasing agricultural property in California (the 1913 law barred ownership but allowed for a three-year lease), was primarily directed at immigrants from Japan, but affected other Asian immigrants who were ineligible for U.S. citizenship because of quotas.
- Born:
  - Carlo Azeglio Ciampi, Italian politician and statesman, Prime Minister of Italy from 1993 to 1994, President of Italy from 1999 to 2006; in Livorno, Kingdom of Italy (d. 2016)
  - Sigmund Eisner, American medieval literature scholar who specialized in the works of Geoffrey Chaucer; in Red Bank, New Jersey (d. 2012)
  - Cyril Domb, British-Israeli theoretical physicist; in London (d. 2012)

== December 10, 1920 (Friday) ==
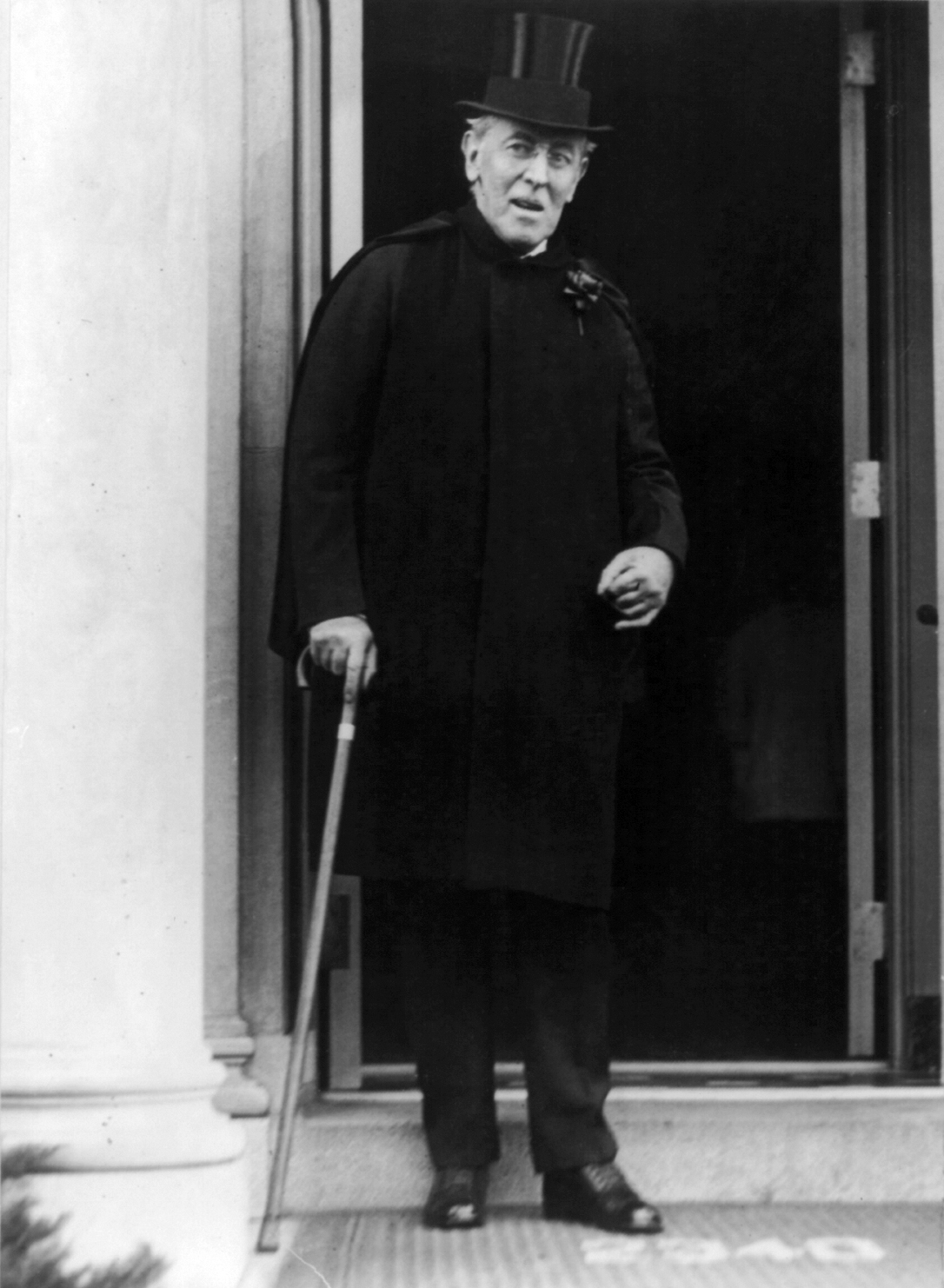
Wilson

- U.S. President Woodrow Wilson was awarded the Nobel Peace Prize for his work in establishing the League of Nations. Because of illness, President Wilson was unable to travel to Christiana (now Oslo) to accept the award and his message was read aloud by the U.S. Minister to Norway, Albert G. Schmedeman.
- Under the authority of the Restoration of Order in Ireland Act 1920, U.K. Prime Minister David Lloyd George announced martial law in the counties of Cork, Limerick, Tipperary and Kerry, with power for the British Army to arrest people and put them on trial under court-martial. Lloyd George pledged also to work with all Sinn Féin members of the House of Commons except for those charged with serious crimes by British Army authorities.
- Born: Stanko Todorov, Bulgarian politician, Prime Minister of Bulgaria from 1971 to 1981, Bulgaria's acting president in July 1990; in Klenovik, Pernik Province, Kingdom of Bulgaria (d. 1996)
- Died: Horace Dodge, 52, American automobile manufacturer, co-founded the Dodge Brothers Motor Company in 1900, now a division of Fiat Chrysler (b. 1868)

== December 11, 1920 (Saturday) ==
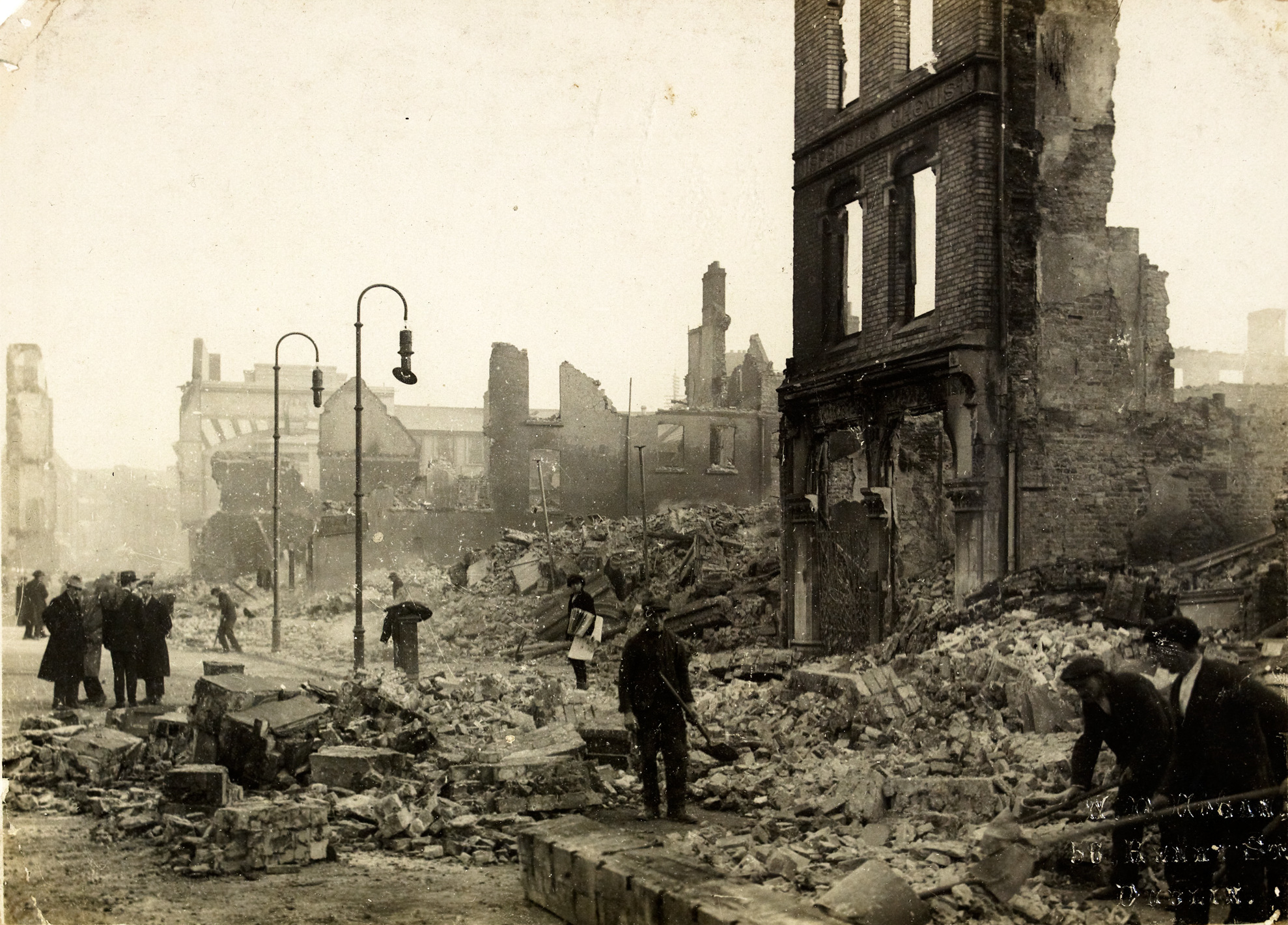
The ruins of Cork

- In retaliation for a Sinn Féin ambush on two truckloads of military police, Unionists set fire to the business district of the Irish city of Cork and burned down the City Hall. Earlier in the evening, three Unionist police were killed and several wounded in the ambush at Pillons Creek. Shortly afterward, fires were set in the commercial section area bounded by St. Patrick's Street, Cork Street, Old Georges Street and Maylor Street.
- The garment workers' labor unions of New York City formed the Needle Trade Workers' Alliance.
- Died: Olive Schreiner, 65, South African Afrikaner novelist and political activist (b. 1855)

== December 12, 1920 (Sunday) ==
- The American Professional Football Association teams with the best records met in the regular season closer, with the undefeated Akron (O.) Pros (8-0-2) playing against the Decatur (Ill.) Staleys (10-1-1), who had only one loss in their first 12 games. Although the game was not a post-season playoff, it was described in the press as a meeting between the "champions of the east" (Akron) and the "winners of the western title" (Decatur). The game took place at Cubs Park in Chicago (now Wrigley Field) before a crowd of 12,000 and ended in a scoreless tie, 0 to 0, allowing Akron to remain undefeated (though tied three times). At a meeting of team owners on April 30, 1921, a vote would be taken and Akron would be awarded the Brunswick-Balke-Collender Cup. The Akron Pros are recognized by the NFL as the league's first champion.
- Haribo candy founded in Germany in Bonn by Hans Riegel. The name is an acronym for Hans Riegel Bonn. In 1922, Riegel would introduce Gummibärchen, gum arabic based candies in the shape of a bear, and known in English-speaking nations as "gummy bears."
- Born:
  - Jorge Dória, Brazilian film actor and humorist; as Jorge Pires Ferreira, in Rio de Janeiro (d. 2013)
  - Margot Duhalde, Chilean pilot, Chile's first female military pilot; in Río Bueno (d. 2018)

== December 13, 1920 (Monday) ==
- The U.S. Sedition Act of 1918 was repealed. Passed during World War I to suppress speech against the war plans of the U.S. government, the Act provided for a prison sentence as a penalty for the use of "disloyal, profane, scurrilous, or abusive language" against the U.S. government or the U.S. armed forces.
- Astronomers Francis G. Pease and John A. Anderson made the first measurement of the size of a star (other than the Sun), by using Albert A. Michelson's stellar inferometer and the 100-inch telescope at Mount Wilson to determine the size of the red giant Betelgeuse (Alpha Orionis). Betelgeuse was found to be 300 times larger than the Sun, with a diameter of 240,000,000 miles (390,000,000 km), based on trigonometric calculation from an apparent angular measure of 0.047 of an arcsecond in the Earth sky and the star's 700 light year distance from Earth.
- The treaty establishing the first World Court was accepted by a vote of the League of Nations General Assembly. However, the compromise plan did require both sides to a dispute to submit to its jurisdiction, but it did not penalize a nation for noncompliance with its decisions. The treaty was signed three days later by 38 of the 46 nations at Geneva. It would become effective on October 8, 1921, after ratification by 27 nations.
- Born:
  - George P. Shultz, American economist and businessman, U.S. Secretary of State from 1982 to 1989, U.S. Secretary of the Treasury from 1972 to 1974; in New York City (d. 2021)
  - Kaysone Phomvihane, Laotian politician, prime minister of Laos from 1975 to 1991; as Nguyễn Cai Song, in Na Seng Village, French Indochina (present-day Laos) (d. 1992)

== December 14, 1920 (Tuesday) ==
- Shiromani Akali Dal, often referred to as Akali Dal, was formed as a political party by the Sikh religious community in British India, beginning the Akali movement to reform the operation of individual gurdwaras, the Sikh places of worship.
- The House of Lords passed an amended version of the Government of Ireland Act 1920 and sent it back to the UK House of Commons. The occasion marked "the first Irish home rule bill in history to pass that assembly."
- Born:
  - Frank T. Cary, American executive and businessman, Chairman of the Board of IBM from 1973 to 1981; in Gooding, Idaho (d. 2006)
  - Clark Terry, African American swing music and jazz trumpeter; in St. Louis (d. 2015)
- Died: George Gipp, 25, American college football halfback for Notre Dame, nicknamed "The Gipper;" died of pneumonia (b. 1895)

== December 15, 1920 (Wednesday) ==
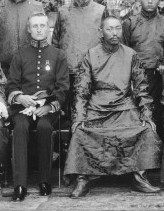
Bell and the Dalai Lama

- In his capacity as the UK Secretary of State for War, Winston Churchill informed the House of Commons that the United Kingdom would withdraw all of its troops from the Sultanate of Persia (now the Islamic Republic of Iran) before the end of 1921. "One must remember that one is dealing with Orientals," Churchill said, "and the Persians, as well as others there, move slowly, but we have had to say to them that we really cannot stay any longer, and that if they do not by the spring get their own forces ready that they may take it we are leaving indefinitely." Withdrawal would be completed by April 1.
- The 13th Dalai Lama granted permission for the first expedition to climb Mount Everest, the world's highest mountain, following a conference with Sir Charles Bell, the United Kingdom's emissary to Tibet. Bell telegraphed the Viceroy of British India, Lord Chelmsford, who, in turn, then notified the India Office, "Bell telegraphs that he has explained to Dalai Lama object of desired exploration and necessity of travelling through Tibetan territory, and obtained Tibetan Government's consent."
- Austria was admitted into the League of Nations.
- Born:
  - James William Colbert Jr., American physician; in New York City (d. 1974, killed in the Eastern Air Lines Flight 212 crash)
  - Bernice Falk Haydu, American aviator, recipient of the Congressional Gold Medal for her service as a test pilot for the Women Airforce Service Pilot during World War II; in Montclair, New Jersey (d. 2021)
  - Peter Lloyd, Australian aviator and air sports administrator, President of the Fédération Aéronautique Internationale (FAI) from 1986 to 1988; as George Alfred Lloyd, in Cremorne, New South Wales(d. 2022)
  - Lewis Millett, United States Army officer, Medal of Honor recipient, in 1951 he led the last American bayonet charge in wartime; in Mechanic Falls, Maine (d. 2009)

== December 16, 1920 (Thursday) ==
- An 8.7 magnitude earthquake killed over 234,000 people in the Haiyuan area of China's Gansu province. The earthquake struck at 8:05 in the evening local time and killed 73,027 people in the city of Haiyuan, as well as 30,000 in Guyuan and 20,000 in Longde. The official death toll announced by the Chinese government was 234,117 with more than 100,000 buried alive in landslides of loess deposits. A contemporary report by Upton Close and Elsie McCormick, summarizing the reluctance of local authorities to allow news to travel outside of Gansu, said of the earthquake, "It is, perhaps, the most poorly advertised calamity that has occurred in modern times."
- Bulgaria, Costa Rica, Finland and Luxembourg were admitted to the League of Nations. However, the admission committee reported unfavorably and the League Assembly voted against the admission of Georgia (10 for, 13 against and 19 abstaining), Estonia (8 for, 27 against), and Lithuania and Latvia (5 for, 29 against) and the application filed earlier by the First Republic of Armenia was not considered, in that the First Republic government had been deposed earlier in the month.

== December 17, 1920 (Friday) ==
- The Supreme Council of the League of Nations granted mandates over the former German overseas colonies to different nations. South Africa to the mandate over the former German South West Africa (Deutsch-Südwestafrika), now the Republic of Namibia. Japan took authority for the South Seas Mandate for the former colonies lying north of the Equator, including the Marshall Islands and the areas that are now the Federated States of Micronesia. South of the Equator, Australia controlled the Mandate of New Guinea and the Mandate of Nauru and New Zealand controlled the Western Samoa Mandate.
- The League voted to admit the Principality of Albania as its 48th member, making an official recognition of its sovereignty. A committee on admission of new members had been unfavorable to the Balkan nation, but as the Associated Press noted "Albania was elected today with surprising unanimity, and no one was surprised more than Albania herself to find that she would be represented on the floor of the assembly at the closing session tomorrow."
- An earthquake in Argentina killed more than 150 people in the La Valle area of the Mendoza Province. The first shock happened at 3:00 in the afternoon and lasted for 15 seconds. Hardest hit was the village of Costa de Araujo, where 81 bodies were found.
- The Republican members of the U.S. House of Representatives met in a caucus and, by a vote of 106 to 61, agreed to push a bill to increase the number of representatives from 435 to 483 in time for the 1922 session. The proposed increase (which would fail to pass into law) would have been based on the 1920 census, which showed that seven predominantly Republican states had the largest percentage increases in population.
- Italy's Senate voted, 262 to 22, to ratify the Treaty of Rapallo.
- France's Chamber of Deputies voted a motion of confidence in the government of Prime Minister Georges Leygues, 493 to 65, after Andre Lefevre resigned as Minister of War.
- The French despatch ship Bar-le-Duc ran aground at Cape Doro in Greece and sank, with 26 of its crew of 105 killed.
- Born:
  - Kenneth E. Iverson, Canadian computer scientist, Turing Award winner, developed the programming language APL; in Camrose, Alberta (d. 2004)
  - Ewa Paradies, Nazi concentration camp overseer and war criminal, guard at the Bromberg-Ost women's concentration camp; in Lębork, Danzig (present-day Poland) (d. 1946, executed by hanging)
  - Hobart Taylor Jr., African American attorney, Special Legal Counsel and the Executive Vice Chairman of the President's Committee on Equal Employment Opportunities, first non-white person to direct the staff of a presidential commission; in Texarkana, Texas (d. 1981)

== December 18, 1920 (Saturday) ==
- After the period for voluntary surrender of firearms expired in Germany, as required by the Treaty of Versailles, the Allies' German Disarmament Commission ordered the military to begin a house-to-house search for weapons.
- Ten of 11 delegates to the League of Nations Supreme Council voted in favor of publishing League documents in the "universal language" of Esperanto (as well as the two official languages, English and French). The French delegate, Gabriel Hanotaux, exercised France's veto power, and commented that "As a member of the French Academy, and representing a very beautiful and old language... I ask that our French language should defend its rights against any imposition of new languages and new creations and that we should, therefore, adjourn the question."
- American aviator Amelia Earhart, a 23-year old stenographer in California, traveled in an airplane for the first time when her father paid pilot Frank Hawks for a 10-minute ride from an airfield in Long Beach. Determined to learn how to fly an airplane, Earhart would pay for her first flying lesson 16 days later. Earhart, who would later become the first woman to duplicate Charles Lindbergh's solo flight across the Atlantic Ocean, would disappear on July 2, 1937, along with navigator Fred Noonan, while attempting to fly around the world.
- Born:
  - Gianni Di Venanzo, Italian cinematographer; in Teramo, Kingdom of Italy (d. 1966)
  - Robert Leckie, American military historian and novelist; in Philadelphia (d. 2001)
  - Yevgeny Nikonov, Soviet sailor, posthumous Hero of the Soviet Union recipient; in Harku, Estonia (d. 1941)
  - Pierre Toura Gaba, Chadian politician and diplomat, first Minister of Foreign Affairs of Chad, served as Ambassador to West Germany and to the United States; at Maibyan, Moyen-Chari Prefecture, Chad (d. 1998)

== December 19, 1920 (Sunday) ==
- King Constantine of Greece made a triumphal return to Athens for the first time since being forced to abdicate on June 11, 1917. The King, recalled to the throne by the vast majority of voters in the recent plebiscite, arrived by train at the Lavrion Station, then boarded "a carriage drawn by six horses" and proceeded past a crowd of thousands to Omonoia Square (referred to in the foreign press as "the Place de la Concorde").
- Born:
  - David Susskind, American talk show host and TV producer; in New York City (d. 1987)
  - Little Jimmy Dickens, country music singer and inductee in to the Country Music Hall of Fame; as James Cecil Dickens, in Bolt, West Virginia (d. 2015)

== December 20, 1920 (Monday) ==
- Felix Dzerzhinsky reorganized the Soviet Union's intelligence service with the creation of the Foreign Intelligence Section of the Cheka secret police. The new agency was called the "IO" (Inostranniy Otdel), and its first director was Yakov Davtyan, who went by the codename Davidov.

== December 21, 1920 (Tuesday) ==
- The last U.S. War Savings Certificate stamps to raise revenue during World War I, were sold. Issued since 1917, the stamps were a quarterly-compounded 4% investment with a five-year maturity date. The final series had a maturity date of January 1, 1926.
- The first regularly scheduled daily radio broadcasts in the U.S. were started by the lone commercial radio broadcaster, Westinghouse Electric's KDKA in Pittsburgh.

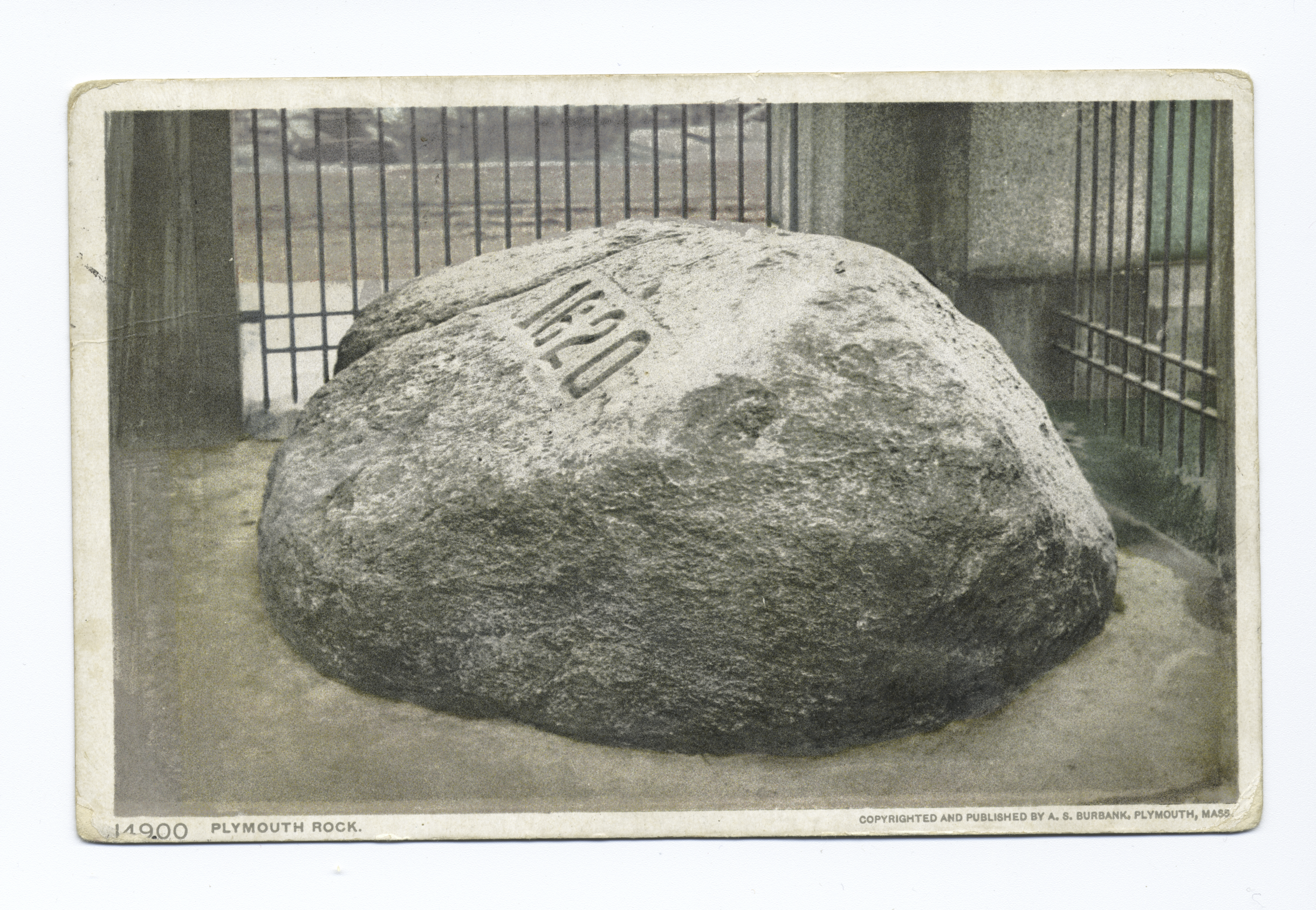
Plymouth Rock

- The 300th anniversary of the landing of the Pilgrims and their ship, the Mayflower, was observed at Plymouth, Massachusetts. On the day before the celebration, movers were hoisting the Plymouth Rock with chains to transfer it to the site of the festivities outside of the Old Colony Theatre when it split along the repairs that had been made to the rock in 1880. The two sections were cemented back together at the new site.
- The first patent for a hot comb, a self-heating comb used to straighten hair, was granted to Walter H. Sammons of Philadelphia, who received U.S. Patent number 1,362,823 after applying for it on April 9. The Sammons comb included a thermometer that extended into a well-insulated handle after noting that previous devices had been unsatisfactory because "when placed in other than very experienced hands they have resulted in irreparable damage to the hair and not infrequently to the hands of the user."
- Born:
  - Adele Goldstine, American mathematician and computer scientist, wrote the manual for the first electronic computer, ENIAC; as Adele Katz, in New York City (d. 1964)
  - Alicia Alonso, Cuban prima ballerina and choreographer; as Alicia Ernestina de la Caridad del Cobre Martínez del Hoyo, in Havana (d. 2019)

== December 22, 1920 (Wednesday) ==
- The Soviet Union's Eighth All-Russian Congress of Soviets of Workers’, Peasants’, Red Army and Cossack Deputies was convened in Moscow for eight days, and adopted economist Gleb Krzhizhanovsky's economic plan that would guide Soviet planning for the next 65 years, the GOELRO plan (an acronym for Gosudarstvellaya Elektrifikashii Rossii, the State Commission for the Electrification of Russia).
- The Brussels Conference came to a close as the victorious allies of World War I established a 42-year timetable for Germany to pay reparations to France and Belgium for damages caused by their invasion.
- At Nauvoo, Alabama, a member of Company M of the Alabama National Guard shot and killed Adrian Northcutt, one of the UMWA officials leading the strike of coal miners in Walker County. Northcutt's son-in-law, Willie Baird, shot and killed the guard, James Morris. Baird turned himself over to county officials to stand trial for charges of murder. On January 5, nine of the guardsmen of Company M broke into the county jail at Jasper, removed Baird, and executed him.

== December 23, 1920 (Thursday) ==
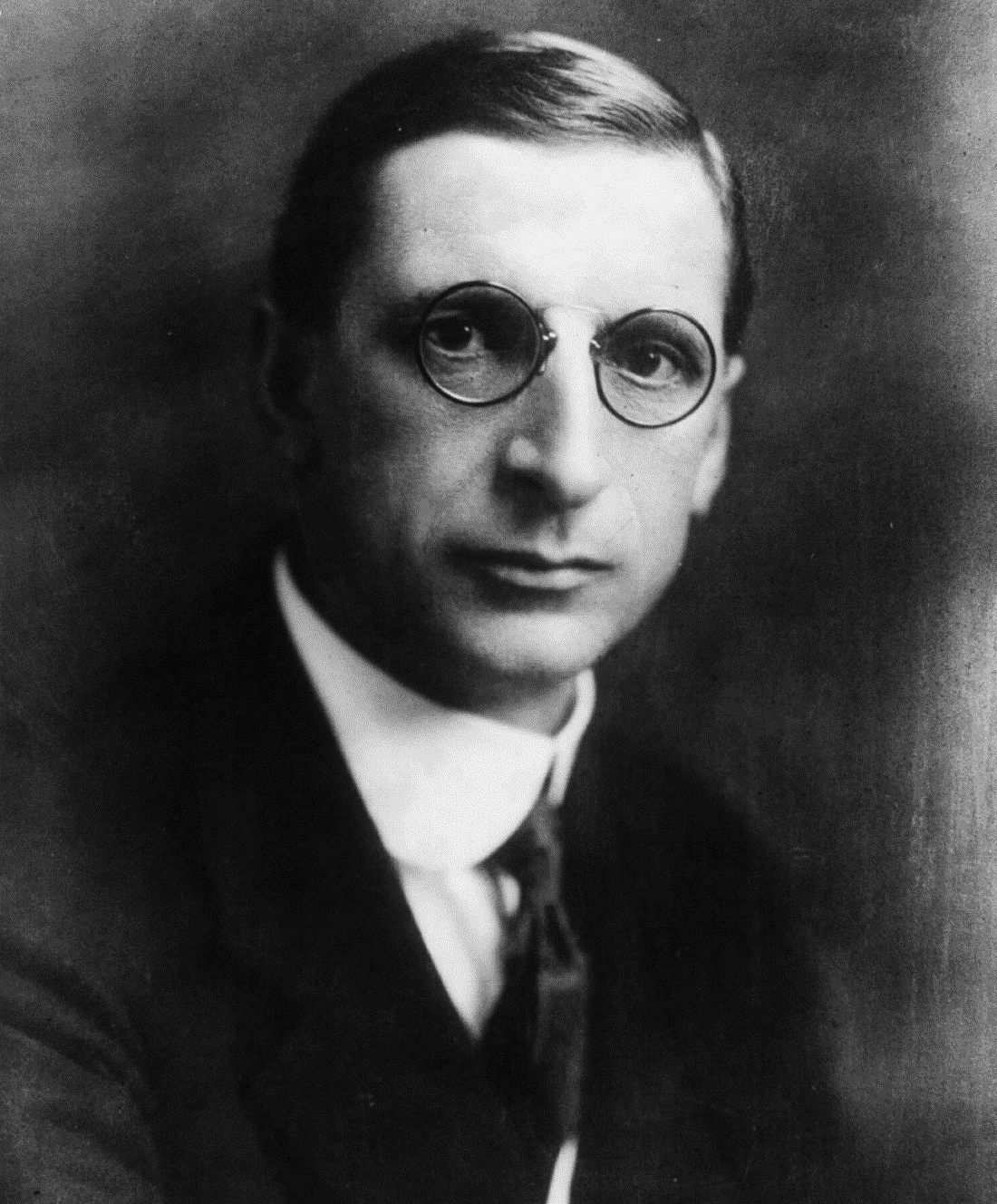
De Valera

- The Government of Ireland Act 1920, passed by the Parliament of the United Kingdom, received Royal Assent from King George V at 11:50 p.m., taking effect ten days later at midnight. The King wrote that "I deplore the campaign of violence and outrage, whereby a small section of my subjects seek to sever Ireland from the empire, and I sympathize with the loyal servants of the crown who are endeavoring to restore peace and maintain order under conditions of unexampled difficulty and danger... I sincerely hope that this act, the fruit of more than 30 years of ceaseless controversy, will finally bring about unity and friendship between all the peoples of my kingdom." The law provided for the partition of Ireland into the six predominantly Protestant counties of Northern Ireland and the predominantly Roman Catholic 26 northwestern and southern counties into Southern Ireland, each to have separate parliaments, and granting a measure of home rule.
- With warrants for his arrest pending in the United Kingdom, Irish nationalist Éamon de Valera secretly returned to Dublin after being smuggled across the Irish Sea from Liverpool on the ocean liner RMS Celtic, ending ten days at sea that had started with his departure from New York City at the end of an American tour. De Valera had been hidden in the cabin of the liner's second mate, and had almost been caught by the ship's captain and first mate when the liner was still in harbor at Liverpool.
- France and the United Kingdom signed a convention at San Remo whereby France agreed that the British could cross the desert in the French Mandate for Syria and the Lebanon. With the easement across Syria, the British Empire achieved a direct land route to British India for the first time in history, with the ability to build a railway line from the Mediterranean Sea at Palestine, to existing railway lines in Mesopotamia (now Iraq) and Persia (Iran).
- Arturo Alessandri was inaugurated as President of Chile.
- Arthur Schnitzler's controversial play Reigen (later translated into French as La Ronde and in English as Hands Around) was publicly performed for the first time, 20 years after it had first been printed, with a debut in Berlin. With ten scenes of couples seeking sexual relations, and the second partner in one moving on to a new relationship in the next scene (e.g., the first scene was "The Whore and the Soldier", followed by "The Soldier and the Parlor Maid" and then "The Parlor Maid and the Young Gentleman", etc.), the play elicited a violent reaction from the public and charges of immorality. The production would be met with a similar reaction at its debut in Vienna in February.
- The unincorporated community of Plehweville, Texas, changed its name at the request of the U.S. Department of the Post Office because of the number of letters misdirected because of the difficulty in spelling its name. The new name of the Mason County community, conferred by the new postmaster, Eli Dechart, was "Art", drawn from the last three letters of his surname.
- Born: Charles Heidelberger, American cancer researcher, developed the anticancer medication 5-Fluorouracil in 1956 as an effective treatment for multiple cancers; in New York City (d. 1983)
- Died: Cayetano Arellano, 73, first Chief Justice of the Supreme Court of the Philippines from 1901 to 1920 (b. 1847)

== December 24, 1920 (Friday) ==
- Bloody Christmas (Natale di sangue), a six-day military campaign by Italy against the State of Fiume began after a blockade failed to cause Gabriele D'Annunzio to yield. General Enrico Caviglia led 8,000 troops against D'Annunzio's 2,500 defenders.
- Diego Manuel Chamorro was declared to be the winner of the October 3 election for President of Nicaragua, by an almost unanimous decision of the Central American nation's Congress. Chamorro was inaugurated eight days later, on New Year's Day, succeeding his nephew, President Emiliano Chamorro. Supporters of Chamorro's opponent, former Foreign Minister Jose Andres Urtecha, had asked the U.S. Department of State to intervene.
- Born: Edy Reinalter, Swiss alpine skier and 1948 Olympic gold medalist in slalom; in St. Moritz (d. 1962)

== December 25, 1920 (Saturday) ==
- The Rosicrucian Fellowship Temple, known at The Ecclesia, was dedicated on a hill overlooking Oceanside, California. The temple serves as a healing center for The Rosicrucian Fellowship, an interpretation of Christianity organized in 1909, and the high mesa was named Mount Ecclesia.
- Born:
  - William J. Bordelon, U.S. Marine Sergeant, Medal of Honor recipient; in San Antonio, Texas (d. 1943, killed in action)
  - Victor Zalgaller, Soviet Russian mathematician; in Parfino, Novgorod Oblast, Russian SFSR, Soviet Union) (d. 2020)

== December 26, 1920 (Sunday) ==
- A record crowd to watch women play soccer football — 53,000 spectators — turned out at Goodison Park at the Walton in the British city of Liverpool, to watch the Dick, Kerr & Co. Ladies F.C. defeat the St. Helen's Ladies F.C., 4 to 0, in a charity fundraiser. The match attendance set a world record that would stand for 98 years, until March 17, 2019, when 60,739 fans in Madrid watched the Atletico Madrid and Barcelona women's teams play. In 1921, The Football Association of England stopped the increasing popularity of women's football by enacting a ban against female use of the FA's stadiums, including Goodison, the home stadium for the Everton F.C. men's team. The ban would not be lifted until 1971.

== December 27, 1920 (Monday) ==
- One of the largest evacuations from underground took place after a loss of electrical power stranded ten subway trains inside New York City's Montague Street Tunnel, at 5,000 feet (1,500 m) the longest tunnel in the Metropolitan Transit Authority system. Because the tunnel goes underneath the East River to connect Manhattan and Brooklyn, most of the 10,000 people inside the trains were required to walk a long distance along the tracks before they could reach an exit stairwell.
- Italian warships and battalions bombarded the city of Fiume in order to drive out Gabriele D'Annunzio, who had proclaimed himself as the leader of the Italian Regency of Carnaro.
- Horace Fairhurst, a defender for the English Second Division team Blackpool F.C., suffered a head injury during a 1 to 0 soccer football match over Barnsley. His condition worsened and he died 11 days later on January 7.

== December 28, 1920 (Tuesday) ==
- At Kharkiv, capital of the pro-Bolshevik Ukrainian Soviet Socialist Republic, representatives of the Ukrainian SSR and Soviet Russia signed the "Workers-Peasant Union Treaty", an "alliance of two ostensibly independent states [that] actually made both the Ukrainian military and the Ukrainian economy... subject to decisions made in Moscow."
- Bislig was created in the Philippine province of Surigao del Sur, by executive order of the U.S. Governor General, Francis B. Harrison. The city has a population of more than 95,000 people.
- Born:
  - Loretta Ford, American nurse and co-founder of the first nurse practitioner program, later first dean of the University of Rochester College of Nursing; as Loretta Pfingstel, in New York City (d. 2025)
  - Princess Antoinette of Monaco, French-born member of the ruling House of Grimaldi, heir to the throne from 1949 to 1957; as Antoinette Louise Alberte Suzanne Grimaldi, in Paris (d. 2011)

== December 29, 1920 (Wednesday) ==
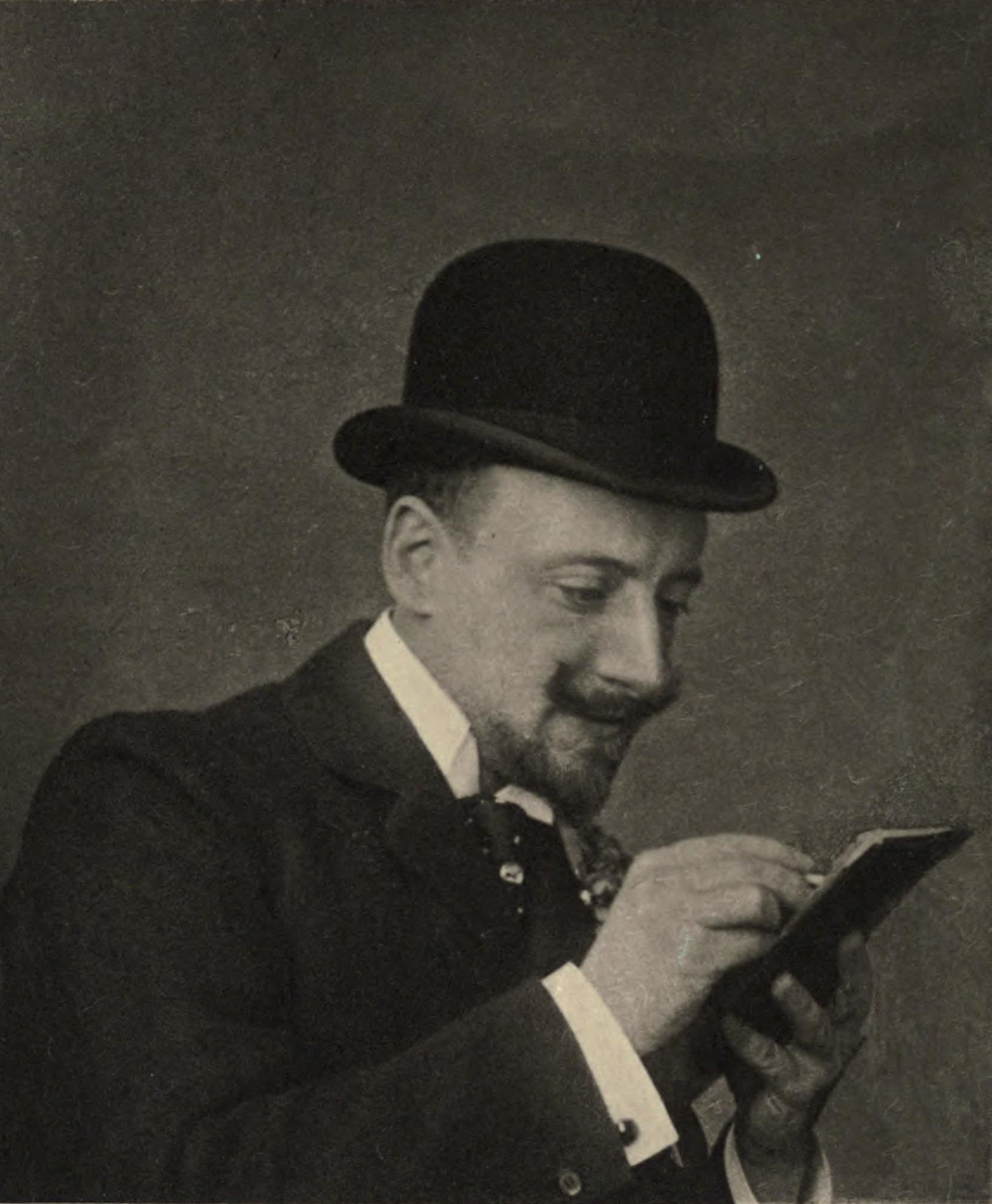
D'annunzio

- The Italian Army brought an end to the Italian Regency of Carnaro that had been proclaimed earlier in the year by Gabriele D'Annunzio in the Free State of Fiume. In the previous six days of battle, 25 Italian Army troops and 22 of Fiume's Legionnaires had been killed.
- U.S. President Wilson vetoed a bill extending the immunity of railroads from the Clayton Act prohibition against interlocking Boards of Directors.
- The Philippines municipality of Tudela, located in the province of Misamis Occidental, was founded by Executive Order of the American Governor General, Francis Burton Harrison. The city now has 29,000 people.
- Born:
  - Josefa Iloilo, Fijian politician, third President of Fiji from 2000 to 2009; in Vuda, Ba Province, Viti Levu, Colony of Fiji (d. 2011)
  - Viveca Lindfors, Swedish-born American stage, film and TV actress, Emmy Award winner; as Elsa Viveca Torstensdotter Lindfors, in Uppsala (d. 1995)

== December 30, 1920 (Thursday) ==
- Yugoslavia, at the time known as the Kingdom of the Serbs, Croats and Slovenes issued the Obznana, outlawing the Communist Party of Yugoslavia (Komunistička partija Jugoslavije).
- Born:
  - Jack Lord, American TV, stage and film actor best known as the star of Hawaii Five-O as Steve McGarrett, for its 12-season run; as John Joseph Patrick Ryan, in Brooklyn (d. 1998)
  - Sir David Fraser, British Army General and military historian; in Camberley, Surrey (d. 2012)
- Died:
  - Francis Maule Campbell, 75-76, English sportsman whose Blackheath F.C. began the divergence of rugby union football from association football in 1863 (b. c. 1844)
  - Habib Bey Salimov, 39, Azerbaijani military leader; executed by firing squad after failing to cooperate with the Bolshevik leaders of the Azerbaijan Soviet Socialist Republic (b. 1881)

== December 31, 1920 (Friday) ==
- French Marshal Ferdinand Foch, the Commander-in-Chief of the Allied Armies during World War I, presented his year-end report to the Allies and announced that Germany had failed to fully comply with the disarmament agreement made in the Treaty of Versailles. Although Germany had dismantled its fortresses and had reduced its regular army, the Reichswehr, to the agreed number of 100,000 troops, Marshal Foch noted that Germany had made no attempt to disarm its militias in eastern Prussia or in Bavaria. German factories were also continuing to manufacture and export munitions and aviation components.
- At Auckland, the United States team of Bill Johnston and Bill Tilden reclaimed the Davis Cup of tennis from the defending champion, Australasia (representing Australia and New Zealand with Australians Norman Brookes and Gerald Patterson), by winning the doubles competition, the third scheduled match of the best-3-of-5 series in the 1920 International Lawn Tennis Challenge. Tilden had beaten Brookes and Johnston beat Patterson the day before for the first two U.S. victories. On New Year's Day, the U.S. completed the sweep as Tilden beat Patterson and Johnston beat Brookes. The seven nation competition had started in June when Canada, France, Great Britain, the Netherlands, South Africa and the U.S. competed for the right to face Australasia.
- The Continental Baseball Association was incorporated as the first challenger since 1914 to the established National League and American League, with the unprecedented format of teams of African-American players and teams of White players. Promoter George Herman "Andy" Lawson announced in Boston that the eight franchises would be named for the states where they were located, naming Indiana (Indianapolis), Maryland (Baltimore), Massachusetts (Boston), Michigan (Detroit) New Jersey (Camden), New York (Buffalo or Brooklyn), Ohio (Cleveland) and Pennsylvania (Pittsburgh) as the prospective teams.
- Born: Rex Allen, American film and television actor, nicknamed "The Arizona Cowboy"; in Willcox, Arizona (d. 1999)
