= January 1921 =

Month in 1921

<<	January 1921					>>
Su	Mo	Tu	We	Th	Fr	Sa
						1
2	3	4	5	6	7	8
9	10	11	12	13	14	15
16	17	18	19	20	21	22
23	24	25	26	27	28	29
30	31

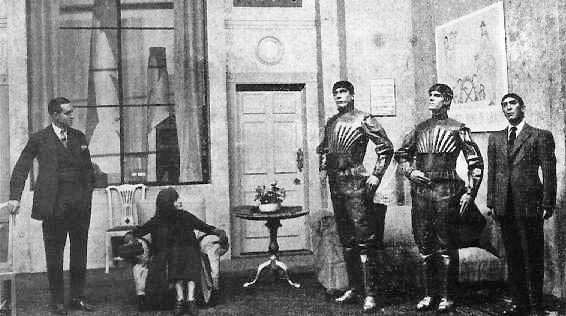
January 25, 1921: "Robots" introduced in fiction by Karel Čapek

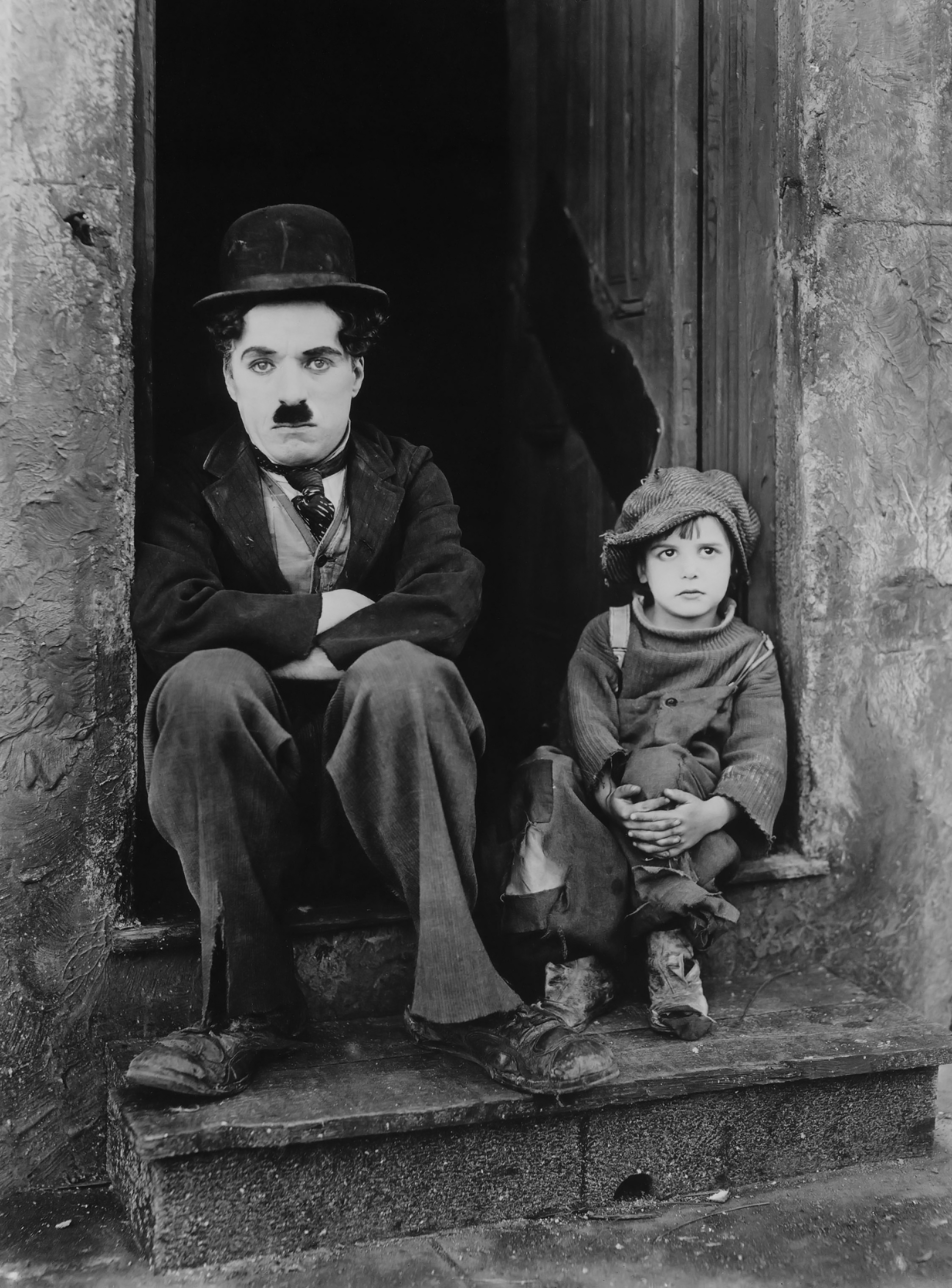
January 21, 1921: American hit film The Kid, with Charlie Chaplin and Jackie Coogan, premieres

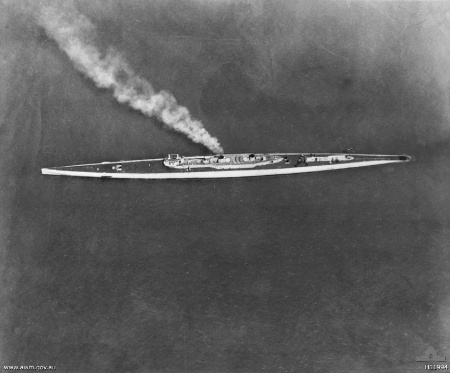
January 20, 1921: All 56 crew of British sub HMS K5 killed in sinking

The following events occurred in January 1921:

== January 1, 1921 (Saturday) ==
- E. W. Scripps and William Emerson Ritter founded Science Service, later renamed Society for Science & the Public in the United States, with the goal of keeping the public informed of scientific developments.
- The Allied forces announced that the Turkish government at Constantinople would be permitted to use 400,000 Turkish Pounds worth of gold from the Imperial Ottoman Bank for funds for the new government's treasury.

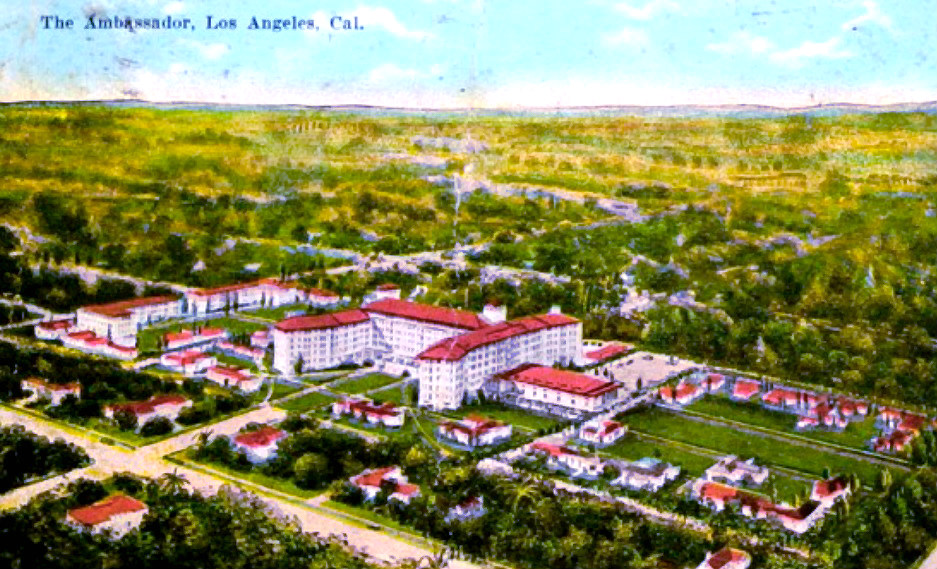
The new Ambassador Hotel

- The 24-acre Ambassador Hotel opened in Los Angeles at 12:01 a.m. to usher in the new year. The hotel, remembered now as the site of Robert F. Kennedy's assassination in 1968, would close to guests in 1989 and be torn down in 2005.
- In U.S. college football's only major postseason game, the 1921 Rose Bowl, an east-west match-up of two of the major undefeated teams, the California (8-0-0) defeated Ohio State (7-0-0), 28 to 0. In later years, the NCAA would retroactively named California the national college football champion for 1920. In the other postseason football game of the 1920 season, the Fort Worth Classic, Centre College defeated Texas Christian University, 63 to 7.
- Born: César Baldaccini, French modern sculptor of the Nouveau Réalisme movement; as Cesare Baldaccini; in Marseille(d. 1998)
- Died:
  - Theobald von Bethmann Hollweg, 64, Chancellor of Germany from 1909 to 1917, during the reign of Kaiser Wilhelm II (b. 1856)
  - Mary Macarthur, 40, Scottish suffragist and national secretary of the Women's Trade Union League; died of cancer (b. 1880)

== January 2, 1921 (Sunday) ==
- The Spanish liner Santa Isabel (Iquique) sank after running aground during a storm the night before, and striking rocks off the coast of Villa Garcia, killing 244 of the people on board. Most of the passengers and crew were below deck because of the rough weather.
- The British government issued an order to residents of Ireland requiring all households to post a list on their doors of the people residing in the dwelling, on penalty of criminal proceedings.
- Gabriele D'Annunzio ended his attempt to take over Fiume and abandoned the Italian Regency of Carnaro proclaimed by him in 1919.
- Cruzeiro Esporte Clube, one of Brazil's most successful soccer football teams, was founded in Belo Horizonte.
- Pittsburgh's KDKA (AM) radio station made the first live broadcast of a church service, and the first remote broadcast (using a telephone line to transmit the signal to the broadcasting transmitter), as it aired the Sunday services from Calvary Episcopal Church. The National Religious Broadcasters association would celebrate the anniversary half a century later by making "the first international religious broadcast to be transmitted live by satellite" on January 27, 1971.
- Word arrived that the U.S. Navy balloon A-5598, which had been missing since the day after its departure from Rockaway, New York on December 13, had been located after its crash landing 20 miles (32 km) north of Moose Factory, Ontario. The three aeronauts, U.S. Navy Lieutenants Louis A. Kloor Jr. (mission commander); Stephen A. Farrell (pilot) and Walter Hinton (ground observer), had been missing and were found alive. The trio of aeronauts recovered at Moose Factory, and arrived at the nearest town on a railway line, Mattice on January 11. The group, stranded in the wilderness, narrowly avoiding coming down in the James Bay, had wandered for four days before they located a Cree Indian fur trader who initially mistook them for Canadian revenue agents, and then guided the Americans to safety. The group returned to a heroes' welcome in New York City on January 14.
- Died:
  - William Robinson, 80, Irish-born American electrical engineer, inventor of the automatic track circuit signal that made railroad travel safer starting in the 1870s (b. 1840)
  - Doud Dwight "Ikky" Eisenhower, 3, son of U.S. Army Major Dwight Eisenhower and Mamie Eisenhower; died of scarlet fever. In his memoir after his service as President of the United States, Eisenhower would describe his child's death as "the greatest disappointment and disaster of my life, the one I have never been able to forget completely."

== January 3, 1921 (Monday) ==
- At 12:30 in the afternoon Milwaukee's radio station 9XM delivered the first weather forecast to be read on commercial radio, followed by the message in Morse code. Radio weather forecasts had previously been heard in the U.S. and the UK.

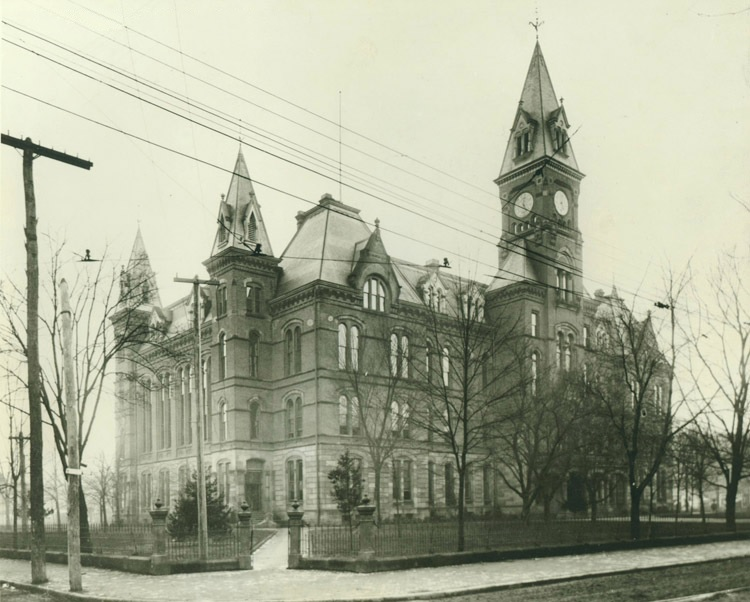
The Capitol before the fire

- A fire destroyed the West Virginia State Capitol Building in Charleston. The blaze started about 5:00 in the afternoon in a small room containing paper records of the state Public Service Commission and quickly spread, leaving only the outer shell of the building. An electrician and a fireman were killed in the collapse of a section of the roof. As a result, a 1921 session of the West Virginia Legislature created a seven-member "Capitol Building Commission", which would ultimately complete construction of the present Capitol building in 1932.
- Germany filed its reply to France's disarmament ultimatum over the terms of the Treaty of Versailles. The letter from German Chancellor Constantin Fehrenbach recited that Germany had done its best to adhere to the terms of the agreement, turning over 50,000 cannons, 60,000 machine guns, 5,000,000 rifles and 20,000 grenade launchers, but the fulfillment of the terms of the treaty to the letter had proven impossible.
- Amelia Earhart had her first flying lesson, given at Kinner Field, in what is now South Gate, California. Her teacher was Neta Snook, a pioneer female aviator who used a surplus Curtiss JN-4 "Canuck" for training.
- Born: Jean-Louis Koszul, French mathematician and algebraic topology theorist for whom the Koszul complex is named; in Strasbourg (d. 2018)

== January 4, 1921 (Tuesday) ==
- The U.S. House of Representatives voted 250 to 66 to override the veto made by U.S. President Wilson of the resolution to reviving the War Finance Corporation. The day before, the U.S. Senate had voted 53 to 5 to override.
- Britain extended martial law to four additional counties in Ireland— County Clare, County Waterford, County Wexford and County Kilkenny.
- The Mayor of Davenport, Iowa, C. L. Bargwald, elected as a candidate of the Socialist Party of America along with a majority of the city aldermen, announced that he was leaving the Socialist Party and called the leftist aldermen "disciples of Lenin, with whom no one could compromise." Over the previous six months, the mayor said, the Socialist majority had blocked any conservative proposal made by him and "forced a program of radical legislation on the city." Mayor Bargwald, who professed to be a follower of Leon Trotsky rather than Vladimir Lenin, said of the SPA "I'm through with them. The principles of Trotsky have no place in America."
- Born: Pedro Richter Prada, Peruvian General, served as Peru's Interior Minister from 1971 to 1975, then as Prime Minister of Peru and Defense Minister from 1979 to 1980, later charged in absentia in Italy for the murder of 25 Italian citizens; in Ayacucho (d. 2017)

== January 5, 1921 (Wednesday) ==
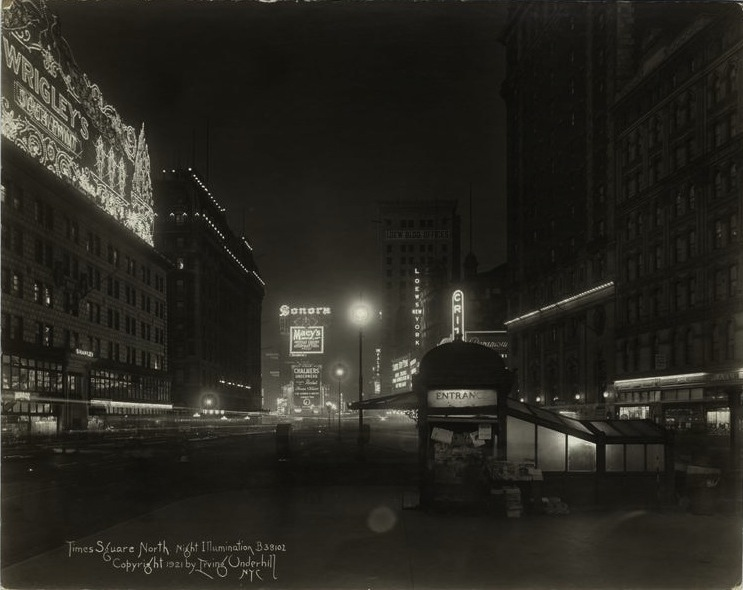
Times Square in 1921

- New York City put into effect "the most radical change in street traffic regulations in the history of New York" at 7:00 in the evening, changing the route through Times Square to northbound only on Broadway and on Seventh Avenue for five hours each night. The new routing affected 40,000 automobiles that traveled through the square during the hours that theaters operated.
- Born:
  - Jean, Grand Duke of Luxembourg, monarch and head of state of Luxembourg from 1964 until his abdication in 2000, son of Grand Duchess Charlotte; in Colmar-Berg (d. 2019)
  - Friedrich Dürrenmatt, Swiss author and dramatist; in Konolfingen (d. 1990)

== January 6, 1921 (Thursday) ==
- The First Battle of İnönü began, marking the first clash between the newly organized Army of the Grand National Assembly against Greek troops in the Greco-Turkish War.
- Rufus Isaacs, Lord Reading was appointed as the new Governor-General of India.
- A special committee of the U.S. House of Representatives voted, 10 to 4, to raise the number of U.S. Representatives from 435 to 483 and to set a permanent limit of no more than 500 members of the House.
- Racist protestors in Harlingen, Texas, drove out two Japanese families who had recently purchased farmland for cultivation.
- Born: Marianne Grunberg-Manago, Russian-French biochemist and academic; in Petrograd, Soviet Union (present-day St Petersburg, Russia) (d. 2013)

== January 7, 1921 (Friday) ==
Central Lithuania

- The Republic of Central Lithuania, a puppet state financed by Poland around the rebellion of Lucjan Żeligowski, was established with a capital in Vilnius under Żeligowski's rule. Poland annexed the area a little less than 18 months later, on March 24, 1922. On October 12, 1920, Żeligowski announced the creation of a provisional government. Soon the courts and the police were formed by his decree of January 7, 1921, and the civil rights of Central Lithuania were granted to all people who lived in the area on January 1, 1919.

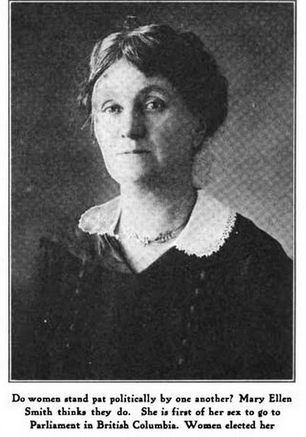
Speaker Smith

- The British Columbia House of Assembly elected Mary Ellen Smith of Vancouver as Speaker of the Assembly, the first woman legislative leader in North America and in the British Empire.

== January 8, 1921 (Saturday) ==
- Walker D. Hines, the American arbitrator who had been selected by the Allies to make rulings concerning the disbursement of German munitions, assigned 13½ percent of Germany's Rhine river fleet of barges and tugs to France.
- U.S. Navy Lieutenant Warren H. Langdon was shot by a Japanese sentry in Vladivostok, part of the area of Russia occupied by American and Japanese troops during the Bolshevik Revolution.
- Died: Béatrice La Palme, 42, Canadian singer and musician (b. 1878)

== January 9, 1921 (Sunday) ==
- Elections were held for the 96 seats of the Senate of France, and the Radicals and Radical Socialists received a plurality with 43 seats, followed by the Republicans with 39. Former President Paul Deschanel was elected as a Senator.
- The United Kingdom returned the colors of the Royal American Regiment, which had existed from 1756 to 1783 as the only British Army regiment to be recruited from American colonial subjects, with the regimental insignia to be hung at the chapel at Governors Island in New York.
- Born: Ágnes Keleti, Hungarian gymnast, five-time Olympic gold medalist, won four gold medals in the 1956 Summer Olympics; as Ágnes Klein, in Budapest, Kingdom of Hungary (d. 2025)
- Died: Rafael Antonio Gutiérrez, 75, President of El Salvador from 1894 to 1898 (b. 1845)

== January 10, 1921 (Monday) ==
- Petroleum production in Arkansas began when the Busey Well No. 1 was completed. The region's oil production, especially in El Dorado and Smackover expanded into a large part of the Arkansas economy.
- Dr. Miguel Gastão da Cunha, Brazil's Ambassador to France, was designated as the new President of the eight-member Council of the League of Nations. Similar to the United Nations Security Council 25 years later, the League Council served as an executive body for the LON and was composed of four permanent member nations (the United Kingdom, France, Italy and Japan) and four non-permanent members selected by the League Assembly every three years. The first of the non-permanent members were Belgium, Brazil, Greece and Spain.
- The certification of the Electoral College votes was made in the Senate, and outgoing U.S. Vice President Thomas R. Marshall formally announced the election of Warren G. Harding and Calvin Coolidge to the presidency and vice-presidency.
- A small fire at the U.S. Department of Commerce destroyed records from previous United States decennial census surveys, but did not affect the 1920 records.
- Corporations across New England announced drastic wage cuts for their employees, ranging from 20% to 25%, and including a 22½% decrease for textile workers.
- Born:
  - James Pitts, American chemist and pioneer in research on air pollution; in Salt Lake City, Utah (d. 2014)
  - Mazola Holman McKerson, American politician, first African American woman to serve as the mayor of a U.S. city of at least 30,000 people, mayor of Ardmore, Oklahoma from 1979 to 1983; as Mazola Holman, in Bluff, Oklahoma (d. 2014)

== January 11, 1921 (Tuesday) ==
- Riots in towns near Allahabad in British India, over land occupation rights and seniority, reached the point where troops were called in from Lucknow.
- The Battle of İnönü ended after five days with a retreat by the Greek forces from the Turkish Army defenders. The Turks suffered 95 deaths and the Greeks 51 deaths.
- The United States formally withdrew from further participation in the Allied Council, as U.S. Ambassador to France Hugh Wallace announced the severance of U.S. participation in all European councils.
- Born:
  - Kathleen Byron, English actress; as Kathleen Elizabeth Fell, in Manor Park (d. 2009)
  - Juanita M. Kreps, American economist, first woman to serve as the United States Secretary of Commerce from 1977 to 1979; as Clara Juanita Morris, in Lynch, Kentucky (d. 2010)

== January 12, 1921 (Wednesday) ==
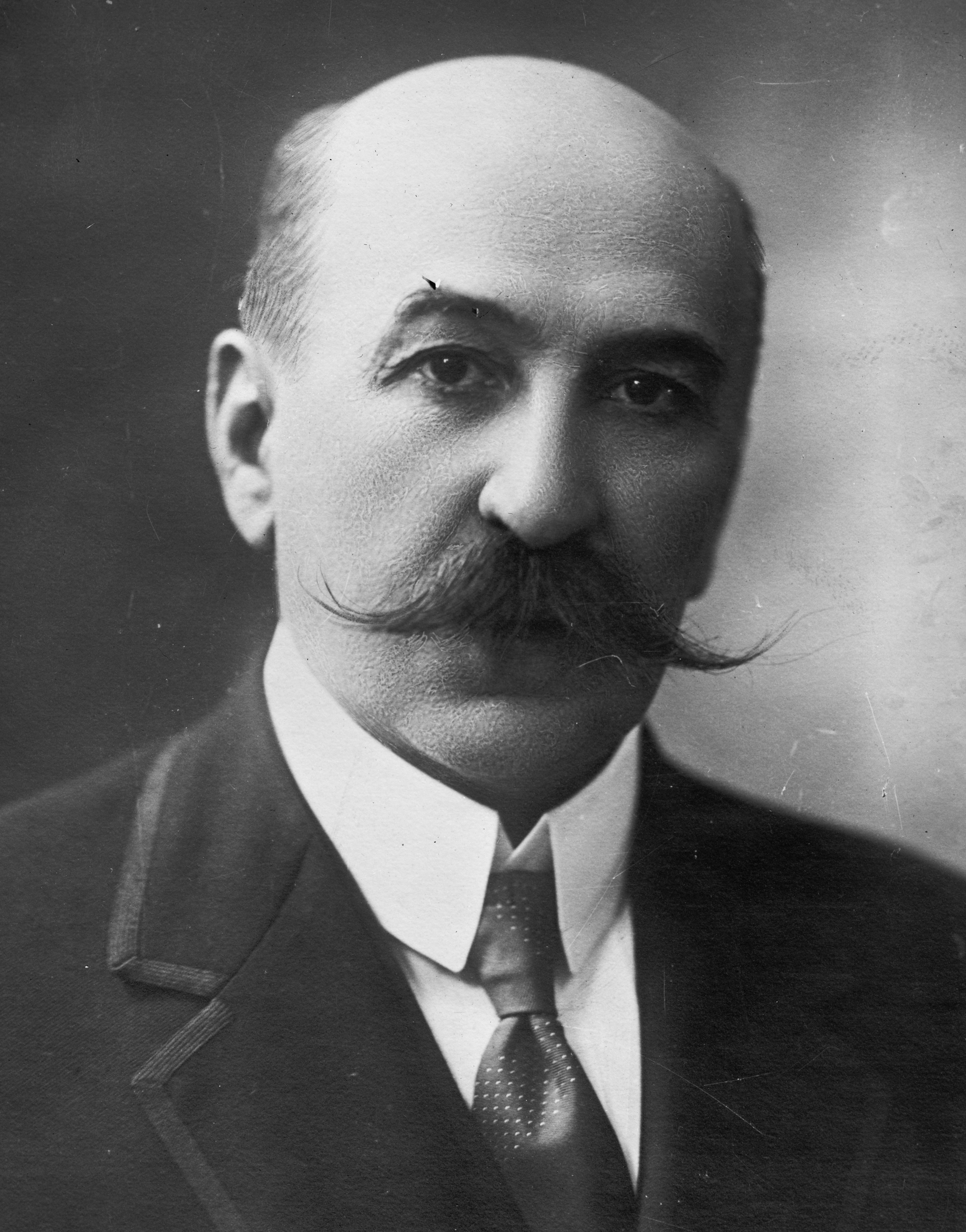
Premier Georges Leygues

- France's Premier Georges Leygues and his government lost a vote of no confidence held in the National Assembly, by a margin of 463 to 125 expressing their dissatisfaction with his failure to enforce reparations from Germany.

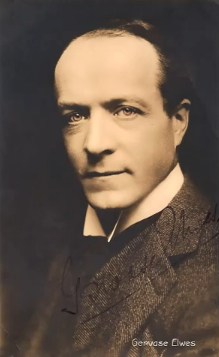
Gervase Elwes

- Died: Gervase Elwes, 54, English musical tenor; killed after being struck by a train in Boston while on a concert tour of the United States (b. 1866)

== January 13, 1921 (Thursday) ==
- The first of the new Indian Councils, giving limited advisory by natives of India in the administration of British India, was inaugurated at Madras by Prince Arthur, Duke of Connaught and Strathearn, former Governor General of Canada and the uncle of King George V.
- Died: Baron Ijuin Gorō, 68, commander-in-chief of the Imperial Japanese Navy during World War I (b. 1852)

== January 14, 1921 (Friday) ==
- In a bout for the world lightweight boxing championship, held before 12,000 spectators at Madison Square Garden in New York, defending champion Benny Leonard retained his title even after almost being counted out in the first round. Felled by challenger Ritchie Mitchell in the first round. Leonard came within one second of being counted out as referee Johnny Houkup reached nine, before getting back up and knocking Mitchell down for the count of nine, getting back up, then twice more before the end of the round. Mitchell was knocked down again by Leonard for the count of nine in the sixth round, and again got back up. After knocking down Mitchell twice more, Leonard was given the win as the referee ended the fight.
- Born: Murray Bookchin, American environmentalist and pioneer in the ecology movement; in New York City (d. 2006)

== January 15, 1921 (Saturday) ==
- Mitsubishi Electric, the future multinational electronics business, was created as a separate corporation spun off from the Mitsubishi Heavy Industries shipyard in Japan.

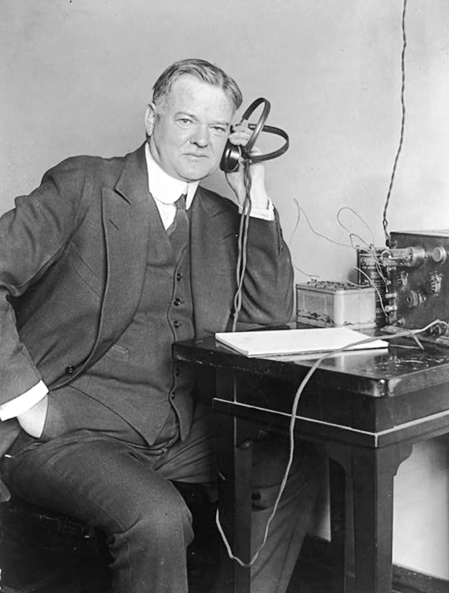
U.S. Secretary of Commerce Herbert Hoover

- The first live radio broadcast of a public address from a remote location took place as incoming U.S. Secretary of Commerce Herbert Hoover gave a speech about humanitarian aid to Europe. The speech was made at the Duquesne Club in Pittsburgh and relayed by telephone line to radio station KDKA, ten miles away. According to KDKA's owner, the broadcast would be strong enough to be picked up by amateur radio operators up to 1,000 miles (1,600 km) away on wavelength of 330 meters (equivalent to the 910 kHz frequency on AM radio).

== January 16, 1921 (Sunday) ==
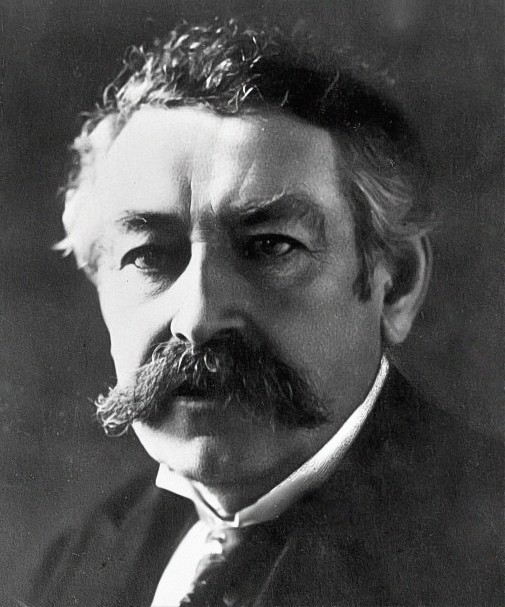
Premier Aristide Briand

- Aristide Briand formed a new government of France, presenting the President with a list of cabinet ministers with himself as the Prime Minister as an alternative to reappointing Raymond Poincare.
- With the departure of Gabriele d'Annunzio, General Caviglia of the Italian Army ended the blockade of Fiume.

== January 17, 1921 (Monday) ==
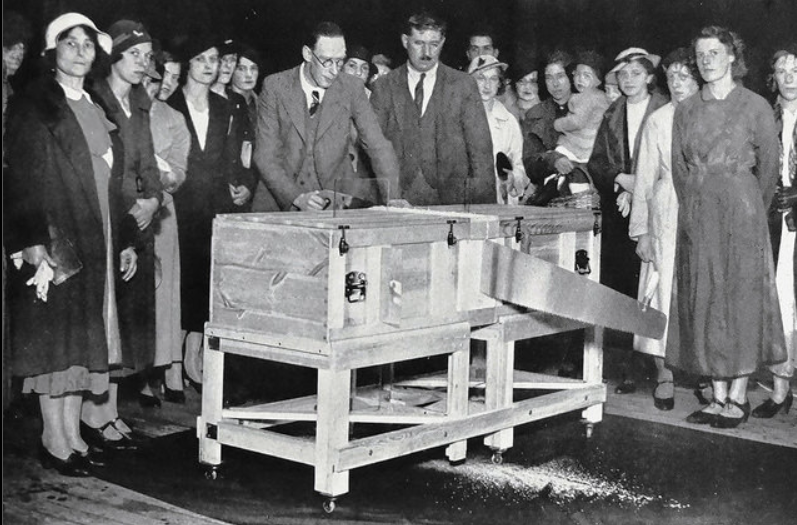
P. T. Selbit demonstrating sawing a woman in half trick in 1937

- The illusion of "sawing a woman in half" was given its first public performance, as English magician P. T. Selbit demonstrated the trick at the theatre at Finsbury Park in Harringay in London.
- A joint resolution passed Congress urging the U.S. Secretary of War to cease recruiting for the Army until the number of troops could be reduced from 224,000 to a target of 175,000. The measure passed the Senate, 41-32 and the House, 285 to 4.
- In Denver, Internal Revenue officers arrested the leader of a drug ring that operated in 22 of the 48 states and had revenues of over one million dollars.
- Winston Churchill, Britain's War Minister during World War One, accepted the peacetime job of Secretary of State for the Colonies.

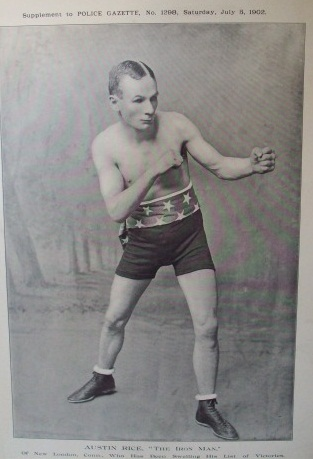
Austin Rice

- Born: Mohammad Asghar Khan, Pakistani military officer and businessman, commander-in-chief of the Pakistan Air Force from 1957 to 1964, president of Pakistan International Airlines; in Jammu, Jammu and Kashmir (princely state), British India (present-day Jammu and Kashmir) (d. 2018)
- Died: Austin Rice, 48, American boxer and perennial contender for the world featherweight title; died of injuries sustained after he was run over by a horse-drawn wagon (b. 1872)

== January 18, 1921 (Tuesday) ==
- A robbery at Chicago's busiest railroad terminal, Union Station, netted $462,000 worth of bonds and cash taken from a mail train. The week before, at Mount Vernon thieves took $197,000 in currency from another train. Gangsters Frank Rio, Robert O'Neill and Thomas Dyer were arrested in October on suspicion of carrying out the robbery which took place shortly after midnight in front of numerous potential witnesses, but were later acquitted. Rio would continue to avoid prison sentences during his lifetime, dying in 1935.
- Iran's Prime Minister Fathollah Khan Akbar withdrew his resignation after pressure from Iranian business leaders. Thirty-four days later, Fathollah was deposed in a coup d'état along with the Shah, Ahmad Shah Qajar.
- Born:
  - Yoichiro Nambu, Japanese-born American theoretical physicist, 2008 Nobel Prize in Physics laureate for his 1960 discovery of spontaneous symmetry breaking; in Tokyo, Empire of Japan (d. 2015)
  - Alexander H. Flax, American aeronautical engineer, Chief Scientist of the U.S. Air Force from 1959 to 1961, Director of the National Reconnaissance Office during the Cold War; in Brooklyn (d. 1969)
- Died: Adolf von Hildebrand, 73, German sculptor (b. 1847)

== January 19, 1921 (Wednesday) ==
- A treaty to merge the nations of El Salvador, Guatemala, Honduras and Costa Rica into a single republic, the United Provinces of Central America (Provincias Unidas de Centroamérica) was signed in San José, Costa Rica. The attempt to recreate the Federal Republic of Central America, that had existed from 1823 to 1841 before breaking into five nations, did not include Nicaragua and would not go further than the selection of a provisional council of delegates from each state, and none of the signatories ever ratified the treaty.
- The U.S. House of Representatives overwhelmingly rejected the Reapportionment Bill that called for the number of U.S. representatives to be increased from 435 to 483. With the number of representatives remaining at 435, each Congressional district would now represent an average of 242,267 people rather than the 1912 number of one for every 218,979.
- Born: Patricia Highsmith, American novelist of psychological thrillers, known for the Tom Ripley series; as Mary Patricia Plangman, in Fort Worth, Texas (d. 1995)

== January 20, 1921 (Thursday) ==
- All 56 Royal Navy sailors and officers on the British submarine HMS K5 died when the K-class submarine sank in the English Channel.
- The first constitution of modern Turkey was ratified by the Grand National Assembly, with executive power delegated to the Chairman of the Assembly and a Council of Ministers under the direction of the Assembly. The 1921 constitution lasted for three years until superseded by the Constitution of the Republic of Turkey.
- The Dagestan Autonomous Soviet Socialist Republic (Dagestan ASSR) was created by the Soviet Union on the Caspian Sea coast, with a capital at Makhachkala. The ASSR would exist until the fall of the Soviet Union in 1991, and is now administered as a federal subject of Russia.
- The Mountain Autonomous Soviet Socialist Republic (Gorskaya ASSR) was formed by the Soviet Union as territory within the Northern Caucasus Mountains providing limited self government within the Russian SFSR for persons indigenous to region. Over a period of less than four years, the Russian government split the ASSR into various districts.
- Died: Živojin Mišić, 65, Serbian field marshal, most decorated Serbian military officer in history. died of lung cancer (b. 1855)

== January 21, 1921 (Friday) ==
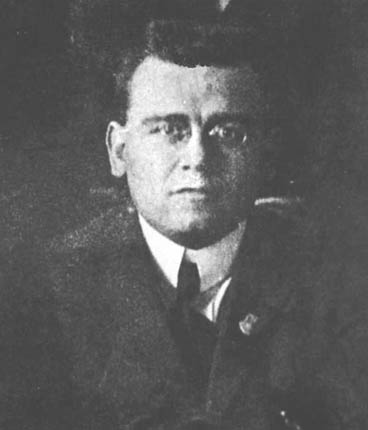
Amadeo Bordiga

- The full-length silent comedy-drama film The Kid, written, produced, directed by and starring Charlie Chaplin (in his Tramp character), with Jackie Coogan was premiered, making its first public showing at Carnegie Hall in New York before being distributed throughout North America and then the world.
- The Italian Communist Party (PCI) was founded in Livorno, splitting from the Socialist Party after the delegates at the Socialist Party convention voted against joining the Moscow Internationale. The vote taken, based on the number of party members represented by each delegate, was 58,900 for joining Moscow, and 112,241 against. Amadeo Bordiga reportedly announced, "We who are in the minority are not going to accept this vote.... Therefore, we announce that the Communists will leave this hall and congregate in St. Mark's Theatre, where a new Communist party will be formed. Hurrah for the Communists!"
- The French Chamber of Deputies approved Aristide Briand as the new premier by a vote of 475 to 68, in response to his more moderate policy regarding German reparations.
- The Irish Republican Army attempted an ambush on Dublin police officers in Drumcondra, a district of Dublin. The attack was unsuccessful; one of the IRA members was fatally wounded, and five were captured and sent to Mountjoy Prison. Six of them, led by Patrick Doyle, were executed by hanging on March 14 after being convicted of treason by a military tribunal.
- Born:
  - Andreas Ostler, German Olympic bobsledder; in Bavaria, Weimar Republic (d. 1988)
  - Howard Unruh, American mass murderer who killed 13 people in less than 15 minutes in 1949; in Camden, New Jersey (d. 2009)
- Died:
  - Arthur Sifton, 62, Canadian politician, second Premier of Alberta, 20th Secretary of State for Canada (b. 1858)
  - Charles F. Booher, 72, American politician, U.S. Representative for Missouri from 1889 until his death; died six weeks before the scheduled March 4 expiration of his term (b. 1848)

== January 22, 1921 (Saturday) ==
- The Soviet government announced, in Pravda, an immediate one-third reduction in the daily ration of bread for cities, in the middle of winter during an ongoing famine prompted by a drought and poor grain harvest in 1920. "Severe though it was," a historian would note later, "the reduction apparently was unavoidable. Heavy snows and shortages of fuel had held up food trains from Siberia and the northern Caucasus, where surpluses had been gathered to feed the hungry towns of the center and north." The unpopular decision led to protests in cities throughout the Soviet Union, the most prominent of which would be the Kronstadt rebellion in March.

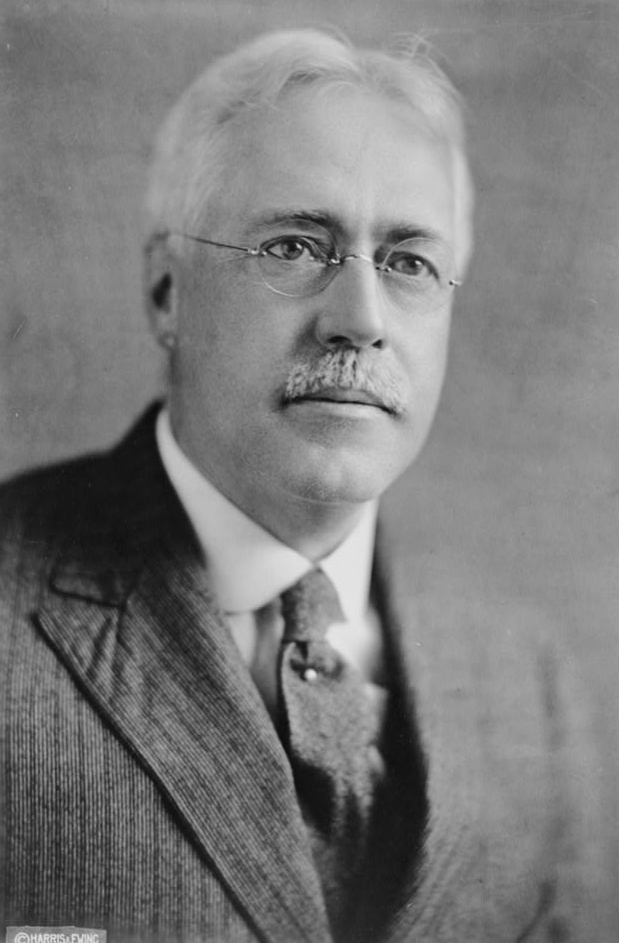
Frank A. Vanderlip

- The formation of the Council on Foreign Relations was proposed by Frank A. Vanderlip, formerly the Assistant U.S. Secretary of Treasury for President McKinley, and later the President of the National City Bank of New York (now Citibank). Vanderlip spoke in New York City at a meeting of the League for Political Education, and described a body of 30 American business and political leaders who would "direct American intercourse with foreign nations" as well as being a watchdog over the U.S. Department of State. Vanderlip envisioned that the Council would eventually take over the functions of the U.S. Senate in making treaties.
- The Allied Reparations Commission provided a detailed report of German deliveries of reparations made in 1920.

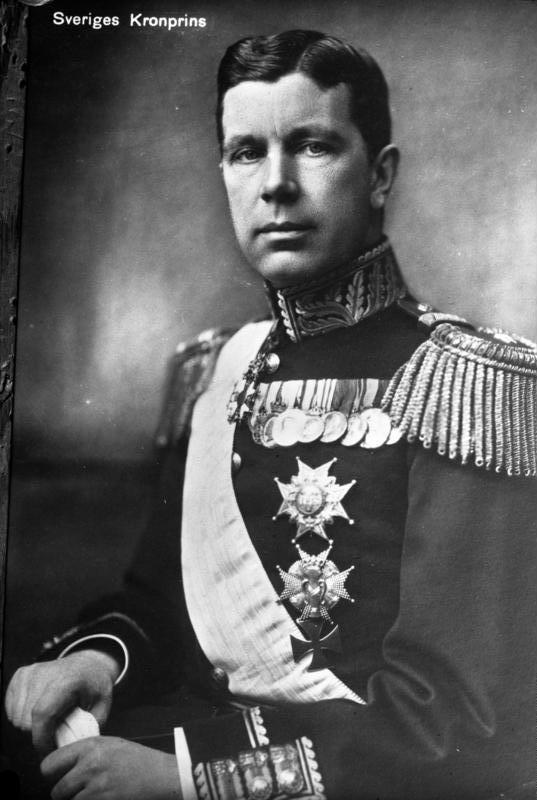
Prince Gustaf

- Sweden's Crown Prince Gustaf who would later reign from 1950 to 1973 as King Gustaf VI Adolf, saved the life of a British sailor in Stockholm's harbor. The man, not otherwise identified, had fallen into deep waters from a vessel that was in port, and Prince Gustaf saw the man in danger of drowning.

== January 23, 1921 (Sunday) ==
- The Akron Pros, defending champions of the NFL's forerunner, the American Professional Football Association, played a postseason game in Los Angeles against the Conn's All-Stars and won, 21 to 7.
- The small town of Killen, Alabama was reportedly destroyed by a fire that burned down Killen's five stores, its three lodge halls and its post office.
- Born:
  - Marija Gimbutas, Lithuanian-born American anthropologist who formulated the Kurgan hypothesis that the Indo-European language group and its original speakers had their origin north of the Black Sea; as Marija Birutė Alseikaitė, in Vilnius, Republic of Central Lithuania (d. 1994)
  - Leo Major, U.S.-born Canadian Army hero, one of only three soldiers in the British Commonwealth to receive the Distinguished Conduct Medal for heroism in two separate wars (World War II and the Korean War); in New Bedford, Massachusetts (d. 2008)
- Died:
  - Heinrich Wilhelm Gottfried von Waldeyer-Hartz, 84, German anatomist and author of the neuron doctrine who coined the terms chromosome and neuron, the Waldeyer's ring is named in his honor (b. 1836)
  - Mykola Leontovych, 43, Ukrainian musical composer specializing in a cappella choral music; murdered by a Cheka agent (b. 1877)

== January 24, 1921 (Monday) ==
- An assault by land and air from British forces on Somaliland against the "Mad Mullah," Mohammed Abdullah Hassan, captured or killed most of the leaders. The Mullah himself was thought to have escaped, but had actually died a month earlier.
- The U.S. Department of State deported Ludwig C.A.K. Martens, who had purported to represent the Soviet Union as an unrecognized Ambassador.
- A lynch mob in Warrenton, North Carolina broke into the Warren County Jail and forcibly removed and murdered two of the 13 African-Americans arrested in a race riot the day before, which had injured five white and three black people. The two men identified by the mob leaders as the instigators of the riot, Alfred Williams and Plummer Bullock, were taken into a forest one mile outside of town and "riddled with bullets."
- Born: Beatrice Mintz, American embryologist and genetic engineer; in New York City (d. 2022)

== January 25, 1921 (Tuesday) ==
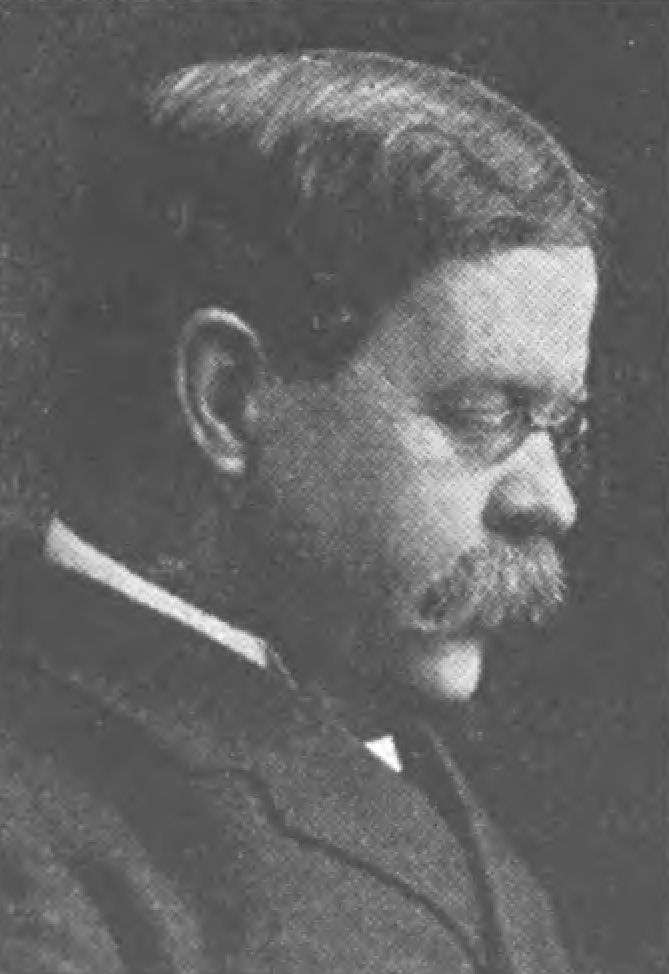
Dr. Sedgwick

- Karel Čapek's popular science-fiction play R.U.R. premiered in Prague in Czechoslovakia and introduced a new word, robot, to the languages of the world. "R.U.R." was "Rossumovi Univerzální Roboti", the name of the company, described in the opening exposition as having been created by Dr. Rossum to build artificial servants. Rendered in English as "Rossum's Universal Robots," R.U.R. was translated by Paul Selver for performance in the United States by New York's Theatre Guild at the Garrick Theatre. The Guild noted that "Rossum's Universal Robots" was "best translated as 'Knowall's Universal Hands'." A literary critic would note later, "Before R.U.R., artificially created anthropoids, like Frankenstein's monster or modern versions of the Jewish legend of the golem, might have acted destructively on a small scale; but Čapek seems to have been the first to see robots as an extension of the Industrial Revolution, and hence to grant them a reach capable of global transformation. Though his robots are closer to what we now might call androids, only a pedant would refuse Čapek honors as the father of the robot apocalypse.
- The U.S. freighter SS Hewitt, at sea since its departure from Port Arthur, Texas on January 20, was last seen about 250 nautical miles (460 km; 290 mi) off of the coast of Florida after making its last regular radio call. All 42 of its crew were lost.
- Born: Josef Holeček, Czech Olympic canoe rower, gold medalist at the 1948 and the 1952 Olympics; in Říčany (now in the Czech Republic) (d. 2005)
- Died: William T. Sedgwick, 65, American epidemiologist and reformer of public health services in the United States (b. 1855)

== January 26, 1921 (Wednesday) ==
- Women won the right to vote in Sweden with an amendment to the law passed by its parliament, the Riksdag. Women would first be able to exercise their new right on September 10 in the parliamentary elections.
- The five Allied nations of the Supreme War Council, victors in World War One, gave diplomatic recognition to the Republic of Estonia and to the Republic of Latvia. The U.S. would follow in 1922, along with other nations.
- The collision of two trains killed 17 people near the Welsh village of Abermule. On the Cambrian Railway, the northeast-bound express train from Aberystwyth to Shrewsbury was on the same single line track as the southwest-bound local train from Welshpool to Aberystwyth when the two struck each other at 12:30 in the afternoon.
- Convicted murderer Henry Lowery, an African-American, was kidnapped from a train taking him to the Texas State Penitentiary, then tortured and burned to death in a lynching so gruesome that the Governor of Arkansas called it "the most disreputable act ever committed in Arkansas." A mob of 25 men in "six high-powered automobiles," waited for the train to stop at the train station in Sardis, Mississippi, overpowered two sheriff's deputies transporting Lowery, then drove him to Nodena, Arkansas. According to reports, Lowrey was chained to a log and covered with brush, and "It was forty minutes before the last death agony died away and the negro's charred body lay still in death." Lowrey's captors repeatedly turned him over and added oil to the pyre "to hasten the burning."
- In a National Hockey League game in Montreal, the original Ottawa Senators left their match with the Montreal Canadiens with a little more than five minutes to play, as a protest against the officiating of referee Cooper Smeaton. As the Ottawa players departed, Smeaton allowed the game continue for a little longer with only the six Canadiens facing a goal with no goaltender or defenders, and allowed Newsy Lalonde and Amos Arbour to make two additional scores before sounding the gong to end the action. The Senators, who would go on to win the Stanley Cup at season's end, were fined $500.
- Born:
  - Eddie Barclay, French record producer for Blue Star Records and owner of the Eddie's Club nightclub; as Édouard Ruault, in Paris (d. 2005)
  - Elisabeth Kirkby, English-born Australian TV actress, earned a Ph.D. at the age of 93; in Bolton, Lancashire (d. 2026)

== January 27, 1921 (Thursday) ==
- District Attorney Whitman of New York City announced indictments of the 13 member "auto squad," 12 men and a woman who had committed insurance fraud by accepting 9,000 stolen automobiles and then turning them in for recovery awards from insurance companies.
- Born: Donna Reed, American actress, Academy Award winner for From Here to Eternity, co-star of It's a Wonderful Life, and star of The Donna Reed Show from 1958 to 1966; as Donna Belle Mullenger, in Denison, Iowa (d. 1986)
- Died:
  - Frances McEwen Belford, 82, American activist who successfully lobbied for the first coast-to-coast interstate highway in the United States, and dubbed the "Mother of the Lincoln Highway" (b. 1839)
  - Justiniano Borgoño, 84, Peruvian politician, served as Prime Minister of Peru for two months in 1891, and then as the caretaker President of Peru as chairman of a junta for four months in 1894 (b. 1836)

== January 28, 1921 (Friday) ==
- The Supreme War Council of the European Allied victors in World War One met at Paris and adjusted the total reparations that Germany would have to pay under the Treaty of Versailles, in addition to a 42-year tax of German exports at the rate of 12½% ad valorem, and providing a variable amount of annuities owed, with a range of two billion to six billion Deutschmarks in gold between 1921 and May 1, 1963. Under the plan, Germany would pay two billion per year for the first five years, four billion annually from 1926 to 1930, and six billion per year from 1931 to 1963, a total of 222 billion gold marks (equivalent at the time to $55,500,000,000 in U.S. dollars).
- Dr. Robert W. Wood of Johns Hopkins University gave the first demonstration of his invention of a lamp that used filters to eliminate visible light while projecting ultraviolet UV-A light. More commonly referred to as "black light", the lamp revealed chemicals not readily detectable in ordinary light. As a result, Dr. Wood referred to his creation as the "chemical eye."
- R-34, the first aircraft to cross the Atlantic Ocean, was destroyed by heavy winds after its arrival at the Royal Naval Air Station at Howden in East Yorkshire. The British dirigible was one of the United Kingdom's most expensive aircraft, valued at £250,000 equivalent to 12.3 million pounds sterling (or $15.8 million U.S. dollars) today.

== January 29, 1921 (Saturday) ==
- The U.S. state of Washington was struck by the Great Olympic Blowdown, the most powerful storm in the state's history up to that time. The high winds swept from the Pacific Ocean across the Olympic Peninsula and caused damage as far east as Walla Walla. Although only two people were killed, the winds of up to 113 miles per hour (182 km/h) knocked down millions of trees, including over 40% of those growing on the southwest side of the Olympic Mountains. Hundreds of farm animals were killed by the flying debris, and the small community of La Push, Washington had 16 homes destroyed.
- The Allied Council relinquished some of its financial claims against the former Austro-Hungarian Empire.
- The New York Yankees baseball team announced that it would construct its own stadium in the Bronx, no longer sharing Manhattan's Polo Grounds with the New York Giants baseball team. The plan was to build Yankee Stadium on the site of the Hebrew Orphan Asylum, bounded by Broadway, Hamilton Place, 138th Street and 136th Street, with construction to begin in June (though the plan was later changed, and the stadium built on the site of a lumberyard purchased from William Waldorf Astor).
- The Supreme Court of France reversed the convictions of six French soldiers who had been wrongfully convicted of desertion and executed in 1914, and awarded a lifetime pension of 2,000 French francs per year to their widows, as well as 1,000 francs to their minor children. Their commanding officer, a French Army lieutenant, later admitted that he had given the men the order to retreat and had denied it during their trial.
- Born: Mustafa Ben Halim, Egyptian-born Libyan politician, Prime Minister of Libya serving King Idris from 1954 to 1957; in Alexandria, Sultanate of Egypt (d. 2021)
- Died: Alfred Tredway White, 74, American philanthropist and housing reformer who built quality low-income apartment buildings to replace tenements in Brooklyn during the late 19th century; drowned after falling through thin ice while skating (b. 1846)

== January 30, 1921 (Sunday) ==
- Twelve guests— six men and six women— died in a fire at the Colonial Hotel in Hoboken, New Jersey, United States; three others were seriously injured. The fire was caused by another guest who left a lit cigar smoldering in his room when he went out. The cigar set fire to drapery, and the flames then spread to other rooms.
- Died: John Francis Murphy, 67, American landscape painter; died of pneumonia (b. 1853)

== January 31, 1921 (Monday) ==
- The commercial sailing cargo schooner Carroll A. Deering was found after it had run aground off of the coast of Cape Hatteras, North Carolina in choppy waters, but none of its crew of 10 people were ever seen again. The last communication from the Deering had been on January 28 when it attempted to hail a light ship, and was spotted on January 29 moving toward the Diamond Shoals. The only living thing on board was the ship's mascot, a parrot. When the U.S. Coast Guard was finally able to board the ship on February 4, investigators found that both of the ship's lifeboats had been taken down and evidence that the evacuation had happened quickly. The fate of the Carroll A. Deering has remained a mystery for almost a century.
- With less than five weeks left in his term, U.S. President Woodrow Wilson announced that he would not commute the prison sentence of Socialist Party leader Eugene V. Debs, despite the recommendations of Wilson's anti-Communist Attorney General, A. Mitchell Palmer to release Debs on February 12 for Lincoln's birthday. Debs had slightly less than five years remaining of a 10-year prison sentence for espionage and was incarcerated at the U.S. Penitentiary in Atlanta.
- Born:
  - Carol Channing, American stage and film actress and singer, winner of the 1964 Tony Award for Hello, Dolly!; in Seattle (d. 2019)
  - Mario Lanza, American opera tenor, singer and film actor; as Alfredo Arnold Cocozza in Philadelphia (d. 1959)
  - Abu Sayeed Chowdhury, President of Bangladesh 1972 to 1973; in Kalihati Upazila, Bengal Province, British India (d. 1987)
- Died: Frederic Hale Parkhurst, 56, Governor of Maine, of pneumonia, 26 days after his inauguration. Parkhurst became ill after winning the general election in September. The president pro tempore of the Maine Senate, Percival P. Baxter, served the remaining 3 years and 11 months of Parkhurst's term.
