= Boris Batursky =

Russian social democrat and trade union activist

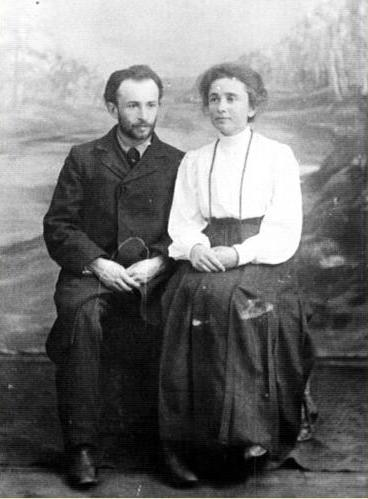
- Batursky with his wife
- Born: 1 January 1879; Nizhny Novgorod, Nizhny Novgorod Governorate, Russian Empire
- Died: 5 December 1920 (aged 41); Vitebsk, Vitebsk Governorate, Russian SFSR
- Spouse: Flora Grigoryevna Gertsenberg

Boris Solomonovich Batursky (Russian: Борис Соломонович Батурский; 1 January 1879 – 5 December 1920) was a Russian social democrat and trade union activist. He was also a writer.

== Early life ==
Batursky was born Boris Solomonovich Tsetlin into a Jewish family in Vitebsk. He was educated as a lawyer. He was a social democrat and a member of the Russian Social Democratic Labour Party (RSDLP) from 1900. He was a member of the Central Committee of the RSDLP and a member of the All-Union Central Council of Trade Unions. During World War I, he was a member of the Organizational Committee of the RSDLP. During this time, his views changed from protectionism to internationalism. He was part of the Mensheviks. He took part in working to solve the workers problems at the All-Russian Meeting of Soviets of Workers 'and Soldiers' Deputies. He was a member of the Council of the Russian Republic, which the Bolsheviks called "a criminal adventure".

== After the October Revolution ==
On 2 November 1917, he withdrew from the Central Committee of the RSDLP together with another 13 members due to a majority decision to enter into negotiations with the Bolsheviks, but soon returned to the Central Committee after the termination of negotiations on 10 November. He was one of the founders of the Menshevik club, The Worker's Banner. He also supported Alexander Potresov, who considered it permissible to use any means to overthrow the Smolny Autocrats (Bolsheviks).

In January 1918, he was sent as a delegate of the First All-Russian Congress of Trade Unions by the Samara Union of Trade and Industrial Employees. He founded the group Unity and Independence for the Trade Union Movement, while he was already a member of various similar groups in Petrograd.

He criticized the center-left majority of the Central Committee of the RSDLP for reconciliation with the Bolsheviks. He then withdrew from party work and left for Vitebsk.

At the end of 1920, he was arrested by the Cheka in Vitebsk and imprisoned. He soon fell ill with typhus and was released from prison two days before his death. He died on 5 December 1920 in Vitebsk. On the day of his funeral, a strike and protest of workers took place.

== Family ==
Batursky had four brothers, all members of the RSDLP, and five sisters. He married Flora Grigoryevna, née Gertsenberg.

== See also ==
- Mensheviks
- Russian Social Democratic Labour Party
