= First All Russian Congress of Trade Unions =

The First All Russian Congress of Trade Unions took place in mid-January 1918. Following the Bolshevik seizure of state power, one of the key discussions was whether the trade unions should become "organs of governmental power".

Congress declared that:

Workers' control is inseparably connected with the general system of regulation of national economy, that it is the basis of state regulation, that the unions must carry out the idea of centralized workers' control and the merging of the small controlling units into larger organs which correspond to the modern methods of production as well as the actual structure of labor organizations.

Congress further resolved that:

The trade unions must give their entire support to the policy of the Socialist Soviet Government as conducted by the Council of People's Commissars.

Nevertheless Menshevik delegates repeatedly called an independent sphere of action for the unions.
