= John Botha =

South African rugby union player

- Full name: Johannes Augustus Botha
- Born: November 19, 1879 Cape Town, Cape Colony
- Died: December 8, 1920 (aged 41) Standerton, Transvaal, South Africa

Rugby union career
- Position: Lock
Provincial / State sides
Years	Team	Apps	(Points)
- Transvaal
International career
Years	Team	Apps	(Points)
1903	South Africa	1	

Johannes Augustus Botha (1879–1920) was a South African Springbok rugby player, who played as a lock.

== Personal ==
Botha was born to Johan and Johanna (Stegman) Botha on 19 November 1879 in Cape Town, Cape Colony. He was more commonly known as "John". After matriculating at Sea Point High School in Cape Town, Botha became a farmer and married Christina Fourie. He died on 8 December 1920 in Standerton, Transvaal, South Africa caused by a lightning bolt.

== Rugby ==
Botha played rugby for the clubs Hamiltons and Diggers, as well as for his province Transvaal and the Springboks. He made his only International South Africa test appearance on 12 September 1903, at Newlands in Cape Town, Cape Province, South Africa, playing as one of the locks. The game was between the Springboks and Great Britain. The Springboks won 8-0.
