= April 1921 =

Month of 1921

<<	April 1921					>>
Su	Mo	Tu	We	Th	Fr	Sa
					1	2
3	4	5	6	7	8	9
10	11	12	13	14	15	16
17	18	19	20	21	22	23
24	25	26	27	28	29	30

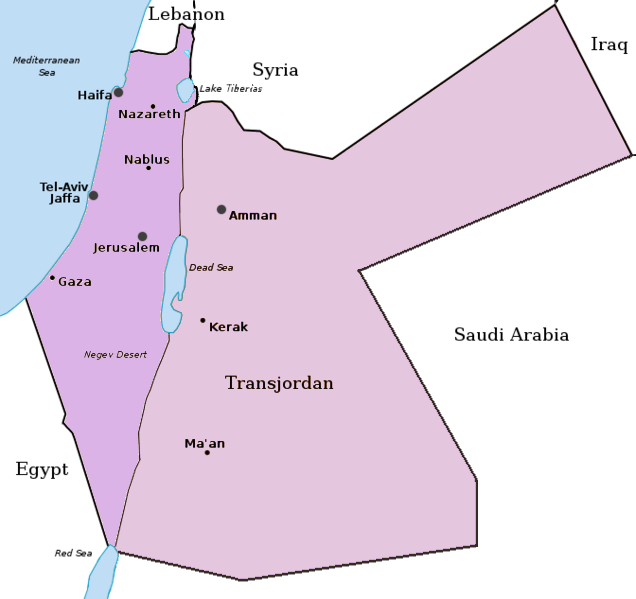
April 11, 1921: Britain creates Emirate of Transjordan east of Jordan River

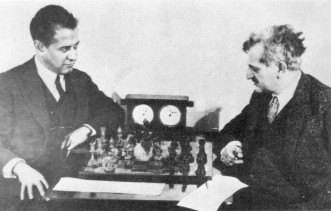
April 28, 1921: Capablanca defeats Lasker for World Chess Championship

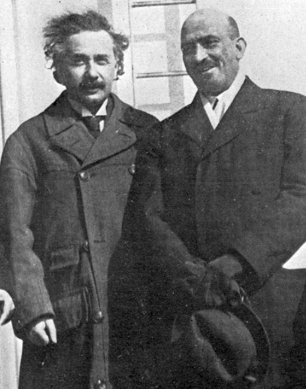
April 10, 1921: Physicist Albert Einstein and Zionist activist Chaim Weizmann arrive in New York to lobby for Jewish state

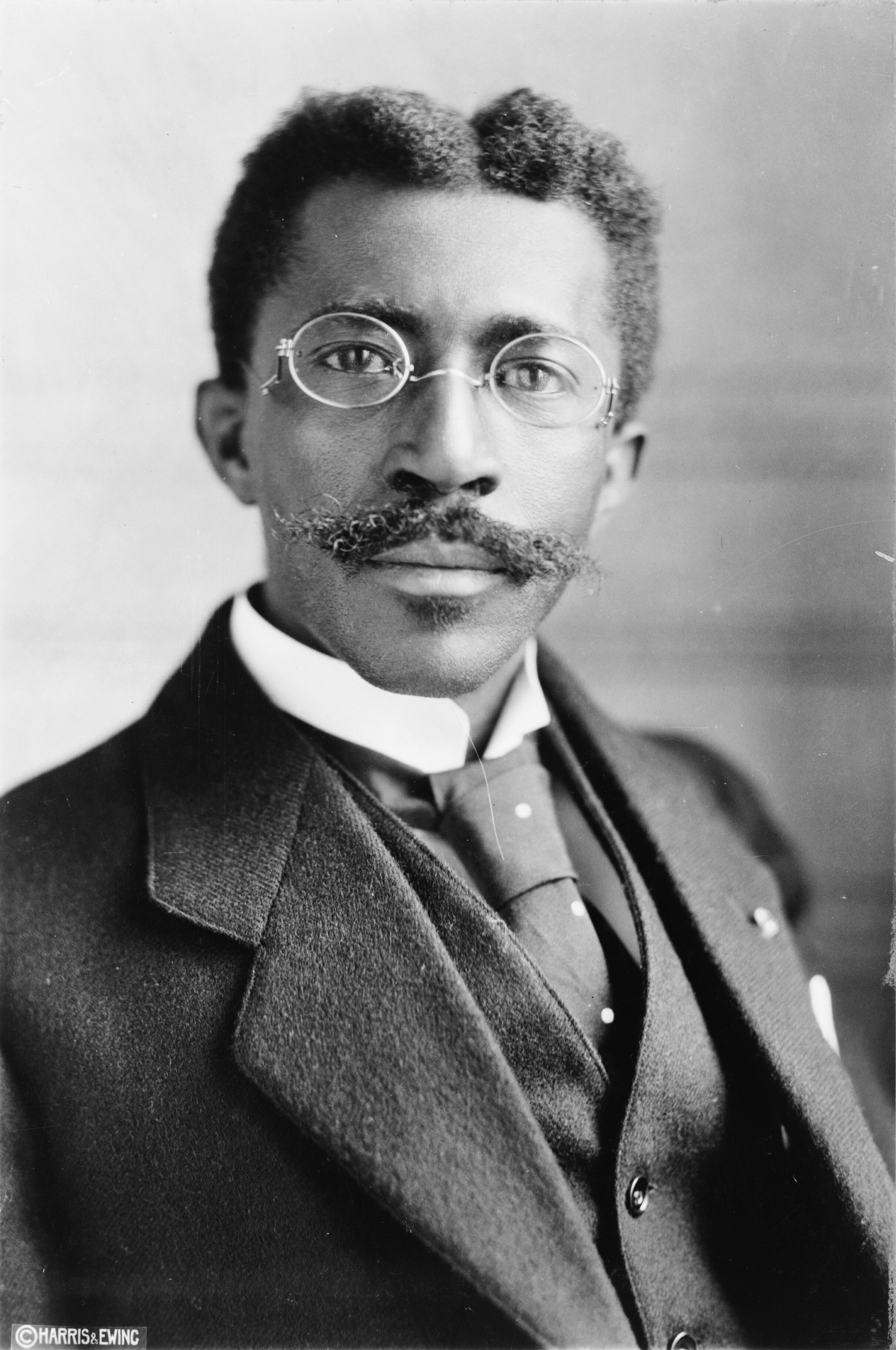
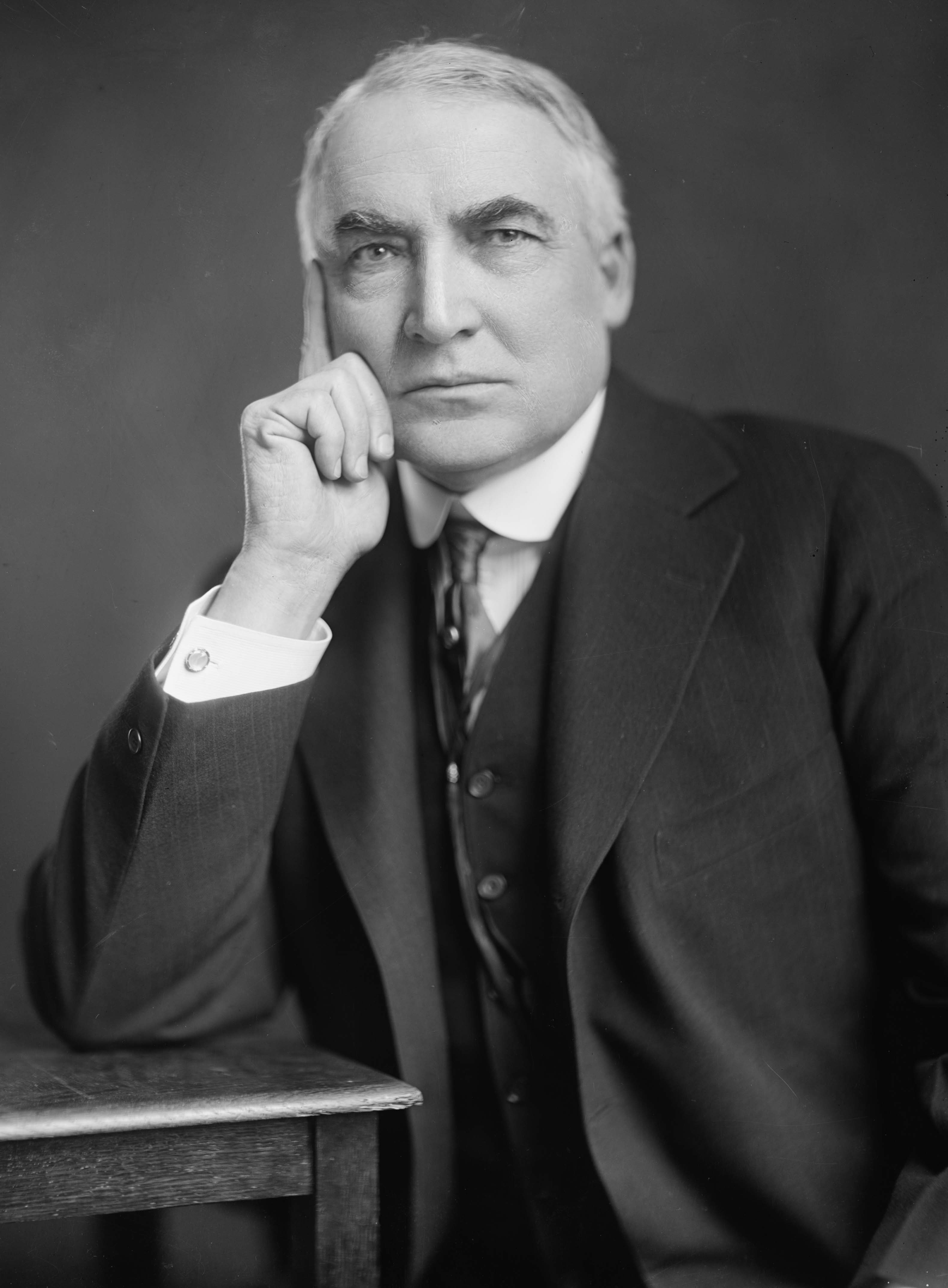
April 15, 1921: Liberian President King visits U.S. President Harding

The following events occurred in April 1921:

== April 1, 1921 (Friday) ==
- Eight people drowned in the sinking of the passenger ship SS Governor after it collided in the fog with the freighter SS West Harlland, but 232 others were safely rescued in the 20 minutes available before the ship sank.
- French pilot Adrienne Bolland made the first flight across the Andes by a woman, when she flew a Caudron G.3 from Mendoza, Argentina, to Santiago, Chile.
- Croatia's Republican Peasant Party launched the "Constitution of the Neutral Peasant Republic of Croatia".
- The lockout of striking coal miners in the United Kingdom began.
- An attempt to impeach Governor of Oklahoma J. B. Robertson failed when the state House of Representatives result was 42 for and 42 against, insufficient to pass the resolution for a trial.
- The cabinet of U.S. president Warren G. Harding issued a statement proclaiming that its members, individually, were in sympathy with the Allied Powers regarding Germany's indemnity payments.
- Born: Arthur "Guitar Boogie" Smith, American country musician; in Clinton, South Carolina(d. 2014)

== April 2, 1921 (Saturday) ==
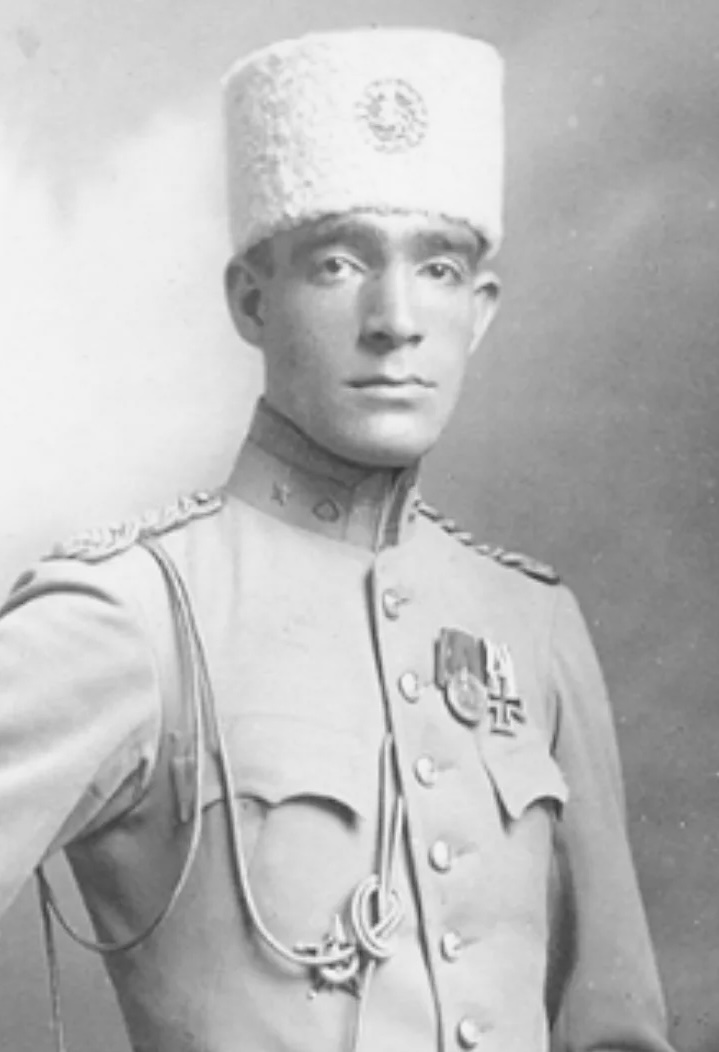
Colonel Mohammad Taqi Pessian

- The February Uprising in Armenia was suppressed by the Soviet Union, seven weeks after the Armenian Bolsheviks had been driven out by the Armenian Revolutionary Federation.
- Under the new Home Rule Act in Ireland, Lord Edmund Talbot was appointed as the final Lord Lieutenant of Ireland, succeeding Viscount French as the King's representative from Great Britain.
- Greece was forced to abandon Eskişehir after a counterattack by the Turks.
- The Autonomous Government of Khorasan was declared at Mashhad in Iran by Colonel Mohammad Taqi Pessian after Pessian overthrew the Iranian Governor, Ahmad Qavam. Six months later, Qavam, named the Prime Minister of Iran, would engineer the death of Pessian in a countercoup.

== April 3, 1921 (Sunday) ==
- Coal rationing began in the United Kingdom.
- The U.S. State Department announced the first "Pan-Pacific Educational Conference", to be held in Honolulu in August, inviting the representatives of all nations on the Pacific Ocean with the exception of the Soviet Union and Mexico.
- The German classic horror silent film, The Cabinet of Dr. Caligari, had its U.S. premiere with English-language dialogue cards at the Capitol Theatre in New York.
- Italian rider Costante Girardengo won the 14th Milan–San Remo cycle race.
- Died: Annie Louise Cary, 78, American opera contralto (b. 1842)

== April 4, 1921 (Monday) ==
- A census of the Commonwealth of Australia, taken overnight, gave a figure of 5,435,734 for the total population.
- Died: Edmund Cogswell Converse, 71, American financier (b. 1849)

== April 5, 1921 (Tuesday) ==
- Saad Zaghlul Pasha, who had agitated for Egypt's independence, returned from exile to an enthusiastic welcome.
- Charles, the last Emperor of Austria-Hungary, abandoned his attempt to reclaim his position as King Karoly IV of Hungary, after facing opposition from the Allied Council and from his former subjects in Czechoslovakia, along with a cold reception by his former Hungarian subjects.
- The "Russian Council" was set up as a government in exile for Russia by the Menshevik leaders who had been evacuated from the Crimea to Turkey. The council, chaired by Baron Pyotr Wrangel received no recognition and would disband after 17 months.
- Dr. Earle Page was elected as the Chairman of the Australian Country Party.
- The 1921 Stanley Cup Final, a best-of-5 series, concluded in Vancouver as the Ottawa Senators (champions of the National Hockey League), won Game 5, defeating the Vancouver Millionaires (champions of the Pacific Coast Hockey Association) by 2 goals to 1.
- Voters in Michigan approved a referendum measure for a bonus to be paid by the state to men who had served as soldiers in World War I.
- A "Gurdwara Bill" was introduced in the Punjab Legislative Assembly of India, ignoring protests from Sikhs.
- In the San Diego mayoral election in California in the U.S., Republican candidate John L. Bacon won by only 82 votes (out of 16,522 cast).
- Died: George Harrison Mifflin, 75, American publisher and co-founder of the Houghton Mifflin textbook company (b. 1845)

== April 6, 1921 (Wednesday) ==
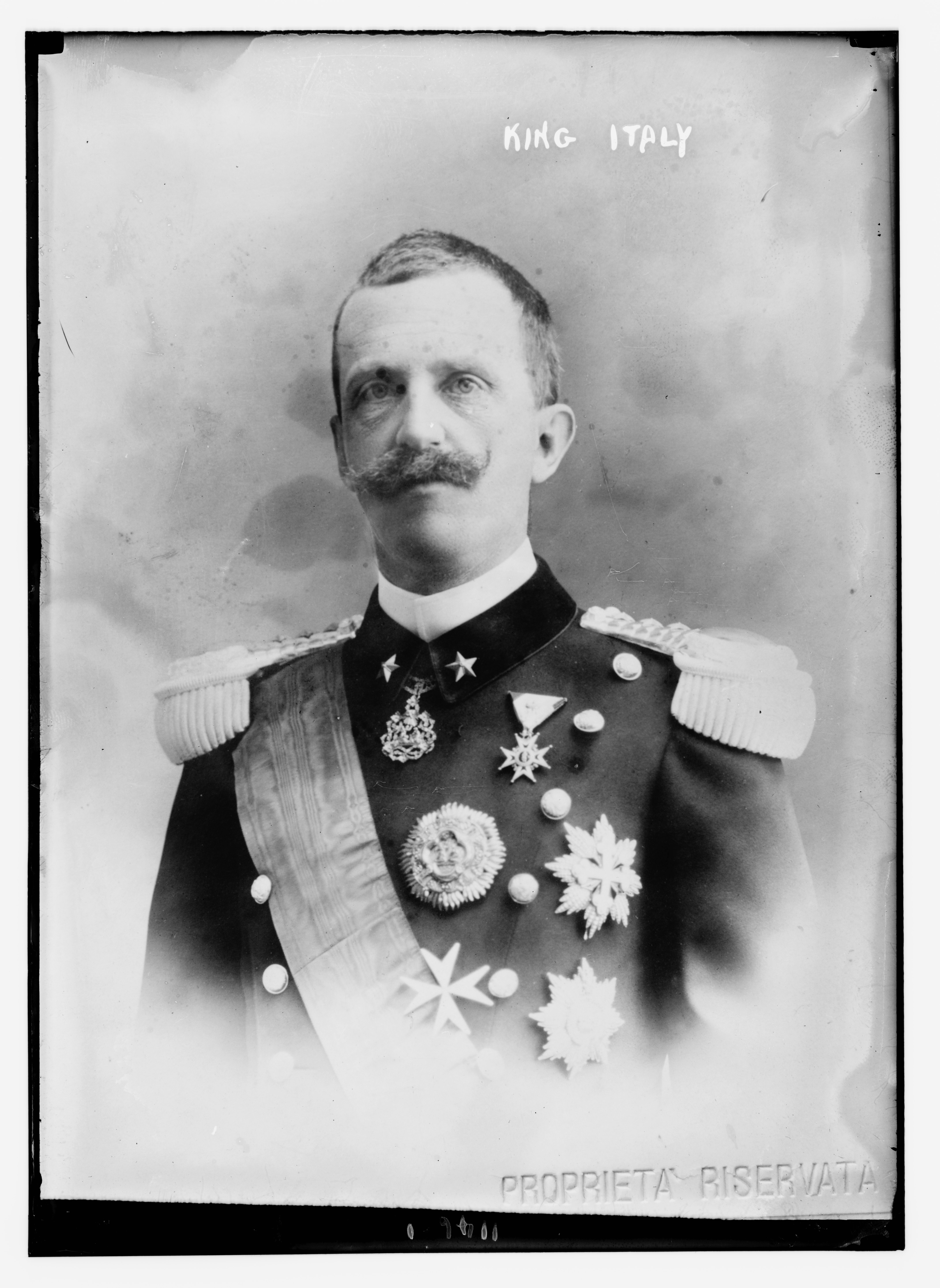
Victor Emmanuel III, King of Italy

- Simon Kimbangu reportedly carried out a miraculous healing in Belgian Congo, effectively founding the "Church of Jesus Christ on Earth through the Prophet Simon Kimbangu."
- The King Vittorio Emanuele III of Italy dissolved the Chamber of Deputies and proclaimed that new elections would be held on May 15.
- Yvonne Vendroux married then-French Army Major and future French prime minister and president Charles de Gaulle.
- Born:
  - Arnold Marquis, German voice actor known for dubbing the roles of John Wayne, Lee Marvin and other stars in German-language releases of U.S. films; in Dortmund, Weimar Republic (d. 1990)
  - Draga Garašanin, French-born Serbian Yugoslavian archaeologist; in Paris (d. 1997)
- Died: Maximilian Berlitz, 68, German linguist, founder of Berlitz Language Schools (b. 1852)

== April 7, 1921 (Thursday) ==
- Lakehurst, New Jersey, was incorporated in the United States.
- Born: Feza Gürsey, Turkish mathematician and physicist; in Istanbul (d. 1992)
- Died:
  - Lorenz Adlon, 71, German hotel owner who built the palatial Hotel Adlon in Berlin; killed after being struck by a car while crossing the Pariser Platz (b. 1849)
  - Mehmet Nuri Efendi, 35-36, Turkish Ottoman interpreter of Islamic law; killed in an ambush by Greek troops (b. 1885)

== April 8, 1921 (Friday) ==
- Dimitrios Gounaris replaced Nikolaos Kalogeropoulos as Prime Minister of Greece.
- The short-lived "Albona Republic", proclaimed on March 7 by striking coal miners in the then-Italian town of Albona (now Labin in Croatia) was suppressed by Italian soldiers at the request of the mining companies.
- The wreckage of the U.S. Navy airship A-5597 was located in the Gulf of Mexico, 16 days after crashing during a training flight on March 23; no trace of the five member crew was found.
- An annular solar eclipse took place, visible from northern Scotland, the northwestern tip of Norway, and some islands in the Arctic Ocean in Russian SFSR.
- Born: Franco Corelli, Italian operatic tenor; in Ancona, Kingdom of Italy (d. 2003)
- Died: James H. Jones, 90, coachman and confidential courier for Jefferson Davis and later a North Carolina local public official

== April 9, 1921 (Saturday) ==
- The Banco Nacional de Cuba, largest bank in Cuba, suspended operations after the collapse of the island's sugar export economy.
- In Georgia, white plantation owner Jasper S. Williams was convicted of the murder of an African-American employee.

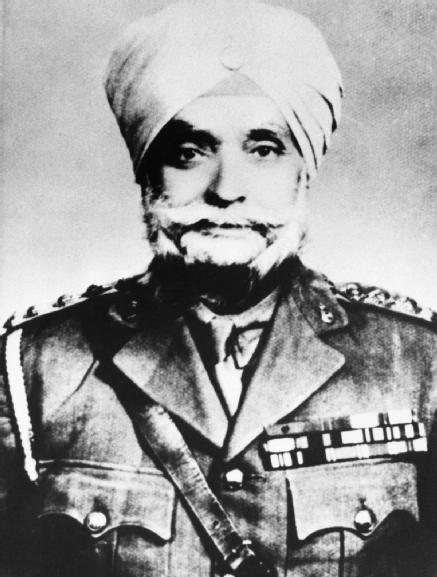
Ishar Singh

- Striking miners in Scotland and Wales brought operations to a halt in 38 coal mines by abandoning pumps and allowing the pits to flood. The number of men walking off the job exceeded 100,000. After a truce was brokered by the British government between the labour unions and the mining companies, the pumping of water was resumed later in the day to prevent irreparable damage to the mines.
- Chaim Weizmann and Albert Einstein were welcomed in New York City by supporters of Zionism and the proposition of the return of Israel as a Jewish state in the Mandate of Palestine. A reception for the two men at the Metropolitan Opera House filled every seat, including the orchestra pit, and attracted hundreds more who were willing to stand.
- Ishar Singh, a soldier of the British Indian Army fighting as part of the British Empire as part of the Waziristan campaign, risked his life to protect the 28th Punjabis unit, an act which later earned him recognition as the first Sikh winner of the Victoria Cross, the highest award for bravery in the United Kingdom.
- Born:
  - Chuck Connors, American actor and professional baseball and basketball player, best known for playing Lucas McCain in The Rifleman, played for both the Chicago Cubs and the Boston Celtics; as Kevin Joseph Connors, in Brooklyn, New York (d. 1992)
  - Bertram Fernando, Sri Lankan film and stage actor; as Emanuel Anthony Bertram Fernando, in Negombo, British Ceylon (present-day Sri Lanka) (d. 1986)
  - Mary Jackson, African-American mathematician and engineer, later profiled in the film Hidden Figures; as Mary Winston, in Hampton, Virginia (d. 2005)
  - Yitzhak Navon, Israeli politician, President of Israel from 1978 to 1983; in Jerusalem (d. 2015)

== April 11, 1921 (Monday) ==
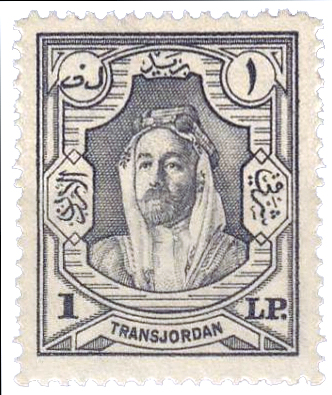
Emir Abdullah of Transjordan

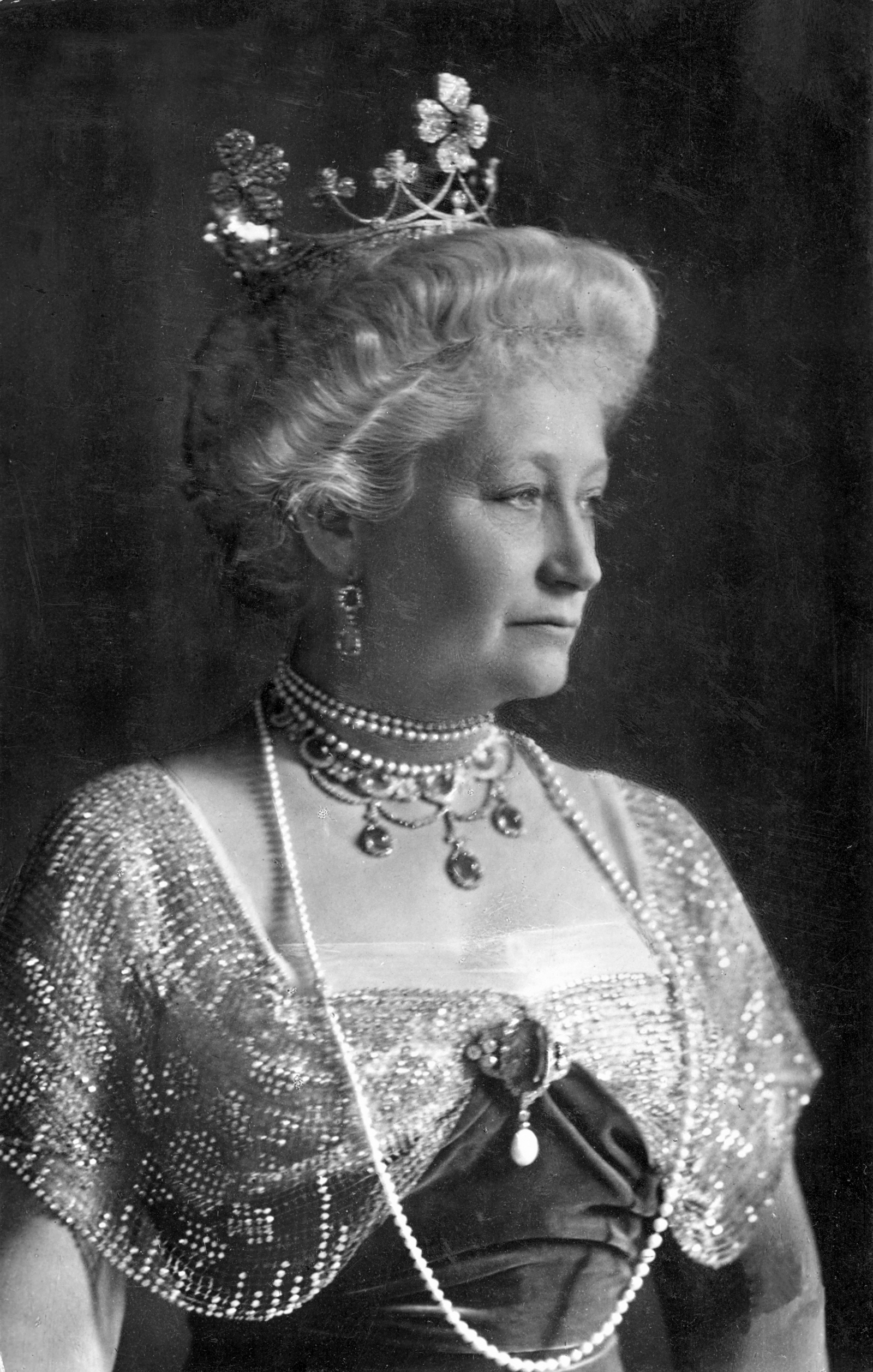
Auguste Viktoria

- The Emirate of Transjordan was created from the portion of the British Mandate for Palestine east of the River Jordan. Abdullah, son of Hussein bin Ali al-Hashimi, King of the Hejaz (now part of Saudi Arabia), was selected by the British to be the ruler of the emirate, now the Kingdom of Jordan.
- Nineteen of the 22 crew on the U.S. cargo ship Colonel Bowie died when the ship foundered in the Gulf of Mexico.
- Iowa reversed a longtime ban on the sale of cigarettes as Governor Nathan E. Kendall signed a bill permitting adults to purchase tobacco starting on July 4, 1921, in any locality that chose the option of legalizing the product. Kendall commented that "The original statute was sufficiently rigorous to banish cigarettes utterly," but added that "the disregard of a restrictive law because it is unpopular entails discredit upon all laws of similar character."
- The Emperor of Japan sent a note of regret to U.S. President Harding, declaring that Crown Prince Hirohito would not be able to accept the President's invitation to visit the United States.
- Direct telephone service was established between the United States and Cuba.
- Born: Maura McNiel, American feminist; in Minneapolis (d. 2020)
- Died: Augusta Victoria of Schleswig-Holstein, 62, former Empress Consort of Germany, wife of Wilhelm II, German Emperor (b. 1858)

== April 12, 1921 (Tuesday) ==
- Italy and Turkey revealed that they had entered into a secret military pact, with Italy vowing to prevent Greece from obtaining Turkish territory if successful in the ongoing war.
- U.S. President Harding delivered his first message to Congress by appearing in person before a joint session, and declared that his administration would support the creation of "a non-political association of nations," and a pact separate from the Treaty of Versailles to end the state of war with Germany and the states of the former Austro-Hungarian Empire. He added that "In the existing League of Nations, world-governing with its super-powers, this Republic will have no part."
- First World War French General Joseph Gallieni, who died in 1916, was posthumously created a Marshal of France.
- France's Minister for the Colonies, Albert Sarraut, revealed his plans for a colonial development program, primarily affecting Niger and Indo-China.
- D. W. Griffith's silent film Dream Street with a two-hour run time, premiered at the Central Theatre in New York. On May 2, it became the first feature-length film to experiment with Griffith's Photokinema process for sound.
- Born: James Dougherty, American police detective, first trainer of the Special Weapons and Tactics, first husband of actress Marilyn Monroe; in Los Angeles (d. 2005)
- Died: William Strang, 62, British painter and engraver (b. 1859)

== April 13, 1921 (Wednesday) ==
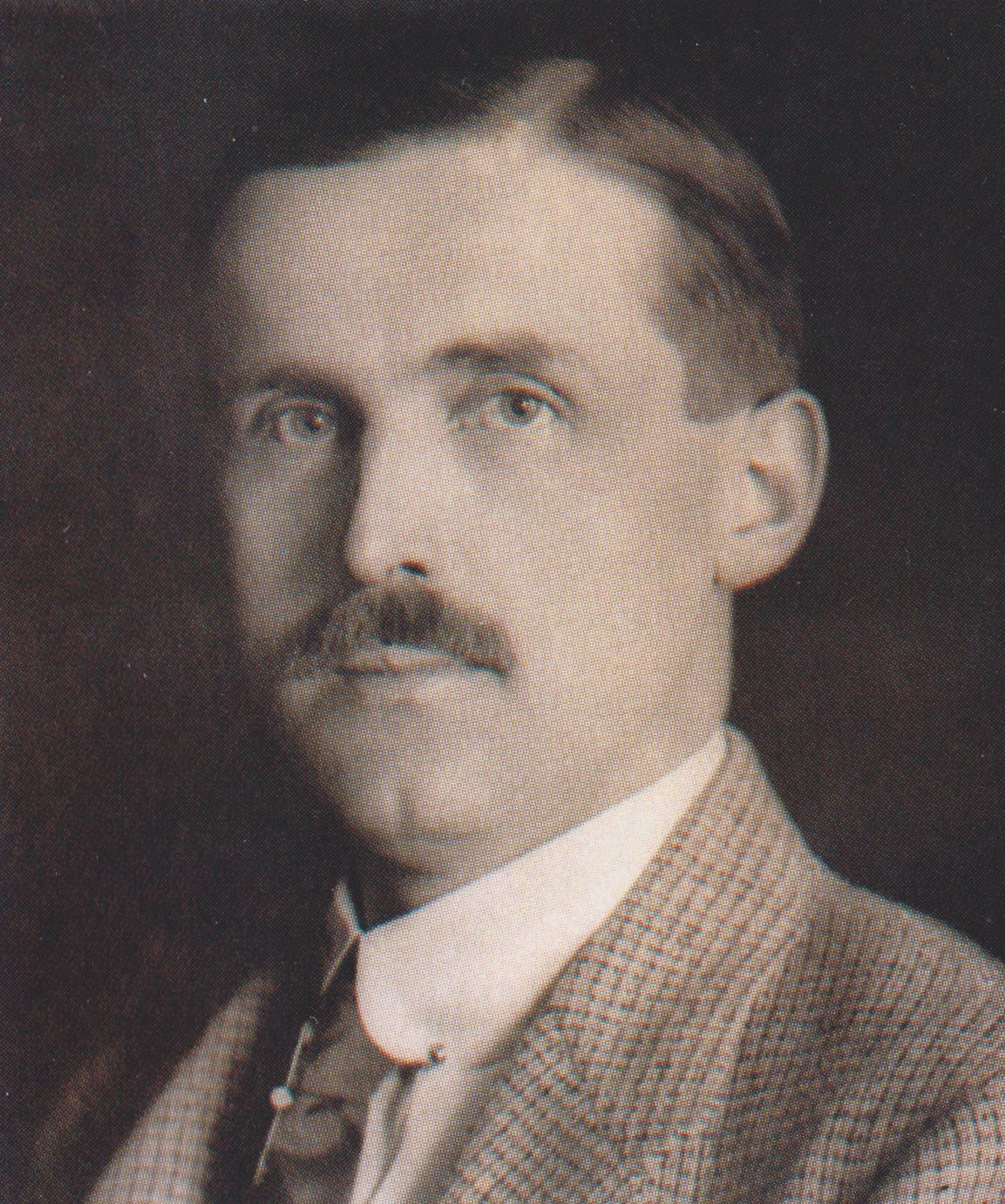
Istvan Friedrich

- Britain's "Triple Alliance" of the trade unions for miners, railroad workers and transport workers issued a manifesto declaring a national strike to begin at 10:00 in the evening on April 15.
- The trial of István Friedrich, the former Prime Minister of Hungary, for attempting to murder one of his predecessors in office, István Tisza, began in Budapest.
- Born:
  - Frank Emilio Flynn, blind Cuban pianist; as Francisco Emilio Flynn Rodríguez, in Havana (d. 2001)
  - Jean Dulieu, Dutch comic strip cartoonist and children's book writer, known for creating the popular European comic character Paulus the gnome; as Jan van Oort, in Amsterdam (d. 2006)

== April 14, 1921 (Thursday) ==
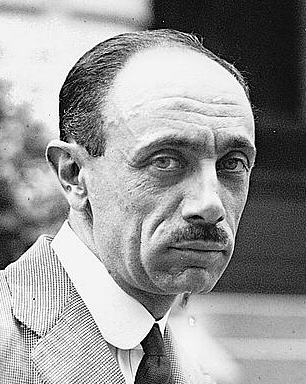
Teleki

- Pál Teleki resigned as Prime Minister of Hungary along with his government, after his weak response to an attempt by former Austro-Hungarian monarch Karoly IV to return to the throne. Teleki was replaced by István Bethlen.
- Greece captured 6,000 Turks after an unsuccessful counterattack by Turkey against the Afiun-Kharahissar base.
- The U.S. Railroad Labor Board annulled the national agreements made by railway unions with the railroads, effective July 1.
- Born: Thomas Schelling, American economist and 2005 Nobel Prize in Economic Sciences laureate; in Oakland, California(d. 2016)
- Died: Sir Arthur Vicars, 58, former Ulster King of Arms; shot and killed by the Irish Republican Army after they had labeled him an informant and set fire to his house. Vicars had been in disgrace since 1907 after the theft of the Irish Crown Jewels during his watch (b. 1862)

== April 15, 1921 (Friday) ==
- France's Cabinet of Ministers voted to have the French Army occupy the entire Ruhr region of Germany unless payment of one billion German marks was made by May 10.
- Britain's railway and transport unions reversed their position and announced that they would not go on a sympathy strike to follow the striking coal miners. The event was referred to by the striking miners as "Black Friday."
- President Charles D.B. King of Liberia was welcomed by U.S. president Warren G. Harding, after a U.S. loan of $5,000,000 to Liberia was almost completely repaid.
- Poland ratified its peace treaty with the Soviet Union and Ukraine, acquiring the district of Polesia from Ukraine, 3,000 square kilometers near Minsk, and 30,000,000 gold rubles.
- The United States announced the return from Europe of 14,852 bodies of American soldiers who had been buried in France, and that 75,882 remained overseas, including 13,000 whose families had reversed their original request for a return of their relatives to the U.S.
- Born: Georgy Beregovoy, Soviet cosmonaut, earliest-born human being to orbit the Earth on Soyuz 3 in 1968; in Fedorivka, Poltava Oblast, Ukrainian SSR (d. 1995)
- Died: Antonin Dubost, 79, French journalist and politician, former president of the French Senate (b. 1842)

== April 16, 1921 (Saturday) ==
- Tornadoes swept across five U.S. states in the Deep South, killing 97 people altogether, 66 of whom were in Hempstead County and Miller County in Arkansas. Late the night before, the tornados began in northeast Texas, and then swept along an eastward path over five U.S. states, ending up in northwest Georgia.
- Born: Peter Ustinov, English actor, writer, and director; as Peter Alexander Freiherr von Ustinov, in London (d. 2004)

== April 17, 1921 (Sunday) ==
- Voters in Cuba elected Alfredo Zayas y Alfonso as the new president.
- Died: Manwel Dimech, 60, Maltese social reformer, philosopher and writer; died in Egypt while imprisoned in a concentration camp at Alexandria (b. 1860)

== April 18, 1921 (Monday) ==
- Voters in Canada's Ontario province approved the ban on the importation of liquor, by a margin of more than 59%.
- By a vote of 5 to 4, the U.S. Supreme Court upheld the constitutionality of the rent reform laws that had been passed in New York and in the District of Columbia.
- Oilton, Oklahoma was incorporated as a city with a population of over 2,200 people. In 2020, almost a century later, it would have less than half that number.
- Born: Philip E. Bernatz, American thoracic surgeon; in Decorah, Iowa (d. 2010)
- Died: August Scherl, 71, German newspaper magnate (b. 1849)

== April 19, 1921 (Tuesday) ==
- The funeral of the former Kaiserin of the German Empire, Augusta Victoria, was carried out in Potsdam with full state honors afforded to her by the republic, proclaimed after Kaiser Wilhelm II had been deposed in 1918. Of the 300,000 people in attendance, an estimated 25,000 were monarchists who wanted to return to rule by a Kaiser. There was no official representation at the funeral by either the German or Prussian government.
- The statue of Simon Bolivar, a gift to New York City from Venezuela, was dedicated by U.S. President Harding in Central Park.
- A by-election for the British House of Commons, brought about by the appointment of the incumbent MP Stanley Baldwin as President of the Board of Trade, was won by Baldwin himself.
- The city of Dunbar, West Virginia, near the state capital at Charleston, was incorporated as a residence for employees of the local glass company.
- Born: Anna Lee Aldred, American jockey and trick rider in rodeos, first woman in the United States to be licensed as a horse racing jockey; as Anna Lee Mills, in Montrose, Colorado (d. 2006)

== April 20, 1921 (Wednesday) ==
- Seven years after the original signing, the U.S. Senate ratified the Thomson–Urrutia Treaty with Colombia by a vote of 69 to 19, with the U.S. paying Colombia $25,000,000 in return for Colombia's recognition of the independence of Panama.
- Germany requested the United States to act as a mediator in the reparation currency between the German people and the Allied Council. U.S. Secretary of State Charles Evans Hughes rejected the German request.
- The first English-language production of Ferenc Molnár's play Liliom opened on Broadway in New York City, starring Joseph Schildkraut and Eva Le Gallienne. It would go on to inspire Rodgers and Hammerstein's musical Carousel.

== April 21, 1921 (Thursday) ==
- The Cawthron Institute, the largest independent science research organization in New Zealand, was opened in the city of Nelson, funded from a bequest made from the will of the late Thomas Cawthron.
- The first legislative elections in the history of Albania were held, with a popular vote to select a group of electors who, in turn, would select the 78 members of the unicameral Kuvendi.
- The third election to the Legislative Council of Ceylon was held in present-day Sri Lanka, then a British colony.
- Died:
  - Rosa Mulholland, 79-80, Irish novelist and playwright (b. 1841)
  - Edmund James Mills, 80, British chemist (b. 1840)

== April 22, 1921 (Friday) ==
- Peru's president Augusto B. Leguia suspended the South American nation's Congress and declared a dictatorship.
- Over 100 people were injured in the town of Bound Brook, New Jersey, and one died, when a cloud of phosgene gas began spreading over the city in the early morning hours, the result of a faulty valve of a storage tank at a paint factory in town. The intervention of four people stopped further escape of the phosgene, which had been used in concentrated form as a chemical weapon during World War I.
- A total lunar eclipse was visible in parts of the Americas and Pacific region.
- Died: Vibeke Salicath, 59, Danish feminist and women's rights activist (b. 1861)

== April 23, 1921 (Saturday) ==
- Service Employees International Union (SEIU) was founded in Chicago as a labor union for people working in health care, government employment and property services, initially as the Building Services Employees Union (BSEU).
- The U.S. Census Bureau announced that the total foreign-born population of the United States had increased by only 2.6% since 1910, for a total of 13,703,987 overall. From 1900 to 1910, the increase had been 30.7%. The Bureau ascribed the dramatic decrease in foreign population growth "to the almost complete cessation of immigration... and to considerable emigration" during World War I. During World War I, the Bureau noted, over 800,000 German immigrants; 600,000 Austrians (over half of the Austrian-born U.S. population) 316,000 Irish and 203,783 Russians had left the United States.
- Died: John P. Young, 71, American journalist and historian (b. 1849)

== April 24, 1921 (Sunday) ==
- In a plebiscite in the Austrian state of Tyrol, residents voted overwhelmingly to become part of Germany.
- Herbert Hoover's Near East Relief project announced that it had provided food relief to 561,970 people and spent $13,129,117 of its budget of $13.5 million. The project had also distributed 300,000 garments.

== April 25, 1921 (Monday) ==
- Japan's House of Peers rejected the measure adopted by the House of Representatives to authorize the participation of women in political associations.
- Following up on the French ultimatum to Germany, the Allied Reparations Commission demanded that Germany deposit one billion marks worth of gold into the Bank of France by April 30.
- Communists seized control of the government of Fiume after being defeated in voting.
- The U.S. state of Nebraska prohibited persons other than U.S. citizens from acquiring property. The law did not affect the property already owned by alien residents.
- Born: Karel Appel, Dutch painter, sculptor and poet; as Christiaan Karel Appel, in Amsterdam (d. 2006)
- Died: Thomas Traynor, 39, Irish Republican Army; hanged at Mountjoy Prison in Dublin after his conviction by a British Army court-martial for the ambush of two British cadets on March 14.

== April 26, 1921 (Tuesday) ==
- France's Chamber of Deputies voted overwhelmingly in favor of the government of Prime Minister Aristide Briand regarding his policies toward German reparations and occupation of the Ruhr, with 424 in favor and only 29 against. Another 59 deputies abstained.
- In Turin in Italy, Fascists occupied and burned the local labor union hall (camera del lavoro, literally the "chamber of labor").
- In the U.S., a tornado killed 12 people and destroyed most of the business district in the town of Braxton, Mississippi.
- Born: Margaret Gowing, English historian; as Margaret Elliot, in Kensington, London (d. 1998)
- Died: Cornelia von Levetzow, 85, Danish novelist who wrote under the pen name "J" (b. 1836)

== April 27, 1921 (Wednesday) ==
- The Soviet Union and Poland established diplomatic relations.
- The Allied reparations commission announced that the amount agreed for war reparations by Germany would be 132 billion gold marks (US $605 billion in 2025), in annual installments of 2.5 billion.
- The Douglass National Bank, described in the press as "the first national bank to be controlled by negroes," (as opposed to a private bank not regulated by the federal government) received its charter from the Comptroller of Currency in Washington. It had $200,000 in capital and $50,000 in surplus, with shares of stock limited to African Americans living in Chicago.
- Lord Edmund Talbot was appointed Lord Lieutenant of Ireland in succession to Viscount French, and given the title of Viscount FitzAlan. FitzAlan became the first Roman Catholic to hold the office since 1685.
- Liberal MP J. H. Whitley was elected to replace James Lowther as Speaker of the British House of Commons.
- The World Federation of Agricultural Workers (Fédération mondiale de travailleurs agricoles or FMTA) was established at The Hague in the Netherlands as the International Federation of Christian Agricultural Workers' Unions. In 1982, it would merge with another union to form the World Federation of Agriculture and Food Workers (WFAFW).

== April 28, 1921 (Thursday) ==
- José Raúl Capablanca of Cuba won the World Chess Championship, held in Havana, after his opponent Emanuel Lasker conceded.
- The Scranton Miners team, champion of the Pennsylvania State Basketball League, defeated the New York State Basketball League titlist Albany Senators in Game 5 of the best-3-of-5 "world series of professional basketball" to win the professional title. In the deciding game, held at Scranton's 13th Regiment Armory building in front of 1,500 fans, the Miners won, 29 to 19.
- A jury in Deming, New Mexico acquitted 16 of 21 Mexican defendants who had been charged with murder in the March 9, 1916 attack on Columbus, New Mexico in the U.S. by Mexican troops on orders of Pancho Villa. The raid by Villa's forces had killed 11 U.S. civilians.
- Born: Simin Daneshvar, Iranian novelist; in Fasa (d. 2012)
- Died: Maurice Moore, 26, Thomas Mulcahy, Patrick O'Sullivan and Patrick Ronayne, Irish Republican Army members, were all executed by a British Army firing squad at Collins Barracks, Cork, after a court-martial (b. 1894)

== April 29, 1921 (Friday) ==
- Plans for national airline of airships, designed to transport passengers between New York, Chicago and San Francisco before the end of 1922 were announced by U.S. engineer Fred S. Hardesty, who told reporters that fifty million dollars' worth of stock would be sold to finance the construction of dirigibles 757 feet (231 m) long. Hardesty said further that the new dirigibles would be able carry 52 passengers at speeds of up to 100 miles per hour (160 km/h), with service between New York and Chicago to start by the spring of 1922.
- The Portuguese ocean liner Mormugao, with 448 passengers and crew ran aground and was stranded near Block Island off of the coast of the U.S. state of Rhode Island, prompting a two-day rescue effort by the U.S. Coast Guard and the U.S. Navy. Women and children were brought to New Bedford, Massachusetts later in the day and the remaining 148 male passengers were rescued the next day.
- Italy’s Fascist Party staged a countercoup in Fiume and drove out the Communists.
- Died: Arthur Mold, 57, English cricketer (b. 1863)

== April 30, 1921 (Saturday) ==
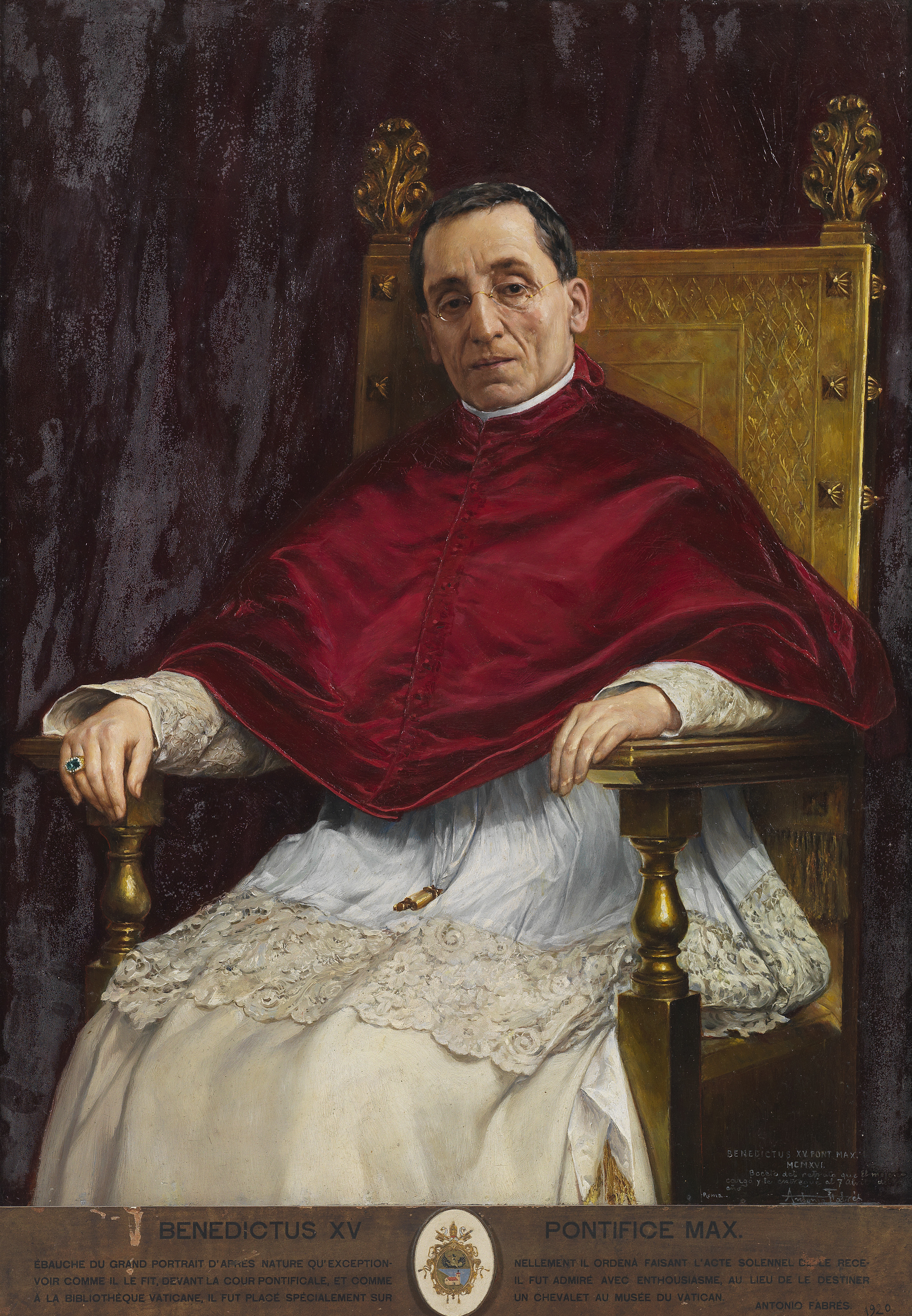
Pope Benedict XV

- The U.S. Senate passed the Knox peace resolution, 49 to 23, declaring an end to the state of war with Germany that had started on April 6, 1917, with the entry of the U.S. into World War I.
- Pope Benedict XV issued the encyclical In praeclara summorum, dedicated to the memory of Dante Alighieri.
- Born: Tove Maës, Danish actress; in Copenhagen (d. 2010)
