= James Henry Jones =

James Henry Jones may refer to:

- James H. Jones (Texas politician) (1830–1904), U.S. Representative from Texas.
- James H. Jones (North Carolina politician) (died 1921), coachman and confidential courier for Jefferson Davis and later a local public official in North Carolina
