= Chaver =

Chaver may refer to:

- Chaver (title) (also spelled chaber), a Hebrew term meaning "associate", "friend", or similar
- Chaver, a Malayalam term meaning "martyrs" or "suicide attackers"
  - Mamankam#Tradition of chavers (suicidal warriors), tradition of an Indian festival
  - Chaaver, a 2023 Indian Malyalam-language thriller film directed by Tinu Pappachan

== People ==
People with the surname Chavers include:

- P.W. Chavers (1876–1933), African-American businessman and journalist
- Dean Chavers (born 1941), Native American educationalist

== See also ==
- Charver, a term for "chav" in Northern England
