= McNiel =

McNiel is a surname. Notable people with the surname include:

- Maura McNiel (1921–2020), American women's rights activist
- Skye McNiel (born 1978), American politician
