= May 1921 =

Month of 1921

<<	May 1921					>>
Su	Mo	Tu	We	Th	Fr	Sa
1	2	3	4	5	6	7
8	9	10	11	12	13	14
15	16	17	18	19	20	21
22	23	24	25	26	27	28
29	30	31

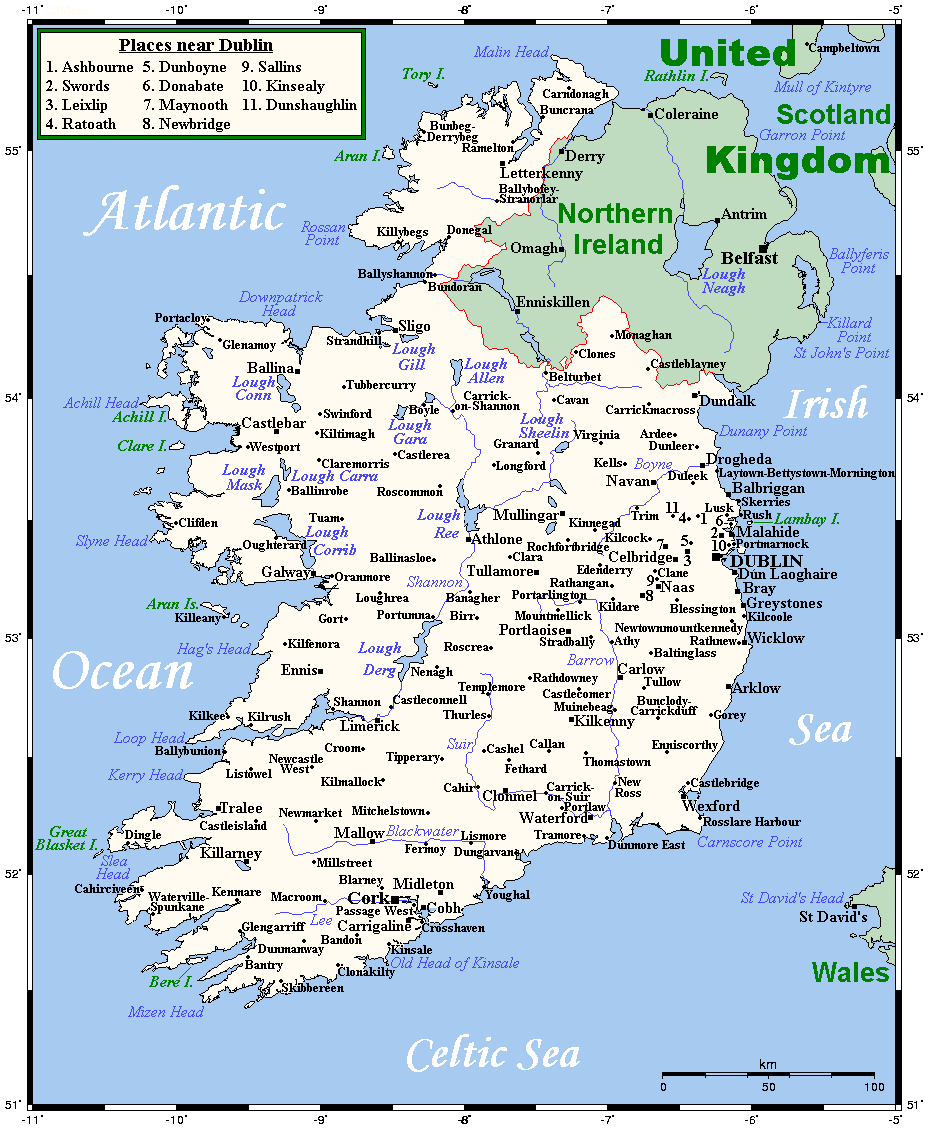
May 3, 1921: Ireland officially divided into two provinces

The following events occurred in May 1921:

== May 1, 1921 (Sunday) ==
- Riots began in Jaffa, at the time in the British Mandate for Palestine. The activities of the Jewish Communist Party, calling for the establishment of a "Soviet Palestine," culminated in a march through the Jewish-Arab border neighborhood of Manshiyya, where they clashed with the rival socialist Ahdut HaAvoda group, leading to large-scale rioting involving Jews, Christians, Arabs and Muslims. Within days, at least 40 people had been killed.
- The U.S. Navy opened a commercial wireless service between North America and Indo-China.

== May 2, 1921 (Monday) ==
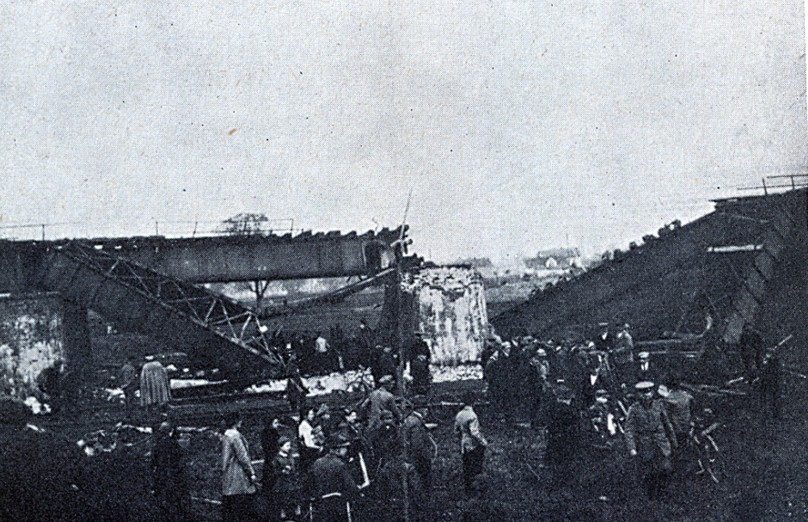
Bridge near Oppeln destroyed during the "Operation Bridges"

- The third Silesian civil war began with "Operation Bridges", in which the Wawelberg Group (Polish forces, under the leadership of Wojciech Korfanty), destroyed German rail bridges near Neustadt, Kreuzburg, Cosel, Oppeln and Schwientochlowitz (now the Polish cities of Prudnik, Kluczbork, Kędzierzyn-Koźle, Opole and Świętochłowice). In response, the Inter-Allied Commission declared a martial law for the urban and rural districts of Beuthen, Ratabor, Pless, Rybnick, Hindenburg and Tarnowitz (now the Polish cities of Bytom, Raciborz, Pszczyna, Rybnik, Zabrze and Tarnowskie Góry).
- Giovanni Ancillotto flew across the Andes in Peru in an Ansaldo A.1 Balilla, making the journey from Lima to Cerro de Pasco in 1 hour 35 minutes, at an average altitude of 5,500 meters (18,044 feet), reached a maximum altitude of 7,000 meters (22,966 feet) while passing Mount Meiggs; he covered the 76 miles from Lima to La Oroya at an average speed of 230 km/h (143 mph).
- U.S. Secretary of State Charles Evans Hughes sent a memorandum to Germany announcing that the United States would not serve as a moderator in the reparations dispute.
- General Jean Degoutte of France concentrated nine divisions of French Army troops on the border with Germany in preparation of occupying the Ruhr valley.
- The U.S. Supreme Court reversed the conviction of Senator Truman Newberry of Michigan for violation of the Federal Corrupt Practices Act.
- The Japanese passenger ship Tokuyo Maru caught fire and sank in the Pacific Ocean. The U.S. Army transport ship USAT Buford rescued 65 survivors.
- Born: Satyajit Ray, Indian filmmaker, screenwriter, music composer, graphic artist, lyricist and author; in Calcutta, British India (present-day Kolkata, India) (d. 1992)
- Died: Yosef Haim Brenner, 39, Russian-born Hebrew writer; murdered in the Jaffa Riots (b. 1881)

== May 3, 1921 (Tuesday) ==
- Ireland was partitioned under British law by the Government of Ireland Act 1920, creating Northern Ireland and Southern Ireland.

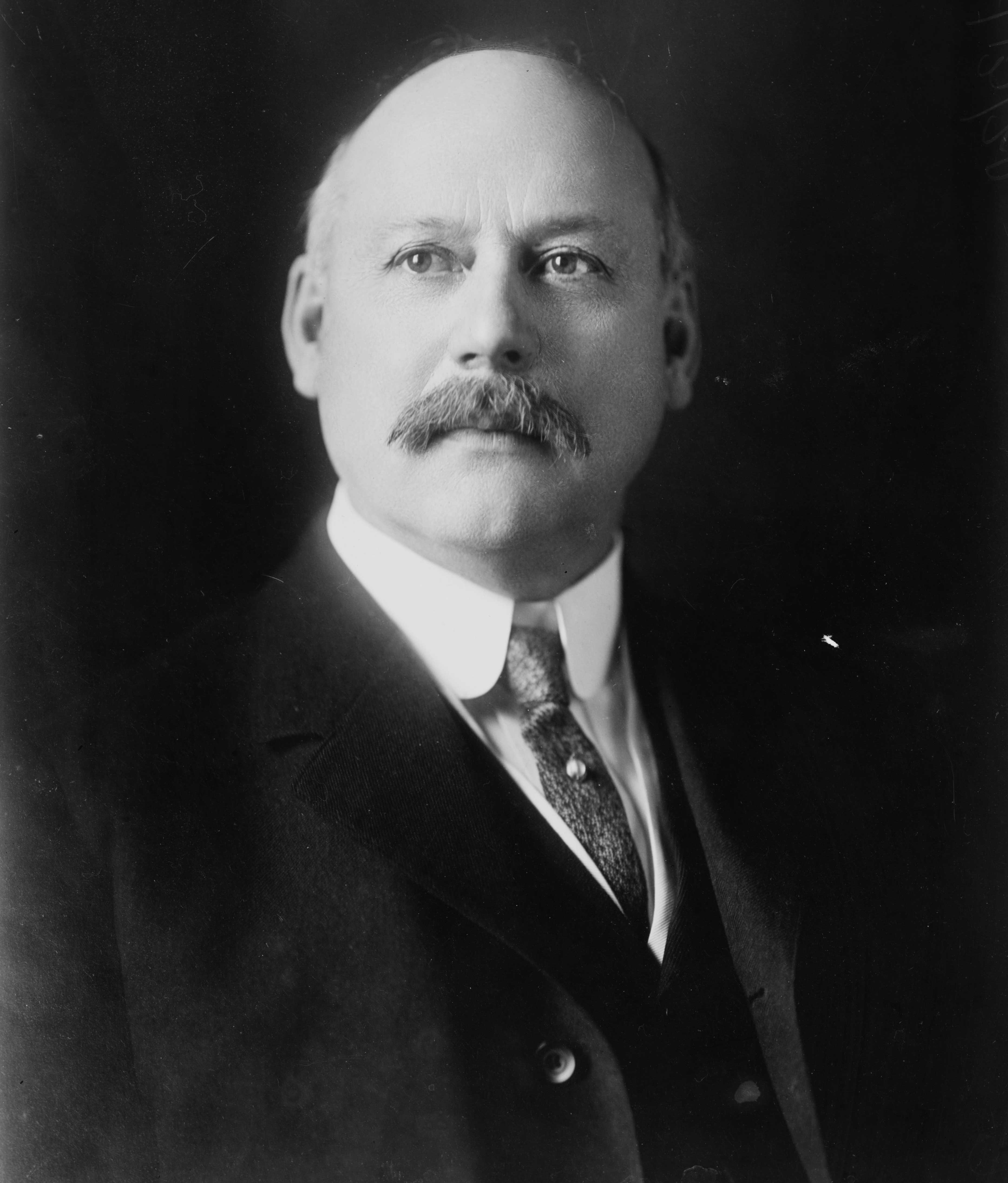
U.S. Secretary of War John W. Weeks

- U.S. Secretary of War John W. Weeks announced that all draft evaders of the recent World War would be arrested, and that he would issue a list of willful deserters. The published lists proved to be an embarrassment to Weeks after it was clear that they hadn't been verified.
- U.S. Steel Corporation announced that it was reducing the wages of 150,000 day laborers by 20%, with salary cuts to take place on May 16. Wages, which had been raised in early 1918 because of the shortage of workers due to World War I, were returned to their pre-war level. The minimum wage rate for a U.S. Steel employee was changed from 46 cents per hour to 36 cents per hour.
- The third population census of the population of the Union of South Africa was enumerated. According to the final enumeration, the population of the minority-ruled Union in 1921 was 6,927,403 of whom 1,521,343 were white and 5,406,060 were non-whites.
- The government of France called up 200,000 men in preparation for the occupation of Germany's Ruhr Valley.
- The U.S. Senate passed the Dillingham Immigration Bill, similar to one vetoed by President Wilson in February, by a vote of 78 to 1 in favor.
- Born: Sugar Ray Robinson, American professional boxer; as Walker Smith Jr., in Ailey, Georgia (d. 1989)
- Died: William Robert Brooks, 76, British-born American astronomer who discovered 27 comets during his career (b. 1844)

== May 4, 1921 (Wednesday) ==
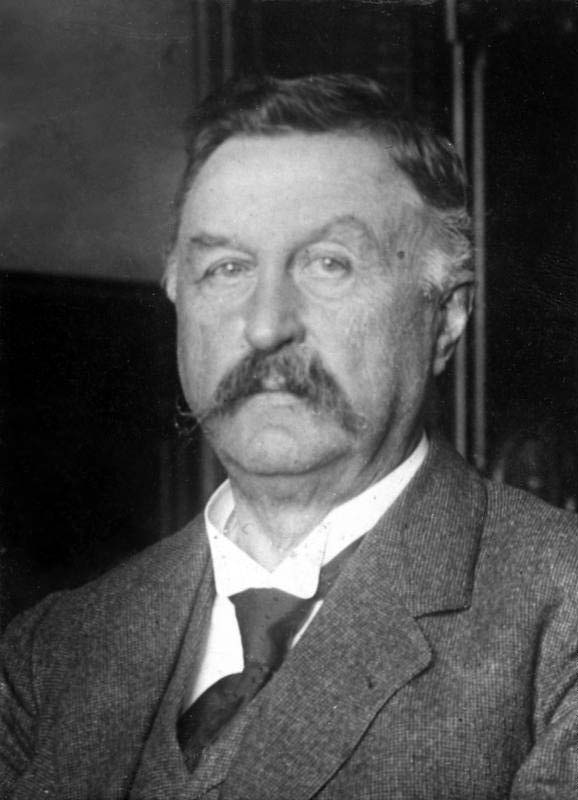
German Chancellor Constantin Fehrenbach

- Chancellor Constantin Fehrenbach of Germany and his cabinet resigned upon news that an ultimatum would be sent from the Allies to agree to binding reparations payments.
- Born: Edo Murtić, Croatian painter; in Velika Pisanica, Kingdom of Yugoslavia (d. 2005)

== May 5, 1921 (Thursday) ==
- The Allied Supreme War Council notified Germany of a default on the May 1 payment due for 12 billion gold marks and announced that Germany would have until May 12 to accept a total debt of 135 billion marks (equivalent to £6.75 billion or $33.75 billion), to be "paid in an indeterminate number of annual installments" worth of gold. British Prime Minister David Lloyd George handed the ultimatum, signed by himself and representatives of France, Belgium, Italy and Japan to Germany's Ambassador Friedrich Sthamer.
- Sir James Craig, leader of the Ulster Unionist Party of Northern Ireland, and Éamon de Valera, leader of the Sinn Féin party of Ireland, met in conference.
- The lowest attendance in the history of The Football League was recorded when only 13 paying spectators attended a football match between Leicester City and Stockport County F.C. in England. (However, the number of non-paying spectators at the match may have been between 1,000 and 2,000.)
- Died:
  - Alfred Hermann Fried, 56, Austrian Jewish pacifist writer and Nobel laureate (b. 1864)
  - W. Friese Greene, 66, English inventor and motion picture pioneer (b. 1855)
  - Arthur P. Schmidt, 75, pioneering German-American music publisher (b. 1846)

== May 6, 1921 (Friday) ==
- A provisional treaty was signed in Berlin, by which Germany recognized the Soviet regime in Russia.
- A proposed resolution by U.S. Representative George H. Tinkham of Massachusetts, to investigate disenfranchisement of African Americans in the South, was rejected by the House of Representatives, with only 46 in favor and 285 against.
- U.S. President Warren G. Harding accepted Britain's invitation to send representatives to the Reparations Conference.

== May 7, 1921 (Saturday) ==
- The first fully professional soccer football league in the United States, the American Soccer League (ASL), was founded by representatives of eight of the strongest teams in the nation at that time. The ASL would begin play on September 17 with teams in Philadelphia; Newark, Jersey City and Kearney in New Jersey; New York City and Brooklyn in New York; Pawtucket, Rhode Island; and Fall River, and Holyoke in Massachusetts.
- The 47th Kentucky Derby took place at Churchill Downs and was won by Behave Yourself.
- Born: Asa Briggs, English historian; in Keighley, West Riding of Yorkshire (d. 2016)

== May 8, 1921 (Sunday) ==
- Sweden's Riksdag passed a bill abolishing capital punishment in Sweden.
- The League of Nations Commission in Åland awarded the territory to Finland.
- The 1921 Copa del Rey football tournament concluded in the San Mamés Stadium in Bilbao, Spain, with Athletic Bilbao winning the trophy, 4–1 over Atlético Madrid.

== May 9, 1921 (Monday) ==
- Japan's Crown Prince and future Showa Emperor, Hirohito, became the first member of Japanese royalty to visit the United Kingdom, arriving at Portsmouth where he was greeted by Edward, Prince of Wales, heir to the British throne and future King Edward VIII. The two heirs apparent then traveled by train to Victoria Station in London where they were greeted by King George V and Albert, Duke of York, the future King George VI.
- Albert Einstein was honored at Princeton University with the honorary degree of Doctor of Science during his visit to the United States. Praising Einstein, university president John Grier Hibben said "In his structural theory of our ever-old, ever-new universe, his name stands latest in that illustrious series wherein the other moderns are Clark Maxwell, Sir Isaac Newton and Galileo, and the earliest name is Pythagoras," and added, "So, today, for his genius and integrity, we, who inadequately measure his power, salute the new Columbus of science, 'voyaging through strange seas of thought alone.'"
- Born: Manuel Gregorio Acosta, Mexican-born American painter, muralist and illustrator; in Aldama, Chihuahua (d. 1989)
- Died: William H. Frankhauser, 58, American politician, U.S. Representative for Michigan, committed suicide by slashing his throat with a razor blade while at the Battle Creek Sanitarium in Battle Creek, Michigan. (b. 1863)

== May 10, 1921 (Tuesday) ==
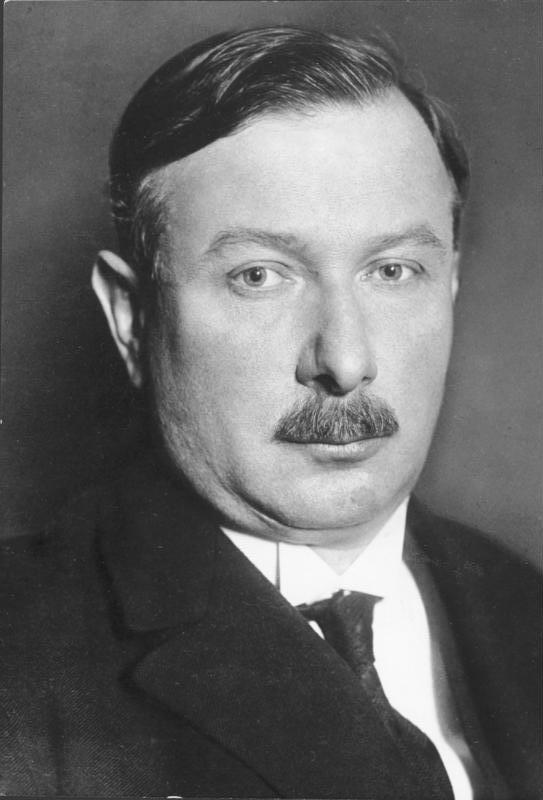
Chancellor Wirth

- Joseph Wirth replaced Constantin Fehrenbach as Chancellor of Germany, and named himself as the Foreign Minister.
- Germany's Reichstag voted, 221 to 175, to yield to Allied demands for immediate disarmament, to try German war criminals, and to accept the reparations terms.
- The first performance of Luigi Pirandello's Six Characters in Search of an Author (Sei personaggi in cerca d'autore), at the Teatro Valle in Rome, met with a mixed response, provoking a brawl.

== May 11, 1921 (Wednesday) ==
- Germany sent a note unconditionally accepting the reparation terms described in the ultimatum of May 5. In London, German Ambassador Friedrich Sthamer delivered the note of acceptance to Prime Minister David Lloyd George, stating the German government had resolved "to carry out without reserve or condition its obligations" to guarantee reparations, partially disarm its armed forces and to put accused war criminals on trial in German courts.
- Thousands of people rioted in Kanchrapara after workers on the Eastern Bengal State Railway in British India went on strike.
- British cotton weavers and spinners had their wages reduced by 30% by their employers.
- Newspapers across North America, including The New York Times, printed what turned out to be a false report from the agent for comedian Charlie Chaplin that he had been "severely burned" during the filming of his latest movie, The Idle Class. According to the account, "An acetylene torch used in the scene set Chaplin's coat and voluminous trousers afire. In a second he was aflame from head to foot" and "was saved from fatal injury by employees, who wrapped him in wet blankets." Chaplin would write later that after a slight accident with a blowtorch requiring him to add "another layer of asbestos" to his outfit, his agent exaggerated the matter. "Carl Robinson saw an opportunity for publicity... That evening I was shocked to read headlines that I had been severely burnt about the face, hands and body.... I issued a denial, but few newspapers printed it." The papers that did print a correction generally did so as a less-prominently displayed followup.

== May 12, 1921 (Thursday) ==
- The mass arrest of 51 Romanian communists was carried out in Bucharest at the conclusion of a convention of the Socialist Party of Romania, on orders of Interior Minister Constantin Argetoianu. Four days earlier, Gheorghe Cristescu and other members of the Partidul Socialist who were in favor of agreeing to ally with the program of Communist International (Comintern) had voted to create a separate faction, the Partidul Comunist Român. With the approval of Prime Minister Alexander Averescu, party leader Cristescu and other leaders were imprisoned for eight months before being given a trial, while 220 other Romanian communists were arrested and charged in a roundup. After the conviction of 261 people, 213 would be granted amnesty by King Ferdinand on June 6, 1922, while the other 48 would serve sentences of up to ten years.
- Born:
  - Joseph Beuys, German Fluxus artist; in Krefeld (d. 1986)
  - Edmund Abel, American electrical engineer and inventor who patented the compact heating element used in most home coffee brewing machinery including the original "Mr. Coffee" brewer in 1972; in Cleveland (d. 2014)
  - Farley Mowat, Canadian naturalist and author; in Belleville, Ontario (d. 2014)
- Died:
  - Reverend George Wylie Clinton, 62, Bishop of the African Methodist Episcopal Church, "one of the most influential negro ministers in the South."
  - Countess Emilia Pardo Bazán, 69, Spanish author (b. 1851)

== May 13, 1921 (Friday) ==
- Under the new Home Rule Act for the 26 predominantly Roman Catholic counties of Ireland, elections were held for the Parliament of Southern Ireland. The Sinn Féin's 124 unopposed candidates captured all of the parliament, except for four Independent Unionist Party members from Dublin who had run unopposed. Half of the winning candidates were incarcerated. The remaining Sinn Féin winners, who had campaigned on a platform of Irish independence, stated that they would refuse the oath of allegiance to the Crown, part of the swearing-in ceremony.
- Lord Reading, the Governor-General of India, conferred with the Mahatma Gandhi, leader of the Indian independence movement, at a meeting in Simla.
- Komatsu Ironworks, a predecessor of Komatsu, a worldwide construction machinery and forklift brand, was founded in Ishikawa Prefecture, Japan.
- All seven of the crew on the U.S. schooner Miztec died when the ship foundered in Lake Superior during a blizzard, off Vermilion Point, Michigan.

== May 14, 1921 (Saturday) ==
- A geomagnetic storm, caused by a solar outburst, began interfering with telegraph and telephone transmissions (and railroad signals) and causing an aurora borealis to be observed in the northeastern United States. The activity was attributed by astronomers at the U.S. Naval Observatory to a sunspot 94,000 miles (151,000 km) long and 21,000 miles (34,000 km) wide, lasting until May 17 and causing damage in North America, Europe and the southern hemisphere.

== May 15, 1921 (Sunday) ==
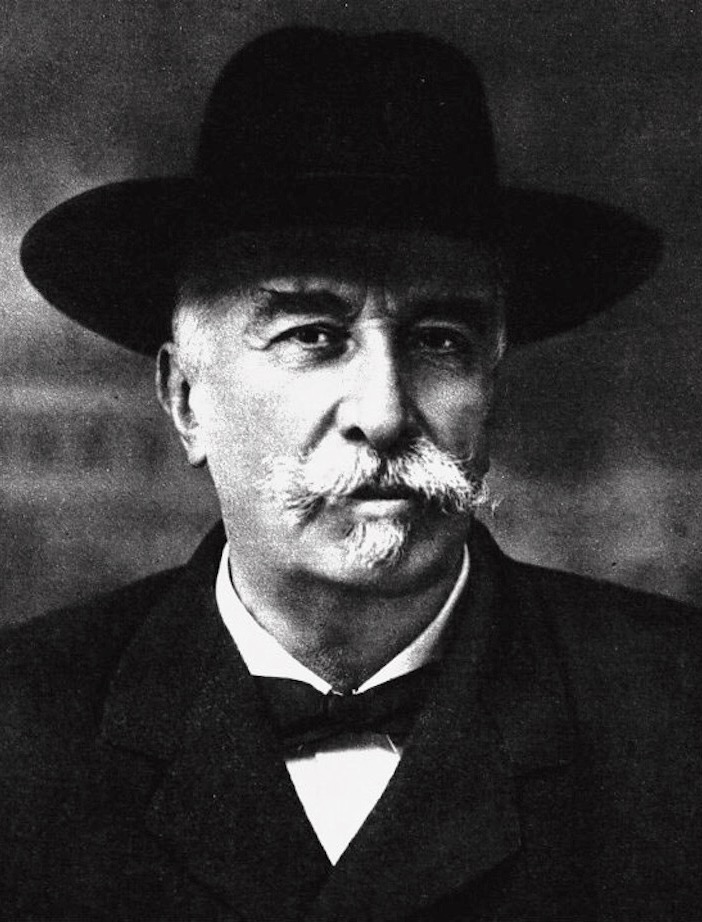
Italian Prime Minister Giovanni Giolitti

- Elections were held for the Italian Chamber of Deputies. Prime Minister Giovanni Giolitti's National Coalition won 266 seats, while the Socialist Party dropped its share from 184 to 134, and the Catholic Party dropped from 122 to 102. Benito Mussolini was elected for the first time.
- U.S. stunt pilot Laura Bromwell set a new record for consecutive loops by a woman, with a total of 199 consecutive loops in 1 hour 20 minutes over Roosevelt Field near Mineola, New York on Long Island. She was killed in a plane crash three weeks later.
- Born: Baron Vaea (Siaosi Tuʻihala ʻAlipate Vaea Tupou), Prime Minister of Tonga from 1991 to 2000 (d. 2009)

== May 16, 1921 (Monday) ==
- The Communist Party of Czechoslovakia was founded at a conference in Prague. Meeting in Prague, former Social Democrats met as delegates to a congress of the Czechoslovak Social Democrats of the Left (Československé sociálně demokratické strany dělnické, levice or Česko-slovenskej sociálnodemokratickej strany, ľavicovej) voted, 562 to 7, to join Comintern.
- The U.S. Supreme Court decided that the capital gains tax (a tax on the increased value of corporate assets) could be assessed and included in profits for purposes of calculating taxable revenue. The Court also rejected a challenge to the ratification clause of the 18th Amendment for prohibition of the manufacture, transport and sale of alcohol.

== May 17, 1921 (Tuesday) ==
- The UK's Ministry of Labour, under Thomas Macnamara, issued an order confirming general minimum time-rates, piece-work basis time-rates and overtime rates for male and female workers.
- The United States Bureau of the Census announced the final figures for the 1920 decennial census, adding 27,512 to the provisional number announced on October 7. The final figure was 105,710,620 for the 48 states and 117,859,358 when including outlying U.S. territories.

== May 18, 1921 (Wednesday) ==
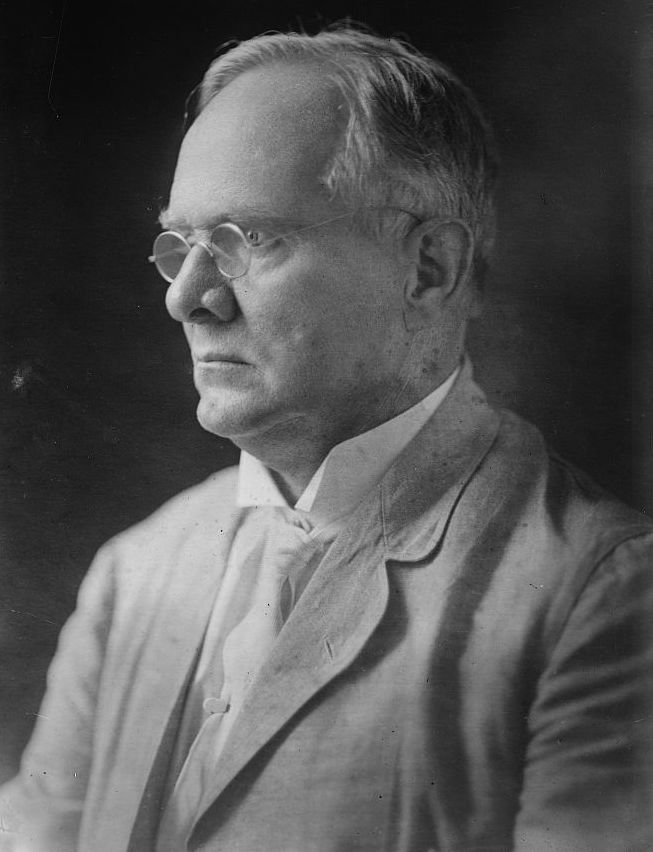
Former Florida Governor Sidney J. Catts

- Former Florida Governor Sidney J. Catts was indicted in the U.S. District Court at Pensacola for his policy of peonage (forced servitude to pay a debt) for African Americans under his employ. According to the indictment, Catts used his power of pardon to release two Black men from the Florida state prison camp and had them transferred to his plantation in Walton County for involuntary servitude.
- Born: Patrick Dennis (pen name for Edward Everett Tanner III), American author; in Chicago (d. 1976)
- Died: Franklin K. Lane, 56, U.S. Secretary of the Interior from 1913 to 1920, died from heart disease following surgery.(b. 1864)

== May 19, 1921 (Thursday) ==
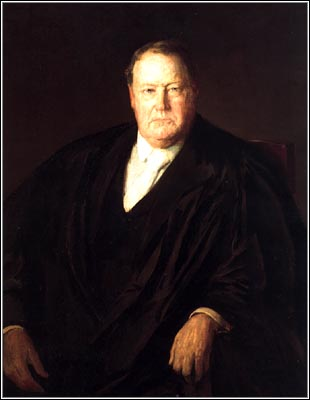
Chief Justice of the U.S. Supreme Court Edward Douglass White

- U.S. President Warren G. Harding signed the Emergency Quota Act, also known as the Dillingham Immigration Bill, into law, limiting annual immigration from individual nations to no more than the number of people who had immigrated to America from those nations in 1910.
- The first electrically propelled American ship, the Eclipse, arrived back in New York after a successful 26,500 miles (42,600 km) voyage on electric power.
- The Republic of China filed a protest against the United Kingdom after the UK elected to renew the Anglo-Japanese alliance, which had been set to expire on July 1.
- Marie Curie was presented the Gold Medal of the National Institute of Social Sciences at a ceremony in New York.
- Died: Edward Douglass White, 75, Chief Justice of the United States since 1910, died of a heart attack (b. 1845)

== May 20, 1921 (Friday) ==
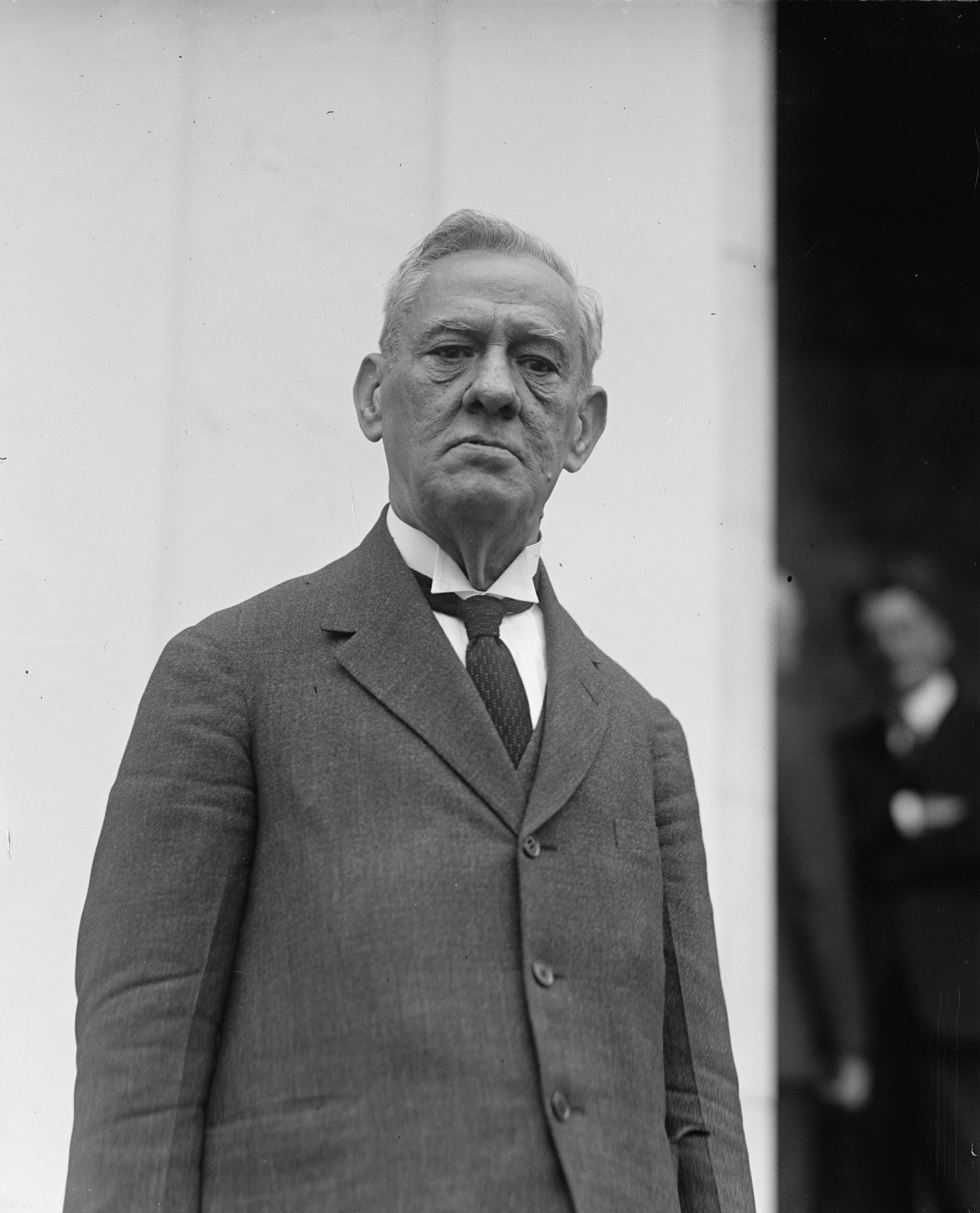
Cuban President Alfredo Zayas

- Dr. Alfredo Zayas was inaugurated as the President of Cuba.
- Mingo County, West Virginia was placed under martial law by West Virginia's Governor Ephraim F. Morgan.

== May 21, 1921 (Saturday) ==
- Wonder Bread, one of the most popular brands of white bread sold in North America, was introduced by the Taggart Baking Company of Indianapolis after a promotion in newspaper ads and flyers that simply had the word "WONDER" and poems that gave no clue about what the "wonder" was.
- Born:
  - Andrei Sakharov, Soviet Russian physicist, dissident and peace campaigner, awarded the Nobel Peace Prize in 1975; in Moscow(d. 1989)
  - Prabhat Ranjan Sarkar, Indian spiritual guru and Bengali language musical composer; in Jamalpur, Bihar and Orissa Province, British India (now in India's Bihar state) (d. 1990)

== May 22, 1921 (Sunday) ==
- Shuffle Along, the first musical revue to be written and performed by African Americans, was premiered on Broadway. With music and lyrics by Noble Sissle and Eubie Blake, the show introduced the hit song "I'm Just Wild About Harry" and opened at the David Belasco Theater.

== May 23, 1921 (Monday) ==
- The Leipzig War Crimes Trials opened in Germany, starting with the trial of Sergeant Karl Heynen, the commandant of a prisoner of war camp in Münstereins in Westphalia, for his brutal treatment of British POWs, 16 of whom appeared as witnesses for the prosecution. According to a report from the scene, "it was the first time the former soldiers had seen their tormentor since 1915."
- Rioting broke out at Alexandria in Egypt, with 48 people killed and 191 injured before police suppressed the violence. The fighting had broken out on Sunday night when, according to an Associated Press report, "trouble started between low-class Greeks and natives on Anastasia Street from an unknown cause. The indiscriminate fighting and revolver shooting there spread to other districts.
- Born: Humphrey Lyttelton, English jazz musician and broadcaster; in Eton, Berkshire (d. 2008)

== May 24, 1921 (Tuesday) ==
- In Northern Ireland's first general election, the Ulster Unionist Party won a two-thirds majority of votes cast and almost three-quarters of the 52 seats in the new Parliament of Northern Ireland. The voting was held under the new Home Rule Act, which provided for separate parliaments for the Protestant counties in the north and the Roman Catholic counties in the south.
- U.S. Navy Rear Admiral Samuel Robison was appointed as the U.S. Military Governor of Santo Domingo, now the Dominican Republic, which was under American occupation and administration.

== May 25, 1921 (Wednesday) ==
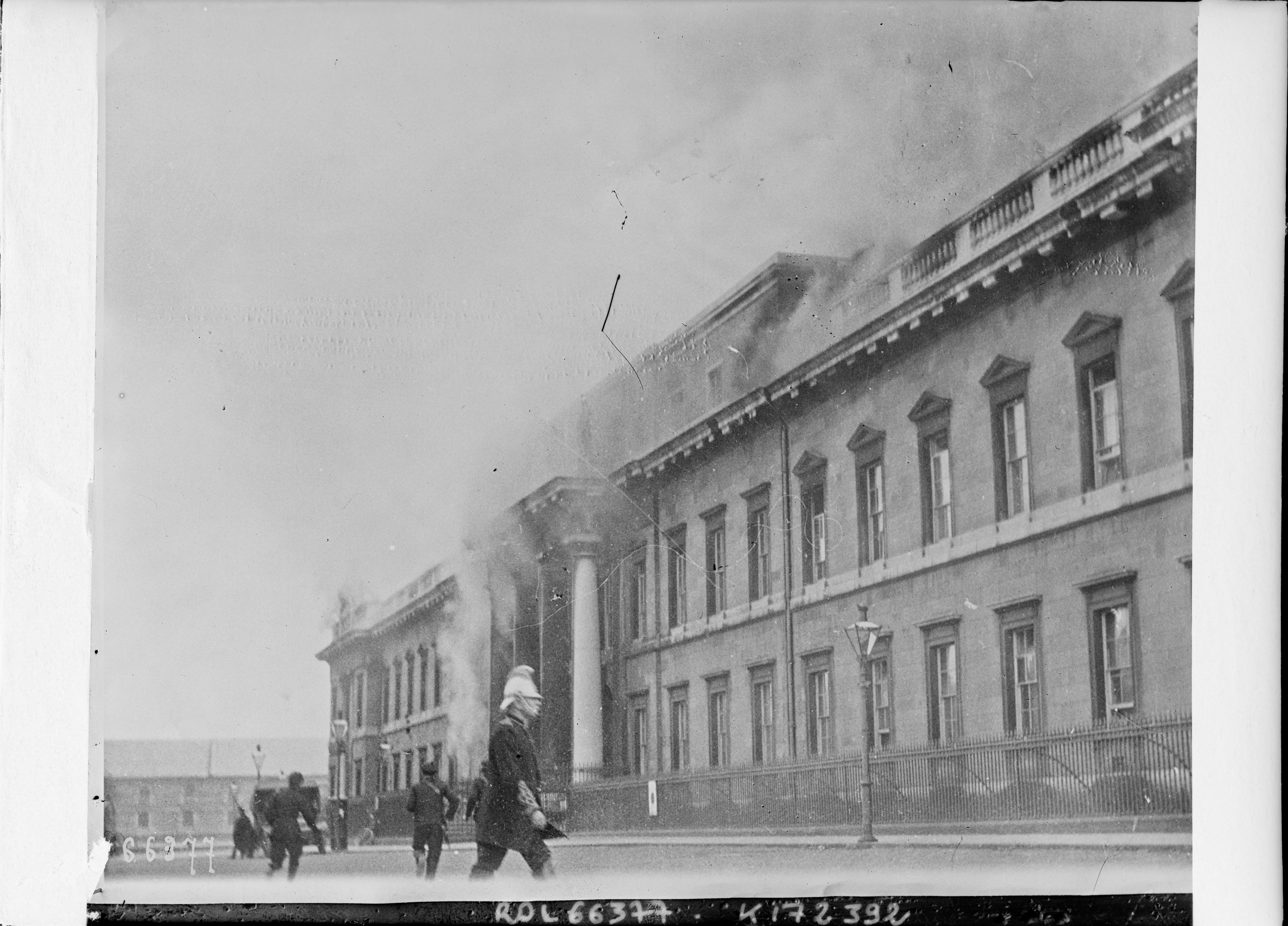
Fire at the Custom House

*The Irish Republican Army occupied and burned the Custom House, Dublin. The violence resulted in the deaths of five Republicans, and the capture of another 80 by the British Army.

- Born: Hal David, American lyricist; in New York City (d. 2012)
- Died: Émile Combes, 85, Prime Minister of France from 1902 to 1905 (b. 1835)

== May 26, 1921 (Thursday) ==
- France's Prime Minister Aristide Briand won a vote of confidence, 403 to 163, as a test of his policy of moderation toward Germany.
- In one of Germany's first war crimes convictions, under trials held at Leipzig since Germany had signed the Treaty of Versailles, a German court convicted a former Army sergeant and imposed a ten-month sentence.
- A general strike was proclaimed in Norway, in support of seamen threatened with a 30% wage cut.

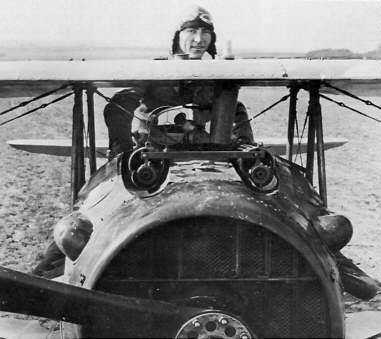
American aviator Eddie Rickenbacker

- American aviator Eddie Rickenbacker narrowly escaped getting killed when his airplane crashed in Cheyenne, Wyoming, while he was attempting a transcontinental flight. Rickenbacker had departed from Redwood City, California at 8:32 in the morning and, while over Reno, Nevada and Salt Lake City, Utah, he dropped leaflets over both cities, each a copy of a Memorial Day address made by the leader of the American Legion. Though prepared for a 24-hour flight to Washington, D.C., with 330 US gallons (1,200 L; 270 imp gal) of gasoline and 30 gallons of oil, Rickenbacker experienced trouble as he approached the Cheyenne Airport and his airplane flipped over on a hard landing. Using another plane, Rickenbacker completed his flight two days later.

== May 27, 1921 (Friday) ==
- The discovery of the body of Anna Brown in a ravine in Osage County, Oklahoma, United States, led to a large-scale murder investigation of the Osage Indian murders, potentially involving hundreds of victims over a twenty-year period.
- The state of emergency in the United Kingdom was renewed by royal proclamation in response to the continuation of the miners' strike.
- Menshevik soldiers who called themselves the "Kappell troops" in honor of the late Menshevik General Vladimir Kappel, seized control of the Bolshevik government in the eastern Russian port of Vladivostok, flying the Russian Imperial flag at public buildings. The Mensheviks had captured the city of Ussuriysk (at the time called Nikolsk) on May 21.
- The Emergency Tariff bill took effect immediately in the U.S. after being signed into law by President Harding.
- British Army troops arrived at Oppeln, the capital of Upper Silesia, in a region which had recently voted in a plebiscite to become part of Germany rather than Poland. The peacekeeping force, meant to prevent fighting between the German and Polish ethnic communities, brought with it airplanes, tanks and other armored equipment.

== May 28, 1921 (Saturday) ==
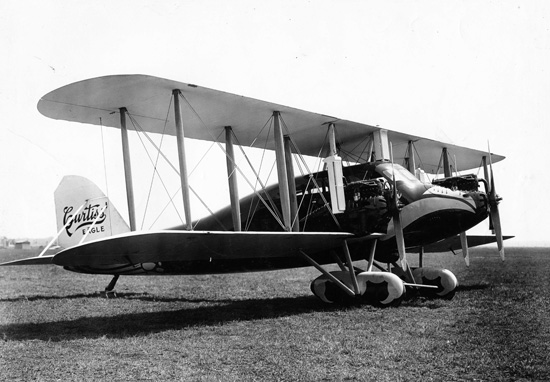
A Curtiss Eagle airliner

- All seven people aboard a U.S. Army Curtiss Eagle ambulance plane were killed in the deadliest airplane accident in American history up to that time. The tri-motor biplane was on its way from Langley Field near Hampton, Virginia and was on a 140 miles (230 km) trip to Bolling Field near Washington, D.C., flying when it crashed near Morgantown, Maryland during a violent thunderstorm, killing five U.S. Army officers and two civilians. Earlier in the day, two U.S. Representatives, Philip P. Campbell of Kansas and Joseph Walsh of Massachusetts, had accompanied Lieutenant Colonel Archie Miller and the pilot and mechanic of the plane to Langley, along with French Embassy official Guy de Lavergne, American Automobile Association chairman A. G. Batchelder and Curtiss Airplane Company sales manager Maurice Connolly. The two Congressmen and the French diplomat had been airsick and elected not to make the return flight, and two second lieutenants boarded the plane.
- The Farmer's Finance Corporation was incorporated in Delaware from the merger of several farmers' organizations and started with capital of $100,000,000.
- The Communist Party of Canada met for the first time, secretly, in a barn in Guelph, Ontario.

== May 29, 1921 (Sunday) ==
- Voters in the Salzburg province in Austria overwhelmingly voted in a plebiscite to be incorporated into Germany. The results of the election, which had been conducted despite warnings from Chancellor Michael Mayr and from the Allied Supreme Council, were not recognized by Austria as binding.
- The 11th Liège–Bastogne–Liège cycle race took place in Belgium and was won by Louis Mottiat.

== May 30, 1921 (Monday) ==
- Germany completed its latest annual payment of one billion gold marks to the Allied Reparations Commission, with a final deposit of twenty treasury notes worth ten million marks apiece, one day ahead of the scheduled May 31 deadline.
- The All-Russian Communist Party Congress approved a proposal by Party Secretary Vladimir Lenin for economic reform that included limited capitalism for small businesses. Finance for the Soviet government was made by a one-third tax on income, with peasants being assessed on the one-third value of their assets. The Party maintained state control of the transportation, textile, leather and salt industries.
- Ethnic fighting between Upper Silesian Germans and Poles took place at Beuthen, whose residents had voted in favor of remaining part of Germany in the recent plebiscite. There were 400 casualties. The city would become part of Poland after World War II and renamed Bytom.
- Seventeen underground miners at Meuselwitz in Germany were killed when a sudden downpour caused a flash flood of the Schnauder River.
- The Indianapolis 500 was won by Tommy Milton.
- Born: Jamie Uys (Jacobus Johannes Uys), South African film director; in Boksburg (d. 1996)

== May 31, 1921 (Tuesday) ==
- The Tulsa race massacre began as white mobs attacked black residents and businesses in the Greenwood District of Tulsa, Oklahoma, United States. 26 black and 10 white people were killed; it is estimated that 150–200 black and 50 white people were injured.
- The U.S. Railway Labor Board announced that railwaymen's wages would be reduced on July 1 by an average of 12%.
