= Edmund James Mills =

British chemist

Edmund James Mills FRS (1840–1921) was a British chemist. He was inventor of the brand-name disinfectant Parozone.

== Life ==
He was born in London on 8 December 1840. He was educated at the Grammar School in Cheltenham then studied at the Royal School of Mines back in London. The chemistry element of his course was taught at the Royal College of Chemistry on Oxford Street. His fellow students included Herbert McLeod, who became a life-long friend. Mills graduated BSc in 1863 and gained a doctorate (DSc) in 1865. From 1861 he worked under Prof John Stenhouse, with colleagues also including William A. Tilden.

He was elected a Fellow of the Royal Society of London on 4 June 1874. He moved to Glasgow around 1876 as Professor of Chemistry. He initially lived at 2 Hillsborough Terrace in the Hillhead district.

His pupils at Glasgow included Arthur George Perkin.

In 1891 he discovered and published his creation of a new disinfectant whilst working as a Professor of Technical Chemistry at the Royal Technical College at 60 John Street in Glasgow. He was then living at 5 Hillhead Street. This product was named "Parozone" and transformed British domestic life in terms of cleaning clothes and disinfecting kitchens and bathrooms.

By 1911 the Parozone Co. Ltd was well-established and had its headquarters at 53 Bothwell Street in Glasgow City Centre.

Mills died at home in Acton on 21 April 1921. He was a Buddhist until his death.

The Parazone Company was bought by Jeyes Fluid in 1963 but retained its name.
