= Mehmet Nuri Efendi =

Mehmet Nuri Efendi (1885 – 7 April 1921) was an Ottoman mufti (Islamic scholar who is an interpreter or expounder of Islamic law) of the town of Bilecik, and is known for his support to the Turkish national movement and subsequent assassination by the Greeks in 1921 during the Greco-Turkish War (1919–22). A tomb was built for him in 1996.

== Life and murder ==
Mehmet Nuri Efendi was born in Şahinler village of Bilecik/Gölpazarı. He became the müftü of Bilecik in 1912 and continued in this function till his death. During the Armenian Genocide, in July 1916, at which time he held the rank of captain of the Ottoman gendarmerie, Nuri Efendi participated in the massacre of two thousand five hundred Armenian soldier-workers, interned at the medrese at Sıvas. The Armenians were taken to the outskirts of the town and are killed between Sarkışla and Gemerek.

During the Greco-Turkish War (1919–22) he took an active role in the local Turkish national movement. As the müftü of Bilecik he recognized the fatwa of Ankara as legitimate. This fatwa was supportive of the Turkish nationalists based in Ankara. After the Greeks occupied Bilecik he moved to a nearby village from which he regularly informed Ankara of the events.

On 7 April 1921, he traveled while being armed together with an unarmed friend but he was ambushed near the village of Deresakarı by a Greek patrol and killed. His body was buried in the village graveyard. His hometown of Bilecik was also burned by the Greeks during the same month. In 1996 a tomb was built for him which is a site of local commemoration. He was married and had two children his family took the surname of Kırıkkanat (Broken wing).
