= Philip Bernatz =

American surgeon (1921–2010)

- Born: April 18, 1921; Decorah, Iowa
- Died: October 6, 2010 (age 89); Rochester, Minnesota
- Citizenship: US
- Education: University of Iowa, University of Minnesota
- Known for: Research in Surgery; Originator of the "Bernatz Classification" of thymomas; Director of the American Board of Thoracic Surgery 1977-1983
- Spouses: Marilyn & Corene
- Awards: University of Iowa Distinguished Alumni Award 1998; Several military awards (see below)
- Scientific career
- Fields: Medicine & Surgery

Philip Eugene Bernatz (April 18, 1921 – October 6, 2010) was an eminent American physician and thoracic surgeon at the Mayo Clinic, and an international authority on the diagnosis and treatment of thymoma and other tumors of the chest.

== Life ==
Bernatz was born on April 18, 1921, in Decorah, Iowa, as one of four children of Frank and Martha (née Hanson) Bernatz, and he died on October 6, 2010, aged 89, in Rochester, Minnesota.

== Education and military service ==
Bernatz was educated in public schools in Decorah, and he entered the University of Iowa (UI) in 1939. Bernatz received his B.A. degree as a member of Phi Beta Kappa in 1942, and was then enrolled in an accelerated wartime medical school curriculum at UI. He was awarded the M.D. in 1944 after being inducted into the Alpha Omega Alpha honor society. Bernatz immediately received a military commission as a lieutenant (junior grade) (O2) in the U.S. Navy Medical Corps, and he served overseas as a general medical officer in combat zones in the Pacific theater of operations. Bernatz returned to the United States after cessation of hostilities at the end of 1945 to continue his postgraduate medical education. However, that experience was interrupted in 1952 when he was recalled to active duty in the Navy during the Korean War. He served an additional 24 months as a naval surgeon in Korea, completing his tour of duty in 1954 at the rank of lieutenant commander (O4). Bernatz was awarded the Asiatic-Pacific Campaign Medal; the World War II Victory Medal; the Korean Service Medal; and the Korean Defense Service Medal.

Asiatic-Pacific Campaign ribbon

World War II Victory Medal ribbon

Korean Service Medal ribbon

Korean Defense Service ribbon

== Postgraduate training ==
Following World War II, Bernatz was accepted into the surgery residency program at the Mayo Clinic and Mayo Graduate School of Medicine in Rochester, Minnesota. He went on to pursue subspecialty fellowship training in thoracic surgery, a field that was developing rapidly in the 1950s. Bernatz earned a Master of Science degree in that discipline from the University of Minnesota, and was appointed to the consulting staff at Mayo in 1955.

== Work on thymoma ==
Bernatz rapidly acquired clinical experience with the treatment of thymoma, a potentially-aggressive mediastinal neoplasm which can be associated with myasthenia gravis and other paraneoplastic syndromes.

Together with Edward Harrison, a pathologist, and Oscar Clagett, another thoracic surgeon, Bernatz studied accrued clinicopathologic data from the management of more than 100 patients with thymoma. That information formed the substrate for creation of the first practical histopathologic categorization of thymoma in 1961, an approach that is still in use today as the "Bernatz classification." Additional studies were done throughout the next two decades on factors that influence the prognosis of patients with thymoma.

== Other professional achievements ==
Bernatz lectured actively and internationally on the surgery of the thymus, in the latter part of the twentieth century. He served as director of the American Board of Thoracic Surgery from 1977 to 1983, and was named the Stuart Harrington (S. W. Harrington) Professor of Surgery in the Mayo Medical School in 1981. Bernatz also served two terms as president of the Mayo Clinic. During his 45-year career, Bernatz authored or coauthored more than 150 peer-reviewed papers in the medical literature, as well as several books and book chapters on thoracic surgery. Despite his professional preeminence, he was known as a thoughtful, kind, and modest individual who supported the academic endeavors of many young physicians.

== Personal information ==
Bernatz was married twice. His first wife, Marilyn, predeceased him in the early 1980s, and his second wife, Corene, survived him. He had three children and seven grandchildren.
