= James H. Jones (North Carolina politician) =

Servant and politician

James Henry Jones (died April 8, 1921) was a personal servant, coachman, contractor, deputy sheriff, firefighter, and courier. He worked for Jefferson Davis and served as an alderman in Raleigh, North Carolina. He was a Republican.

He was a delegate to the 1865 Colored Men's Convention held in Raleigh and served in the Union League. He married and had two sons.
