= Maura McNiel =

American activist (1921–2020)

- Born: April 11, 1921
- Died: July 18, 2020 (aged 99)
- Education: University of Minnesota
- Organization(s): National Organization for Women, People for the American Way

Maura McNiel (April 11, 1921 – July 18, 2020) was an American feminist whose actions paved the way for women's studies, modern social work, advocacy on behalf of abused women, promotion of the Equal Rights Amendment, and passage of Title IX. McNiel was active for over forty years in the Dallas women's movement.

== Early life ==
Maura McNiel was born in Minneapolis, Minnesota on April 11, 1921, where she learned the importance of individual rights from the integration of Minneapolis area schools. In 1941, she attended University of Minnesota in Minneapolis. Moving to the Dallas area in the early 1950s, she became active within Dallas political and feminist groups, and was instrumental in the founding of the Women's Center of Dallas (now closed).

An ardent and early adopter of feminism in the 1960s, McNiel joined several women's groups focused on expanding women's roles and eliminating prevalent stereotypes. She became a member of the National Organization for Women and People for the American Way, seeking to expand her opportunities in the working world as a recent college graduate. Growing up in the 1950s and 1960s, McNiel witnessed changes like desegregation, which motivated her to improve the rights and benefits of the disenfranchised.

== Personal life ==
She married Thomas H. McNiel on February 1, 1952; they were divorced in Dallas on July 16, 1991.

== Involvement in Dallas politics ==
McNiel became very involved in the Dallas feminist movement in the late 1960s through the 1980s. Her involvement in Women for Change, the Domestic Violence Interaction Alliance of Dallas (DVIA), and EXPLORE — a women's identity group — expanded her interest in local politics. McNiel actively lobbied in Dallas City Hall for the rights and protections of battered women, which led to the creation of the Women's Center of Dallas — a resource for local women, most notably financial assistance, legal assistance, housing, and job training to victims of domestic violence. The Women's Center in Dallas was modeled after established organizations nationwide which acted as a means to remove battered women from troubled homes, and into a safe haven of their own.

== Involvement in national politics ==
Maura McNiel also worked for the passage of the Equal Rights Amendment of 1972 by speaking at local assemblies and rallies across Texas, However, the amendment fell three short of the number of states needed to ratify it. McNiel participated in other campaigns that proved more successful, such as the passage of Title IX in 1972. While not providing the blanket coverage, the Equal Rights Amendment would have, Title IX did grant the rights of educational freedom for women that would have resounding repercussions, expanding into the creation of more women's sports teams and athletic scholarships at the collegiate level.

== Awards ==
- In 1978, McNiel won the Women Helping Women award from the Women's Center of Dallas.
- In 1984, the Women Helping Women awards were renamed "The Maura's" in honor of McNiel's contributions to the advancement of women in society.
- In 1985, McNiel was nominated for admission into the Texas Women's Hall of Fame.
- In 1985, the Women's Center of Dallas renamed their annual Women Helping Women awards to the honorary Maura Women Helping Women awards.

== Death ==
She died on July 18, 2020, aged 99.

== See also ==
- History of feminism
- History of women in the United States
