= P.W. Chavers =

- Born: 1876; Columbus, Ohio
- Died: 1933 (aged 56–57)
- Spouse: Millie Calloway
- Children: Helen Madrue Chavers

P.W. Chavers (1876–1933) born Pearl William Chavers, was a banker, entrepreneur, industrialist, philanthropist, African-American journalist, and real estate developer in Chicago, Illinois. He devoted his life to the establishment of a black economy in Chicago, Illinois and in Columbus, Ohio.

He started the first National Bank in Chicago for African Americans called the Douglass Bank was the author of a Congressional Bill introduced in 1924 to provide Federal guarantee of bank deposits, known today as the Federal Deposit Insurance Corporation.

== Early life ==
Chavers was born in Columbus, Ohio, where his father died when he was a young boy, and at an early age he became an entrepreneur. He worked to help his mother and family financially. He was known to be an ambitious young man. He invested in newspapers by purchasing large supplies of newspapers and set up routes for other boys and make a profit from his investment. He attended Hudson College a business school in Columbus, Ohio. Where he learned how to structure a business, how to form a corporation, and how to market and use stocks and bonds. In 1900 he attended the 1900 Republican National Convention, and met Booker T. Washington.

== Career ==
P.W.'s first enterprise after graduation from Hudson College was the founding of the Columbus Standard newspaper. He was the founder and editor. He advocated for black business development, black voting power, self-help, and industry. The Columbus Standard was later renamed The Ohio Standard World. The Columbus Standard was an African American weekly newspaper from 1898 to 1901.

In 1905 Chavers started a women's garment factory in Columbus, Ohio. In 1917 he moved his garment factory to Chicago, Illinois. In 1907 he organized the Lincoln Ohio Industrial Training School for Colored Youth.

After the Red Summer of 1919 and growing bank movement within the African American community, Chavers founded the first nationally chartered Black bank, the Douglass National Bank that received its charter on June 27, 1922. The bank opened on June 29, 1922, after securing the charter in Washington, D.C., a few days prior. Anthony Overton was the president of the bank and the board. There were other Black owned banks in Chicago at the time including the bank owned Jesse Binga who founded the first privately owned African-American bank in Chicago in 1908. The bank later became the Binga State Bank in 1921. The Douglass National Bank and the Binga State Bank became the two most prominent Black banks owned by and servicing the Black Belt of Chicago before the Wall Street crash of 1929.

In 1908 he wrote, "Conditions that Confront the Colored Race".

In 1926 P.W. Chavers purchased 6,000 acres of land in Langlade County, Wisconsin to create a respite for urban children living in slums. After the 1929 Wall Street economic crash it became difficult for Camp Madrue to survive the economic crash. In June 1930 the economic condition had worsened. In 1930 the Citizen Trust and Savings Bank which funded Chavers land purchase closed. The bank closed due to a "run on the bank", by depositors that feared losing their money. The run on the bank depleted the bank's reserves.

== Legacy ==
In 1987 Madrue Chavers-Wright his daughter wrote a family biography called "The Guarantee" which documents the life of her father and family.

== See also ==
- Chicago Black Renaissance
- Chicago Race Riot of 1919
- Great Migration (African American)
- History of Chicago
- Political history of Chicago
- Racial segregation in the United States
- History of African Americans in Chicago
