= 1924 VPI Gobblers football team =

American college football season

1924 VPI Gobblers football
- Conference: Southern Conference
- Record: 4–2–3 (2–2–3 SoCon)
- Head coach: B. C. Cubbage (4th season)
- Captains: Samuel Oscar Graham; Joseph Henry Moran
- Home stadium: Miles Field

1924 Southern Conference football standings
	Conf.					Overall
Team	W		L		T	W		L		T
Alabama $	5	–	0	–	0	8	–	1	–	0
Florida	2	–	0	–	1	6	–	2	–	2
Georgia	5	–	1	–	0	7	–	3	–	0
Tulane	4	–	1	–	0	8	–	1	–	0
Washington and Lee	4	–	1	–	1	6	–	3	–	1
South Carolina	3	–	2	–	0	7	–	3	–	0
Sewanee *	3	–	2	–	0	6	–	4	–	0
Mississippi A&M	3	–	2	–	0	5	–	4	–	0
Virginia	3	–	2	–	0	5	–	4	–	0
Georgia Tech	3	–	2	–	1	5	–	3	–	1
Vanderbilt *	3	–	3	–	0	6	–	3	–	1
VPI	2	–	2	–	3	4	–	2	–	3
VMI	2	–	3	–	1	6	–	3	–	1
Kentucky	2	–	3	–	0	4	–	5	–	0
North Carolina	2	–	3	–	0	4	–	5	–	0
Auburn	2	–	4	–	1	4	–	4	–	1
Maryland	1	–	2	–	1	3	–	3	–	3
NC State	1	–	4	–	1	2	–	4	–	2
LSU	0	–	3	–	0	5	–	4	–	0
Ole Miss	0	–	3	–	0	4	–	5	–	0
Clemson	0	–	3	–	0	2	–	6	–	0
Tennessee	0	–	4	–	0	3	–	5	–	0
$ – Conference champion; * – co-member of SIAA

The 1924 VPI Gobblers football team represented Virginia Polytechnic Institute in the 1924 college football season. The team was led by their head coach B. C. Cubbage and finished with a record of four wins, two losses and three ties (4–2–3).

== Schedule ==
Date	Time	Opponent	Site	Result	Attendance	Source
September 27		Richmond*	Miles Field; Blacksburg, VA	W 28–0		
October 4		Hampden–Sydney*	Miles Field; Blacksburg, VA	W 10–0		
October 11		vs. Auburn	Mayo Island Park; Richmond, VA	T 0–0	5,000–7,000	
October 18	2:30 p.m.	vs. Maryland	Central High School; Washington, DC	W 12–0		
October 25		vs. Washington and Lee	Lynchburg Fair Grounds; Lynchburg, VA	T 0–0	7,000	
November 1	11:00 a.m.	at Clemson	Riggs Field; Calhoun, SC	W 50–6		
November 8		at NC State	Riddick Stadium; Raleigh, NC	L 3–6		
November 15		Virginia	Miles Field; Blacksburg, VA (rivalry)	L 0–6		
November 27	2:15 p.m.	vs. VMI	Maher Field; Roanoke, VA (rivalry)	T 0–0	15,000	
*Non-conference game

== Before the season ==
The 1923 VPI Gobblers football team compiled a 6–3 record and were led by B. C. Cubbage in his third season as head coach.

== Game summaries ==
=== Richmond ===
Richmond vs. VPI

Team	1	2	3	4	Total
Richmond	0	0	0	0	0
• VPI	7	7	7	7	28

- Date: September 27, 1924
- Location: Miles Field
  Blacksburg, VA
- Referee: Ernest Sampson (St. Albans)

VPI's first game of the season was a victory over Richmond at Miles Field.

The starting lineup for VPI was: Greene (left end), Graham (left tackle), Frey (left guard), Moran (center), Ray (right guard), Liebrecht (right tackle), Bailey (right end), Rutherford (quarterback), Esleeck (left halfback), DeLaBarre (right halfback), Moss (fullback). The substitutes were: Bird, Bond, Culbreth, Downing, Ellison, Ewing, Gaines, Handy, Holly, Jeffries, Kennedy, Krebs, Lineberry, Nutter, Roberts, Rousele, Talman, Williams and Wood.

The starting lineup for Richmond was: Taylor Sanford (left end), Roland Robins (left tackle), E. H. Witten (left guard), Lee Minter (center), Basil Minter (right guard), W. S. Bentley (right tackle), Claude Reams (right end), Alfred Newcomb (quarterback), William McCorkle (left halfback), Edwin Savory (right halfback), Meyer Vitsky (fullback). The substitutes were: Charles Dillon, Dunsmore, Dorsey Fick, Virgil Goode, Reese, William Roper and Whitfield.

=== Hampden–Sydney ===
Hampden–Sydney vs. VPI

Team	1	2	3	4	Total
HS	0	0	0	0	0
• VPI	3	7	0	0	10

- Date: October 4, 1924
- Location: Miles Field
  Blacksburg, VA
- Referee: Izard (W&L)

After their victory over Richmond, VPI played Hampden–Sydney College at Miles Field.

The starting lineup for VPI was: Greene (left end), Graham (left tackle), Frey (left guard), Moran (center), Ray (right guard), Liebrecht (right tackle), Bailey (right end), Esleeck (quarterback), Rutherford (left halfback), DeLaBarre (right halfback), Moss (fullback). The substitutes were: Bird, Bond, Culbreth, Downing, Gaines, Handy, Holly, Jeffries, Kennedy, Krebs, Nutter, Talman and Williams.

The starting lineup for Hampden–Sydney was: Simmerman (left end), Cecil Blankenship (left tackle), William Venable (left guard), Alfred Dudley (center), Edward Sager (right guard), Harry Myles (right tackle), Archie Jones (right end), Harold Dudley (quarterback), James Holladay (left halfback), David Squires (right halfback), William Richardson (fullback). The substitutes were: John Brinser, Gordon Clarke, Eldridge, Hagan, Maxwell Harper, Hurt, Mace, Edwin Ott, David Reveley and Richard Roberts.

=== Auburn ===
Auburn vs. VPI

Team	1	2	3	4	Total
Auburn	0	0	0	0	0
VPI	0	0	0	0	0

- Date: October 11, 1924
- Location: Mayo Island Park
  Richmond, VA
- Game attendance: 5,000–7,000
- Referee: Paul Magoffin

The starting lineup for VPI was: Greene (left end), Graham (left tackle), Frey (left guard), Moran (center), Ray (right guard), Liebrecht (right tackle), Bailey (right end), Roberts (quarterback), Esleeck (left halfback), Rutherford (right halfback), Moss (fullback). The substitutes were: DeLaBarre, Holly and Nutter.

The starting lineup for Auburn was: Buck Spinks (left end), W. P. Grisham (left tackle), E. McFadden (left guard), J. D. Lawrence (center), R. G. Brice (right guard), Sitz (right tackle), Clyde Pruitt (right end), S. Dean Petersen (quarterback), C. E. Greene (left halfback), Ernest Williams (right halfback), Herman Salter (fullback). The substitutes were: Edward Allen, McCully, George Ollinger, Geddes Self and Turner.

=== Maryland ===
Maryland vs. VPI

Team	1	2	3	4	Total
Maryland	0	0	0	0	0
• VPI	3	0	6	3	12

- Date: October 18, 1924
- Location: Central High School
  Washington, DC
- Game start: 2:30 p.m.
- Referee: Paul Magoffin

The starting lineup for VPI was: Nutter (left end), Graham (left tackle), Frey (left guard), Moran (center), Ray (right guard), Greene (right tackle), Bailey (right end), Roberts (quarterback), Rutherford (left halfback), Moss (right halfback), DeLaBarre (fullback). The substitutes were: Esleeck.

The starting lineup for Maryland was: Bill Supplee (left end), Walter Bromley (left tackle), Arthur Bonnet (left guard), Gomer Lewis (center), John Hough (right guard), Joseph C. Burger (right tackle), William Beatty (right end), Arthur Boyd (quarterback), Leland Cardwell (left halfback), George Heine (right halfback), Irving Hall (fullback). The substitutes were: Kenneth Coghill, Gilbert Dent, George Luckey, Alvin Parker and John Waters.

=== Washington and Lee ===
Washington & Lee vs. VPI

Team	1	2	3	4	Total
W&L	0	0	0	0	0
VPI	0	0	0	0	0

- Date: October 25, 1924
- Location: Lynchburg Fair Grounds
  Lynchburg, VA
- Game attendance: 7,000
- Referee: Paul Magoffin

The starting lineup for VPI was: Nutter (left end), Graham (left tackle), Frey (left guard), Moran (center), Ray (right guard), Greene (right tackle), Bailey (right end), Roberts (quarterback), Rutherford (left halfback), Esleeck (right halfback), DeLaBarre (fullback). The substitutes were: Holly, Krebs, Liebrecht and Moss.

The starting lineup for Washington and Lee was: Ralph Daves (left end), Warren E. Tilson (left tackle), Robert Holt (left guard), Charlie Van Horn (center), Merrell Budnick (right guard), Leslie Stemmons (right tackle), James Kay Thomas (right end), Henry Wilson (quarterback), William Palmer (left halfback), Ty Rauber (right halfback), Eddie Cameron (fullback). The substitutes were: Harry Dawson, Archie Hawkins, Henry McMillan and John McVay.

=== Clemson ===
VPI at Clemson

Team	1	2	3	4	Total
• VPI	7	23	7	13	50
Clemson	6	0	0	0	6

- Date: November 1, 1924
- Location: Riggs Field
  Calhoun, SC
- Game start: 11:00 a.m.
- Referee: Foster (Hampden-Sydney)

The starting lineup for VPI was: Holly (left end), Greene (left tackle), Frey (left guard), Moran (center), Ray (right guard), Graham (right tackle), Krebs (right end), Rutherford (quarterback), DeLaBarre (left halfback), Esleeck (right halfback), Moss (fullback). The substitutes were: Culbreth.

The starting lineup for Clemson was: Gary Finklea (left end), Red Wilson (left tackle), Sam Jackson (left guard), Fred Leitzey (center), Charlie Tennant (right guard), Kit Hane (right tackle), Wallace Roy (right end), Dan Stewart (quarterback), Pat Harmon (left halfback), Bratton Williams (right halfback), John Walker (fullback).

=== NC State ===
VPI at NC State

Team	1	2	3	4	Total
VPI	0	0	3	0	3
• NC State	0	0	0	6	6

- Date: November 8, 1924
- Location: Riddick Stadium
  Raleigh, NC
- Referee: Jack Gass

The starting lineup for VPI was: Holly (left end), Greene (left tackle), Ray (left guard), Moran (center), Frey (right guard), Graham (right tackle), Bailey (right end), Roberts (quarterback), Rutherford (left halfback), Esleeck (right halfback), Moss (fullback). The substitutes were: DeLaBarre, Jeffries and Krebs.

The starting lineup for NC State was: Samuel Wallis (left end), Cox (left tackle), William Beatty (left guard), Fred Logan (center), William White (right guard), G. Randolph Logan (right tackle), Joseph Ripple (right end), John Jeannette (quarterback), Alfred Johnston (left halfback), Walter Shuford (right halfback), Gaither Lassiter (fullback). The substitutes were: William Donnell, Henry Seawell and Charles Shuford.

=== Virginia ===
Virginia vs. VPI

Team	1	2	3	4	Total
• UVA	6	0	0	0	6
VPI	0	0	0	0	0

- Date: November 15, 1924
- Location: Miles Field
  Blacksburg, VA
- Referee: Paul Magoffin

The starting lineup for VPI was: Nutter (left end), Graham (left tackle), Frey (left guard), Moran (center), Ray (right guard), Greene (right tackle), Holly (right end), Roberts (quarterback), Rutherford (left halfback), DeLaBarre (right halfback), Moss (fullback). The substitutes were: Krebs and Liebrecht.

The starting lineup for Virginia was: Donald Darby (left end), Mul Holland (left tackle), Ashley Cockrill (left guard), James Reynolds (center), Charles Mackall (right guard), Reuben Hayman (right tackle), William Ahner (right end), A. Carter Diffey (quarterback), Samuel Maphis (left halfback), Curtis Cuddy (right halfback), Charles Frost (fullback). The substitutes were: Walter Brown, Edmond Laird and Theodore Phillips.

=== VMI ===
VMI vs. VPI

Team	1	2	3	4	Total
VMI	0	0	0	0	0
VPI	0	0	0	0	0

- Date: November 27, 1924
- Location: Maher Field
  Roanoke, VA
- Game start: 2:15 p.m.
- Game attendance: 15,000
- Game weather: "Ideal"
- Referee: Paul Magoffin

The starting lineup for VPI was: Nutter (left end), Graham (left tackle), Frey (left guard), Moran (center), Ray (right guard), Greene (right tackle), Bailey (right end), Roberts (quarterback), Rutherford (left halfback), DeLaBarre (right halfback), Moss (fullback). The substitutes were: Esleeck.

The starting lineup for VMI was: Newton Barkley (left end), Joseph Hope (left tackle), Thomas McCracken (left guard), Francis Ferguson (center), Carl Hammond (right guard), Frank Clements (right tackle), John Fain (right end), Paul Caldwell (quarterback), John Willis (left halfback), Karl Harmeling (right halfback), Windy White (fullback). The substitutes were: Robert Glendy.

== After the season ==
In December 1924, the VPI players elected Joseph Henry Moran as captain of the 1925 VPI Gobblers football team.

== Players ==
=== Roster ===
VPI 1924 roster
Samuel Bailey; Edward Arthur Bird; James Nurney Bond; Harry White Culbreth; Cecil DeLaBarre; Barney Downing; Ellison; Karl Esleeck; Albert Hugh Ewing; Z. F. Frey; Edwin Ruthven Gaines; Samuel Graham (Capt.); Arthur Greene; Edward Malvern Handy; Forrest Holly	John Mercer Jeffries; Kennedy; A. M. Krebs; Edward Liebrecht; H. H. Lineberry; Joseph Moran (Capt.); Jack Moss; Oscar Nutter; James Ray; Arthur Roberts; Rousele; Donald Rutherford; Hunter Summerfield Talman; Williams; Wood

=== Monogram Club members ===
Thirteen players received monograms for their participation on the 1924 VPI team.

Player	Hometown	Notes
Samuel Russell "Pop" Bailey	Farmville, Virginia	
Cecil Franzen DeLaBarre	Amherst, Nebraska	VA Commander (USNR) during World War I and II. DeLaBarre was also a Professor of Biology at VPI.
Z. E. Frey		
Samuel Oscar Graham	Hamilton, Virginia	
Arthur Trevilian Greene		
Forrest William Holly		
Edward Frank Liebrecht	Portsmouth, Virginia	
Joseph Henry Moran	Radford, Virginia	
Jack Wellford Moss	Roanoke, Virginia	United States Army Corps of Engineers. During World War II, he developed methods for crossing rice paddies in the Philippines in planning for the invasion of Japan. He was also the chief engineer in charge of plans, design and construction of Washington National Airport and Andrews Air Force Base.
Oscar Price Nutter	Blacksburg, Virginia	2nd Lieutenant, Army.
James Edward "Teddy" Ray	Fredericksburg, Virginia	
Arthur Roberts, Jr.	East Radford, Virginia	
Donald Hurt Rutherford	Bristol, Virginia	

== Coaching and training staff ==
- Head coach: B. C. Cubbage
- Manager: William Thomas Johns, Jr.
- Freshman head coach: Henry Redd
- Freshman assistant coach: Sherertz
- Freshman Manager: W. P. Wilkins
