= Pooley Hubert =

American football player and sports coach (1901–1978)

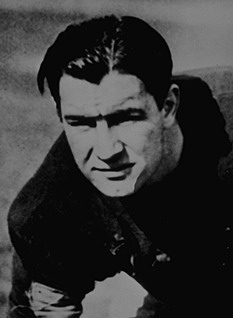

Biographical details
- Born: April 6, 1901; Meridian, Mississippi, U.S.
- Died: February 26, 1978 (aged 76); Augusta, Georgia, U.S.

Playing career
- 1922–1925: Alabama
- Positions: Fullback, quarterback

Coaching career (HC unless noted)

Football
- 1931–1936: Mississippi State Teachers
- 1937–1946: VMI

Basketball
- 1932–1936: Mississippi State Teachers
- 1936–1937: VMI
- 1942–1943: VMI

Baseball
- 1934–1935: Mississippi State Teachers

Head coaching record
- Overall: 69–69–13 (football); 35–49 (basketball); 3–12 (baseball)

Accomplishments and honors

Championships
- National (1925)

Awards
- Second-team All-American (1925); 2× All-Southern (1924, 1925)
- College Football Hall of Fame; Inducted in 1964 (profile)

Allison Thomas Stanislaus "Pooley" Hubert (April 6, 1901 – February 26, 1978) was an American football player and coach of football and basketball. Regarded as one of the South's greatest college football stars, he played quarterback for coach Wallace Wade's football teams at the University of Alabama from 1922 to 1925, leading Alabama to its first bowl game, the 1926 Rose Bowl, known as "the game that changed the South." Wade called him "undoubtedly one of the greatest football players of all time." Hubert later became the head football and basketball coach at the Mississippi State Teachers College—now known as University of Southern Mississippi—and Virginia Military Institute. He was inducted into the College Football Hall of Fame as a player in 1964.

== Early years ==
Pooley dropped out of high school to fight in World War I. He attended Missouri Military Academy in Mexico, Missouri, where he played football in the fall of 1920. Pooley earned a scholarship to play football at Princeton University, but arrived too late for the entrance exams. He tried a few other schools including Georgia Tech, for which he was one day late, before ultimately enrolling at the University of Alabama as a 20-year-old freshman. (Note: By the time he was a 24-year-old senior, his teammates had begun calling him "Papa Pooley" because he was so much older than them.)

== University of Alabama ==
Pooley initially played tackle in college, but was eventually put in the backfield where he excelled at fullback and quarterback. In those days of one-platoon football, players played on both offense, defense, and special teams. Not only was Hubert his team's best passer; he was also called the "greatest defensive back of all time." He wore number 10. He stood 5'10" and 190 pounds.

In six different games he scored at least three touchdowns, and had 35 in all. Zipp Newman wrote "No player deserves more credit for getting Alabama started up the ladder than Hubert—a football coach on the field. He wasn't fast, but he could pass, punt, buck for short yardage, and inspired his teammates. There have been few field generals in Pooley's class." Herman Stegeman remarked that with Hubert in the game Alabama had the advantage another team would have by a coach on the field of play.

=== 1924 ===
Pooley was captain of the 1924 team which netted Alabama's first conference championship, as members of the Southern Conference. It suffered a lone upset to Herb Covington-led Centre. Hubert scored in the 14–0 win over Sewanee. In the 20–0 win over Furman, Hubert scored twice, once on a 4-yard run and next on a 35-yard off-tackle run. He threw two touchdowns in the win over Georgia to secure the conference. At year's end Hubert was chosen for the composite All-Southern team.

Alabama's first Rose Bowl touchdown. Hubert is #10.

=== 1925 ===
Hubert played a key role in helping Alabama win the 1925 national championship. In the 7–0 win over Georgia Tech, the alumni recalled "Hubert played the greatest game of his career and was called the greatest defensive back ever to appear on Grant Field". Johnny Mack Brown returned a punt for the deciding touchdown, and Hubert cleared two Tech players out of the way. Hubert also passed for two touchdowns and ran for another in a 34–0 win against Florida. At year's end he was selected All-Southern.

The climax of his college career was the final game, defeating Wildcat Wilson-led Washington, 20–19, in the 1926 Rose Bowl. Hubert scored the first touchdown. He hit Brown on a 59-yard touchdown pass next to take the lead. He connected with Brown for yet another after a fumble. It is known as "the game that changed the South."

== Coaching career and later life ==
In 1931, Hubert was appointed head football coach at Mississippi State Teachers College—now known as University of Southern Mississippi—in Hattiesburg, Mississippi. From 1931 to 1936, he led Mississippi State Teachers to a 26–24–5 record. From 1937 to 1946, he was the head football coach at Virginia Military Institute (VMI) in Lexington, Virginia, where he compiled a 43–45–8 record. His 1938 squad set a school record with four ties. His best season came in 1940, when he went 7–2–1.

Hubert later coached football at Waynesboro High School in Waynesboro, Georgia, where he owned a peach orchard. He died on February 26, 1978, at a Veterans Administration Hospital in Augusta, Georgia, following a lengthy illness.

== Head coaching record ==
=== Football ===
| Year | Team | Overall | Conference | Standing | Bowl/playoffs |
|---|---|---|---|---|---|
Mississippi State Teachers Yellow Jackets (Southern Intercollegiate Athletic Association) (1931–1936)
| 1931 | Mississippi State Teachers | 2–5 | 2–4 | T–19th | |
| 1932 | Mississippi State Teachers | 5–4 | 3–3 | T–14th | |
| 1933 | Mississippi State Teachers | 3–5–2 | 2–4–1 | T–20th | |
| 1934 | Mississippi State Teachers | 3–4–2 | 2–3–1 | T–19th | |
| 1935 | Mississippi State Teachers | 6–4 | 5–1 | 8th | |
| 1936 | Mississippi State Teachers | 7–2–1 | 4–2–1 | T–11th | |
| Mississippi State Teachers: | | 26–24–5 | 18–17–3 | | |
VMI Keydets (Southern Conference) (1937–1946)
| 1937 | VMI | 5–5 | 5–2 | 5th | |
| 1938 | VMI | 6–1–4 | 4–0–3 | 4th | |
| 1939 | VMI | 6–3–1 | 3–1–1 | 6th | |
| 1940 | VMI | 7–2–1 | 3–2–1 | 7th | |
| 1941 | VMI | 4–6 | 4–2 | 6th | |
| 1942 | VMI | 3–5–1 | 2–4–1 | 10th | |
| 1943 | VMI | 2–6 | 1–3 | 8th | |
| 1944 | VMI | 1–8 | 1–5 | 8th | |
| 1945 | VMI | 5–4 | 3–2 | 6th | |
| 1946 | VMI | 4–5–1 | 3–3–1 | 8th | |
| VMI: | | 43–45–8 | 29–24–7 | | |
| Total: | | 69–69–13 | | | |

=== Basketball ===
Record table
| Season | Team | Overall | Conference | Standing | Postseason |
|---|---|---|---|---|---|
Mississippi State Teachers Yellow Jackets (Independent) (1932–1936)
| 1932–33 | Mississippi State Teachers | 4–10 | | | |
| 1933–34 | Mississippi State Teachers | 7–6 | | | |
| 1934–35 | Mississippi State Teachers | 3–9 | | | |
| 1935–36 | Mississippi State Teachers | 7–5 | | | |
| Mississippi State Teachers: | | 21–30 | | | |
VMI Keydets (Southern Conference) (1936–1937)
| 1936–37 | VMI | 6–11 | 5–11 | 13th | |
VMI Keydets (Southern Conference) (1942–1943)
| 1942–43 | VMI | 8–8 | 7–5 | 7th | |
| VMI: | | 14–19 | 12–16 | | |
| Total: | | 35–49 | | | |

== Bibliography ==
- Woodruff, Fuzzy (1928). A History of Southern Football 1890–1928. Vol. 3.
