= 1924 VMI Keydets football team =

American college football season

1924 VMI Keydets football
- Conference: Southern Conference
- Record: 6–3–1 (2–3–1 SoCon)
- Head coach: Blandy Clarkson (5th season)
- Captain: Carl Hammond
- Home stadium: Alumni Field

1924 Southern Conference football standings
| | Conf. | | | | | Overall |
| Team | W | | L | | T | W | | L | | T |
|---|---|---|---|---|---|---|---|---|---|---|
| Alabama $ | 5 | – | 0 | – | 0 | 8 | – | 1 | – | 0 |
| Florida | 2 | – | 0 | – | 1 | 6 | – | 2 | – | 2 |
| Georgia | 5 | – | 1 | – | 0 | 7 | – | 3 | – | 0 |
| Tulane | 4 | – | 1 | – | 0 | 8 | – | 1 | – | 0 |
| Washington and Lee | 4 | – | 1 | – | 1 | 6 | – | 3 | – | 1 |
| South Carolina | 3 | – | 2 | – | 0 | 7 | – | 3 | – | 0 |
| Sewanee * | 3 | – | 2 | – | 0 | 6 | – | 4 | – | 0 |
| Mississippi A&M | 3 | – | 2 | – | 0 | 5 | – | 4 | – | 0 |
| Virginia | 3 | – | 2 | – | 0 | 5 | – | 4 | – | 0 |
| Georgia Tech | 3 | – | 2 | – | 1 | 5 | – | 3 | – | 1 |
| Vanderbilt * | 3 | – | 3 | – | 0 | 6 | – | 3 | – | 1 |
| VPI | 2 | – | 2 | – | 3 | 4 | – | 2 | – | 3 |
| VMI | 2 | – | 3 | – | 1 | 6 | – | 3 | – | 1 |
| Kentucky | 2 | – | 3 | – | 0 | 4 | – | 5 | – | 0 |
| North Carolina | 2 | – | 3 | – | 0 | 4 | – | 5 | – | 0 |
| Auburn | 2 | – | 4 | – | 1 | 4 | – | 4 | – | 1 |
| Maryland | 1 | – | 2 | – | 1 | 3 | – | 3 | – | 3 |
| NC State | 1 | – | 4 | – | 1 | 2 | – | 4 | – | 2 |
| LSU | 0 | – | 3 | – | 0 | 5 | – | 4 | – | 0 |
| Ole Miss | 0 | – | 3 | – | 0 | 4 | – | 5 | – | 0 |
| Clemson | 0 | – | 3 | – | 0 | 2 | – | 6 | – | 0 |
| Tennessee | 0 | – | 4 | – | 0 | 3 | – | 5 | – | 0 |
$ – Conference champion; * – co-member of SIAA

The 1924 VMI Keydets football team was an American football team that represented the Virginia Military Institute (VMI) during the 1924 college football season as a member of the Southern Conference. In their fifth year under head coach Blandy Clarkson, the team compiled an overall record of 6–3–1.

== Schedule ==
| Date | Opponent | Site | Result | Source |
|---|---|---|---|---|
| September 20 | Wofford* | Alumni Field; Lexington, VA | W 33–0 | |
| September 27 | Emory & Henry* | Alumni Field; Lexington, VA | W 39–0 | |
| October 4 | at Georgia Tech | Grant Field; Atlanta, GA | L 0–3 | |
| October 11 | Roanoke* | Alumni Field; Lexington, VA | W 28–0 | |
| October 18 | Virginia | Alumni Field; Lexington, VA | L 0–13 | |
| October 25 | vs. NC State | Mayo Park; Richmond, VA | W 17–7 | |
| November 1 | Hampden–Sydney* | Alumni Field; Lexington, VA | W 25–0 | |
| November 8 | at North Carolina | Emerson Field; Chapel Hill, NC | L 0–3 | |
| November 15 | at Kentucky | Stoll Field; Lexington, KY | W 10–3 | |
| November 27 | vs. VPI | Maher Field; Roanoke, VA (rivalry) | T 0–0 | |
*Non-conference game
