= 1924 Mississippi A&M Aggies football team =

American college football season

1924 Mississippi A&M Aggies football
- Conference: Southern Conference
- Record: 5–4 (3–2 SoCon)
- Head coach: Earl Abell (2nd season)
- Home stadium: Scott Field

1924 Southern Conference football standings
	Conf.					Overall
Team	W		L		T	W		L		T
Alabama $	5	–	0	–	0	8	–	1	–	0
Florida	2	–	0	–	1	6	–	2	–	2
Georgia	5	–	1	–	0	7	–	3	–	0
Tulane	4	–	1	–	0	8	–	1	–	0
Washington and Lee	4	–	1	–	1	6	–	3	–	1
South Carolina	3	–	2	–	0	7	–	3	–	0
Sewanee *	3	–	2	–	0	6	–	4	–	0
Mississippi A&M	3	–	2	–	0	5	–	4	–	0
Virginia	3	–	2	–	0	5	–	4	–	0
Georgia Tech	3	–	2	–	1	5	–	3	–	1
Vanderbilt *	3	–	3	–	0	6	–	3	–	1
VPI	2	–	2	–	3	4	–	2	–	3
VMI	2	–	3	–	1	6	–	3	–	1
Kentucky	2	–	3	–	0	4	–	5	–	0
North Carolina	2	–	3	–	0	4	–	5	–	0
Auburn	2	–	4	–	1	4	–	4	–	1
Maryland	1	–	2	–	1	3	–	3	–	3
NC State	1	–	4	–	1	2	–	4	–	2
LSU	0	–	3	–	0	5	–	4	–	0
Ole Miss	0	–	3	–	0	4	–	5	–	0
Clemson	0	–	3	–	0	2	–	6	–	0
Tennessee	0	–	4	–	0	3	–	5	–	0
$ – Conference champion; * – co-member of SIAA

The 1924 Mississippi A&M Aggies football team was an American football team that represented the Agricultural and Mechanical College of the State of Mississippi (now known as Mississippi State University) as a member of the Southern Conference (SoCon) during the 1924 college football season. In their second season under head coach Earl Abell, Mississippi A&M compiled a 5–4 record.

== Schedule ==
Date	Time	Opponent	Site	Result	Attendance	Source
October 4		Millsaps*	Scott Field; Starkville, MS	W 28–7		
October 11		Ouachita Baptist*	Scott Field; Starkville, MS	L 0–12		
October 18		vs. Ole Miss	State Fairgrounds; Jackson, MS (rivlary)	W 20–0	8,000	
October 25		vs. Tennessee	Russwood Park; Memphis, TN	W 7–2	5,800	
November 1		at Tulane	Tulane Stadium; New Orleans, LA	W 14–6		
November 8		at Vanderbilt	Dudley Field; Nashville, TN	L 0–18		
November 15		Mississippi College*	Scott Field; Starkville, MS	W 7–6		
November 22		vs. Florida	Cramton Bowl; Montgomery, AL	L 0–27		
November 27	2:00 p.m.	at Washington University*	Francis Field; St. Louis, MO	L 3–12	5,000	
*Non-conference game; All times are in Central time
