= 1924 Washington and Lee Generals football team =

American college football season

1924 Washington and Lee Generals football
- Conference: Southern Conference
- Record: 6–3–1 (4–1–1 SoCon)
- Head coach: Jimmy DeHart (3rd season)
- Captain: W. E. Wilson
- Home stadium: Wilson Field

1924 Southern Conference football standings
	Conf.					Overall
Team	W		L		T	W		L		T
Alabama $	5	–	0	–	0	8	–	1	–	0
Florida	2	–	0	–	1	6	–	2	–	2
Georgia	5	–	1	–	0	7	–	3	–	0
Tulane	4	–	1	–	0	8	–	1	–	0
Washington and Lee	4	–	1	–	1	6	–	3	–	1
South Carolina	3	–	2	–	0	7	–	3	–	0
Sewanee *	3	–	2	–	0	6	–	4	–	0
Mississippi A&M	3	–	2	–	0	5	–	4	–	0
Virginia	3	–	2	–	0	5	–	4	–	0
Georgia Tech	3	–	2	–	1	5	–	3	–	1
Vanderbilt *	3	–	3	–	0	6	–	3	–	1
VPI	2	–	2	–	3	4	–	2	–	3
VMI	2	–	3	–	1	6	–	3	–	1
Kentucky	2	–	3	–	0	4	–	5	–	0
North Carolina	2	–	3	–	0	4	–	5	–	0
Auburn	2	–	4	–	1	4	–	4	–	1
Maryland	1	–	2	–	1	3	–	3	–	3
NC State	1	–	4	–	1	2	–	4	–	2
LSU	0	–	3	–	0	5	–	4	–	0
Ole Miss	0	–	3	–	0	4	–	5	–	0
Clemson	0	–	3	–	0	2	–	6	–	0
Tennessee	0	–	4	–	0	3	–	5	–	0
$ – Conference champion; * – co-member of SIAA

The 1924 Washington and Lee Generals football team was an American football team that represented Washington and Lee University as a member of the Southern Conference (SoCon) during the 1924 college football season. In their first third under head coach Jimmy DeHart, Washington and Lee compiled a 6–3–1 record. The team claimed a title of the South Atlantic States.

== Schedule ==
Date	Opponent	Site	Result	Source
September 27	Roanoke*	Wilson Field; Lexington, VA	W 34–0	
October 3	vs. Maryland	Central High School Stadium; Washington, DC	W 19–7	
October 11	Wake Forest*	Wilson Field; Lexington, VA	L 8–10	
October 18	at Kentucky	Stoll Field; Lexington, KY	W 10–7	
October 25	vs. VPI	Lynchburg Fair Grounds; Lynchburg, VA	T 0–0	
November 1	at Virginia	Lambeth Field; Charlottesville, VA	W 20–7	
November 8	The Citadel*	Wilson Field; Lexington, VA	W 32–7	
November 15	vs. West Virginia*	Laidley Field; Charleston, WV	L 0–6	
November 27	at NC State	Riddick Stadium; Raleigh, NC	W 34–0	
December 6	vs. Florida	Barrs Field; Jacksonville, FL	L 6–16	
*Non-conference game
