= 1924 Clemson Tigers football team =

American college football season

1924 Clemson Tigers football
- Conference: Southern Conference
- Record: 2–6 (0–3 SoCon)
- Head coach: Bud Saunders (2nd season)
- Captain: Charlie Robinson
- Home stadium: Riggs Field

1924 Southern Conference football standings
	Conf.					Overall
Team	W		L		T	W		L		T
Alabama $	5	–	0	–	0	8	–	1	–	0
Florida	2	–	0	–	1	6	–	2	–	2
Georgia	5	–	1	–	0	7	–	3	–	0
Tulane	4	–	1	–	0	8	–	1	–	0
Washington and Lee	4	–	1	–	1	6	–	3	–	1
South Carolina	3	–	2	–	0	7	–	3	–	0
Sewanee *	3	–	2	–	0	6	–	4	–	0
Mississippi A&M	3	–	2	–	0	5	–	4	–	0
Virginia	3	–	2	–	0	5	–	4	–	0
Georgia Tech	3	–	2	–	1	5	–	3	–	1
Vanderbilt *	3	–	3	–	0	6	–	3	–	1
VPI	2	–	2	–	3	4	–	2	–	3
VMI	2	–	3	–	1	6	–	3	–	1
Kentucky	2	–	3	–	0	4	–	5	–	0
North Carolina	2	–	3	–	0	4	–	5	–	0
Auburn	2	–	4	–	1	4	–	4	–	1
Maryland	1	–	2	–	1	3	–	3	–	3
NC State	1	–	4	–	1	2	–	4	–	2
LSU	0	–	3	–	0	5	–	4	–	0
Ole Miss	0	–	3	–	0	4	–	5	–	0
Clemson	0	–	3	–	0	2	–	6	–	0
Tennessee	0	–	4	–	0	3	–	5	–	0
$ – Conference champion; * – co-member of SIAA

The 1924 Clemson Tigers football team represented Clemson College—now known as Clemson University—as a member of the Southern Conference (SoCon) during the 1924 college football season. Led by second-year head coach Bud Saunders, the Tigers compiled an overall record of 2–6 with a mark of 0–3 in conference play, tying for 19th place in the SoCon.

== Schedule ==
Date	Opponent	Site	Result	Source
September 27	Elon*	Riggs Field; Calhoun, SC	W 60–0	
October 4	at Auburn	Drake Field; Auburn, AL (rivalry)	L 0–13	
October 11	Presbyterian*	Riggs Field; Calhoun, SC	W 14–0	
October 23	at South Carolina	State Fairgrounds; Columbia, SC (rivalry)	L 0–3	
November 1	VPI	Riggs Field; Calhoun, SC	L 6–50	
November 8	vs. Davidson*	Wearn Field; Charlotte, NC	L 0–7	
November 15	vs. The Citadel*	Anderson, SC	L 0–20	
November 27	Furman*	Riggs Field; Calhoun, SC	L 0–3	
*Non-conference game
