= 1924 Ole Miss Rebels football team =

American college football season

1924 Ole Miss Rebels football
- Conference: Southern Conference
- Record: 4–5 (0–3 SoCon)
- Head coach: Chester S. Barnard (1st season)
- Home stadium: Hemingway Stadium

1924 Southern Conference football standings
	Conf.					Overall
Team	W		L		T	W		L		T
Alabama $	5	–	0	–	0	8	–	1	–	0
Florida	2	–	0	–	1	6	–	2	–	2
Georgia	5	–	1	–	0	7	–	3	–	0
Tulane	4	–	1	–	0	8	–	1	–	0
Washington and Lee	4	–	1	–	1	6	–	3	–	1
South Carolina	3	–	2	–	0	7	–	3	–	0
Sewanee *	3	–	2	–	0	6	–	4	–	0
Mississippi A&M	3	–	2	–	0	5	–	4	–	0
Virginia	3	–	2	–	0	5	–	4	–	0
Georgia Tech	3	–	2	–	1	5	–	3	–	1
Vanderbilt *	3	–	3	–	0	6	–	3	–	1
VPI	2	–	2	–	3	4	–	2	–	3
VMI	2	–	3	–	1	6	–	3	–	1
Kentucky	2	–	3	–	0	4	–	5	–	0
North Carolina	2	–	3	–	0	4	–	5	–	0
Auburn	2	–	4	–	1	4	–	4	–	1
Maryland	1	–	2	–	1	3	–	3	–	3
NC State	1	–	4	–	1	2	–	4	–	2
LSU	0	–	3	–	0	5	–	4	–	0
Ole Miss	0	–	3	–	0	4	–	5	–	0
Clemson	0	–	3	–	0	2	–	6	–	0
Tennessee	0	–	4	–	0	3	–	5	–	0
$ – Conference champion; * – co-member of SIAA

The 1924 Ole Miss Rebels football team was an American football team that represented the University of Mississippi in the Southern Conference during the 1924 college football season. In its first and only season under head coach Chester S. Barnard, the team compiled a 4–5 record (0–3 against conference opponents). The team played its home games at Vaught–Hemingway Stadium in Oxford, Mississippi

== Schedule ==
Date	Opponent	Site	Result	Source
October 4	Jonesboro A&M*	Hemingway Stadium; Oxford, MS	W 10–7	
October 11	Southwestern (TN)*	Hemingway Stadium; Oxford, MS	W 7–0	
October 18	vs. Mississippi A&M	State Fairgrounds; Jackson, MS (rivalry)	L 0–20	
October 25	at Arkansas*	Kavanaugh Field; Little Rock, AR (rivalry)	L 0–20	
November 1	at Alabama	Cramton Bowl; Montgomery, AL (rivalry)	L 0–61	
November 8	vs. Sewanee	Russwood Park; Memphis, TN	L 0–21	
November 14	at Furman*	Manly Field; Greenville, SC	L 2–7	
November 22	Mississippi College*	Hemingway Stadium; Oxford, MS	W 10–6	
November 27	at Millsaps*	Jackson, MS	W 7–0	
*Non-conference game
