= 1924 Georgia Tech Golden Tornado football team =

American college football season

1924 Georgia Tech Golden Tornado football
- Conference: Southern Conference
- Record: 5–3–1 (3–2–1 SoCon)
- Head coach: William Alexander (5th season)
- Offensive scheme: Jump shift
- Captain: George Gardner
- Home stadium: Grant Field

Uniform
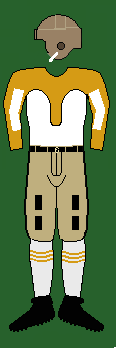

1924 Southern Conference football standings
	Conf.					Overall
Team	W		L		T	W		L		T
Alabama $	5	–	0	–	0	8	–	1	–	0
Florida	2	–	0	–	1	6	–	2	–	2
Georgia	5	–	1	–	0	7	–	3	–	0
Tulane	4	–	1	–	0	8	–	1	–	0
Washington and Lee	4	–	1	–	1	6	–	3	–	1
South Carolina	3	–	2	–	0	7	–	3	–	0
Sewanee *	3	–	2	–	0	6	–	4	–	0
Mississippi A&M	3	–	2	–	0	5	–	4	–	0
Virginia	3	–	2	–	0	5	–	4	–	0
Georgia Tech	3	–	2	–	1	5	–	3	–	1
Vanderbilt *	3	–	3	–	0	6	–	3	–	1
VPI	2	–	2	–	3	4	–	2	–	3
VMI	2	–	3	–	1	6	–	3	–	1
Kentucky	2	–	3	–	0	4	–	5	–	0
North Carolina	2	–	3	–	0	4	–	5	–	0
Auburn	2	–	4	–	1	4	–	4	–	1
Maryland	1	–	2	–	1	3	–	3	–	3
NC State	1	–	4	–	1	2	–	4	–	2
LSU	0	–	3	–	0	5	–	4	–	0
Ole Miss	0	–	3	–	0	4	–	5	–	0
Clemson	0	–	3	–	0	2	–	6	–	0
Tennessee	0	–	4	–	0	3	–	5	–	0
$ – Conference champion; * – co-member of SIAA

The 1924 Georgia Tech Golden Tornado football team (Note: Although Georgia Tech's teams are officially known as the "Yellow Jackets", northern writers called the team the "Golden Tornado" in 1917; the name was commonly used until 1928 and for many years afterwards as an alternate nickname. It may have been coined by Morgan Blake.) represented the Georgia Tech Golden Tornado of the Georgia Institute of Technology during the 1924 Southern Conference football season. The Tornado was coached by William Alexander in his fifth year as head coach, compiling a record of 5–3–1 record.

The Tornado defeated eastern power Penn State, and suffered losses to SoCon champion Alabama, national champion Notre Dame, and Vanderbilt, which defeated Tech in Atlanta for the first time since 1906.

Doug Wycoff was All-American.

== Schedule ==
Date	Opponent	Site	Result	Attendance	Source
September 27	Oglethorpe*	Grant Field; Atlanta, GA	W 19–0		
October 4	VMI	Grant Field; Atlanta, GA	W 3–0		
October 11	Florida	Grant Field; Atlanta, GA	T 7–7	20,000	
October 18	Penn State*	Grant Field; Atlanta, GA	W 15–13	22,000	
October 25	Alabama	Grant Field; Atlanta, GA (rivalry)	L 0-14		
November 1	at Notre Dame*	Cartier Field; South Bend, IN (rivalry)	L 3-34	24,000	
November 8	LSU	Grant Field; Atlanta, GA	W 28–7		
November 15	Vanderbilt	Grant Field; Atlanta, GA (rivalry)	L 0-3		
November 27	Auburn	Grant Field; Atlanta, GA (rivalry)	W 7–0		
*Non-conference game

== Game summaries ==
=== Oglethorpe ===
The season opened with a 19–0 defeat of the Southern Intercollegiate Athletic Association co-champion Oglethorpe Stormy Petrels.

=== VMI ===
VMI at Georgia Tech

Team	1	2	3	4	Total
VMI	0	0	0	0	0
• Ga. Tech	0	3	0	0	3

- Date: October 4
- Location: Grant Field
  Atlanta, GA
- Referee: Jogger Elcock

Tech edged VMI with an Ike Williams field goal.

The starting lineup was Merkle (left end), Usry (left tackle), Godwin (left guard), Poole (center), Carpenter (right guard), Gardner (right tackle), Nebelle (right end), Wilton (quarterback), Williams (left halfback), Reeves (right halfback), Wycoff (fullback).

=== Florida ===
Florida at Georgia Tech

Team	1	2	3	4	Total
Florida	0	7	0	0	7
Ga. Tech	7	0	0	0	7

- Date: October 11
- Location: Grant Field
  Atlanta, GA
- Referee: W. R. Tichenor

Tech and the Florida Gators fought to a 7–7 tie, the second Florida-Tech tie in two years.

Within the first few minutes, Tech scored when Gus Merkle launched at Edgar C. Jones, causing him to crash into the approaching Cy Williams and fumble. Doug Wycoff picked it up and ran 35 yards for the score. Florida once fumbled at Tech's 1-yard line. Again the Gators drove to the goal, and a Jones to Ark Newton pass tied the game.

The starting lineup was Merkle (left end), Usry (left tackle), Godwin (left guard), Poole (center), Carpenter (right guard), Gardner (right tackle), Nebelle (right end), Wilton (quarterback), Williams (left halfback), Vaughan Connelly (right halfback), Wycoff (fullback).

=== Penn State ===
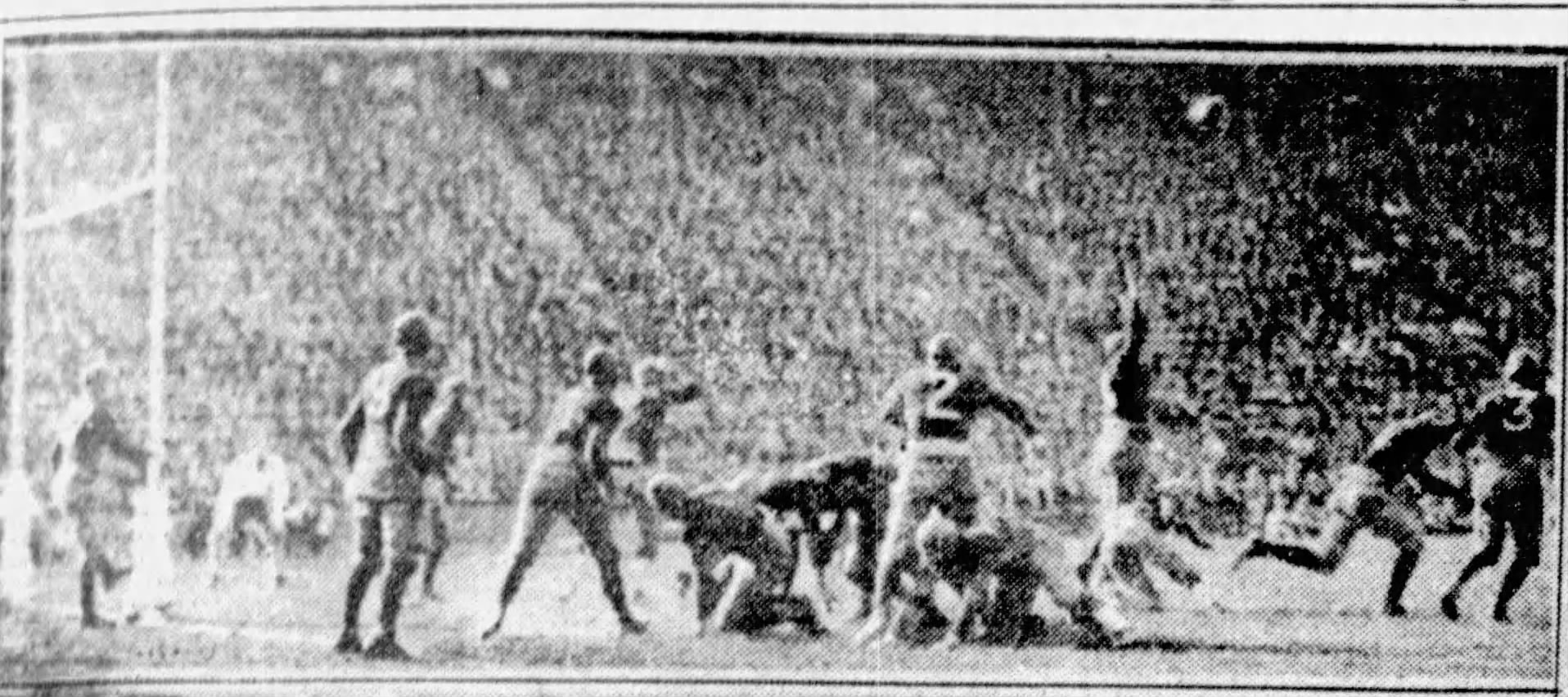
First field goal vs. Penn State by Williams

Penn State at Georgia Tech

Team	1	2	3	4	Total
Penn St.	0	0	0	13	13
• Ga. Tech	3	9	3	0	15

- Date: October 18
- Location: Grant Field
  Atlanta, Georgia
- Game attendance: 22,000
- Referee: C. J. McCarty (Germantown)

Tech upset the Penn State Nittany Lions 15–13. Ike William made two field goals, one in the first and the other in the third quarter. In the second quarter, Tech's Gardner picked up a fumble by Penn State's quarterback Baker, and raced 20 yards for a touchdown. and a safety made Tech's 15. Soon after, Tech gots its safety. In the final period, State staged a desperate comeback and scored two touchdowns.

The starting lineup was Merkle (left end), Usry (left tackle), Godwin (left guard), Glenn (center), Carpenter (right guard), Gardner (right tackle), Nebelle (right end), Moore (quarterback), Williams (left halfback), Reeves (right halfback), Wycoff (fullback).

=== Alabama ===
Alabama at Georgia Tech

Team	1	2	3	4	Total
• Alabama	0	7	0	7	14
Ga. Tech	0	0	0	0	0

- Date: October 25
- Location: Grant Field
  Atlanta, GA

Coach Wallace Wade's Alabama Crimson Tide defeated Tech 14–0, handing coach Alexander his first loss to a Southern team. Tech drove the ball to the Alabama 6 in the third with a chance to tie the game up but was stopped on 4th and 1.

The starting lineup was Marshall (left end), Usry (left tackle), Godwin (left guard), Poole (center), Carpenter (right guard), Tharpe (right tackle), Nabelle (right end), Moore (quarterback), Williams (left halfback), Reeves (right halfback), Wycoff (fullback).

=== Notre Dame ===
Tech lost to Knute Rockne's national champion Notre Dame Fighting Irish with the Four Horsemen 34–3. The starting lineup was Nabelle (left end), Gardner (left tackle), Carpenter (left guard), Poole (center), Godwin (right guard), Usry (right tackle), Marshall (right end), Wilton (quarterback), Williams (left halfback), Connelly (right halfback), Wycoff (fullback).

=== LSU ===
Tech beat coach Mike Donahue's LSU Tigers 28–7. The starting lineup was King (left end), Usry (left tackle), Godwin (left guard), Poole (center), Forrester (right guard), Huffkines (right tackle), Gardner (right end), Wilton (quarterback), Williams (left halfback), Murray (right halfback), Wycoff (fullback).

=== Vanderbilt ===
Vanderbilt at Georgia Tech

Team	1	2	3	4	Total
• Vanderbilt	3	0	0	0	3
Ga. Tech	0	0	0	0	0

- Date: November 15
- Location: Grant Field
  Atlanta, Georgia

The Vanderbilt Commodores traveled to Atlanta followed by the largest crowd ever to accompany Vanderbilt on a trip, with five special sections. The lone score of the game could largely be credited to halfback Gil Reese. Vanderbilt elected to start the game with the wind at its back, hoping for an edge in punts which would lead to good field position early. Reese caught one of these punts in these exchanges on the fly and, noticing both of Tech's ends blocked to the ground, raced to within striking distance of the end zone. From there, Hek Wakefield made a drop kick. Wakefield was the star of the game; "He was death on returning punts and when he started around the ends the Tech stars groaned," recalls one account.

Georgia Tech's one chance to score came when fullback Douglas Wycoff missed a kick low, partially blocked by Vanderbilt. Hendrix attempted to recover but missed, and Georgia Tech retained possession at the 4-yard line. On first down, a snap from center missed Wycoff, and Vanderbilt fullback Tom Ryan recovered the ball at the 15-yard line, and later punted it away to safety. The game was a defensive scrap the rest of the way.

Gil Reese gained −15 yards rushing, and Wycoff was stopped all game. Bip Farnsworth was the Tornado's lone consistent ground gainer. The punting battle between Douglas Wycoff and Tom Ryan was one of the few noted features of the game. (Note: It was the first win for Vanderbilt in Atlanta since 1906.)

The starting lineup was King (left end), Usry (left tackle), Godwin (left guard), Poole (center), Carpenter (right guard), Gardner (right tackle), Nabelle (right end), Wilton (quarterback), Williams (left halfback), Murray (right halfback), Wycoff (fullback).

=== Auburn ===
Auburn at Georgia Tech

Team	1	2	3	4	Total
Auburn	0	0	0	0	0
• Ga. Tech	0	0	0	7	7

- Date: November 17
- Location: Grant Field
  Atlanta, Georgia

Tech beat rival Auburn 7–0. On the first play of the fourth quarter, Wycoff extended the ball over the goal line.

The starting lineup was King (left end), Usry (left tackle), Godwin (left guard), Poole (center), Carpenter (right guard), Gardner (right tackle), Nabelle (right end), S. Murray (quarterback), I. Williams (left halfback), Farnsworh (right halfback), Wycoff (fullback).

== Postseason ==
Doug Wycoff was selected first-team All-American by Lawrence Perry.

== Personnel ==
=== Depth chart ===
The following chart provides a visual depiction of Tech's lineup during the 1924 season with games started at the position reflected in parentheses. The chart mimics the offense after the jump shift has taken place.

LE
King (3)
Gus Merkle (3)
Johnny Marshall (1)
Nabelle (1)

LT	LG	C	RG	RT
Usry (7)	Walt Godwin (7)	Owen Pool (7)	Six Carpenter (6)	Gardner (5)
Gardner (1)	Six Carpenter (1)	Glenn (1)	Wally Forrester (1)	Huffines (1)
			Walt Godwin (1)	Mack Tharpe (1)
				Usry (1)

RE
Nabelle (6)
Gardner (1)
Johnny Marshall (1)

QB
Wilton (5)
Fred Moore (2)
Sam Murray (1)

RHB
Reeves (3)
Vaughan Connelly (2)
Sam Murray (2)
Bip Farnsworth (1)

FB
Doug Wycoff (8)

LHB
Ike Williams (8)
