= 1924 Alabama Crimson Tide football team =

American college football season

1924 Alabama Crimson Tide football
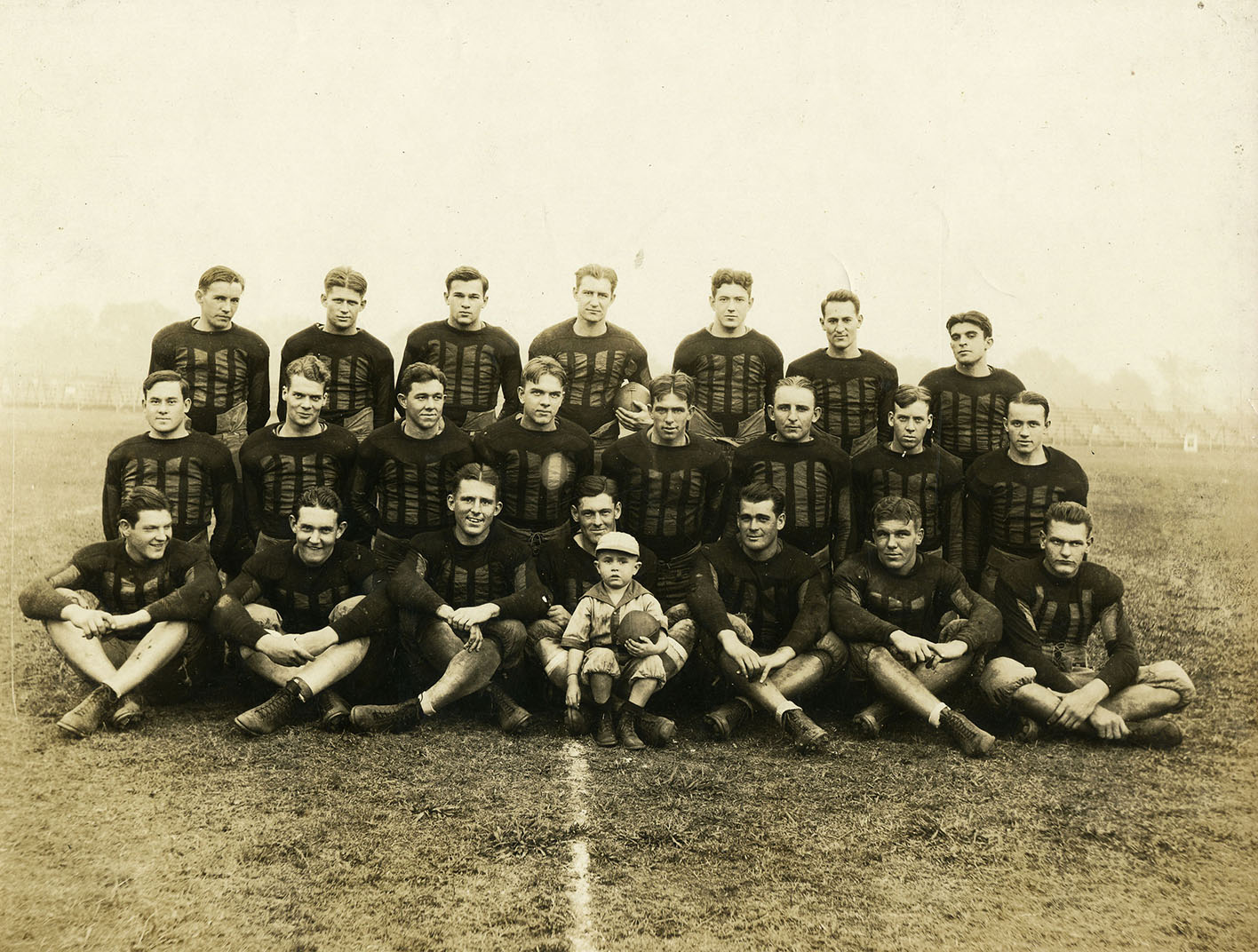

SoCon champion
- Conference: Southern Conference
- Record: 8–1 (5–0 SoCon)
- Head coach: Wallace Wade (2nd season)
- Offensive scheme: Single-wing
- Captain: Pooley Hubert
- Home stadium: Denny Field; Rickwood Field; Cramton Bowl

Uniform
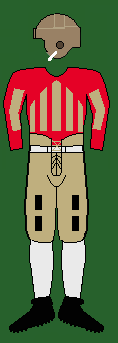

1924 Southern Conference football standings
	Conf.					Overall
Team	W		L		T	W		L		T
Alabama $	5	–	0	–	0	8	–	1	–	0
Florida	2	–	0	–	1	6	–	2	–	2
Georgia	5	–	1	–	0	7	–	3	–	0
Tulane	4	–	1	–	0	8	–	1	–	0
Washington and Lee	4	–	1	–	1	6	–	3	–	1
South Carolina	3	–	2	–	0	7	–	3	–	0
Sewanee *	3	–	2	–	0	6	–	4	–	0
Mississippi A&M	3	–	2	–	0	5	–	4	–	0
Virginia	3	–	2	–	0	5	–	4	–	0
Georgia Tech	3	–	2	–	1	5	–	3	–	1
Vanderbilt *	3	–	3	–	0	6	–	3	–	1
VPI	2	–	2	–	3	4	–	2	–	3
VMI	2	–	3	–	1	6	–	3	–	1
Kentucky	2	–	3	–	0	4	–	5	–	0
North Carolina	2	–	3	–	0	4	–	5	–	0
Auburn	2	–	4	–	1	4	–	4	–	1
Maryland	1	–	2	–	1	3	–	3	–	3
NC State	1	–	4	–	1	2	–	4	–	2
LSU	0	–	3	–	0	5	–	4	–	0
Ole Miss	0	–	3	–	0	4	–	5	–	0
Clemson	0	–	3	–	0	2	–	6	–	0
Tennessee	0	–	4	–	0	3	–	5	–	0
$ – Conference champion; * – co-member of SIAA

The 1924 Alabama Crimson Tide football team (variously "Alabama", "UA" or "Bama") represented the University of Alabama in the 1924 Southern Conference football season. It was the Crimson Tide's 31st overall and 3rd season as a member of the Southern Conference (SoCon). The team was led by head coach Wallace Wade, in his second year, and played their home games at Denny Field in Tuscaloosa, at Rickwood Field in Birmingham and at the Cramton Bowl in Montgomery, Alabama. They finished the season with a record of eight wins and one loss (8–1 overall, 5–0 in the SoCon), as Southern Conference champions and won the Champ Pickens Trophy.

Alabama opened the season with six consecutive shutout victories. After they defeated Union University at Tuscaloosa, the Crimson Tide defeated Furman in their first road contest of the season. Alabama returned to Tuscaloosa where they defeated Mississippi College a week prior to their victory over Sewanee at Birmingham in their SoCon opener. The Crimson Tide continued their dominance with victories at Georgia Tech and in Montgomery against Ole Miss before they allowed their first points of the season in their homecoming victory over Kentucky. Alabama then closed the season with a pair of games at Birmingham where they first lost their lone game against Centre and defeated Georgia in their final game and captured their first SoCon championship.

== Schedule ==
Date	Opponent	Site	Result	Attendance	Source
September 27	Union (TN)*	Denny Field; Tuscaloosa, AL	W 55–0		
October 4	at Furman*	Manly Field; Greenville, SC	W 20–0	3,000	
October 11	Mississippi College*	Denny Field; Tuscaloosa, AL	W 51–0		
October 18	Sewanee	Rickwood Field; Birmingham, AL	W 14–0	10,000	
October 25	at Georgia Tech	Grant Field; Atlanta, GA (rivalry)	W 14–0		
November 1	Ole Miss	Cramton Bowl; Montgomery, AL (rivalry)	W 61–0		
November 8	Kentucky^{†}	Denny Field; Tuscaloosa, AL	W 42–7		
November 15	Centre*	Rickwood Field; Birmingham, AL	L 0–17	10,000	
November 27	Georgia	Rickwood Field; Birmingham, AL (rivalry)	W 33–0	16,000	
*Non-conference game; ^{†}Homecoming

== Before the season ==
Coach Wade was assisted by Russ Cohen as end coach and Hank Crisp as line coach. The team was captained by Pooley Hubert. Georgia's then-athletic director Herman Stegeman remarked that with Hubert in the game Alabama had the advantage another team would have by a coach on the field of play. Coach Wade called Hubert "undoubtedly one of the greatest football players of all time."

== Game summaries ==
=== Union (TN) ===
Week 1: Union at Alabama

Team	1	2	3	4	Total
Union	0	0	0	0	0
• Alabama	21	21	0	13	55

- Date: September 27
- Location: Denny Field
  Tuscaloosa, Alabama

Alabama opened their 1924 season against Union University at Denny Field, and defeated the Bulldogs 55–0 In a game dominated by the Crimson Tide, touchdowns were scored by Johnny Mack Brown (3), David Rosenfeld (2), Pooley Hubert, Grant Gillis and Andy Cohen.

=== Furman ===
Week 2: Alabama at Furman

Team	1	2	3	4	Total
• Alabama	0	0	6	14	20
Furman	0	0	0	0	0

- Date: October 4
- Location: Manly Field
  Greenville, South Carolina
- Game attendance: 3,000
- Referee: Foster (Carolina)

In what was the first all-time meeting against Furman, Alabama shutout the Purple Hurricane by a 20–0 score in the first road game of the season. After a scoreless first half, Pooley Hubert scored on a one-yard touchdown run late in the third to give the Crimson Tide a 6–0 lead. Alabama then closed the game with a pair of fourth quarter touchdowns. The first came when Hubert ran through the entire Furman team on a fake punt, and the second on a 58-yard Johnny Mack Brown interception return.

The starting lineup was Bruce Jones (left end), Bill Buckler (left tackle), Ben Compton (left guard), Clyde Propst (center), W. S. Oliver (right guard), Jack Langhorne (right tackle), Graham McClintock (right end), Grant Gillis (quarterback), Red Barnes (left halfback), Johnny Mack Brown (right halfback), Pooley Hubert (fullback).

=== Mississippi College ===
Week 3: Mississippi College at Alabama

Team	1	2	3	4	Total
MS College	0	0	0	0	0
• Alabama	6	20	12	13	51

- Date: October 11
- Location: Denny Field
  Tuscaloosa, Alabama
- Referee: Moriarty (St. Mary's)

Against Mississippi College, the Crimson Tide defeated the Choctaws 51–0 at Tuscaloosa. In a game dominated by the Crimson Tide, touchdowns were scored by Pooley Hubert (3), Andy Cohen (2), David Rosenfeld (2), and Red Barnes. Rosenfeld had the longest play of the afternoon with his 82-yard touchdown run.

The starting lineup was Ben Hudson (left end), Bill Buckler (left tackle), Bruce Jones (left guard), Clyde Propst (center), Ben Compton (right guard), Jack Langhorne (right tackle), Graham McClintock (right end), Grant Gillis (quarterback), Red Barnes (left halfback), Johnny Mack Brown (right halfback), Pooley Hubert (fullback).

=== Sewanee ===
Week 4: Sewanee at Alabama

Team	1	2	3	4	Total
Sewanee	0	0	0	0	0
• Alabama	7	7	0	0	14

- Date: October 28
- Location: Rickwood Field
  Birmingham, Alabama
- Game attendance: 10,000
- Referee: Kittleman (Northwestern)

In what was their first game in conference play, Alabama defeated the Sewanee Tigers 14–0 at Rickwood Field. David Rosenfeld gave the Crimson Tide a 7–0 lead after his 56-yard run in the first quarter. Pooley Hubert then scored what would be the final points of the game on a four-yard touchdown run that made the final score 14–0.

Of note in the second quarter, the Sewanee team got into a fight with the Alabama student section in the second quarter.

The starting lineup was Red Barnes (left end), Bill Buckler (left tackle), Ben Compton (left guard), Clyde Propst (center), Bruce Jones (right guard), Jack Langhorne (right tackle), Graham McClintock (right end), Grant Gillis (quarterback), David Rosenfeld (left halfback), Hulet Whitaker (right halfback), Pooley Hubert (fullback).

=== Georgia Tech ===
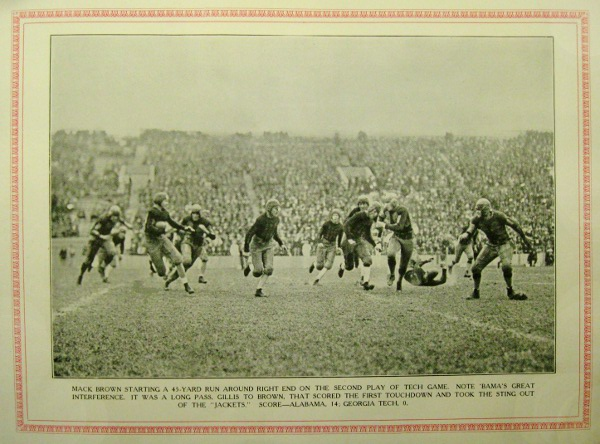
Brown on an end run against Tech.

Week 5: Alabama at Georgia Tech

Team	1	2	3	4	Total
• Alabama	0	7	0	7	14
GA Tech	0	0	0	0	0

- Date: October 25
- Location: Grant Field
  Atlanta, Georgia

At Atlanta, Alabama defeated the Georgia Tech Golden Tornado for the first time since their 1914 season with a 14–0 victory. After a scoreless first quarter, the Crimson Tide took a 7–0 lead on a double pass from Grant Gillis to Johnny Mack Brown. Tech drove the ball to the Alabama six yard line in the third with a chance to tie the game up but was stopped on 4th and 1.

A short David Rosenfeld touchdown run in the fourth quarter clinched the Alabama victory.

The starting lineup was Herschel Caldwell (left end), Bill Buckler (left tackle), Jack Langhorne (left guard), Clyde Propst (center), Bruce Jones (right guard), Pete Camp (right tackle), Graham McClintock (right end), Grant Gillis (quarterback), Hulet Whitaker (left halfback), Johnny Mack Brown (right halfback), Pooley Hubert (fullback).

=== Ole Miss ===
Week 6: Ole Miss at Alabama

Team	1	2	3	4	Total
Ole Miss	0	0	0	0	0
• Alabama	7	7	13	34	61

- Date: November 1
- Location: Cramton Bowl
  Montgomery, Alabama
- Referee: Coles (Clemson)

At Montgomery Alabama defeated the Ole Miss Rebels 61–0 at the Cramton Bowl. The Crimson Tide scored nine touchdowns and had 26 first downs to Ole Miss's one in the contest. Touchdowns were scored by James Johnson (3), Johnny Mack Brown (2), David Rosenfeld, Red Barnes, Herschel Caldwell and Andy Cohen.

The starting lineup was Herschel Caldwell (left end), Claude Perry (left tackle), Bruce Jones (left guard), Clyde Propst (center), Ben Compton (right guard), Pete Camp (right tackle), Graham McClintock (right end), Grant Gillis (quarterback), Hulet Whitaker (left halfback), Johnny Mack Brown (right halfback), Pooley Hubert (fullback).

=== Kentucky ===
Week 7: Kentucky at Alabama

Team	1	2	3	4	Total
Kentucky	0	0	7	0	7
• Alabama	7	7	14	14	42

- Date: November 8
- Location: Denny Field
  Tuscaloosa, Alabama
- Referee: Kittleman (Northwestern)

For the second consecutive year Alabama played Kentucky for homecoming, and for the second consecutive year the Crimson Tide defeated the Wildcats, this time by a score of 42–7. Alabama took a 7–0 lead in the first quarter on a short Pooley Hubert touchdown run, and then they extended to 14–0 at halftime behind a Herschel Caldwell touchdown reception from Grant Gillis in the second. Early in the third quarter, Charles Hughes scored Kentucky's lone points with his 97-yard interception return for a touchdown. This also marked the first points scored against the Crimson Tide for the season as they had shut out their previous six opponents.

Johnny Mack Brown scored on the next play when he returned the kickoff 101 yards for a touchdown and extended the Alabama lead to 21–7. Hubert then scored the next pair of touchdowns for the Crimson Tide on runs in the third and fourth quarters. David Rosenfeld then made the final score 42–7 with his 76-yard punt return late in the fourth quarter.

The starting lineup was Herschel Caldwell (left end), Bill Buckner (left tackle), Jack Langhorne (left guard), Clyde Propst (center), Bruce Jones (right guard), Pete Camp (right tackle), Graham McClintock (right end), Grant Gillis (quarterback), Johnny Mack Brown (left halfback), Hulet Whitaker (right halfback), Pooley Hubert (fullback).

=== Centre ===
Week 8: Centre at Alabama

Team	1	2	3	4	Total
• Centre	0	7	3	7	17
Alabama	0	0	0	0	0

- Date: November 15
- Location: Rickwood Field
  Birmingham, Alabama
- Game attendance: 10,000
- Referee: Kittleman (Northwestern)

Against Centre College, Alabama lost their only game of the season to the Praying Colonels at Rickwood Field by a 17–0 score. After a scoreless first quarter, Centre took a 7–0 lead into halftime after Herb Covington scored on a short run. Cliff Lemon then extended their lead with his 32-yard field goal in the third quarter, and then made the final score 17–0 with his 20-yard touchdown reception from Covington in the fourth quarter.

Alabama would not lose another game until their loss against Georgia Tech in their 1927 season.

The starting lineup was Herschel Caldwell (left end), Jack Langhorne (left tackle), Bill Buckler (left guard), Clyde Propst (center), Bruce Jones (right guard), Tom Camp (right tackle), Graham McClintock (right end), Grant Gillis (quarterback), David Rosenfeld (left halfback), Hulet Whitaker (right halfback), Pooley Hubert (fullback).

=== Georgia ===
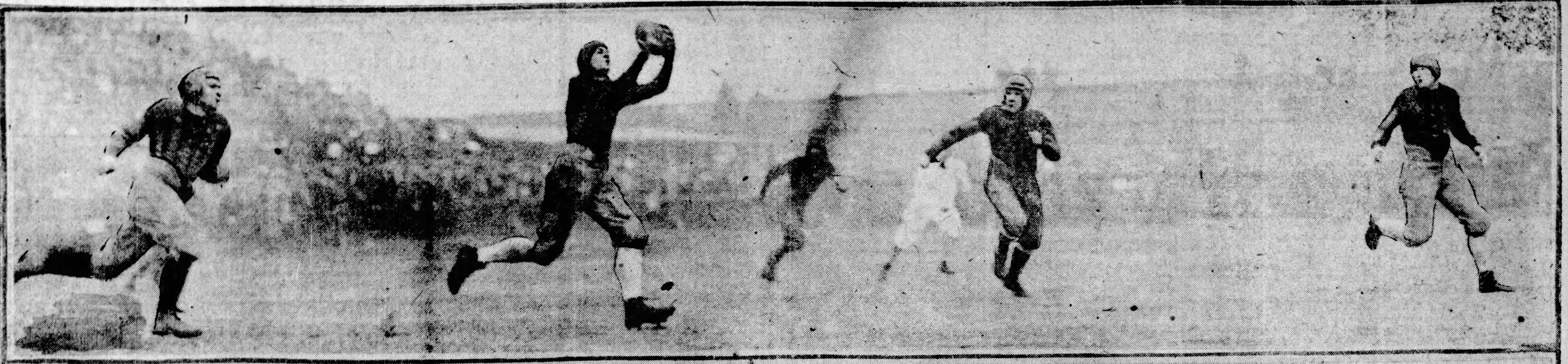
Herschel Caldwell receiving the pass from Pooley Hubert he would run for a touchdown in the second quarter.

Week 9: Georgia at Alabama

Team	1	2	3	4	Total
Georgia	0	0	0	0	0
• Alabama	6	6	0	21	33

- Date: November 27
- Location: Rickwood Field
  Birmingham, Alabama
- Game attendance: 16,000

In their final game of the season the Crimson Tide defeated the Georgia Bulldogs 33–0, and secured their first SoCon football championship. Alabama took a 6–0 lead in the first quarter behind field goals of 33 and 35 yards by Ben Compton. The lead was extended to 12–0 at halftime after Pooley Hubert threw a 15-yard touchdown pass to Herschel Caldwell in the second quarter.

After a scoreless third, Alabama closed the game with a trio of fourth quarter touchdowns. The first came on a Hubert pass to Ben Hudson, the second on a 65-yard Johnny Mack Brown interception return, and the third on a Hubert run.

The starting lineup was Bem Hudson (left end), Ben Compton (left tackle), W. S. Oliver (left guard), Clyde Propst (center), Jack Langhorne (right guard), Pete Camp (right tackle), Graham McClintock (right end), Pooley Hubert (quarterback), Johnny Mack Brown (left halfback), Red Barnes (right halfback), Herschel Caldwell (fullback).

== Postseason ==
The Tide started with season with seven consecutive victories, and was only really challenged once. Alabama was awarded the Champ Pickens Trophy. "This was the beginning of the Crimson reign." "Wade...had developed football players who tackled more smartly than any football players had hitherto tackled in the South and in blocking they were in a class by themselves."

== Personnel ==
=== Varsity letter winners ===
==== Line ====
Number	Player	Hometown	Position	Games started	Prep school	Height	Weight	Age
	Bill Buckler	Saint Paul, Minnesota	Guard					
	Joseph "Pete" Camp	Manchester, Alabama	Tackle					
	Ben E. Compton	Greensboro, Alabama	Guard					
	Ernest Cooper	St. Stephens, Alabama	Tackle					
	Gordon Holmes	Springville, Alabama	Center					
	Ben A. Hudson	Montgomery, Alabama	End					
	Bruce Jones	Jasper, Alabama	Guard					
	Jack Langhorne	Uniontown, Alabama	Tackle					
	Graham McClintock	Laurel, Mississippi	End/Back					
	Clyde "Shorty" Propst	Ohatchee, Alabama	Center					
58	Hoyt "Wu" Winslett	Dadeville, Alabama	End				172	20

==== Backfield ====
Number	Player	Hometown	Position	Games started	Prep school	Height	Weight	Age
17	Johnny Mack Brown	Dothan, Alabama	Halfback		Dothan High	5'11"	160	20
	Andy Cohen	El Paso, Texas	Back			5'8"	155	20
	Grant Gillis	Grove Hill, Alabama	Quarterback			5'10	165	23
10	Allison "Pooley" Hubert	Meridian, Mississippi	Fullback		Meridian High	5'10"	190	23
	James Johnson	Tuscaloosa, Alabama	Halfback					

=== Coaching staff ===
Name	Position	Seasons at Alabama	Alma mater
Wallace Wade	Head coach	2	Brown (1917)
Hank Crisp	Assistant coach	4	VPI (1920)
Russell Cohen	Assistant coach	2	Vanderbilt (1916)
William T. Van de Graaff	Assistant coach	4	Alabama (1916)
