= 1924 Florida Gators football team =

American college football season

1924 Florida Gators football
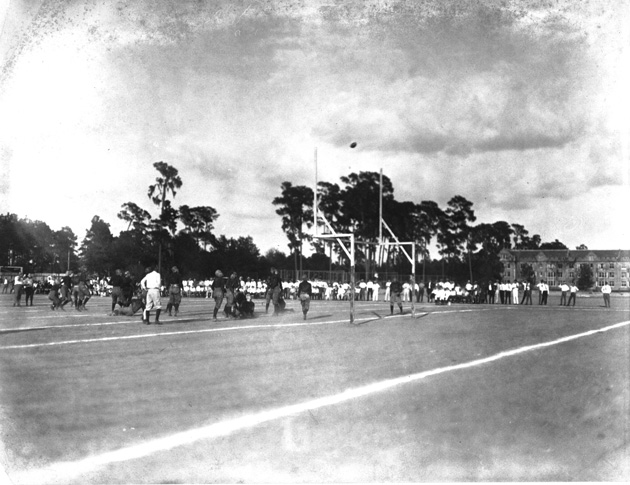
- A field goal on Fleming Field
- Conference: Southern Conference
- Record: 6–2–2 (2–0–1 SoCon)
- Head coach: James Van Fleet (2nd season)
- Offensive scheme: Notre Dame Box
- Captain: Ark Newton
- Home stadium: Fleming Field

Uniform
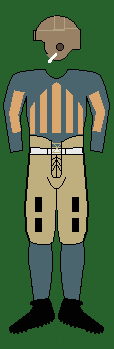

1924 Southern Conference football standings
	Conf.					Overall
Team	W		L		T	W		L		T
Alabama $	5	–	0	–	0	8	–	1	–	0
Florida	2	–	0	–	1	6	–	2	–	2
Georgia	5	–	1	–	0	7	–	3	–	0
Tulane	4	–	1	–	0	8	–	1	–	0
Washington and Lee	4	–	1	–	1	6	–	3	–	1
South Carolina	3	–	2	–	0	7	–	3	–	0
Sewanee *	3	–	2	–	0	6	–	4	–	0
Mississippi A&M	3	–	2	–	0	5	–	4	–	0
Virginia	3	–	2	–	0	5	–	4	–	0
Georgia Tech	3	–	2	–	1	5	–	3	–	1
Vanderbilt *	3	–	3	–	0	6	–	3	–	1
VPI	2	–	2	–	3	4	–	2	–	3
VMI	2	–	3	–	1	6	–	3	–	1
Kentucky	2	–	3	–	0	4	–	5	–	0
North Carolina	2	–	3	–	0	4	–	5	–	0
Auburn	2	–	4	–	1	4	–	4	–	1
Maryland	1	–	2	–	1	3	–	3	–	3
NC State	1	–	4	–	1	2	–	4	–	2
LSU	0	–	3	–	0	5	–	4	–	0
Ole Miss	0	–	3	–	0	4	–	5	–	0
Clemson	0	–	3	–	0	2	–	6	–	0
Tennessee	0	–	4	–	0	3	–	5	–	0
$ – Conference champion; * – co-member of SIAA

The 1924 Florida Gators football team represented the University of Florida during the 1924 Southern Conference football season. This was Major James Van Fleet's second and final year as the head coach of the Florida Gators football team. Van Fleet's 1924 Florida Gators finished 6–2–2 overall, and 2–0–1 in the Southern Conference, placing second of twenty-two teams in the conference standings.

The Gators traveled further during the 1924 season than any other college football team in the country, and received national recognition for a controversial tie with the Texas Longhorns and the close loss to Army. The season also involves a tie with southern power Georgia Tech.

== Before the season ==
Coach Van Fleet's assignment was changed to the Panama Canal Zone, but he coached the team on an unpaid basis during four months of leave. More than 100 players took part in the game between the varsity and freshmen.

A 4-month old Florida black bear captured by a freshman wandered onto the field on October 1. Some fan placed a Gator banner on its back, and it never caused much trouble.

== Schedule ==
Date	Opponent	Site	Result	Attendance	Source
October 4	Rollins*	Fleming Field; Gainesville, FL	W 77–0		
October 11	at Georgia Tech	Grant Field; Atlanta, GA	T 7–7	20,000	
October 18	vs. Wake Forest*	Plant Field; Tampa, FL	W 34–0		
October 25	at Texas*	Clark Field; Austin, TX	T 7–7		
November 1	Southern College*	Fleming Field; Gainesville, FL	W 27–0		
November 8	at Army*	Michie Stadium; West Point, NY	L 7–14		
November 14	at Mercer*	Alumni Field; Macon, GA	L 0–10	6,000	
November 22	vs. Mississippi A&M	Cramton Bowl; Montgomery, AL	W 27–0		
November 27	Drake*^{†}	Fleming Field; Gainesville, FL	W 10–0		
December 6	vs. Washington & Lee	Barrs Field; Jacksonville, FL	W 16–6	8,000	
*Non-conference game; ^{†}Homecoming

== Game summaries ==
=== Week 1: Rollins ===
Week 1: Rollins at Florida

Team	1	2	3	4	Total
Rollins	0	0	0	0	0
• Florida	6	21	28	22	77

- Date: October 4
- Location: Fleming Field
  Gainesville, FL
- Game weather: Rain
- Referee: Arthur R. Hutchins

At the "newly completed" Fleming Field in Gainesville the Gators rolled up a 77–0 score on the Rollins Tars. The game was played mostly in the rain. Every man on the Gator squad saw playing time. Owen Pittman scored three touchdowns; Tiny Chaplin, Ark Newton, Spic Stanley, and Bob Brumby scored two each, and Dick Brown scored one. Chaplin contributed a field goal. Newton had five extra points; Brown two, and Brumby one.

The starting lineup for the Gators against Rollins: Todd (left end), Williams (left tackle), Norton (left guard), Cornwall (center), Goldstein (right guard), Davis (right tackle), Oosterhoudt (right end), Murphree (quarterback), Newton (left halfback), Brown (right halfback), Chaplin (fullback).

=== Week 2: at Georgia Tech ===
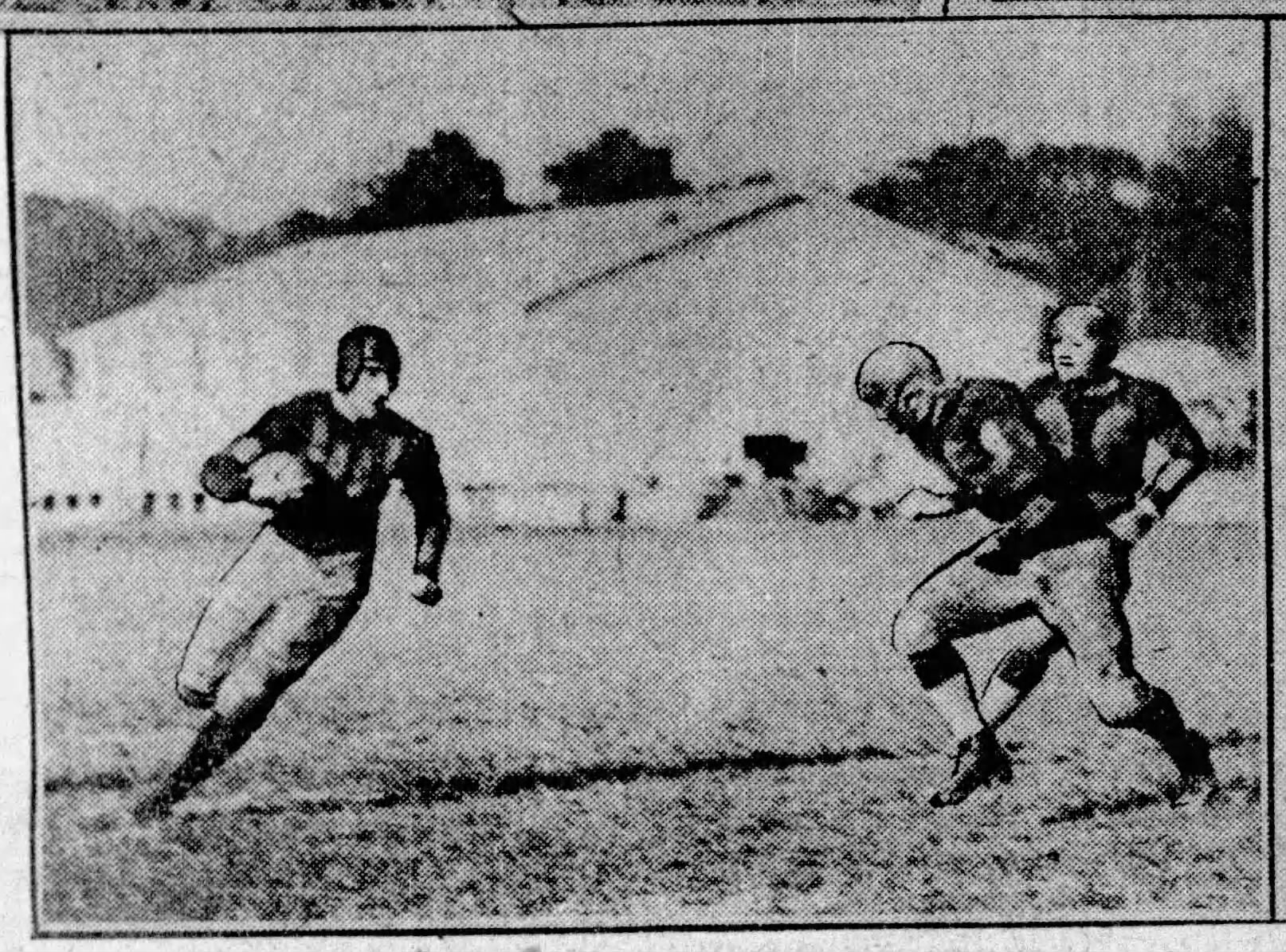
Ark Newton with football about to be tackled by Ivan Williams of Georgia Tech

Week 2: Florida at Georgia Tech

Team	1	2	3	4	Total
Florida	0	7	0	0	7
Ga. Tech	7	0	0	0	7

- Date: October 11
- Location: Grant Field
  Atlanta, GA
- Referee: W. R. Tichenor

The Gators and Bill Alexander's Georgia Tech Golden Tornado fought to a 7–7 tie, the second tie with Tech in two years.

Within the first few minutes, Tech scored when Gus Merkle launched at Edgar C. Jones, causing him to crash into the approaching Cy Williams and fumble. Doug Wycoff picked it up and ran 35 yards for the score. Florida once fumbled at Tech's 1-yard line. Again the Gators drove to the goal, and a Jones to Ark Newton pass tied the game.

The starting lineup for the Gators against Georgia Tech: Lightsey (left end), Williams (left tackle), Norton (left guard), Cornwall (center), Goldstein (right guard), Smith (right tackle), Oosterhoudt (right end), Jones (quarterback), Newton (left halfback), Brown (right halfback), Middlekauff (fullback).

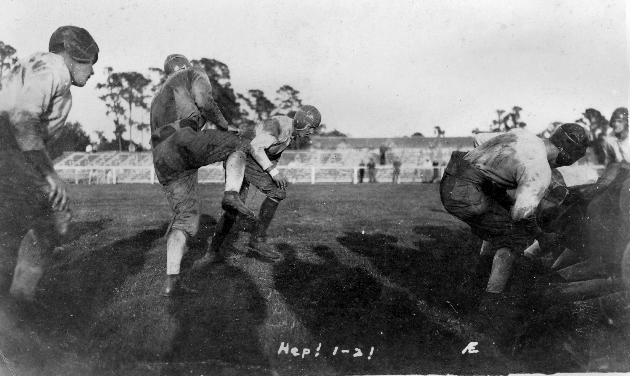
Florida football c. 1924

=== Week 3: Wake Forest ===
Week 3: Wake Forest at Florida

Team	1	2	3	4	Total
Wake	0	0	0	0	0
• Florida	7	7	13	7	34

- Date: October 18
- Location: Plant Field
  Tampa, FL
- Game attendance: 11,000
- Game weather: Rain
- Referee: Arthur R. Hutchins

On Plant Field in a drizzling rain, Florida defeated the Wake Forest Demon Deacons 34–0, a surprising score. Fullback Tiny Chaplin was the star of the day; as well as the forward passes of captain Ark Newton, Edgar C. Jones on punt returns, and Cy Williams in the line. Bill Middlekauff was kept out of the lineup due to injures sustained versus Tech.

The starting lineup for the Gators against Wake: Lightsey (left end), Williams (left tackle), Norton (left guard), Cornwall (center), Goldstein (right guard), Smith (right tackle), Merrin (right end), Jones (quarterback), Newton (left halfback), Brown (right halfback), Chaplin (fullback).

=== Week 4: at Texas ===
Week 4: Florida at Texas

Team	1	2	3	4	Total
Florida	7	0	0	0	7
Texas	0	7	0	0	7

- Date: October 25
- Location: Clark Field
  Austin, TX

Both Florida and the Texas Longhorns faced one of their season's stiffest tests when the Gators traveled to Austin. The game ended a 7–7 draw, and was a controversial one.

Van Fleet explained that Texas coach Doc Stewart did not like Florida's former coach William G. Kline, and thus accused Florida of harboring a pro team, demanding verification of ages and accusing Ark Newton of being a professional. Florida scored on an illegal play which went unnoticed, a pass from Edgar Jones to Spec Lightsey, who had lined up at tackle. Texas scored on the last of the first half, after the clock had run out already and officials ruled to give Texas another play.

=== Week 5: Southern College ===
Upon return from the Texas game, the Gators got some time off practice to attend the circus in town. Mostly reserves defeated Southern College 27–0.

The starting lineup for the Gators against Southern: Lightsey (left end), Williams (left tackle), Peter (left guard), Cornwall (center), Goldstein (right guard), Davis (right tackle), Merrin (right end), Murphee (quarterback), Pittman (left halfback), Brown (right halfback), Chaplin (fullback).

=== Week 6: at Army ===
Week 6: Florida at Army

Team	1	2	3	4	Total
Florida	0	0	7	0	7
• Army	7	0	0	7	14

- Date: November 8
- Location: Michie Stadium
  West Point, NY

The Gators traveled to West Point to play coach John McEwan's Army Cadets and lost 14 to 7. The close loss was felt bitterly. The Gators were expected to lose 16 to 0.

Army's Harry Wilson scored the first touchdown. Ark Newton ran the second half kickoff for a 102-yard touchdown. A second third quarter Gator touchdown was waved off, and Army scored in the final moments to evade the tie.

Coach Van Fleet kvetched about the officiating favoring his alma mater: "I hate to say it but they robbed us. Twice we scored, our backs pushing across the goal line, but the officials would not blow the whistle until our boys were pushed back...Then, later in the game on an important play, Bill Middlekauff was clipped right in front of our bench, and they did not call it. He was clipped so severely it broke his left leg. It was a disgrace." Of Newton's kick return, Van Fleet said thereby Newton "carved his name in the football hall of fame."

The starting lineup was: Lightsey (left end), Williams (left tackle), Norton (left guard), Cornwall (center), Goldstein (right guard), Smith (right tackle), Oosterhoudt (right end), Jones (quarterback), Brown (left halfback), Pittman (right halfback), Middlekauf (fullback).

=== Week 7: at Mercer ===
Week 7: Florida at Mercer

Team	1	2	3	4	Total
Florida	0	0	0	0	0
• Mercer	7	0	0	3	10

- Date: November 15
- Location: Macon, GA
- Game attendance: 6,000

The Gators returned south, and after much travel (over 5,000 miles in three weeks), coach Stanley L. Robinson's Mercer Bears defeated Florida 10 to 0. Mercer's Crook Smith starred. The touchdown came on a dextrous twist, catch, and run by Kid Cecil.

The game caused Morgan Blake, sportswriter for the Atlanta Journal, to remark "the Mercer Alumni would do well to name their children after "Crook" Smith and Sid Ellison."

=== Week 8: vs. Mississippi A&M ===
Week 8: Mississippi A&M vs. Florida

Team	1	2	3	4	Total
Miss. A&M	0	0	0	0	0
• Florida	0	6	0	21	27

- Date: November 22
- Location: Cramton Bowl
  Montgomery, AL

Bitter after the untimely loss to Mercer and last year's tie with Mississippi A&M, the Gators unleashed their second win in the state of Alabama when they defeated coach Earl Abell's Mississippi Aggies 27–0 in Montgomery.

After a scoreless first quarter, Dick Brown and Spic Stanley led the Gator attack from the backfield.

The starting lineup was: Lightsey (left end), Williams (left tackle), Norton (left guard), Cornwall (center), Goldstein (right guard), Smith (right tackle), Merrin (right end), Jones (quarterback), Newton (left halfback), Brown (right halfback), Chaplin (fullback).

=== Week 9: Drake ===
Week 9: Drake at Florida

Team	1	2	3	4	Total
Drake	0	0	0	0	0
• Florida	0	0	10	0	10

- Date: November 27
- Location: Fleming Field
  Gainesville, FL
- Referee: Ted Arnold

At homecoming, Florida's ability to break up passes and hot weather helped the Gators to a 10–0 intersectional victory over the Drake Bulldogs. Florida's Dick Brown was the game's standout performer. Florida had eight first downs and Drake seven.

Scores came on a 30-yard interception return for a touchdown by Brown and a 25-yard Ark Newton field goal from placement.

Photo of Drake-Florida game.

The starting lineup for the Gators against Drake: Oosterhoudt (left end), Williams (left tackle), Norton (left guard), Sarra (center), Goldstein (right guard), Stewart (right tackle), Merrin (right end), Jones (quarterback), Newton (left halfback), Brown (right halfback), Chaplin (fullback).

=== Week 10: Washington & Lee ===
Week 10: Washington & Lee at Florida

Team	1	2	3	4	Total
W&L	0	6	0	0	6
• Florida	3	7	0	6	16

- Date: December 8
- Location: Jacksonville, FL
- Referee: Rip Major

The Gators defeated coach James DeHart's South Atlantic champion Washington & Lee Generals 16–6 in Jacksonville. Jacksonville natives Edgar C. Jones and Dick Brown ran well; and Ark Newton punted 13 times for an average of 55 yards. Florida made numerous substitutions in the fourth quarter. Neither team had before suffered a conference loss, and the win secured Florida a second-place finish.

The starting lineup for the Gators against Washington & Lee: Rose (left end), Williams (left tackle), Norton (left guard), Sarra (center), Goldstein (right guard), Smith (right tackle), Merrin (right end), Jones (quarterback), Brown (left halfback), Newton (right halfback), Chaplin (fullback).

== Postseason ==
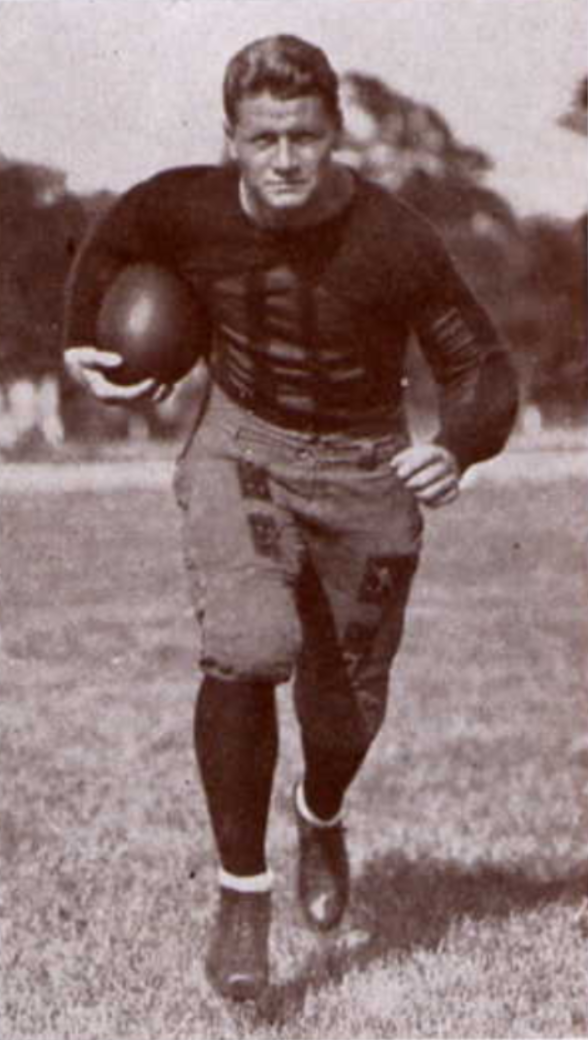
Edgar C. Jones

=== Awards and honors ===
Goldy Goldstein and Edgar C. Jones made composite All-Southern.

=== Van Fleet's departure ===
The U.S. Army transferred Van Fleet to the Panama Canal Zone after the 1924 season, and he would later become a regimental, divisional and corps commander during World War II and the commander of all United States and United Nations armed forces during the Korean War.

== Personnel ==
=== Depth chart ===
The following chart provides a visual depiction of Florida's lineup during the 1924 season with games started at the position reflected in parentheses. The chart mimics a Notre Dame Box on offense.

LE
Spec Lightsey (5)
Frank Oosterhoudt (1)
J. R. Rose (1)
Edgar Todd (1)

LT	LG	C	RG	RT
Cy Williams (8)	Clyde Norton (7)	Sam Cornwall (6)	Goldy Goldstein (8)	Horse Smith (5)
	Peter (1)	Lamar Sarra (2)		Clyde Davis (2)
				Jack Stewart (1)

RE
Joe Merrin (5)
Frank Oosterhoudt (3)

QB
Edgar C. Jones (6)
Johnnie Murphree (2)

RHB
Dick Brown (5)
Ark Newton (1)
Owen Pittman (1)

LHB
Ark Newton (5)
Dick Brown (2)
Owen Pittman (1)

FB
Tiny Chaplin (6)
Bill Middlekauff (2)

=== Line ===
==== Starters ====
Player	Position	Games started	Hometown	Prep school	Height	Weight	Age
Sam Cornwall	center						
Goldy Goldstein	guard		Jacksonville, Florida	Duval High	6'3"	210	19
Spec Lightsey	end						
Joe Merrin	end						
Clyde Norton	guard						
Frank Oosterhoudt	end						
J. R. Rose	end						
Lamar Sarra	center						
Horse Smith	tackle						
Jack Stewart	guard						
Cy Williams	tackle		Sopchoppy, Florida		6'0"	200	

==== Subs ====
Player	Position	Hometown	Prep school	Height	Weight	Age
W. F. "Stonebruise" Anderson	guard					
Ralph Champlain	tackle					
Clyde Davis	tackle					
Cadillac Harry	tackle					
Carl Price	guard					
Ezra Raasch	tackle					
Edgar Todd	end					
Wilson	end					

=== Backfield ===
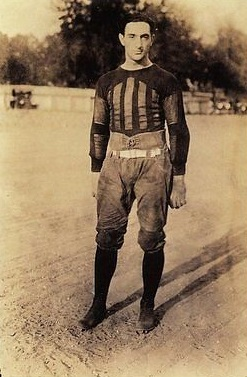
Captain Newton.

==== Starters ====
Player	Position	Games started	Hometown	Prep school	Height	Weight	Age
Dick Brown	halfback						
Tiny Chaplin	fullback						
Edgar C. Jones	quarterback		Jacksonville, Florida				
Bill Middlekauff	fullback		Miami, Florida		6'2"	200	
Johnnie Murphree	quarterback						
Ark Newton	halfback		Camden, Arkansas	Camden High	6'1"	185	21

==== Subs ====
Player	Position	Hometown	Prep school	Height	Weight	Age
Bob Brumby	quarterback					
George Merrin	halfback					
Owen Pittman	halfback					
Spic Stanley	halfback					

=== Coaching staff ===
- Head coach: James Van Fleet
- Assistants: Tom Sebring, A. C. Tipton, Everett Yon, J. H. Atkinson, Herbert Bunker, Brady Cowell (freshmen)
- Manager: John Bond

== See also ==
- 1924 College Football All-Southern Team
