= 1924 Tennessee Volunteers football team =

American college football season

1924 Tennessee Volunteers football
- Conference: Southern Conference
- Record: 3–5 (0–4 SoCon)
- Head coach: M. B. Banks (4th season)
- Captain: J. G. Lowe
- Home stadium: Shields–Watkins Field

Uniform
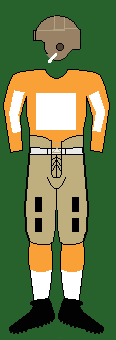

1924 Southern Conference football standings
	Conf.					Overall
Team	W		L		T	W		L		T
Alabama $	5	–	0	–	0	8	–	1	–	0
Florida	2	–	0	–	1	6	–	2	–	2
Georgia	5	–	1	–	0	7	–	3	–	0
Tulane	4	–	1	–	0	8	–	1	–	0
Washington and Lee	4	–	1	–	1	6	–	3	–	1
South Carolina	3	–	2	–	0	7	–	3	–	0
Sewanee *	3	–	2	–	0	6	–	4	–	0
Mississippi A&M	3	–	2	–	0	5	–	4	–	0
Virginia	3	–	2	–	0	5	–	4	–	0
Georgia Tech	3	–	2	–	1	5	–	3	–	1
Vanderbilt *	3	–	3	–	0	6	–	3	–	1
VPI	2	–	2	–	3	4	–	2	–	3
VMI	2	–	3	–	1	6	–	3	–	1
Kentucky	2	–	3	–	0	4	–	5	–	0
North Carolina	2	–	3	–	0	4	–	5	–	0
Auburn	2	–	4	–	1	4	–	4	–	1
Maryland	1	–	2	–	1	3	–	3	–	3
NC State	1	–	4	–	1	2	–	4	–	2
LSU	0	–	3	–	0	5	–	4	–	0
Ole Miss	0	–	3	–	0	4	–	5	–	0
Clemson	0	–	3	–	0	2	–	6	–	0
Tennessee	0	–	4	–	0	3	–	5	–	0
$ – Conference champion; * – co-member of SIAA

The 1924 Tennessee Volunteers football team (variously "Tennessee", "UT" or the "Vols") represented the University of Tennessee in the 1924 college football season. Playing as a member of the Southern Conference (SoCon), the team was led by head coach M. B. Banks, in his fourth year, and played their home games at Shields–Watkins Field in Knoxville, Tennessee. The 1924 Vols won three and lost five games (3–5 overall, 0–4 in the SoCon). Tennessee was outscored by their opponents 135 to 83 and shutout twice.

== Schedule ==
Date	Opponent	Site	Result	Attendance	Source
October 4	Emory and Henry*	Shields–Watkins Field; Knoxville, TN	W 27–0		
October 11	Maryville (TN)*	Shields–Watkins Field; Knoxville, TN	W 28–10		
October 18	Carson–Newman*	Shields–Watkins Field; Knoxville, TN	W 13–0		
October 25	vs. Mississippi A&M	Russwood Park; Memphis, TN	L 2–7	5,800	
November 1	at Georgia	Sanford Field; Athens, GA (rivalry)	L 0–33		
November 8	Centre*	Shields–Watkins Field; Knoxville, TN	L 0–32		
November 15	at Tulane	Tulane Stadium; New Orleans, LA	L 7–26		
November 27	Kentucky	Shields–Watkins Field; Knoxville, TN (rivalry)	L 6–27		
*Non-conference game

== Players ==
1924 Tennessee Volunteers roster
Quarterbacks: 27 Billy Harkness; Halfbacks: 7 William Bone; 10 George Flowers	Fullbacks: 12 Roe Campbell; Ends: 2 Jack Batey; 3 Fred Brown	Tackles: 13 J. G. Lowe; 1 George Burdette; Guards: 16 Tom Robinson; 6 Bulman	Centers: 26 V. Vowell; Unlisted: 9 Robert Bond; 3 Fred Brown; 5 Rollin Wilson; 23 E. K. Christmas; 15 Harry King; 18 Lawrence; 20 Robert Lavin; 25 Gregory; 29 Everett Deaver; 21 Jones; 28 Jones
