= 1924 Virginia Cavaliers football team =

American college football season

1924 Virginia Cavaliers football
- Conference: Southern Conference
- Record: 5–4 (3–2 SoCon)
- Head coach: Greasy Neale (2nd season)
- Home stadium: Lambeth Field

1924 Southern Conference football standings
	Conf.					Overall
Team	W		L		T	W		L		T
Alabama $	5	–	0	–	0	8	–	1	–	0
Florida	2	–	0	–	1	6	–	2	–	2
Georgia	5	–	1	–	0	7	–	3	–	0
Tulane	4	–	1	–	0	8	–	1	–	0
Washington and Lee	4	–	1	–	1	6	–	3	–	1
South Carolina	3	–	2	–	0	7	–	3	–	0
Sewanee *	3	–	2	–	0	6	–	4	–	0
Mississippi A&M	3	–	2	–	0	5	–	4	–	0
Virginia	3	–	2	–	0	5	–	4	–	0
Georgia Tech	3	–	2	–	1	5	–	3	–	1
Vanderbilt *	3	–	3	–	0	6	–	3	–	1
VPI	2	–	2	–	3	4	–	2	–	3
VMI	2	–	3	–	1	6	–	3	–	1
Kentucky	2	–	3	–	0	4	–	5	–	0
North Carolina	2	–	3	–	0	4	–	5	–	0
Auburn	2	–	4	–	1	4	–	4	–	1
Maryland	1	–	2	–	1	3	–	3	–	3
NC State	1	–	4	–	1	2	–	4	–	2
LSU	0	–	3	–	0	5	–	4	–	0
Ole Miss	0	–	3	–	0	4	–	5	–	0
Clemson	0	–	3	–	0	2	–	6	–	0
Tennessee	0	–	4	–	0	3	–	5	–	0
$ – Conference champion; * – co-member of SIAA

The 1924 Virginia Cavaliers football team represented the University of Virginia as a member of the Southern Conference (SoCon) during the 1924 college football season. Led by second-year head coach Greasy Neale, the Cavaliers compiled an overall record of 5–4 with a mark of 3–2 in conference play, tying for sixth place in the SoCon. The team played its games at Lambeth Field in Charlottesville, Virginia.

== Schedule ==
Date	Opponent	Site	Result	Attendance	Source
September 27	Hampden–Sydney*	Lambeth Field; Charlottesville, VA	W 13–9		
October 4	Harvard*	Harvard Stadium; Boston, MA	L 0–14		
October 11	Randolph–Macon*	Lambeth Field; Charlottesville, VA	W 26–6		
October 18	at VMI	Alumni Field; Lexington, VA	W 13–0		
October 25	at Penn*	Franklin Field; Philadelphia, PA	L 0–27	30,000	
November 1	Washington and Lee	Lambeth Field; Charlottesville, VA	L 7–20		
November 8	Georgia^{†}	Lambeth Field; Charlottesville, VA	L 0–7		
November 15	VPI	Miles Field; Blacksburg, VA (rivalry)	W 6–0		
November 27	North Carolina	Lambeth Field; Charlottesville, VA (rivalry)	W 7–0		
*Non-conference game; ^{†}Homecoming
