= 1924 LSU Tigers football team =

American college football season

1924 LSU Tigers football
- Conference: Southern Conference
- Record: 5–4 (0–3 SoCon)
- Head coach: Mike Donahue (2nd season)
- Captain: Cliff Campbell
- Home stadium: State Field; Tiger Stadium

1924 Southern Conference football standings
	Conf.					Overall
Team	W		L		T	W		L		T
Alabama $	5	–	0	–	0	8	–	1	–	0
Florida	2	–	0	–	1	6	–	2	–	2
Georgia	5	–	1	–	0	7	–	3	–	0
Tulane	4	–	1	–	0	8	–	1	–	0
Washington and Lee	4	–	1	–	1	6	–	3	–	1
South Carolina	3	–	2	–	0	7	–	3	–	0
Sewanee *	3	–	2	–	0	6	–	4	–	0
Mississippi A&M	3	–	2	–	0	5	–	4	–	0
Virginia	3	–	2	–	0	5	–	4	–	0
Georgia Tech	3	–	2	–	1	5	–	3	–	1
Vanderbilt *	3	–	3	–	0	6	–	3	–	1
VPI	2	–	2	–	3	4	–	2	–	3
VMI	2	–	3	–	1	6	–	3	–	1
Kentucky	2	–	3	–	0	4	–	5	–	0
North Carolina	2	–	3	–	0	4	–	5	–	0
Auburn	2	–	4	–	1	4	–	4	–	1
Maryland	1	–	2	–	1	3	–	3	–	3
NC State	1	–	4	–	1	2	–	4	–	2
LSU	0	–	3	–	0	5	–	4	–	0
Ole Miss	0	–	3	–	0	4	–	5	–	0
Clemson	0	–	3	–	0	2	–	6	–	0
Tennessee	0	–	4	–	0	3	–	5	–	0
$ – Conference champion; * – co-member of SIAA

The 1924 LSU Tigers football team represented Louisiana State University (LSU) during the 1924 college football season as a member of the Southern Conference (SoCon). The Tigers were led by head coach Mike Donahue in his second season and finished with a record of five wins and four losses (5–4 overall, 0–3 in the SoCon). This season featured the first game in the newly constructed Tiger Stadium.

== Schedule ==
Date	Opponent	Site	Result	Source
September 27	Spring Hill*	State Field; Baton Rouge, LA	W 7–6	
October 4	Southwestern Louisiana*	State Field; Baton Rouge, LA	W 31–7	
October 11	vs. Indiana*	Washington Park; Indianapolis, IN	W 20–14	
October 18	at Rice*	Rice Field; Houston, TX	W 12–0	
October 25	at Auburn	Rickwood Field; Birmingham, AL (rivalry)	L 0–3	
November 1	vs. Arkansas*	Fair Grounds; Shreveport, LA (rivalry)	L 7–10	
November 8	at Georgia Tech	Grant Field; Atlanta, GA	L 7–28	
November 15	Louisiana Normal*	State Field; Baton Rouge, LA	W 40–0	
November 27	Tulane^{†}	Tiger Stadium; Baton Rouge, LA (Battle for the Rag)	L 0–13	
*Non-conference game; ^{†}Homecoming
