= 1924 Auburn Tigers football team =

American college football season

1924 Auburn Tigers football
- Conference: Southern Conference
- Record: 4–4–1 (2–4–1 SoCon)
- Head coach: Boozer Pitts (2nd season)
- Captain: J. D. Lawrence
- Home stadium: Drake Field; Rickwood Field; Cramton Bowl

1924 Southern Conference football standings
	Conf.					Overall
Team	W		L		T	W		L		T
Alabama $	5	–	0	–	0	8	–	1	–	0
Florida	2	–	0	–	1	6	–	2	–	2
Georgia	5	–	1	–	0	7	–	3	–	0
Tulane	4	–	1	–	0	8	–	1	–	0
Washington and Lee	4	–	1	–	1	6	–	3	–	1
South Carolina	3	–	2	–	0	7	–	3	–	0
Sewanee *	3	–	2	–	0	6	–	4	–	0
Mississippi A&M	3	–	2	–	0	5	–	4	–	0
Virginia	3	–	2	–	0	5	–	4	–	0
Georgia Tech	3	–	2	–	1	5	–	3	–	1
Vanderbilt *	3	–	3	–	0	6	–	3	–	1
VPI	2	–	2	–	3	4	–	2	–	3
VMI	2	–	3	–	1	6	–	3	–	1
Kentucky	2	–	3	–	0	4	–	5	–	0
North Carolina	2	–	3	–	0	4	–	5	–	0
Auburn	2	–	4	–	1	4	–	4	–	1
Maryland	1	–	2	–	1	3	–	3	–	3
NC State	1	–	4	–	1	2	–	4	–	2
LSU	0	–	3	–	0	5	–	4	–	0
Ole Miss	0	–	3	–	0	4	–	5	–	0
Clemson	0	–	3	–	0	2	–	6	–	0
Tennessee	0	–	4	–	0	3	–	5	–	0
$ – Conference champion; * – co-member of SIAA

The 1924 Auburn Tigers football team represented Auburn University in the 1924 college football season. It was the Tigers' 33rd overall season and they competed as a member of the Southern Conference (SoCon). The team was led by head coach Boozer Pitts, in his second year, and played their home games at Drake Field in Auburn, Alabama. They finished with a record of four wins, four losses and one tie (4–4–1 overall, 2–4–1 in the SoCon).

== Schedule ==
Date	Opponent	Site	Result	Attendance	Source
September 27	at Birmingham–Southern*	Munger Bowl; Birmingham, AL	W 7–0		
October 4	Clemson^{†}	Drake Field; Auburn, AL (rivalry)	W 13–0		
October 11	vs. VPI	Mayo Island Park; Richmond, VA	T 0–0	5,000–7,000	
October 18	Howard (AL)*	Drake Field; Auburn, AL	W 17–0		
October 25	LSU	Rickwood Field; Birmingham, AL (rivalry)	W 3–0		
November 1	at Vanderbilt	Dudley Field; Nashville, TN	L 0–13		
November 8	Tulane	Cramton Bowl; Montgomery, AL (rivalry)	L 6–14	8,000	
November 15	vs. Georgia	Driving Park Stadium; Columbus, GA (rivalry)	L 0–6		
November 27	at Georgia Tech	Grant Field; Atlanta, GA (rivalry)	L 0–7		
*Non-conference game; ^{†}Homecoming
