= 1924 South Carolina Gamecocks football team =

American college football season

1924 South Carolina Gamecocks football
- Conference: Southern Conference
- Record: 7–3 (3–2 SoCon)
- Head coach: Sol Metzger (5th season)
- Captain: Frankie Meyer
- Home stadium: University Field

1924 Southern Conference football standings
	Conf.					Overall
Team	W		L		T	W		L		T
Alabama $	5	–	0	–	0	8	–	1	–	0
Florida	2	–	0	–	1	6	–	2	–	2
Georgia	5	–	1	–	0	7	–	3	–	0
Tulane	4	–	1	–	0	8	–	1	–	0
Washington and Lee	4	–	1	–	1	6	–	3	–	1
South Carolina	3	–	2	–	0	7	–	3	–	0
Sewanee *	3	–	2	–	0	6	–	4	–	0
Mississippi A&M	3	–	2	–	0	5	–	4	–	0
Virginia	3	–	2	–	0	5	–	4	–	0
Georgia Tech	3	–	2	–	1	5	–	3	–	1
Vanderbilt *	3	–	3	–	0	6	–	3	–	1
VPI	2	–	2	–	3	4	–	2	–	3
VMI	2	–	3	–	1	6	–	3	–	1
Kentucky	2	–	3	–	0	4	–	5	–	0
North Carolina	2	–	3	–	0	4	–	5	–	0
Auburn	2	–	4	–	1	4	–	4	–	1
Maryland	1	–	2	–	1	3	–	3	–	3
NC State	1	–	4	–	1	2	–	4	–	2
LSU	0	–	3	–	0	5	–	4	–	0
Ole Miss	0	–	3	–	0	4	–	5	–	0
Clemson	0	–	3	–	0	2	–	6	–	0
Tennessee	0	–	4	–	0	3	–	5	–	0
$ – Conference champion; * – co-member of SIAA

The 1924 South Carolina Gamecocks football team represented the University of South Carolina during the 1924 Southern Conference football season. Led by Sol Metzger in his fifth and final season as head coach, the Gamecocks compiled an overall record of 7–3 with a mark of 3–2 in conference play, tying for sixth place in the SoCon. The season was notable for its low scoring.

== Schedule ==
Date	Opponent	Site	Result	Source
September 27	Erskine*	University Field; Columbia, SC	W 47–0	
October 4	at Georgia	Sanford Field; Athens, GA	L 0–18	
October 11	NC State	University Field; Columbia, SC	W 10–0	
October 17	Presbyterian*	University Field; Columbia, SC	W 29–0	
October 23	Clemson	State Fairgrounds; Columbia, SC	W 3–0	
October 29	vs. The Citadel*	County Fairgrounds; Orangeburg, SC	W 14–3	
November 1	at North Carolina	Emerson Field; Chapel Hill, NC	W 10–7	
November 8	Furman*	University Field; Columbia, SC	L 0–10	
November 15	Sewanee	University Field; Columbia, SC	L 0–10	
November 27	Wake Forest*	University Field; Columbia, SC	W 7–0	
*Non-conference game
