= 1924 Kentucky Wildcats football team =

American college football season

1924 Kentucky Wildcats football
- Conference: Southern Conference
- Record: 4–5 (2–3 SoCon)
- Head coach: Fred J. Murphy (1st season)
- Captain: Curtis Sanders
- Home stadium: Stoll Field

1924 Southern Conference football standings
	Conf.					Overall
Team	W		L		T	W		L		T
Alabama $	5	–	0	–	0	8	–	1	–	0
Florida	2	–	0	–	1	6	–	2	–	2
Georgia	5	–	1	–	0	7	–	3	–	0
Tulane	4	–	1	–	0	8	–	1	–	0
Washington and Lee	4	–	1	–	1	6	–	3	–	1
South Carolina	3	–	2	–	0	7	–	3	–	0
Sewanee *	3	–	2	–	0	6	–	4	–	0
Mississippi A&M	3	–	2	–	0	5	–	4	–	0
Virginia	3	–	2	–	0	5	–	4	–	0
Georgia Tech	3	–	2	–	1	5	–	3	–	1
Vanderbilt *	3	–	3	–	0	6	–	3	–	1
VPI	2	–	2	–	3	4	–	2	–	3
VMI	2	–	3	–	1	6	–	3	–	1
Kentucky	2	–	3	–	0	4	–	5	–	0
North Carolina	2	–	3	–	0	4	–	5	–	0
Auburn	2	–	4	–	1	4	–	4	–	1
Maryland	1	–	2	–	1	3	–	3	–	3
NC State	1	–	4	–	1	2	–	4	–	2
LSU	0	–	3	–	0	5	–	4	–	0
Ole Miss	0	–	3	–	0	4	–	5	–	0
Clemson	0	–	3	–	0	2	–	6	–	0
Tennessee	0	–	4	–	0	3	–	5	–	0
$ – Conference champion; * – co-member of SIAA

The 1924 Kentucky Wildcats football team was an American football team that represented the University of Kentucky as a member of the Southern Conference during the 1924 college football season. In their first year under head coach Fred J. Murphy, the team compiled an overall record of 4–5 with a mark of 2–3 in conference play, tying for 14th place in the SoCon.

== Schedule ==
Date	Opponent	Site	Result	Source
October 4	Louisville*	Stoll Field; Lexington, KY (rivalry)	W 29–0	
October 11	Georgetown (KY)*	Stoll Field; Lexington, KY	W 42–0	
October 18	Washington and Lee	Stoll Field; Lexington, KY	L 7–10	
October 25	Sewanee	Stoll Field; Lexington, KY	W 7–0	
November 1	Centre*	Stoll Field; Lexington, KY (rivalry)	L 0–7	
November 8	at Alabama	Denny Field; Tuscaloosa, AL	L 7–42	
November 15	VMI	Stoll Field; Lexington, KY	L 3–10	
November 27	at Tennessee	Shields–Watkins Field; Knoxville, TN (rivalry)	W 27–6	
December 6	at West Virginia Wesleyan*	Laidley Field; Charleston, WV	L 7–24	
*Non-conference game
