= 1924 Roanoke Maroons football team =

American college football season

1924 Roanoke Maroons football
- Conference: Virginia–North Carolina Intercollegiate Athletic Conference
- Record: 4–3–2 (4–0–1 V–NCIAC)
- Head coach: Pinky Spruhan (11th season)
- Home stadium: College Field; Maher Field

The 1924 Roanoke Maroons football team represented Roanoke College as a member of the Virginia–North Carolina Intercollegiate Athletic Conference (V–NCIAC) during the 1924 college football season. Led by 11th-year head coach Pinky Spruhan, the Maroons compiled an overall record of 4–3–2, with a mark of 4–0–1 in conference play.

== Schedule ==
Date	Opponent	Site	Result	Source
September 27	at Washington and Lee*	Wilson Field; Lexington, VA	L 0–34	
October 4	Lenoir	College Field; Salem, VA	W 26–7	
October 11	at VMI*	Alumni Field; Lexington, VA	L 0–28	
October 18	at Concord State*	Bluefield, WV	L 3–6	
October 24	Hampden–Sydney	College Field; Salem, VA	W 9–0	
November 1	Randolph–Macon	College Field; Salem, VA	W 22–0	
November 8	Richmond	Maher Field; Roanoke, VA	W 9–0	
November 15	vs. William & Mary	Newport News, VA	T 7–7	
November 22	Maryville (TN)*	College Field; Salem, VA	T 3–3	
*Non-conference game
