= 1924 North Carolina Tar Heels football team =

American college football season

1924 North Carolina Tar Heels football
- Conference: Southern Conference
- Record: 4–5 (2–3 SoCon)
- Head coach: Bob Fetzer & Bill Fetzer (4th season)
- Captain: Pierce Matthews
- Home stadium: Emerson Field

1924 Southern Conference football standings
	Conf.					Overall
Team	W		L		T	W		L		T
Alabama $	5	–	0	–	0	8	–	1	–	0
Florida	2	–	0	–	1	6	–	2	–	2
Georgia	5	–	1	–	0	7	–	3	–	0
Tulane	4	–	1	–	0	8	–	1	–	0
Washington and Lee	4	–	1	–	1	6	–	3	–	1
South Carolina	3	–	2	–	0	7	–	3	–	0
Sewanee *	3	–	2	–	0	6	–	4	–	0
Mississippi A&M	3	–	2	–	0	5	–	4	–	0
Virginia	3	–	2	–	0	5	–	4	–	0
Georgia Tech	3	–	2	–	1	5	–	3	–	1
Vanderbilt *	3	–	3	–	0	6	–	3	–	1
VPI	2	–	2	–	3	4	–	2	–	3
VMI	2	–	3	–	1	6	–	3	–	1
Kentucky	2	–	3	–	0	4	–	5	–	0
North Carolina	2	–	3	–	0	4	–	5	–	0
Auburn	2	–	4	–	1	4	–	4	–	1
Maryland	1	–	2	–	1	3	–	3	–	3
NC State	1	–	4	–	1	2	–	4	–	2
LSU	0	–	3	–	0	5	–	4	–	0
Ole Miss	0	–	3	–	0	4	–	5	–	0
Clemson	0	–	3	–	0	2	–	6	–	0
Tennessee	0	–	4	–	0	3	–	5	–	0
$ – Conference champion; * – co-member of SIAA

The 1924 North Carolina Tar Heels football team represented the University of North Carolina (now known as the University of North Carolina at Chapel Hill) during the 1924 college football season as a member of the Southern Conference (SoCon). The Tar Heels were led by head coaches Bob Fetzer and Bill Fetzer in their fourth season and finished with a record of four wins and five losses (4–5 overall, 2–3 in the SoCon).

== Schedule ==
Date	Time	Opponent	Site	Result	Attendance	Source
September 27		at Wake Forest*	Gore Field; Wake Forest, NC (rivalry)	L 6–7		
October 4	3:00 p.m.	at Yale*	Yale Bowl; New Haven, CT	L 0–27	25,000	
October 11		Duke*	Emerson Field; Chapel Hill, NC (rivalry)	W 6–0	7,500	
October 16	2:30 p.m.	at NC State	Riddick Field; Raleigh, NC (rivalry)	W 10–0	15,000	
October 25		Maryland	Emerson Field; Chapel Hill, NC	L 0–6		
November 1	2:30 p.m.	South Carolina	Emerson Field; Chapel Hill, NC (rivalry)	L 7–10		
November 8	2:30 p.m.	VMI	Emerson Field; Chapel Hill, NC	W 3–0		
November 15	3:00 p.m.	at Davidson*	Richardson Athletic Field; Davidson, NC	W 6–0		
November 27	2:30 p.m.	at Virginia	Lambeth Field; Charlottesville, VA (rivalry)	L 0–7		
*Non-conference game; All times are in Eastern time
