= 1924 Tulane Green Wave football team =

American college football season

1924 Tulane Green Wave football
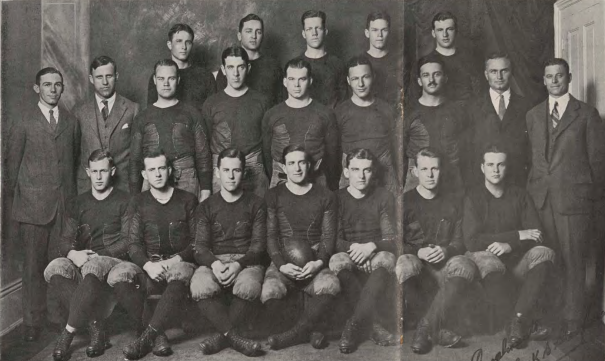
- Conference: Southern Conference
- Record: 8–1 (4–1 SoCon)
- Head coach: Clark Shaughnessy (9th season)
- Offensive scheme: Single-wing
- Captain: Brother Brown
- Home stadium: Second Tulane Stadium

1924 Southern Conference football standings
	Conf.					Overall
Team	W		L		T	W		L		T
Alabama $	5	–	0	–	0	8	–	1	–	0
Florida	2	–	0	–	1	6	–	2	–	2
Georgia	5	–	1	–	0	7	–	3	–	0
Tulane	4	–	1	–	0	8	–	1	–	0
Washington and Lee	4	–	1	–	1	6	–	3	–	1
South Carolina	3	–	2	–	0	7	–	3	–	0
Sewanee *	3	–	2	–	0	6	–	4	–	0
Mississippi A&M	3	–	2	–	0	5	–	4	–	0
Virginia	3	–	2	–	0	5	–	4	–	0
Georgia Tech	3	–	2	–	1	5	–	3	–	1
Vanderbilt *	3	–	3	–	0	6	–	3	–	1
VPI	2	–	2	–	3	4	–	2	–	3
VMI	2	–	3	–	1	6	–	3	–	1
Kentucky	2	–	3	–	0	4	–	5	–	0
North Carolina	2	–	3	–	0	4	–	5	–	0
Auburn	2	–	4	–	1	4	–	4	–	1
Maryland	1	–	2	–	1	3	–	3	–	3
NC State	1	–	4	–	1	2	–	4	–	2
LSU	0	–	3	–	0	5	–	4	–	0
Ole Miss	0	–	3	–	0	4	–	5	–	0
Clemson	0	–	3	–	0	2	–	6	–	0
Tennessee	0	–	4	–	0	3	–	5	–	0
$ – Conference champion; * – co-member of SIAA

The 1924 Tulane Green Wave football team was an American football team that represented Tulane University as a member of the Southern Conference (SoCon) during the 1924 college football season. In its ninth year under head coach Clark Shaughnessy, Tulane compiled a 8–1 record (4–1 in conference games), finished in fourth place in the SoCon, and outscored opponents by a total of 201 to 59.

== Schedule ==
Date	Opponent	Site	Result	Attendance	Source
September 27	Southwestern Louisiana*	Tulane Stadium; New Orleans, LA	W 14–0		
October 4	Mississippi College*	Tulane Stadium; New Orleans, LA	W 32–7		
October 11	Louisiana Tech*	Tulane Stadium; New Orleans, LA	W 42–12		
October 18	Vanderbilt	Tulane Stadium; New Orleans, LA	W 21–13	13,000	
October 25	Spring Hill*	Tulane Stadium; New Orleans, LA	W 33–0		
November 1	Mississippi A&M	Tulane Stadium; New Orleans, LA	L 14–6		
November 8	at Auburn	Cramton Bowl; Montgomery, AL (rivalry)	W 14–6	8,000	
November 15	Tennessee	Tulane Stadium; New Orleans, LA	W 26–7		
November 27	at LSU	Tiger Stadium; Baton Rouge, LA (Battle for the Rag)	W 13–0		
*Non-conference game
