= 1924 Maryland Aggies football team =

American college football season

1924 Maryland Aggies football
- Conference: Southern Conference
- Record: 3–3–3 (1–2–1 SoCon)
- Head coach: Curley Byrd (14th season)
- Home stadium: Byrd Stadium (original)

1924 Southern Conference football standings
	Conf.					Overall
Team	W		L		T	W		L		T
Alabama $	5	–	0	–	0	8	–	1	–	0
Florida	2	–	0	–	1	6	–	2	–	2
Georgia	5	–	1	–	0	7	–	3	–	0
Tulane	4	–	1	–	0	8	–	1	–	0
Washington and Lee	4	–	1	–	1	6	–	3	–	1
South Carolina	3	–	2	–	0	7	–	3	–	0
Sewanee *	3	–	2	–	0	6	–	4	–	0
Mississippi A&M	3	–	2	–	0	5	–	4	–	0
Virginia	3	–	2	–	0	5	–	4	–	0
Georgia Tech	3	–	2	–	1	5	–	3	–	1
Vanderbilt *	3	–	3	–	0	6	–	3	–	1
VPI	2	–	2	–	3	4	–	2	–	3
VMI	2	–	3	–	1	6	–	3	–	1
Kentucky	2	–	3	–	0	4	–	5	–	0
North Carolina	2	–	3	–	0	4	–	5	–	0
Auburn	2	–	4	–	1	4	–	4	–	1
Maryland	1	–	2	–	1	3	–	3	–	3
NC State	1	–	4	–	1	2	–	4	–	2
LSU	0	–	3	–	0	5	–	4	–	0
Ole Miss	0	–	3	–	0	4	–	5	–	0
Clemson	0	–	3	–	0	2	–	6	–	0
Tennessee	0	–	4	–	0	3	–	5	–	0
$ – Conference champion; * – co-member of SIAA

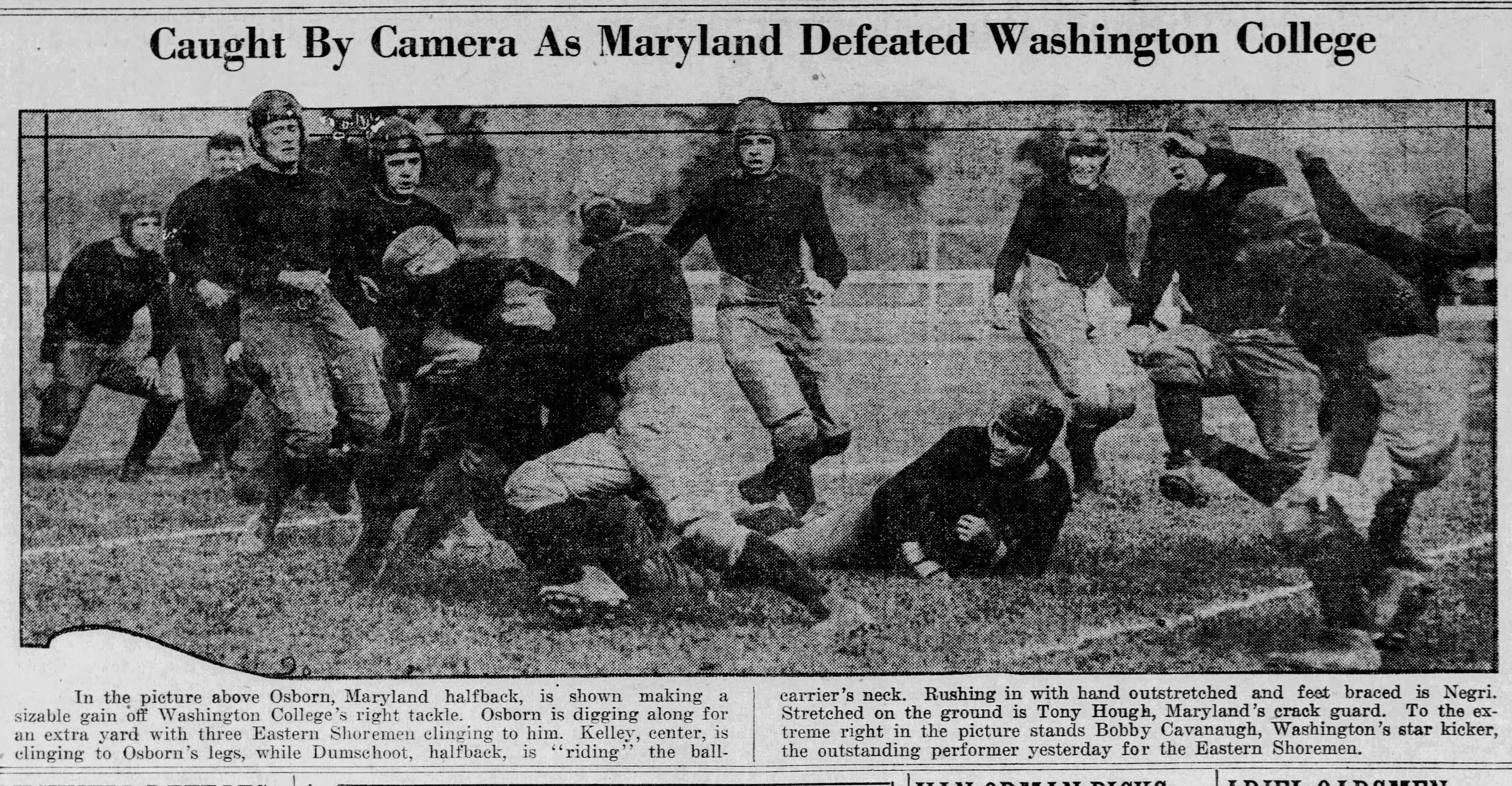

The 1924 Maryland Aggies football team was an American football team that represented the University of Maryland in the Southern Conference (SoCon) during the 1924 college football season. In their 14th season under head coach Curley Byrd, the Aggies compiled a 3–3–3 record (1–2–1 against SoCon opponents), finished 16th place in the conference, and were outscored by a total of 78 to 74.

== Schedule ==
Date	Opponent	Site	Result	Attendance	Source
September 27	Washington College*	Byrd Stadium; College Park, MD	W 23–0		
October 4	vs. Washington and Lee	Central High School Stadium; Washington, DC	L 7–19		
October 11	Richmond*	Byrd Stadium; College Park, MD	W 38–0		
October 18	vs. VPI	Central High School Stadium; Washington, DC	L 0–12		
October 25	at North Carolina	Emerson Field; Chapel Hill, NC	W 6–0		
November 1	at Catholic University*	Brookland Stadium; Washington, DC	T 0–0		
November 8	at Yale*	Yale Bowl; New Haven, CT	L 0–47	18,000	
November 15	NC State^{†}	Byrd Stadium; College Park, MD	T 0–0		
November 27	at Johns Hopkins*	Baltimore Stadium; Baltimore, MD	T 0–0	20,000	
*Non-conference game; ^{†}Homecoming
