= 1924 NC State Wolfpack football team =

American college football season

1924 NC State Wolfpack football
- Conference: Southern Conference
- Record: 2–6–2 (1–4–1 SoCon)
- Head coach: Buck Shaw (1st season)
- Home stadium: Riddick Stadium

1924 Southern Conference football standings
	Conf.					Overall
Team	W		L		T	W		L		T
Alabama $	5	–	0	–	0	8	–	1	–	0
Florida	2	–	0	–	1	6	–	2	–	2
Georgia	5	–	1	–	0	7	–	3	–	0
Tulane	4	–	1	–	0	8	–	1	–	0
Washington and Lee	4	–	1	–	1	6	–	3	–	1
South Carolina	3	–	2	–	0	7	–	3	–	0
Sewanee *	3	–	2	–	0	6	–	4	–	0
Mississippi A&M	3	–	2	–	0	5	–	4	–	0
Virginia	3	–	2	–	0	5	–	4	–	0
Georgia Tech	3	–	2	–	1	5	–	3	–	1
Vanderbilt *	3	–	3	–	0	6	–	3	–	1
VPI	2	–	2	–	3	4	–	2	–	3
VMI	2	–	3	–	1	6	–	3	–	1
Kentucky	2	–	3	–	0	4	–	5	–	0
North Carolina	2	–	3	–	0	4	–	5	–	0
Auburn	2	–	4	–	1	4	–	4	–	1
Maryland	1	–	2	–	1	3	–	3	–	3
NC State	1	–	4	–	1	2	–	4	–	2
LSU	0	–	3	–	0	5	–	4	–	0
Ole Miss	0	–	3	–	0	4	–	5	–	0
Clemson	0	–	3	–	0	2	–	6	–	0
Tennessee	0	–	4	–	0	3	–	5	–	0
$ – Conference champion; * – co-member of SIAA

The 1924 NC State Wolfpack football team was an American football team that represented the North Carolina State College of Agriculture and Engineering (now known as North Carolina State University) as a member of the Southern Conference (SoCon) during the 1924 college football season. In their first season under head coach Buck Shaw, NC State compiled a 2–6–2 record.

== Schedule ==
Date	Opponent	Site	Result	Attendance	Source
September 27	Duke*	Riddick Stadium; Raleigh, NC (rivalry)	W 14–0		
October 4	at Penn State*	New Beaver Field; University Park, PA	L 6–51	3,500	
October 11	at South Carolina	University Field; Columbia, SC	L 0–10		
October 16	North Carolina	Riddick Stadium; Raleigh, NC (rivalry)	L 0–10	15,000	
October 25	vs. VMI	Mayo Park; Richmond, VA	L 7–17		
October 31	vs. Davidson*	Sandhills Fairgrounds; Pinehurst, NC	T 10–10		
November 8	VPI	Riddick Stadium; Raleigh, NC	W 6–3		
November 15	at Maryland	Byrd Stadium; College Park, MD	T 0–0		
November 22	Wake Forest*	Riddick Stadium; Raleigh, NC (rivalry)	L 0–12	6,000	
November 27	Washington and Lee	Riddick Stadium; Raleigh, NC	L 0–34		
*Non-conference game
