= Buck Spinks =

American football player and coach, United States Army officer (1903–1968)

Leslie "Buck" Spinks
Biographical details
- Born: July 1, 1903; Thomasville, Alabama, U.S.
- Died: March 15, 1968 (aged 66); Marion, Alabama, U.S.

Playing career
- 1923–1925: Auburn
- Position: End

Coaching career (HC unless noted)

Men's basketball
- 1926–1928: Auburn (freshmen)
- 1937–1940: Bates
- 1945–1946: Bates

Football
- 1926–1928: Auburn (assistant)
- 1929–1940: Bates (freshmen)

Head coaching record
- Overall: 17–26
- Military career
- Allegiance: United States
- Branch: United States Army
- Service years: 1940–1958
- Rank: Colonel
- Other work: Commandant of cadets at Marion Military Institute

Leslie "Buck" Spinks (July 1, 1903 – March 15, 1968) was an American athlete, coach, and military officer who played football at Auburn University (then known as Alabama Polytechnic Institute), coached men's basketball and football at Bates College, and was the commandant of cadets at Marion Military Institute.

== Early life ==
Spinks was born in Thomasville, Alabama on July 1, 1903, to John B. and Jane (Norwood) Spinks. He played football, baseball, and basketball at Thomasville High School and was an end for the Alabama Polytechnic Institute football team. While at API, he was commissioned a second lieutenant in the United States Army Reserve. He received a Bachelor of Science in civil engineering from Alabama Polytechnic Institute in 1926.

== Coaching ==
After graduating from API, Spinks remained with the school as an assistant football coach and freshman basketball coach. When former API football coach Dave Morey was hired by Bates College in 1929, Spinks joined him as varsity line and freshman football coach. Bates won the Maine state championship in 1929 and 1930 and in 1932, Morey and Spinks were rewarded with three-year contract extensions. That same year, Spinks married Kathleen Sanders, a physical education instructor for women at Bates. They had two daughters. In 1934, Spinks became the head coach of the school's inaugural golf team. In 1936, Bates revived its basketball program and named Spinks head coach. The freshman team began play that winter and a varsity squad was assembled the following season.

While at Bates, Spinks took summer courses at New York University and earned his master's degree in education in 1937.

== Military ==
In December 1940, Spinks, then a captain in the Army Reserve, was ordered to report for military service. He was assigned to Camp Edwards and served as the installation's recreation officer. In 1942, he was promoted to major and sent to Fort Sill for four weeks of training at the United States Army Field Artillery School. He was later promoted to lieutenant colonel and, after a course at Fort Bragg, was sent to Camp Gordon to activate a new field artillery observation battalion, which was present when the Soviet and American troops met at the Elbe River on April 25, 1945. Spinks returned to Maine in November 1945 and resumed his coaching duties. However, the following year, Spinks left Bates for a career in the Army. He sold his home in Greene, Maine to fellow Bates coach Ducky Pond.

Spinks was integrated into the regular army on July 5, 1946. After a year at the United States Army Command and General Staff College at Fort Leavenworth, he was assigned to the United States European Command. From 1950 to 1952, he was head of the department of observation at the artillery center at Fort Sill. From 1953 to 1956, he was the Army attaché at the Embassy of the United States in Dublin. He then served as the chief Reserve Officers' Training Corps advisor in Alabama. In 1957, he represented the United States Army Military District of Alabama on the court martial board that heard the case against John C. Nickerson Jr. He retired from the Army on August 31, 1958.

== Marion Military Institute ==
In June 1958, Spinks was named commandant of cadets at Marion Military Institute. He joined the school on September 1, 1958, and remained there until his death on March 15, 1968.
