= Charlie Van Horn =

American football player (1901–1994)

Profile
- Position: Back

Personal information
- Born: November 23, 1901; Washington, D.C., U.S.
- Died: January 5, 1994 (aged 92); Arlington, Virginia, U.S.
- Listed height: 6 ft 2 in (1.88 m)
- Listed weight: 185 lb (84 kg)

Career information
- High school: Allegheny Prep (PA)
- College: Washington & Lee

Career history
- Buffalo Bisons (1927); Orange Tornadoes (1929)

Career statistics
- Games: 8
- Stats at Pro Football Reference

Charles Edgar Van Horn (November 23, 1901 – January 5, 1994) was an American football player. He played college football at Washington & Lee and professional football in the National Football League (NFL) as a back for the Buffalo Bisons in 1927 and for the Orange Tornadoes in 1929. He appeared in eight NFL games, four as a starter.
