= 1924 Georgia Bulldogs football team =

American college football season

1924 Georgia Bulldogs football
- Conference: Southern Conference
- Record: 7–3 (5–1 SoCon)
- Head coach: George Cecil Woodruff (2nd season)
- Captain: John Fletcher
- Home stadium: Sanford Field

1924 Southern Conference football standings
	Conf.					Overall
Team	W		L		T	W		L		T
Alabama $	5	–	0	–	0	8	–	1	–	0
Florida	2	–	0	–	1	6	–	2	–	2
Georgia	5	–	1	–	0	7	–	3	–	0
Tulane	4	–	1	–	0	8	–	1	–	0
Washington and Lee	4	–	1	–	1	6	–	3	–	1
South Carolina	3	–	2	–	0	7	–	3	–	0
Sewanee *	3	–	2	–	0	6	–	4	–	0
Mississippi A&M	3	–	2	–	0	5	–	4	–	0
Virginia	3	–	2	–	0	5	–	4	–	0
Georgia Tech	3	–	2	–	1	5	–	3	–	1
Vanderbilt *	3	–	3	–	0	6	–	3	–	1
VPI	2	–	2	–	3	4	–	2	–	3
VMI	2	–	3	–	1	6	–	3	–	1
Kentucky	2	–	3	–	0	4	–	5	–	0
North Carolina	2	–	3	–	0	4	–	5	–	0
Auburn	2	–	4	–	1	4	–	4	–	1
Maryland	1	–	2	–	1	3	–	3	–	3
NC State	1	–	4	–	1	2	–	4	–	2
LSU	0	–	3	–	0	5	–	4	–	0
Ole Miss	0	–	3	–	0	4	–	5	–	0
Clemson	0	–	3	–	0	2	–	6	–	0
Tennessee	0	–	4	–	0	3	–	5	–	0
$ – Conference champion; * – co-member of SIAA

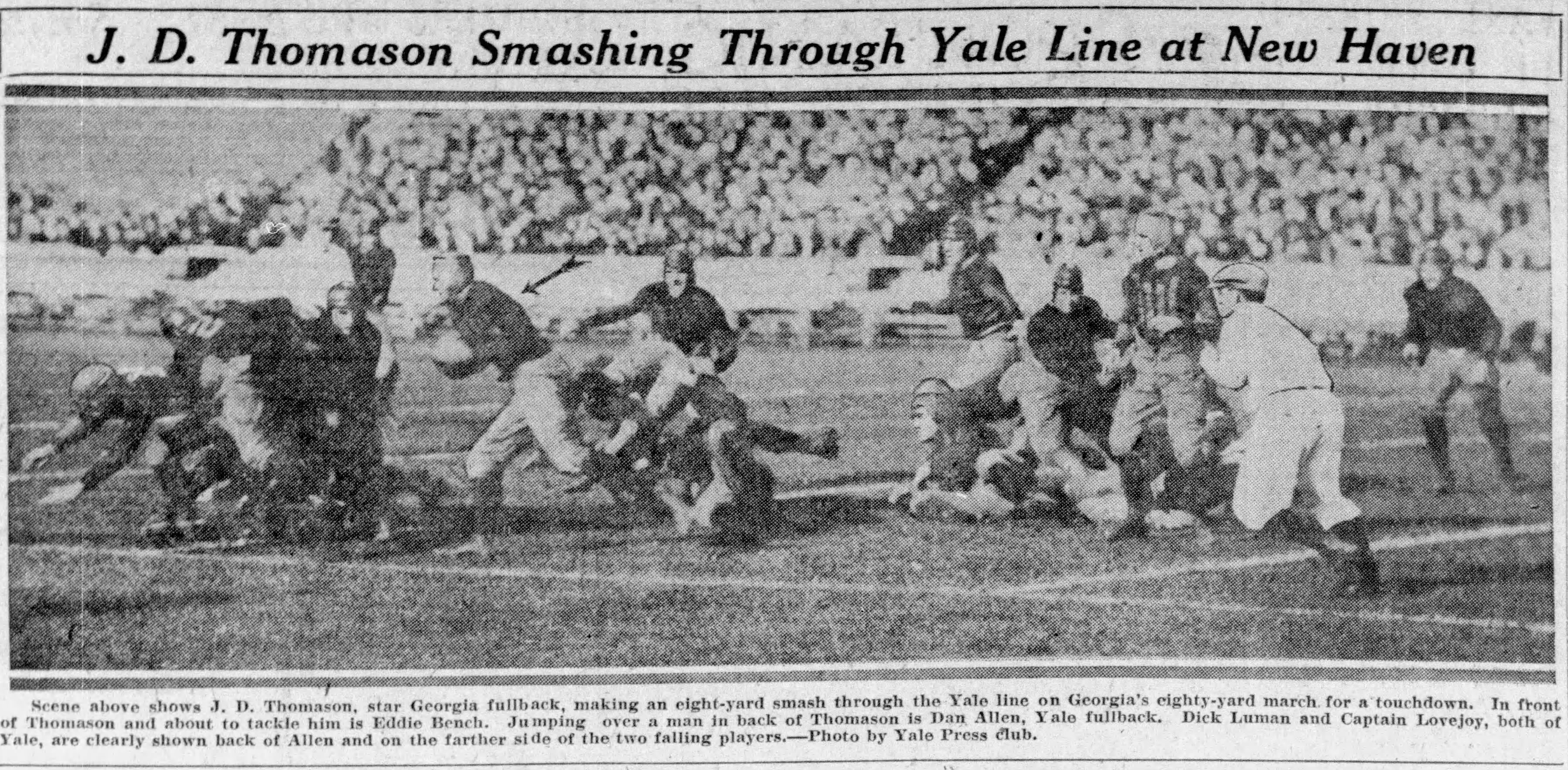
An article picture of the Georgia team smashing through the Yale University team

The 1924 Georgia Bulldogs football team represented the University of Georgia during the 1924 Southern Conference football season. In the team's second season under head coach George Cecil Woodruff, the Bulldogs completed the season with a record of 7–3. It included a narrow 7–6 loss to football powerhouse Yale. The other losses in the season came in the last two games against Southern Conference (SoCon) champion Alabama and Southern champion Centre. Six of the seven wins in the season were shutouts.

The season was also notable for the victory over Vanderbilt by a single Scrappy Moore drop kick,' in which All-American Vanderbilt end Lynn Bomar also suffered his career ending injury. Moore's field goal was the last made by a Bulldog until seventeen years later when Frank Sinkwich did so against Florida with a broken jaw in 1941.

All-Southerns included end Smack Thompson and tackle Jim Taylor.

== Schedule ==
Date	Opponent	Site	Result	Attendance	Source
September 27	Mercer*	Sanford Field; Athens, GA	W 26–7	8,000	
October 4	South Carolina	Sanford Field; Athens, GA (rivalry)	W 18–0		
October 11	at Yale*	Yale Bowl; New Haven, CT	L 6–7		
October 18	vs. Furman*	Athletic Park; Augusta, GA	W 23–0		
October 25	at Vanderbilt	Dudley Field; Nashville, TN (rivalry)	W 3–0		
November 1	Tennessee^{†}	Sanford Field; Athens, GA (rivalry)	W 33–0		
November 8	at Virginia	Lambeth Field; Charlottesville, VA	W 7–0		
November 15	vs. Auburn	Driving Park Stadium; Columbus, GA (rivalry)	W 6–0		
November 27	at Alabama	Rickwood Field; Birmingham, AL (rivalry)	L 0–33	16,000	
November 29	at Centre*	Cheek Field; Danville, KY	L 7–14		
*Non-conference game; ^{†}Homecoming
