= 1924 Sewanee Tigers football team =

American college football season

1924 Sewanee Tigers football
- Conference: Southern Conference
- Record: 6–4 (3–2 SoCon)
- Head coach: M. S. Bennett (2nd season)
- Captains: George Millard; Eugene Harris
- Home stadium: Hardee Field

1924 Southern Conference football standings
	Conf.					Overall
Team	W		L		T	W		L		T
Alabama $	5	–	0	–	0	8	–	1	–	0
Florida	2	–	0	–	1	6	–	2	–	2
Georgia	5	–	1	–	0	7	–	3	–	0
Tulane	4	–	1	–	0	8	–	1	–	0
Washington and Lee	4	–	1	–	1	6	–	3	–	1
South Carolina	3	–	2	–	0	7	–	3	–	0
Sewanee *	3	–	2	–	0	6	–	4	–	0
Mississippi A&M	3	–	2	–	0	5	–	4	–	0
Virginia	3	–	2	–	0	5	–	4	–	0
Georgia Tech	3	–	2	–	1	5	–	3	–	1
Vanderbilt *	3	–	3	–	0	6	–	3	–	1
VPI	2	–	2	–	3	4	–	2	–	3
VMI	2	–	3	–	1	6	–	3	–	1
Kentucky	2	–	3	–	0	4	–	5	–	0
North Carolina	2	–	3	–	0	4	–	5	–	0
Auburn	2	–	4	–	1	4	–	4	–	1
Maryland	1	–	2	–	1	3	–	3	–	3
NC State	1	–	4	–	1	2	–	4	–	2
LSU	0	–	3	–	0	5	–	4	–	0
Ole Miss	0	–	3	–	0	4	–	5	–	0
Clemson	0	–	3	–	0	2	–	6	–	0
Tennessee	0	–	4	–	0	3	–	5	–	0
$ – Conference champion; * – co-member of SIAA

1924 Southern Intercollegiate Athletic Association football standings
	Conf.					Overall
Team	W		L		T	W		L		T
Centre +	1	–	0	–	0	5	–	1	–	1
Oglethorpe +	5	–	0	–	0	6	–	3	–	1
Mississippi College	2	–	0	–	1	2	–	5	–	1
Newberry	4	–	1	–	0	8	–	2	–	0
Mercer	4	–	1	–	1	5	–	3	–	2
Sewanee*	2	–	1	–	0	6	–	4	–	0
The Citadel	4	–	2	–	0	6	–	4	–	0
Louisville	2	–	1	–	0	3	–	4	–	1
Millsaps	1	–	1	–	0	3	–	5	–	1
Georgetown (KY)	1	–	1	–	0	1	–	4	–	0
Transylvania	1	–	2	–	0	6	–	2	–	0
Furman	1	–	2	–	0	5	–	5	–	0
Wofford	2	–	4	–	0	3	–	7	–	0
Howard (AL)	1	–	3	–	0	3	–	5	–	1
Presbyterian	1	–	3	–	0	1	–	6	–	1
Vanderbilt*	0	–	1	–	0	6	–	3	–	1
Louisiana College	0	–	1	–	0	0	–	1	–	0
Western Kentucky	0	–	2	–	0	4	–	6	–	0
Erskine	0	–	4	–	0	1	–	7	–	0
Chattanooga	0	–	5	–	0	1	–	7	–	1
+ – Conference co-champions; * – co-member of SoCon

The 1924 Sewanee Tigers football team represented the Sewanee Tigers of Sewanee: The University of the South during the 1924 Southern Conference football season. It was the team's first season in the Southern Conference, and features its last victory over rival Vanderbilt. Sewanee was also a co-member of the Southern Intercollegiate Athletic Association in 1924, its last season as a member. The game against Carson-Newman was forfeited in their favor.

== Schedule ==
Date	Opponent	Site	Result	Attendance	Source
September 20	Transylvania*	Hardee Field; Sewanee, TN	W 27–0		
September 27	Southwestern (TN)*	Hardee Field; Sewanee, TN (rivalry)	W 7–0		
October 4	Carson–Newman*	Hardee Field; Sewanee, TN	W 0–12		
October 11	at Texas A&M*	Fair Park Stadium; Dallas, TX	L 0–7		
October 18	at Alabama	Rickwood Field; Birmingham, AL	L 0–14	10,000	
October 25	at Kentucky	Stoll Field; Lexington, KY	L 0–7		
November 1	at Oglethorpe*	Spiller Field; Atlanta, GA	L 0–7		
November 8	vs. Ole Miss	Russwood Park; Memphis, TN	W 21–0		
November 15	at South Carolina	University Field; Columbia, SC	W 10–0		
November 27	at Vanderbilt	Dudley Field; Nashville, TN (rivalry)	W 16–0	18,500	
*Non-conference game
