= 1924 Stanford football team =

American college football season

1924 Stanford football

PCC co-champion

Rose Bowl, L 10–27 vs. Notre Dame
- Conference: Pacific Coast Conference
- Record: 7–1–1 (3–0–1 PCC)
- Head coach: Pop Warner (1st season)
- Offensive scheme: Double-wing
- Captain: Jim Lawson
- Home stadium: Stanford Stadium

Uniform

1924 Pacific Coast Conference football standings
	Conf.					Overall
Team	W		L		T	W		L		T
No. 5 Stanford ^ +	3	–	0	–	1	7	–	1	–	1
No. 2 California +	2	–	0	–	2	8	–	0	–	2
Washington	3	–	1	–	1	8	–	1	–	1
No. 7 USC	2	–	1	–	0	9	–	2	–	0
Idaho	4	–	2	–	0	5	–	2	–	1
Oregon	2	–	2	–	1	4	–	2	–	3
Oregon Agricultural	1	–	4	–	0	3	–	5	–	0
Washington State	0	–	4	–	1	1	–	5	–	2
Montana	0	–	3	–	0	4	–	4	–	0
+ – Conference co-champions; ^ – Selected as Rose Bowl representative; Rankings from Dickinson System

The 1924 Stanford football team represented Stanford University as a member of the Pacific Coast Conference (PCC) during 1924 college football season. Led by first-year head coach was Pop Warner, Stanford compiled an overall record of 7–1–1 with a mark of 3–0–1 in conference play, winning the program's first PCC title as co-champions with California. Stanford made its second bowl game appearance, losing to Notre Dame 27–10 in the Rose Bowl.

Warner was hired from the University of Pittsburgh, where he had led the Panthers to three national championships. Andrew Kerr, who had been Stanford's head coach the previous two season, remained with the team as an assistant coach under Warner. Claude E. Thornhill was the team's line coach. Ernie Nevers starred at fullback and was later inducted into both the College Football Hall of Fame and the Pro Football Hall of Fame. Stanford was undefeated in the regular season and

== Schedule ==
Date	Opponent	Site	Result	Attendance	Source
October 4	Occidental*	Stanford Stadium; Stanford, CA	W 20–6		
October 11	Olympic Club*	Stanford Stadium; Stanford, CA	W 7–0		
October 18	Oregon	Stanford Stadium; Stanford, CA	W 28–13		
October 25	vs. Idaho	Multnomah Field; Portland, OR	W 3–0		
October 31	Santa Clara*	Stanford Stadium; Stanford, CA	W 20–0		
November 8	vs. Utah*	California Memorial Stadium; Berkeley, CA	W 30–0	5,000	
November 15	Montana	Stanford Stadium; Stanford, CA	W 41–3		
November 22	at California	California Memorial Stadium; Berkeley, CA (Big Game)	T 20–20	98,000	
January 1, 1925	vs. Notre Dame*	Rose Bowl; Pasadena, CA (Rose Bowl, rivalry)	L 10–27	60,000	
*Non-conference game

== Season summary ==
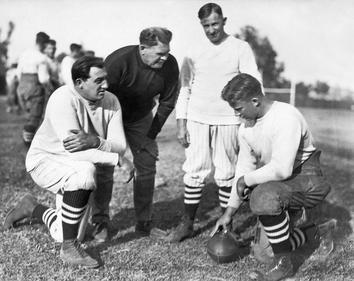
Line coach Claude E. Thornhill, head coach Pop Warner, assistant Andrew Kerr, and team captain Jim Lawson

The team played its home games at Stanford Stadium in Stanford, California, but had the unusual circumstance of playing an additional "home" game at California Memorial Stadium in Berkeley, California, home of rival California. The situation occurred after Stanford and California, convinced that fellow PCC member USC was guilty of recruiting violations, announced they would sever athletic ties with USC. In response, USC canceled its upcoming away game at Stanford, leaving Stanford with a hole in its schedule. Concerned that one fewer game would jeopardize the team's chance to win the conference, Stanford hurriedly scheduled a last-minute game with Utah. However, since Stanford Stadium was already reserved by the freshman team, California agreed to let Stanford play the game in Berkeley, which Stanford dominated, 30–0.

Stanford returned to Berkeley as the visiting team two weeks later for the Big Game to determine the PCC championship, facing off against defending PCC champion California, who was also undefeated and had won the past five Big Games. In fact, Stanford had not won a Big Game since 1914, when both teams were still playing rugby instead of football. Stanford rallied from a 14-point fourth quarter deficit to force a 20–20 tie and win the conference co-championship.

After winning the PCC, Stanford faced Notre Dame in the 1925 Rose Bowl. Eight turnovers doomed Stanford to a 27–10 loss to the Irish, which was led by coach Knute Rockne and the backfield known as The Four Horsemen of Notre Dame. This was the first meeting of the teams, which began a rivalry series that continues to this day.
