= Andy Smith (American football) =

American football player (1883–1926)

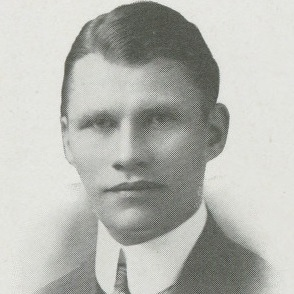
- Smith pictured in Debris 1914, Purdue yearbook

Biographical details
- Born: September 10, 1883; Du Bois, Pennsylvania, U.S.
- Died: January 8, 1926 (aged 42); Philadelphia, Pennsylvania, U.S.

Playing career
- 1901–1902: Penn State
- 1903–1904: Penn
- Position: Fullback

Coaching career (HC unless noted)
- 1905–1908: Penn (assistant)
- 1909–1912: Penn
- 1913–1915: Purdue
- 1916–1925: California

Head coaching record
- Overall: 116–32–13
- Bowls: 1–0–1

Accomplishments and honors

Championships
- 4 national (1920–1923); 6 PCC (1918, 1920–1924)

Awards
- Consensus All-American (1904)
- College Football Hall of Fame; Inducted in 1951 (profile)

Andrew Latham Smith (September 10, 1883 – January 8, 1926) was an American college football player and coach. He served as the head football coach at the University of Pennsylvania (1909–1912), Purdue University (1913–1915), and the University of California, Berkeley (1916–1925), compiling a career head coaching record of 116–32–13. As head coach of the California Golden Bears football program, Smith guided his "Wonder Teams" to a record of 74–16–7, captured five Pacific Coast Conference titles, and three national championships. Smith was the winningest football coach in school history until he was surpassed by Jeff Tedford in 2011. He was inducted into the College Football Hall of Fame in 1951.

== Early life ==
Andrew Latham Smith was born in Dubois, Pennsylvania on September 10, 1883. As a freshman, he played for Penn State as a fullback. He shined at his position, both fearless and dominating on the field. In two years, he was convinced to transfer to UPenn, then a superior program. There, in his senior season of 1904, he was named first-team All America for the national champion Quakers. After college, he entered the workforce with a degree in chemistry.

== Coaching career ==
=== Early coaching career ===
Smith returned to Penn in 1905 as the coach of the freshmen team and in 1909, when he was 26, he became the head coach of Penn until 1912. During those four years Smith had 30 wins, 10 losses and 3 ties. Following this success he switched to Purdue in 1913, where until 1915, he went 12–6–3.

=== Cal and the "Wonder Teams" ===
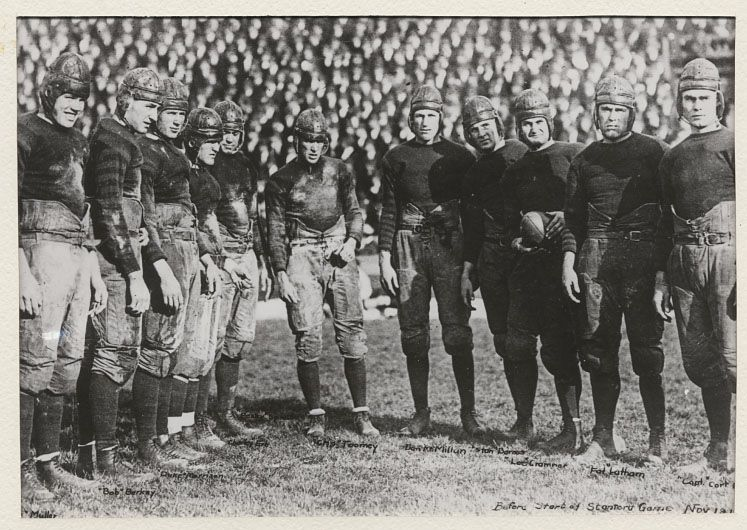
1920 Cal "Wonder Team"

The University of California had fielded a competitive football team since 1886. However, in 1906 it began playing rugby instead of football. This was because by that time football was considered a dangerous sport that could lead to serious injuries. California switched back to football in 1915, partly due to the fact that by that time rule changes made the game considerably safer. Due to his reputation, Smith was recruited to come out west and became the first head coach of California's golden era.

In 1916, his first year at Cal, Smith posted 6 wins, 4 losses and 3 ties. In 1918, Cal won its first Pacific Coast Conference (PCC) championship. Also in 1918 Smith hired future Cal football and basketball head coach Clarence Nibs Price as his assistant. Price had a southern California connection and was able to recruit key players to the team including Harold "Brick" Muller. The 1919 freshmen team went 11-1 and became the core of next year's varsity squad, to be known as the "Wonder Team." The 1920 Golden Bears team won all 9 games, outscored their opponents, 510 to 14, and capped off the season by defeating Ohio State in the Tournament of Roses East-West Game (now known as the Rose Bowl) 28–0. The NCAA has officially recognized them as the national champion of that season, the first from the Pacific Coast. "The Wonder Team at California in 1920 changed the entire picture of Western football."

Next year the 1921 Golden Bears also finished undefeated and were again invited to play in the Rose Bowl. Smith initially declined this invitation because he thought it was problematic that Cal's opponent, a little known team named the Washington and Jefferson Presidents, had players better than the average college, and at the same time had scholarship requirements well below California's. Eventually Smith agreed to the match. With California being the overwhelming favorite, the match went nothing like it was expected. Because of the heavy rain the night before, it was played in a virtual mud pit. Both defenses were able to hold off their opponents and the game finished in a 0–0 tie. This Rose Bowl was Smith's last.

The 1922 team was also undefeated and won the PCC. And same with the 1923 team. Both years the teams were invited to the Rose Bowl, however because of Smith's continuing disputes with the Rose Bowl committee, California declined both invitations. Like the 1920 team, the 1921 and 1922 teams are recognized as a national champion by the NCAA. On January 1, 1925, instead of the Rose Bowl, the 1924 Bears played an independently scheduled game against Pennsylvania at California's Memorial Stadium. Cal had 7 wins, 0 losses, and 2 ties, while 1924 Penn had 9 wins and 1 tie. Some consider Penn to be the best team of that year. California won that game 14–0. During an incredible five-season span from 1920 to 1924, Smith's "Wonder Teams" went undefeated, running up a record of 44 wins, 0 losses and 4 ties.

Even though the two had never met during the Roaring Twenties, Smith's "Wonder Teams" are thought to rival Knute Rockne's Notre Dame teams. Furthermore, when in 1960 the Helms Athletic Foundation considered both the Wonder Teams and the Four Horsemen among others, it crowned the 1920 Cal Bears as the greatest football team in American history.

== Strategy and approach to coaching ==
Smith said: "There are four mental qualifications necessary for success -- Aggressiveness, Obedience, Concentration and Determination. Add to this, Harmonious co-operation and you have the making of a real team." Always tough on his players, Smith drilled them until a technique was perfected regardless of the time that it took. Despite this, his players were known to idolize Smith, for they felt his respect towards them and his commitment to the team.

=== "Kick and wait for the breaks" ===
Smith's strategy is encapsulated in a motto: "Kick and wait for the breaks." He became known for his emphasis on the kicking game and defense-oriented strategy out of the short punt formation. During this era, the ball was often moved up the field not through offensive plays, but rather through punting. For Smith this was standard when the ball was held deep in one's territory. And once the opposing team got the ball, the defense was relied on to make the other team's offense lose yards or fumble. To confuse the opponent, the punting could be done on first or second downs. If the opponent's safeties were close to the line of scrimmage, anticipating a short pass or a run, then the ball could be kicked over their heads resulting in a longer punt. This was repeated until a breakthrough play like a long yard rush would eventually occur and flip the field position. It was not uncommon for a team to kick more than 40 punts a game.

Smith also became known for trick plays such as the now-classic lateral to the halfback followed by a long, forward pass. At the time, because of the plump, rugby-like ball, long passes were unanticipated. Brick Muller, both an offensive and defensive star of the Wonder Teams, became known for this play. His 50-yard passes were previously thought impossible.

== Death and legacy ==
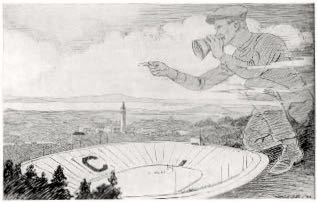
Tribute to Smith in 1926 Big Game program

While in Philadelphia shortly after the 1925 season, Smith was hospitalized with pneumonia. Several weeks later on January 8, 1926, he died at age 42 at the Hospital of the University of Pennsylvania in Philadelphia. He left no family, all of his $30,000 estate going to the Berkeley community, including the Elks Club, California chapter of his fraternity Sigma Alpha Epsilon, and California Skull & Keys Society, with $10,000 going towards football scholarships.

Smith's memorial service was held on January 16 at the gates of California Memorial Stadium, and in accordance with his wishes, his ashes were scattered over the stadium field. In 1927, the Andy Smith Bench on the sideline was dedicated in his honor. Built 103 years ago in 1923, the stadium is still known as "The House that Andy built" because the Wonder Teams' season tickets completely paid for it. Smith was inducted into the College Football Hall of Fame in 1951.

Both of the following quotes are inscribed on the Memorial Stadium's Andy Smith Bench -

- "We do not want men who will lie down bravely to die, but men who will fight valiantly to live" and
- "Winning is not everything; it is far better to play the game squarely and lose than to win at the sacrifice of an ideal."

The first was Andy Smith's coaching creed and the second was reportedly said by him during his last interview in Philadelphia.

In 1949, Garff Wilson, professor of dramatic art and speech, was asked to write a eulogy for Andy Smith, which was delivered by the ASUC president at the annual Big Game Bonfire Rally. Since then, the Andy Smith Eulogy has been delivered annually by candlelight at the conclusion of the bonfire.

=== Coaching tree ===
Smith often hired his former players as his assistant coaches. Walter Gordon who played on both offensive and defensive lines and became a third-team All American in 1918. Shortly after graduating, he was hired as an assistant coach and likely became the first African-American coach at a predominantly white college or university. Similarly, after graduating Brick Muller was hired by Smith to coach the defensive ends.

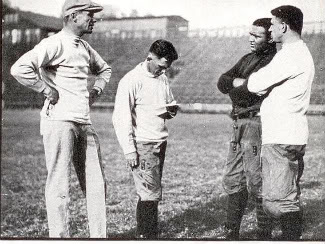
1922 From left: Smith, Nibs Price, Walter Gordon, and Albert Rosenthal.

Smith's coaching tree includes:

1. Ernest Cozens
2. Charles F. Erb
3. Walter A. Gordon
4. Edwin C. Horrell
5. Leroy Mercer
6. Brick Muller
7. Alvin Pierson
8. Nibs Price
9. Crip Toomey

== Head coaching record ==
Year	Team	Overall	Conference	Standing	Bowl/playoffs
Penn Quakers (Independent) (1909–1912)
1909	Penn	7–1–2			
1910	Penn	9–1–1			
1911	Penn	7–4			
1912	Penn	7–4			
Penn:		30–10–3			
Purdue Boilermakers (Western Conference) (1913–1915)
1913	Purdue	4–1–2	2–1–2	4th	
1914	Purdue	5–2	2–2	T–4th	
1915	Purdue	3–3–1	2–2	5th	
Purdue:		12–6–3	6–5–2		
California Golden Bears (Pacific Coast Conference) (1916–1925)
1916	California	6–4–1	0–3	T–3rd	
1917	California	5–5–1	2–1	2nd	
1918	California	7–2	2–0	1st	
1919	California	6–2–1	2–2	T–3rd	
1920	California	9–0	3–0	1st	W Rose
1921	California	9–0–1	4–0	1st	T Rose
1922	California	9–0	4–0	1st	
1923	California	9–0–1	5–0	1st	
1924	California	8–0–2	2–0–2	T–1st	
1925	California	6–3	2–2	5th	
California:		74–16–7	26–8–2		
Total:		116–32–13			
National championship Conference title Conference division title or championship game berth
