= Jim Lawson (American football) =

American football player (1902–1989)

Profile
- Positions: End and Placekicker

Personal information
- Born: March 11, 1902; Chelsea, Indiana, U.S.
- Died: January 3, 1989 (aged 86); Carmel-by-the-Sea, California, U.S.
- Listed height: 5 ft 11 in (1.80 m)
- Listed weight: 190 lb (86 kg)

Career information
- High school: Long Beach Polytechnic (Long Beach, California)
- College: Stanford

Career history
- Los Angeles Wildcats (1926); New York Yankees (1927)

Awards and highlights
- Consensus All-American (1924); 2× First-team All-Pacific Coast (1923, 1924)
- Stats at Pro Football Reference

James Willmer Lawson (March 11, 1902 – January 3, 1989) was an American football end and placekicker. He played college football for the Stanford football team of Stanford University, and was a consensus first-team All-American in 1924. He played professionally for the New York Yankees of the National Football League (NFL), and the Los Angeles Wildcats of the American Football League.

== Early life and college ==
James Willmer Lawson was born on March 11, 1902, in Chelsea, Indiana. He attended Long Beach Polytechnic High School in Long Beach, California.

Lawson was Stanford University's first All-American, a consensus selection, in 1924. The 1924 Stanford football team went 7–1–1 and appeared in the 1925 Rose Bowl against Notre Dame in a losing effort. Lawson was also named first-team All-Pacific Coast Conference at end by the United Press in both 1923 and 1924. He was inducted into the Stanford Athletics Hall of Fame.

== Professional career ==
Lawson kicked four extra points and two field goals for the Los Angeles Wildcats in 1926. He played in 11 games for the New York Yankees in 1927.

== Personal life ==
Lawson died on January 3, 1989, in Carmel-by-the-Sea, California.
