= Notre Dame–Stanford football rivalry =

American college football rivalry

- Notre Dame Fighting Irish Stanford Cardinal
- First meeting: January 1, 1925; Notre Dame 27, Stanford 10
- Latest meeting: October 10, 2026; Notre Dame 58, Stanford 7
- Next meeting: November 27, 2027
- Stadiums: Notre Dame Stadium; Notre Dame, Indiana, U.S. Stanford Stadium; Stanford, California, U.S.
- Trophy: None (1925–1988); Legends Trophy (1989–present)

Statistics
- Total meetings: 40
- All-time series: Notre Dame leads, 25–14 (.622)
- Trophy series: Notre Dame leads, 22–13 (.618)
- Largest victory: Notre Dame, 58–7 (2026)
- Longest win streak: Notre Dame, 7 (2002–2008)
- Current win streak: Notre Dame, 4 (2023–present)

Locations of Notre Dame and Stanford

The Notre Dame–Stanford football rivalry is an American college football rivalry between the Notre Dame Fighting Irish football team of the University of Notre Dame and Stanford Cardinal football team of Stanford University. As of 2026, the Notre Dame Fighting Irish and Stanford Cardinal have met 40 times, beginning in 1925 (though the modern series began in 1988). The Notre Dame–Stanford game has been played annually since 1997, with the teams meeting at Notre Dame Stadium earlier in the season (late September to mid-October) in even-numbered years, and at Stanford Stadium on the weekend following Thanksgiving in odd-numbered years since 1999. The game typically alternates positions in Notre Dame's schedule with its other former Pac-12 opponent, USC.

== Trophy ==
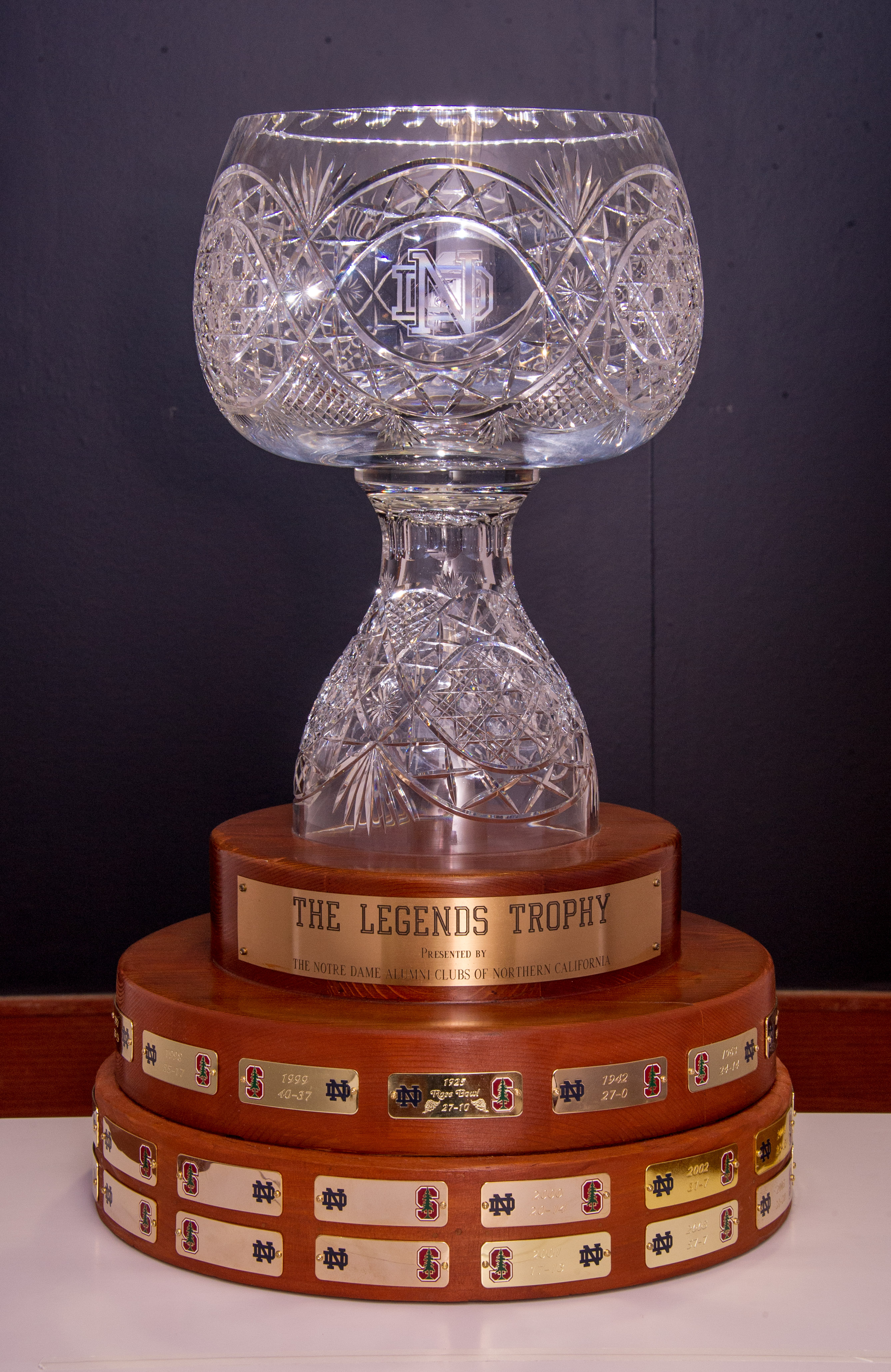
The Legends Trophy is awarded to the winner of the annual Notre Dame–Stanford football game, and currently resides with Notre Dame. The trophy was reconditioned in 2014 to allow for display of another 20+ future game score plates, and to honor the 90th anniversary of the first meeting of the two teams in the 1925 Rose Bowl.

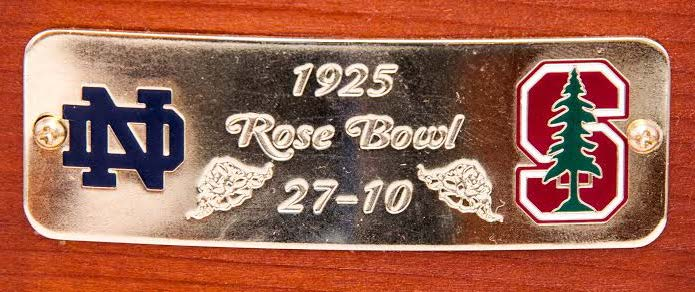
Close up of new game score plate for Notre Dame vs. Stanford 1925 Rose Bowl

The winner of the game gains the Legends Trophy, a Dublin Irish crystal bowl resting on a California redwood base. The trophy was presented for the first time in 1989 by the Notre Dame Club of the San Francisco Bay Area.

== Series history ==
The series began on January 1, 1925 (the end of the 1924 season) when Notre Dame's Four Horsemen and head coach Knute Rockne faced Stanford's Ernie Nevers and head coach Pop Warner at the 1925 Rose Bowl for the national championship. Notre Dame's 27–10 victory earned their first-ever national title and the first of four national titles to come via bowl victories.

After the two teams' first meeting at the 1925 Rose Bowl, they did not play each other again until 1942 and then in 1963 and 1964; those four games were the only games before the modern series began. Notre Dame and Stanford have played the modern series annually since 1988 (except in 1995, 1996, and 2020 as part of the Pac-12 Conference's decision to cancel all non-conference games because of the COVID-19 pandemic). The series is renewed through at least the 2028 season.

== Game results ==
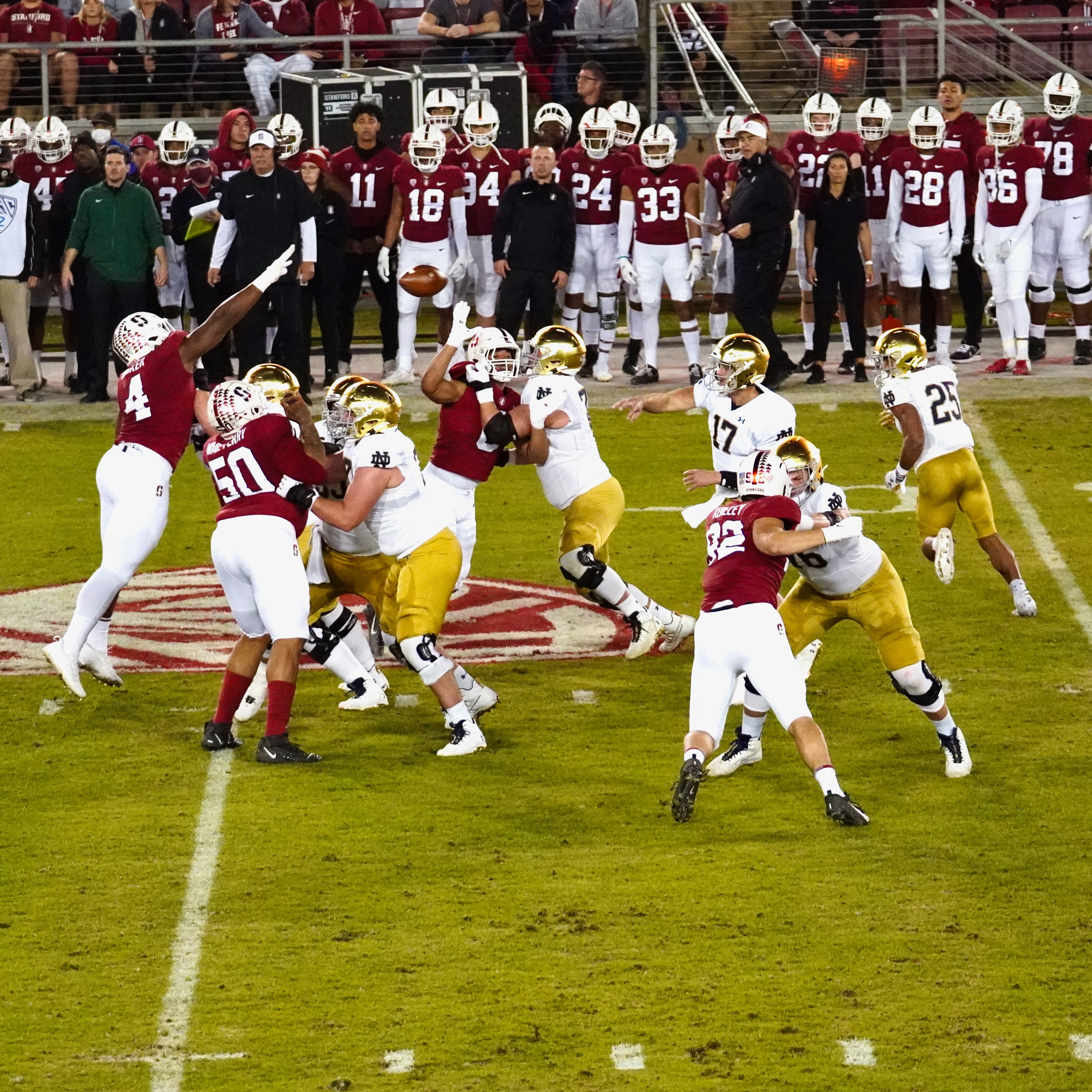
Notre Dame vs Stanford in 2021

As of 2024, Notre Dame leads the series 24–14, though the Cardinal lead 8–6 in the last fourteen games (8–7 if Notre Dame's vacated 2012 victory is included). The Fighting Irish hold the longest win-streak in the series, with seven wins from 2002 to 2008. The Cardinal's longest win streak were a pair of 3-win streaks from 2009 to 2011 and from 2015 to 2017. The back-to-back wins in 2009 and 2010 were the school's first consecutive victories in the series. Notre Dame is 13–5 at home (14–5 if Notre Dame's vacated 2012 victory is included) while the series is tied 9–9 at Stanford. Notre Dame won the only game played at a neutral site at the 1925 Rose Bowl.

Notre Dame victories	Stanford victories	Vacated wins (Note: Notre Dame's win in 2012 was vacated as a result of NCAA sanctions against the Notre Dame football program issued on November 22, 2016, after the NCAA found that a student-trainer committed academic misconduct for two football players and provided six other players with impermissible academic extra benefits. The NCAA also rejected Notre Dame's appeal on February 13, 2018. This win is not included in Notre Dame's all-time record, nor is it counted in the series record between the two teams. See Wikipedia:WikiProject College football/Vacated victories for an explanation of how vacated victories are recorded.)

No.	Date	Location	Winner	Score	Notes
1	January 1, 1925	Pasadena, CA	Notre Dame	27–10	
2	October 10, 1942	Notre Dame, IN	Notre Dame	27–0	(Note: The only shutout of the series)
3	October 26, 1963	Stanford, CA	Stanford	24–14	
4	October 24, 1964	Notre Dame, IN	#2 Notre Dame	28–6	
5	October 1, 1988	Notre Dame, IN	#5 Notre Dame	42–14	(Note: The first meeting of the modern series)
6	October 7, 1989	Stanford, CA	#1 Notre Dame	27–17	(Note: The start of a five-game streak in which the away team won)
7	October 6, 1990	Notre Dame, IN	Stanford	36–31	(Note: Stanford's first win in the modern series)
8	October 5, 1991	Stanford, CA	#8 Notre Dame	42–26	
9	October 3, 1992	Notre Dame, IN	#18 Stanford	33–16	(Note: First time both teams were ranked entering the game)
10	October 2, 1993	Stanford, CA	#4 Notre Dame	48–20	
11	October 1, 1994	Notre Dame, IN	#8 Notre Dame	34–15	(Note: The start of a seven-game streak in which the home team won)
12	October 4, 1997	Stanford, CA	#19 Stanford	33–15	
13	October 3, 1998	Notre Dame, IN	#23 Notre Dame	35–17	
14	November 27, 1999	Stanford, CA	Stanford	40–37	
15	October 7, 2000	Notre Dame, IN	#25 Notre Dame	20–14	
16	November 24, 2001	Stanford, CA	#13 Stanford	17–13	
17	October 5, 2002	Notre Dame, IN	#9 Notre Dame	31–7	(Note: The start of a seven-game winning streak for Notre Dame – the longest streak in series history)
18	November 29, 2003	Stanford, CA	Notre Dame	57–7	(Note: The first victory for an away team since 1993 The second largest margin of victory in any game of the series)
19	October 9, 2004	Notre Dame, IN	Notre Dame	23–15	
20	November 26, 2005	Stanford, CA	#6 Notre Dame	38–31	
21	October 7, 2006	Notre Dame, IN	#12 Notre Dame	31–10	

No.	Date	Location	Winner	Score	Notes
22	November 24, 2007	Stanford, CA	Notre Dame	21–14	
23	October 4, 2008	Notre Dame, IN	Notre Dame	28–21	
24	November 28, 2009	Stanford, CA	Stanford	45–38	(Note: Notre Dame fires coach Charlie Weis two days later)
25	September 25, 2010	Notre Dame, IN	#16 Stanford	37–14	(Note: Stanford's first win streak in the series The largest margin of victory for Stanford in the series Stanford's first win at Notre Dame since 1992)
26	November 26, 2011	Stanford, CA	#4 Stanford	28–14	(Note: Second time both teams were ranked entering the game)
27	October 13, 2012	Notre Dame, IN	#7 Notre Dame ^{†}	20–13^{OT}	(Note: Second straight time (and third time ever) both teams were ranked entering the game. Notre Dame forced overtime on a field goal with 20 seconds left after their drive was extended by Tyler Eifert drawing a pass-interference call on Terrence Brown. In OT, Irish quarterback Tommy Rees, replacing an injured Everett Golson, connected with T. J. Jones for a touchdown. Stanford had a chance to tie to force a second overtime, but after four straight runs by Stanford RB Stepfan Taylor, his final effort was ruled short of the goal line. The last play was reviewed and upheld, though the ruling met with controversy after the game.)
28	November 30, 2013	Stanford, CA	#8 Stanford	27–20	(Note: Third straight time (and fourth time ever) both teams were ranked entering the game)
29	October 4, 2014	Notre Dame, IN	#9 Notre Dame	17–14	(Note: Fourth straight time (and fifth time ever) both teams were ranked entering the game. Third straight game decided by one score or less.)
30	November 28, 2015	Stanford, CA	#13 Stanford	38–36	(Note: Fifth straight time (and sixth time ever) both teams were ranked entering the game.)
31	October 15, 2016	Notre Dame, IN	Stanford	17–10	
32	November 25, 2017	Stanford, CA	#20 Stanford	38–20	(Note: Seventh time both teams were ranked entering the game.)
33	September 29, 2018	Notre Dame, IN	#8 Notre Dame	38–17	(Note: Eighth time both teams were ranked entering the game, but first time both were ranked in the top 10 entering the game.)
34	November 30, 2019	Stanford, CA	#16 Notre Dame	45–24	(Note: Notre Dame's first win at Stanford since 2007)
35	November 27, 2021	Stanford, CA	#6 Notre Dame	45–14	
36	October 15, 2022	Notre Dame, IN	Stanford	16–14	
37	November 25, 2023	Stanford, CA	#18 Notre Dame	56–23	
38	October 12, 2024	Notre Dame, IN	#11 Notre Dame	49–7	
39	November 29, 2025	Stanford, CA	#9 Notre Dame	49–20	
40	October 10, 2026	Notre Dame, IN	#3 Notre Dame	58–7	
Series: Notre Dame leads 25–14
† Vacated by Notre Dame; Rankings from AP Poll

== See also ==
- List of NCAA college football rivalry games
