= 1924 California Golden Bears football team =

American college football season

1924 California Golden Bears football

PCC co-champion
- Conference: Pacific Coast Conference
- Record: 8–0–2 (2–0–2 PCC)
- Head coach: Andy Smith (9th season)
- Offensive scheme: Short-punt
- Captain: Edwin C. Horrell
- Home stadium: California Memorial Stadium

Uniform
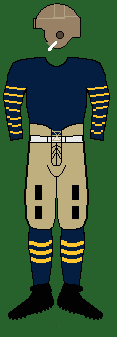

1924 Pacific Coast Conference football standings
	Conf.					Overall
Team	W		L		T	W		L		T
No. 5 Stanford ^ +	3	–	0	–	1	7	–	1	–	1
No. 2 California +	2	–	0	–	2	8	–	0	–	2
Washington	3	–	1	–	1	8	–	1	–	1
No. 7 USC	2	–	1	–	0	9	–	2	–	0
Idaho	4	–	2	–	0	5	–	2	–	1
Oregon	2	–	2	–	1	4	–	2	–	3
Oregon Agricultural	1	–	4	–	0	3	–	5	–	0
Washington State	0	–	4	–	1	1	–	5	–	2
Montana	0	–	3	–	0	4	–	4	–	0
+ – Conference co-champions; ^ – Selected as Rose Bowl representative; Rankings from Dickinson System

The 1924 California Golden Bears football team was an American football team that represented the University of California, Berkeley in the Pacific Coast Conference (PCC) during the 1924 college football season. In their ninth year under head coach Andy Smith, the team compiled an 8–0–2 record (2–0–2 against PCC opponents), finished as PCC co-champions with Stanford, and outscored its opponents by a combined total of 162 to 51.

== Schedule ==
Date	Opponent	Site	Result	Attendance	Source
September 27	Santa Clara*	California Memorial Stadium; Berkeley, CA	W 13–7	18,000	
October 4	Saint Mary's*	California Memorial Stadium; Berkeley, CA	W 17–7		
October 11	Pomona*	California Memorial Stadium; Berkeley, CA	W 28–0	30,000	
October 18	Olympic Club*	California Memorial Stadium; Berkeley, CA	W 9–3		
October 25	Washington State	California Memorial Stadium; Berkeley, CA	W 20–7	35,000	
November 1	USC	California Memorial Stadium; Berkeley, CA	W 7–0	60,000	
November 8	at Washington	Husky Stadium; Seattle, WA	T 7–7	35,000	
November 15	Nevada	California Memorial Stadium; Berkeley, CA	W 27–0		
November 22	Stanford	California Memorial Stadium; Berkeley, CA (Big Game)	T 20–20	98,000	
January 1, 1925	Penn*	California Memorial Stadium; Berkeley, CA	W 14–0	60,000	
*Non-conference game; Source:
