= 1924 Idaho Vandals football team =

American college football season

1924 Idaho Vandals football

Northwest Conference champion
- Conference: Northwest Conference, Pacific Coast Conference
- Record: 5–2–1 (4–0–1 Northwest, 4–2 PCC)
- Head coach: Robert L. Mathews (3rd season)
- Home stadium: MacLean Field

1924 Northwest Conference football standings
	Conf.					Overall
Team	W		L		T	W		L		T
Idaho +	4	–	0	–	1	5	–	2	–	1
Gonzaga +	3	–	0	–	2	5	–	0	–	2
Washington	5	–	1	–	0	8	–	1	–	1
Oregon	4	–	1	–	2	4	–	2	–	3
Oregon Agricultural	2	–	3	–	0	3	–	5	–	0
Montana	2	–	3	–	0	4	–	4	–	0
Pacific (OR)	1	–	3	–	0	3	–	4	–	0
Washington State	1	–	4	–	2	2	–	4	–	1
Whitman	1	–	5	–	0	1	–	5	–	0
Willamette	0	–	3	–	1	1	–	5	–	1
+ – Conference co-champions

1924 Pacific Coast Conference football standings
	Conf.					Overall
Team	W		L		T	W		L		T
No. 5 Stanford ^ +	3	–	0	–	1	7	–	1	–	1
No. 2 California +	2	–	0	–	2	8	–	0	–	2
Washington	3	–	1	–	1	8	–	1	–	1
No. 7 USC	2	–	1	–	0	9	–	2	–	0
Idaho	4	–	2	–	0	5	–	2	–	1
Oregon	2	–	2	–	1	4	–	2	–	3
Oregon Agricultural	1	–	4	–	0	3	–	5	–	0
Washington State	0	–	4	–	1	1	–	5	–	2
Montana	0	–	3	–	0	4	–	4	–	0
+ – Conference co-champions; ^ – Selected as Rose Bowl representative; Rankings from Dickinson System

The 1924 Idaho Vandals football team represented the University of Idaho as a member of the Northwest Conference and the Pacific Coast Conference (PCC) during the 1924 college football season. Led by third-year head coach Robert L. Mathews, the Vandals compiled an overall record of 5–2–1. Idaho had a record of 4–0–1 in Northwest Conference play, sharing the conference title with Gonzaga, and 4–2 against PCC opponents, tying for fourth place. The team played home games on campus, at MacLean Field in Moscow, Idaho.

The Vandals lost 3-0 to the eventual PCC champion, Stanford, at Multnomah Field in Portland, Oregon. Idaho defeated neighbor Washington State again in the Battle of the Palouse, the second of three consecutive wins over the Cougars in the rivalry. According to newspaper reports at the time, Idaho outplayed Stanford and Stanford was lucky to win. Idaho failed to score on 3 different possessions where they got the ball inside the Stanford 5 yard line, including one possession where they got the ball to the Stanford one foot line. If Idaho had won vs Stanford, then Idaho would have won the PCC championship and gone to the Rose Bowl vs Notre Dame, which may have permanently affected the trajectory of Idaho football to this very day. Instead, Idaho struggled for the remainder of its time in the PCC and struggled even more after a PCC rule in 1935 placed new restrictions on Idaho and Montana. Idaho was left out of the new conference when the PCC became the Pac-8 in the 1960s and eventually fell well behind Boise State in the 21st century. By 2016, Idaho was forced to downgrade to FCS after being kicked out of the Sun Belt and being unable to find another FBS conference.

The four PCC wins were the most ever for Idaho; their next best total was two, achieved six times, last in 1938.

== Schedule ==
Date	Opponent	Site	Result	Attendance	Source
October 4	at Gonzaga	Gonzaga Stadium; Spokane, WA	T 0–0	6,000	
October 11	at Montana	Dornblaser Field; Missoula, MT (rivalry)	W 41–13		
October 17	Washington State^{†}	MacLean Field; Moscow, ID (Battle of the Palouse)	W 19–3	10,000	
October 25	vs. Stanford	Multnomah Field; Portland, OR	L 0–3		
October 31	at Oregon Agricultural	Bell Field; Corvallis, OR	W 22–0	12,000	
November 8	Oregon	MacLean Field; Moscow, ID	W 13–0		
November 22	at USC	Los Angeles Memorial Coliseum; Los Angeles, CA	L 0–13	45,000	
November 27	vs. Nevada*	Public School Field; Boise, ID	W 23–0		
*Non-conference game; ^{†}Homecoming
