= 1924 Whitman Fighting Missionaries football team =

American college football season

1924 Whitman Fighting Missionaries football
- Conference: Northwest Conference
- Record: 1–5 (1–5 Northwest)
- Head coach: Vincent Borleske (9th season)
- Home stadium: Ankeny Field

1924 Northwest Conference football standings
	Conf.					Overall
Team	W		L		T	W		L		T
Idaho +	4	–	0	–	1	5	–	2	–	1
Gonzaga +	3	–	0	–	2	5	–	0	–	2
Washington	5	–	1	–	0	8	–	1	–	1
Oregon	4	–	1	–	2	4	–	2	–	3
Oregon Agricultural	2	–	3	–	0	3	–	5	–	0
Montana	2	–	3	–	0	4	–	4	–	0
Pacific (OR)	1	–	3	–	0	3	–	4	–	0
Washington State	1	–	4	–	2	2	–	4	–	1
Whitman	1	–	5	–	0	1	–	5	–	0
Willamette	0	–	3	–	1	1	–	5	–	1
+ – Conference co-champions

The 1924 Whitman Fighting Missionaries football team represented Whitman College as a member of the Northwest Conference during the 1924 college football season. Under ninth-year head coach Vincent Borleske, the Fighting Missionaries compiled an overall record of 1–5 with a mark of 1–5 in conference play, and finished ninth in the Northwest Conference.

== Schedule ==
Date	Opponent	Site	Result	Attendance	Source
October 3	vs. Oregon Agricultural	Round-Up Park; Pendleton, OR	L 0–41		
October 11	at Washington	University of Washington Stadium; Seattle, WA	L 0–55	6,394	
October 25	at Oregon	Hayward Field; Eugene, OR	L 6–40		
November 8	Willamette	Ankeny Field; Walla Walla, WA	W 7–6		
November 15	at Gonzaga	Gonzaga Stadium; Spokane, WA	L 0–63		
November 22	Montana	Ankeny Field; Walla Walla, WA	L 0–20		
