= 1924 USC Trojans football team =

American college football season

1924 USC Trojans football

Los Angeles Christmas Festival, W 20–7 vs. Missouri
- Conference: Pacific Coast Conference
- Record: 9–2 (2–1 PCC)
- Head coach: Gus Henderson (6th season)
- Captain: John Hawkins
- Home stadium: Los Angeles Memorial Coliseum

1924 Pacific Coast Conference football standings
	Conf.					Overall
Team	W		L		T	W		L		T
No. 5 Stanford ^ +	3	–	0	–	1	7	–	1	–	1
No. 2 California +	2	–	0	–	2	8	–	0	–	2
Washington	3	–	1	–	1	8	–	1	–	1
No. 7 USC	2	–	1	–	0	9	–	2	–	0
Idaho	4	–	2	–	0	5	–	2	–	1
Oregon	2	–	2	–	1	4	–	2	–	3
Oregon Agricultural	1	–	4	–	0	3	–	5	–	0
Washington State	0	–	4	–	1	1	–	5	–	2
Montana	0	–	3	–	0	4	–	4	–	0
+ – Conference co-champions; ^ – Selected as Rose Bowl representative; Rankings from Dickinson System

The 1924 USC Trojans football team represented the University of Southern California (USC) in the 1924 college football season. In their sixth and final year under head coach Gus Henderson, the Trojans compiled a 9–2 record (2–1 against conference opponents), tied for fourth place in the Pacific Coast Conference, and out-scored their opponents by a combined total of 269 to 44.

== Schedule ==
Date	Opponent	Site	Result	Attendance	Source
September 27	Caltech*	Los Angeles Memorial Coliseum; Los Angeles, CA	W 78–6	12,000	
October 4	Pomona*	Los Angeles Memorial Coliseum; Los Angeles, CA	W 14–0	20,000	
October 11	Arizona*	Los Angeles Memorial Coliseum; Los Angeles, CA	W 29–0	18,000	
October 18	vs. Oregon Agricultural	Multnomah Field; Portland, OR	W 17–3	15,000	
October 25	Nevada*	Los Angeles Memorial Coliseum; Los Angeles, CA	W 21–7	20,000	
November 1	at California	California Memorial Stadium; Berkeley, CA	L 0–7	60,000	
November 8	Saint Mary's*	Los Angeles Memorial Coliseum; Los Angeles, CA	L 10–14	35,000	
November 15	Whittier*	Los Angeles Memorial Coliseum; Los Angeles, CA	W 51–0	15,000	
November 22	Idaho	Los Angeles Memorial Coliseum; Los Angeles, CA	W 13–0	45,000	
December 6	Syracuse*^{†}	Los Angeles Memorial Coliseum; Los Angeles, CA	W 16–0	45,000	
December 25	Missouri*	Los Angeles Memorial Coliseum; Los Angeles, CA (Christmas Festival)	W 20–7	47,000	
*Non-conference game; ^{†}Homecoming
