= 1924 Washington Huskies football team =

American college football season

1924 Washington Huskies football
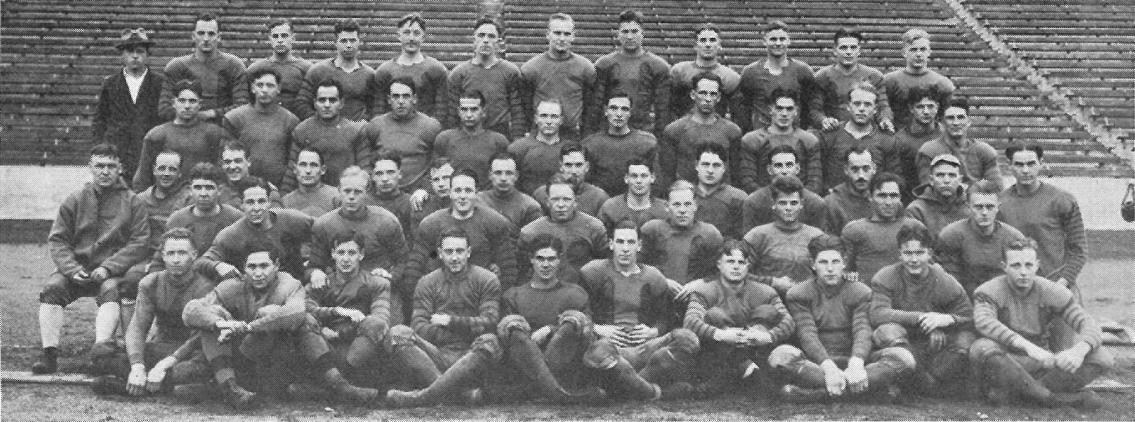
- Conference: Northwest Conference, Pacific Coast Conference
- Record: 8–1–1 (5–1 Northwest, 3–1–1 PCC)
- Head coach: Enoch Bagshaw (4th season)
- Captain: Edwin Kuhn
- Home stadium: University of Washington Stadium

1924 Northwest Conference football standings
| | Conf. | | | | | Overall |
| Team | W | | L | | T | W | | L | | T |
|---|---|---|---|---|---|---|---|---|---|---|
| Idaho + | 4 | – | 0 | – | 1 | 5 | – | 2 | – | 1 |
| Gonzaga + | 3 | – | 0 | – | 2 | 5 | – | 0 | – | 2 |
| Washington | 5 | – | 1 | – | 0 | 8 | – | 1 | – | 1 |
| Oregon | 4 | – | 1 | – | 2 | 4 | – | 2 | – | 3 |
| Oregon Agricultural | 2 | – | 3 | – | 0 | 3 | – | 5 | – | 0 |
| Montana | 2 | – | 3 | – | 0 | 4 | – | 4 | – | 0 |
| Pacific (OR) | 1 | – | 3 | – | 0 | 3 | – | 4 | – | 0 |
| Washington State | 1 | – | 4 | – | 2 | 2 | – | 4 | – | 1 |
| Whitman | 1 | – | 5 | – | 0 | 1 | – | 5 | – | 0 |
| Willamette | 0 | – | 3 | – | 1 | 1 | – | 5 | – | 1 |
+ – Conference co-champions

1924 Pacific Coast Conference football standings
| | Conf. | | | | | Overall |
| Team | W | | L | | T | W | | L | | T |
|---|---|---|---|---|---|---|---|---|---|---|
| No. 5 Stanford ^ + | 3 | – | 0 | – | 1 | 7 | – | 1 | – | 1 |
| No. 2 California + | 2 | – | 0 | – | 2 | 8 | – | 0 | – | 2 |
| Washington | 3 | – | 1 | – | 1 | 8 | – | 1 | – | 1 |
| No. 7 USC | 2 | – | 1 | – | 0 | 9 | – | 2 | – | 0 |
| Idaho | 4 | – | 2 | – | 0 | 5 | – | 2 | – | 1 |
| Oregon | 2 | – | 2 | – | 1 | 4 | – | 2 | – | 3 |
| Oregon Agricultural | 1 | – | 4 | – | 0 | 3 | – | 5 | – | 0 |
| Washington State | 0 | – | 4 | – | 1 | 1 | – | 5 | – | 2 |
| Montana | 0 | – | 3 | – | 0 | 4 | – | 4 | – | 0 |
+ – Conference co-champions; ^ – Selected as Rose Bowl representative; Rankings from Dickinson System

The 1924 Washington Huskies football team represented the University of Washington as a member of the Northwest Conference and the Pacific Coast Conference (PCC) during the 1924 college football season. In their fourth season under head coach Enoch Bagshaw, the Huskies compiled an overall record of 8–1–1, outscored opponents by a combined total of 355 to 24, and led the nation in scoring Washington had a record of 5–1 in Northwest Conference play and 3–1–1 against PCC opponents, placing third in both conferences. Edwin Kuhn was the team captain. Other notable players included halfback Wildcat Wilson and fullback Elmer Tesreau.

== Schedule ==
| Date | Opponent | Site | Result | Attendance | Source |
|---|---|---|---|---|---|
| September 27 | West Seattle Athletic Club* | University of Washington Stadium; Seattle, WA | W 32–0 | 4,526 | |
| September 27 | USS Maryland* | University of Washington Stadium; Seattle, WA | W 33–0 | 4,526 | |
| October 4 | Willamette | University of Washington Stadium; Seattle, WA | W 57–0 | 5,861 | |
| October 11 | Whitman | University of Washington Stadium; Seattle, WA | W 55–0 | 6,394 | |
| October 18 | Montana | University of Washington Stadium; Seattle, WA | W 52–7 | 9,419 | |
| October 25 | Oregon Agricultural | University of Washington Stadium; Seattle, WA | W 6–3 | 10,264 | |
| November 1 | at Oregon | Hayward Field; Eugene, OR (rivalry) | L 3–7 | 3,000 | |
| November 8 | California | University of Washington Stadium; Seattle, WA | T 7–7 | 35,000 | |
| November 15 | at Puget Sound* | Tacoma Stadium; Tacoma, WA | W 96–0 | 7,000 | |
| November 22 | Washington State | University of Washington Stadium; Seattle, WA (rivalry) | W 14–0 | 8,978 | |
*Non-conference game

== Game summaries ==
=== West Seattle Athletic Club ===
On September 28, two weeks after the first practice, the Huskies played their first two games of the 1924 season on the same day. According to local sports reporter, Royal Brougham, they "won both departments of its twin-bill handily, but by no means impressively." The first game of the day was against the West Seattle Athletic Club (West Seattle A.C.). Coach Bagshaw started his first string in this game and defeated West Seattle A.C. by a score of 32-0. George Guttormsen only played half of the game but led the scorers with two touchdowns. Elmer Tesreau and George Wilson also scored touchdowns.

The scoring opened at the end of the first quarter when Mike Hanley drop-kicked a field goal from the 30-yard line. The second quarter yielded all of the four touchdowns in the game. The first was a touchdown pass from halfback Hanley to the quarterback Guttormsen. Hanley kicked the extra point, or "try-for-point goal" in the terminology of the era. Next, came a rushing touchdown by Tesreau that was set up by a 30-yard pass from Hanley to Wilson. The extra point was not successful due to an off-side penalty. The third touchdown came on a 30-yard run off the right tackle by Guttormsen. The extra point was blocked. The last touchdown came just before half time on a run by Wilson. Guttormsen added the extra point. The final points of the game came on a place-kick field goal in the 3rd quarter by Douglas Kirk who had substituted for Guttormsen.

West Seattle Athletic Club at Washington

| Team | 1 | 2 | 3 | 4 | Total |
|---|---|---|---|---|---|
| West Seattle A.C. | 0 | 0 | 0 | 0 | 0 |
| • Washington | 3 | 26 | 3 | 0 | 32 |

- Date: September 27
- Location: Washington Stadium, Seattle, WA
- Game start: 1:30 pm PDT
- Referee: Ken Bartlett

Washington scoring: touchdowns by Guttormsen (2), Wilson, and Tesreau; field goals by Hanley and Kirk; extra points by Hanley and Guttormsen.

The Washington starters were Roy Seivers (left end), Ed Kuhn (left tackle), Ed McRae (left guard), Chalmers Walters (center), Vern Bellman (right guard), Harold Erickson (right tackle), Jud Cutting (right end), George Guttormsen (quarterback), George Wilson (left halfback), Mike Hanley (right halfback), Elmer Tesreau (fullback).

The West Seattle starters were Osterman (left end), R. Corbett (left tackle), King (left guard), Johnson (center), Cole (right guard), Paar (right tackle), Logan (right end), Jones (quarterback), Oliver (left halfback), B. Corbett (right halfback), Norris (fullback).

This was the first of three times that the University of Washington played football against West Seattle A.C. The Huskies won all three match ups.

=== USS Maryland ===
The second game played on September 28 was against the football team from the battleship USS Maryland. The "Fighting Mary" was based out of San Pedro, California.

Because this second game did not start until 3:30 p.m. it was agreed to shorten the quarters. Coach Bagshaw used reserves in this game as the starters had played in the earlier game. Becket threw passes for two touchdowns in the first quarter. The first touchdown came from a shoestring catch by Douglas on a 20-yard pass. The second touchdown was a pass to Lang. Shidler added a field goal and a rushing touchdown in the second quarter, and another rushing touchdown was made by Becket to close out the first half. One final touchdown was added by Shaw in quarter three to make the final score 33-0. All five of the extra point attempts following the touchdowns failed.

USS Maryland at Washington

| Team | 1 | 2 | 3 | 4 | Total |
|---|---|---|---|---|---|
| USS Maryland | 0 | 0 | 0 | 0 | 0 |
| • Washington | 12 | 15 | 6 | 0 | 33 |

- Date: September 27
- Location: Washington Stadium, Seattle, WA
- Game start: 3:30 pm PDT
- Referee: Bob Morris

Washington scoring: touchdowns, Douglas, Lang, H. Becket, Shaw (substituted at full back); field goals, Shidler; no extra points were scored.

The Washington starters were Beck (left end), Bill Petrie (left tackle), Egbert Brix (left guard), Ray Rice (center), Etherington (right guard), Abe Wilson (right tackle), Don Douglas (right end), Douglas Kirk (quarterback), Hugh Becket (left halfback), Harold Shidler (right halfback), Lang (fullback).

The USS Maryland starters were Goodall (left end), Kutesfar (left tackle), Dumphy (left guard), Miller (center), Cardini (right guard), Elich (right tackle), Berrier (right end), Timmons (quarterback), Young (left halfback), McGillicuddy (right halfback), Loiselle (fullback).

This was the only time that the University of Washington played the USS Maryland. However, they have played 14 games against teams from U.S. Navy ships and post a record of 13-1-0.

The game summaries below, including the headings in italic, are taken, word-for-word from the Football section of the 1925 Tyee year book.

=== Willamette ===
Willamette Game a Walkaway

"Displaying the power and machine-like precision that has been lacking in many a Husky team, Washington sent the Willamette Bearcats home on the short end of a 57 to 0 score on the following Saturday.

Mike Hanley scintillated in the game, dazzling the boys with his ball toting tactics. He passed and carried the ball brilliantly and finished up a perfect afternoon with a 35-yard drop kick.

The Bearcats' vaunted defense which had held Oregon to a scoreless tie on the previous Saturday failed to function, Washington making yardage almost at will."

=== Whitman ===
Whitman a Cinch

"On October 11, (Coach) Borleske brought his Whitman Wildcats to the Husky lair and saw them soundly trounced, 55 to 0.

Borleske put a light, fast, fighting team of veterans on the field but they were no match for the Husky juggernauts, Tesreau and Wilson."

=== Montana ===
Washington, 52; Montana, 7

"Washington completely overwhelmed the Montana Grizzlies on the following Saturday, winning 52 to 7, but a stocky little fellow by the good old Irish name of Kelly completely stole the show.

The sensational Bill Kelly made the Grizzlies lone touchdown on an 85-yard run through the entire Washington team, yodelled signals, did most of the tackling, carried the ball, ran back the punts and hurled passes.

The Husky backfield, despite the absence of Wilson, looked good. Guttormsen, Shidler, Hanley, Beckett, Tesreau and Parmeter carried the brunt of the attack."

=== Oregon State ===
O.A.C. Surprises

"Washington's first surprise came when the fighting Aggies from Corvallis displayed remarkable defensive strength under their own goal posts and were only beaten 6 to 3 on a muddy field.

O.A.C scored first on a place kick by Schulmerich in the first quarter. Wilson made the only touchdown in the game early in the second frame when he broke through the center of the Aggie's line and twisted and side-stepped his way 67 yards to the goal line.

The Huskies gained at will in midfield, but fumbles and penalties usually proved costly when near the goal line.

Washington fans were given their only view of the huddle system in the game."

=== Oregon ===
Oregon Disaster

Bagshaw prepared his team for its only road trip of the season expecting a win over Oregon, but the Huskies were defeated, ending their chances of winning the championship.

More than one thousand students watched a play-by-play account of the game, telegraphed to the Armory from Eugene. On the automatic scoreboard they saw how Jones, Oregon fullback, tore large gaps in the Husky line, saw the great Husky backs gain at will in mid-field only to run up against a stone wall when close to the goal line.

At Eugene the field was a virtual quagmire. Bad breaks, poor headwork and penalties cost Washington the tilt.

Wilson's punt from behind his own goal line struck the cross bar and rebounded over the line. Mautz, lanky Webfooter end, fell on the ball for what proved to be the winning score.

Injuries to Kuhn, McRae and Guttormsen, handicapped the team a great deal."

=== California ===
The California Game

"Despite the setback at Oregon's hands, the Purple Tornado came back with a zest the next Saturday and fought its way to tie, with the great Golden Bear team from Berkeley. Washington gained a 7 to 7 tie.

But only by looking at the score board could the fans see Washington's even showing against the Berkeley team. Using the same deceptive spin play which featured their attack on their last showing in the Stadium in 1922, the Bruins forced Washington throughout the entire game on November 8.

A Washington blunder gave its score when a partly blocked punt was recovered by California on the 30-yard line while the Huskies stood watching the ball roll. Had it not been for this lapse of memory Washington might have won that game. Jabs, Bear fullback, bucked the ball over on line plays, and Carlson converted the try-for-point.

Out-played but not out-fought and with but five minutes to go, California holding the ball, McRae recovered a Bruin fumble on the 30-yard line. Lillis was sent in for McRae and received a pass on the first play for a substantial gain. The same play which netted a touchdown in the famous Navy game. A short pass, Wilson to Guttormsen, netted more yardage. George Wilson then got away to a 27-yard run on a crisscross around the right end to the 12-yard line. Here the Bears held and on the fourth down with seven yards to go, Wilson tossed a well masked pass to the fleet footed Guttormsen who carried the ball over for a touchdown.

With one minute to go, and a chance to tie the score, Harold Shidler went in to convert the try-for-point. He did so to the satisfaction of thirty thousand howling fans.

Tut Imlay's open field running and Captain Horrell's line playing stood out for California.

Harold Patton, Wilson and Tesreau played great ball throughout the game.

California showed a superior set of wingmen, Guttormsen being downed in his track repeatedly."

The reference to the "famous Navy game" refers to a play in the second half of the 1924 Rose Bowl. This was a 12-yard touchdown pass from quarterback Fred Abel to left guard James Bryan where an unbalanced line made the guard an eligible receiver.

=== Puget Sound ===
Huge Score for Camp

"The next week, before the eyes of Walter Camp, football sage of New Haven, George Wilson led his team in a scoring orgy against the College of Puget Sound. The final score was 96 to 0, incidentally the largest score of the western grid season.

Coach Bagshaw used every man that had made the trip.

Camp liked the way Harold Shidler, Tesreau and Patton performed. Tesreau's defensive work stood out."

=== Washington State ===
Win Over Traditional Rivals

"George Wilson, Bagshaw's great All-American back was the spark plug of a driving attack that carried the Huskies to a 14 to 0 victory over their traditional rivals from Pullman in the final game of the season on November 22.

The highly touted Cougar offense failed to materialize against the Huskies. Koenig, Exendine's brilliant Eskimo halfback, gave the fans a thrill several times by his passing and ball running, putting his teammates in a position to score twice.

Wilson contributed largely toward Washington's first score when he crashed off right tackle 49 yards to the one yard mark. Tesreau carried it over and Guttormsen converted. Wilson, Tesreau and Patton bucked the ball for the length of the field for the final score.

Captain Kuhn, Bellman, Dubois, Westrom, Seivers and Walters, played remarkable ball in their final college game."
