= 1924 Gonzaga Bulldogs football team =

American college football season

1924 Gonzaga Bulldogs football

Northwest Conference co-champion
- Conference: Northwest Conference
- Record: 5–0–2 (3–0–2 Northwest)
- Head coach: Gus Dorais (5th season)
- Home stadium: Gonzaga Stadium

1924 Northwest Conference football standings
	Conf.					Overall
Team	W		L		T	W		L		T
Idaho +	4	–	0	–	1	5	–	2	–	1
Gonzaga +	3	–	0	–	2	5	–	0	–	2
Washington	5	–	1	–	0	8	–	1	–	1
Oregon	4	–	1	–	2	4	–	2	–	3
Oregon Agricultural	2	–	3	–	0	3	–	5	–	0
Montana	2	–	3	–	0	4	–	4	–	0
Pacific (OR)	1	–	3	–	0	3	–	4	–	0
Washington State	1	–	4	–	2	2	–	4	–	1
Whitman	1	–	5	–	0	1	–	5	–	0
Willamette	0	–	3	–	1	1	–	5	–	1
+ – Conference co-champions

The 1924 Gonzaga Bulldogs football team was an American football team that represented Gonzaga University as a member of the Northwest Conference during the 1924 college football season. In their fifth and final year under head coach Gus Dorais, the Bulldogs compiled an overall 5–0–2 record with a mark of 3–0–2 in conference play, sharing the Northwest Conference title with Idaho. Gonzaga shut out five of seven opponents, and outscored all opponents by a total of 138 to 26.

Four of the 11 starters on the 1924 Gonzaga team went on to play in the National Football League (NFL): left halfback Hust Stockton (1925–29); end Ray Flaherty (1926–1935); tackle Tiny Cahoon (1926–1929); and guard Hector Cyre (1926–1928). Dorais left Gonzaga after the 1924 season to become head football coach at the University of Detroit.

== Schedule ==
Date	Opponent	Site	Result	Attendance	Source
September 27	Cheney Normal*	Gonzaga Stadium; Spokane, WA	W 27–0		
October 4	Idaho	Gonzaga Stadium; Spokane, WA (rivalry)	T 0–0	6,000	
October 11	at Washington State	Rogers Field; Pullman, WA	W 14–12	8,000	
October 25	Multnomah Athletic Club*	Gonzaga Stadium; Spokane, WA	W 14–0		
November 1	at Montana	Dornblaser Field; Missoula, MT	W 20–14		
November 15	Whitman	Gonzaga Stadium; Spokane, WA	W 63–0		
November 27	Washington State	Gonzaga Stadium; Spokane, WA	T 0–0	8,000	
*Non-conference game; Source:
