= 1924 Montana Grizzlies football team =

American college football season

1924 Montana Grizzlies football
- Conference: Northwest Conference, Pacific Coast Conference
- Record: 4–4 (2–3 Northwest, 0–3 PCC)
- Head coach: Earl Clark (1st season)
- Home stadium: Dornblaser Field

1924 Northwest Conference football standings
	Conf.					Overall
Team	W		L		T	W		L		T
Idaho +	4	–	0	–	1	5	–	2	–	1
Gonzaga +	3	–	0	–	2	5	–	0	–	2
Washington	5	–	1	–	0	8	–	1	–	1
Oregon	4	–	1	–	2	4	–	2	–	3
Oregon Agricultural	2	–	3	–	0	3	–	5	–	0
Montana	2	–	3	–	0	4	–	4	–	0
Pacific (OR)	1	–	3	–	0	3	–	4	–	0
Washington State	1	–	4	–	2	2	–	4	–	1
Whitman	1	–	5	–	0	1	–	5	–	0
Willamette	0	–	3	–	1	1	–	5	–	1
+ – Conference co-champions

1924 Pacific Coast Conference football standings
	Conf.					Overall
Team	W		L		T	W		L		T
No. 5 Stanford ^ +	3	–	0	–	1	7	–	1	–	1
No. 2 California +	2	–	0	–	2	8	–	0	–	2
Washington	3	–	1	–	1	8	–	1	–	1
No. 7 USC	2	–	1	–	0	9	–	2	–	0
Idaho	4	–	2	–	0	5	–	2	–	1
Oregon	2	–	2	–	1	4	–	2	–	3
Oregon Agricultural	1	–	4	–	0	3	–	5	–	0
Washington State	0	–	4	–	1	1	–	5	–	2
Montana	0	–	3	–	0	4	–	4	–	0
+ – Conference co-champions; ^ – Selected as Rose Bowl representative; Rankings from Dickinson System

The 1924 Montana Grizzlies football team represented the University of Montana as a member of the Northwest Conference and the Pacific Coast Conference (PCC) during the 1924 college football season. Led by first-year head coach Earl Clark, the Grizzlies compiled an overall record of 4–4. Montana had a record of 2–3 in Northwest Conference play, tying for fifth place, and 0–3 against PCC opponents, tying for eighth place. The team played home games at Dornblaser Field in Missoula, Montana.

== Schedule ==
Date	Opponent	Site	Result	Source
October 4	Mount St. Charles*	Dornblaser Field; Missoula, MT	W 40–7	
October 11	Idaho	Dornblaser Field; Missoula, MT (rivalry)	L 13–41	
October 18	at Washington	Husky Stadium; Seattle, WA	L 7–52	
October 25	at Montana Mines*	Butte, MT	W 106–6	
November 1	Gonzaga	Dornblaser Field; Missoula, MT	L 14–20	
November 8	Pacific (OR)	Dornblaser Field; Missoula, MT	W 61–7	
November 15	at Stanford	Stanford Stadium; Stanford, CA	L 3–41	
November 22	at Whitman	Ankeny Field; Walla Walla, WA	W 20–0	
*Non-conference game
