= Los Angeles Christmas Festival =

1924 Los Angeles Christmas Festival
| USC Trojans | Missouri Tigers |
| (8–2) | (7–1) |
| 20 | 7 |
| Head coach: Gus Henderson | Head coach: Gwinn Henry |
| | 1 | 2 | 3 | 4 | Total |
|---|---|---|---|---|---|
| USC | 0 | 0 | 20 | 0 | 20 |
| Missouri | 0 | 0 | 0 | 7 | 7 |
- Date: December 25, 1924
- Season: 1924
- Stadium: Los Angeles Memorial Coliseum
- Location: Los Angeles, California

The Los Angeles Christmas Festival was a post-season college football bowl game played at the Los Angeles Memorial Coliseum in Los Angeles, California, on December 25, 1924, between the USC Trojans and the Missouri Tigers. It was the first and only Festival game ever played, in a time when bowl games were a fairly new concept. It was Missouri's first bowl appearance and USC's second, having last played in the 1923 Rose Bowl.

== Proposed revival ==
Proposed Christmas Bowl logo

A group led by Derek Dearwater looked to create a new Christmas Bowl in 2010. According to Dearwater, the game was supposed to pit the Pac-10's No. 7 team (or a school from the Mid-American Conference if the Pac-10 didn't have any more bowl-eligible squads) against the Western Athletic Conference's No. 2 team. The L.A. Coliseum was the planned venue, either on Christmas Eve or the following Monday, December 27. The Children's Miracle Network ("Creating Christmas Miracles for Children in Need") was to be the game's chief benefactor.

However, the bowl proposal "fell short of meeting the NCAA's licensing criteria due to an inability to secure a back-up conference agreement" for the Pac-10's No. 7 selection. The game applied to the NCAA for certification in 2011 and again in 2014, unsuccessfully.

In 2019, the Los Angeles Bowl was announced, with the game to be played at the new SoFi Stadium.

== See also ==
- List of college bowl games
