= 1924 Oregon Agricultural Aggies football team =

American college football season

1924 Oregon Agricultural Beavers football
- Conference: Northwest Conference, Pacific Coast Conference
- Record: 3–5 (2–3 Northwest, 1–4 PCC)
- Head coach: Paul J. Schissler (1st season)
- Captain: Herb Rich
- Home stadium: Bell Field

1924 Northwest Conference football standings
	Conf.					Overall
Team	W		L		T	W		L		T
Idaho +	4	–	0	–	1	5	–	2	–	1
Gonzaga +	3	–	0	–	2	5	–	0	–	2
Washington	5	–	1	–	0	8	–	1	–	1
Oregon	4	–	1	–	2	4	–	2	–	3
Oregon Agricultural	2	–	3	–	0	3	–	5	–	0
Montana	2	–	3	–	0	4	–	4	–	0
Pacific (OR)	1	–	3	–	0	3	–	4	–	0
Washington State	1	–	4	–	2	2	–	4	–	1
Whitman	1	–	5	–	0	1	–	5	–	0
Willamette	0	–	3	–	1	1	–	5	–	1
+ – Conference co-champions

1924 Pacific Coast Conference football standings
	Conf.					Overall
Team	W		L		T	W		L		T
No. 5 Stanford ^ +	3	–	0	–	1	7	–	1	–	1
No. 2 California +	2	–	0	–	2	8	–	0	–	2
Washington	3	–	1	–	1	8	–	1	–	1
No. 7 USC	2	–	1	–	0	9	–	2	–	0
Idaho	4	–	2	–	0	5	–	2	–	1
Oregon	2	–	2	–	1	4	–	2	–	3
Oregon Agricultural	1	–	4	–	0	3	–	5	–	0
Washington State	0	–	4	–	1	1	–	5	–	2
Montana	0	–	3	–	0	4	–	4	–	0
+ – Conference co-champions; ^ – Selected as Rose Bowl representative; Rankings from Dickinson System

The 1924 Oregon Agricultural Beavers football team represented Oregon Agricultural College (OAC)—now known as Oregon State University—as a member of the Northwest Conference and the Pacific Coast Conference (PCC) during the 1924 college football season. Under first-year head coach Paul J. Schissler, the Beavers compiled an overall record of 3–5 were outscored 85 to 71. Oregon Agricultural had a record of 2–3 in Northwest Conference play, tying for fifth place, and a record of 1–4 against PCC opponents, finishing seventh. Millard Scott was the team captain, and Percy Locey became the first Oregon Agricultural player to appear in an East–West Shrine Game. The team played its home games on campus at Bell Field in Corvallis, Oregon.

In the early months of 1924, the college considered applications from 90 candidates for the position of head football coach. Schissler, the head coach at Lombard College in Galesburg, Illinois, was hired on April 1. His Lombard Olive had lost only one game in three years (to Notre Dame) and outscored opponents 800 to 69; Schissler was recommended to Oregon Agricultural by Notre Dame head coach Knute Rockne.

== Schedule ==
Date	Opponent	Site	Result	Attendance	Source
October 3	vs. Whitman	Roundup Park; Pendelton, OR	W 41–0		
October 11	Multnomah Athletic Club*	Bell Field; Corvallis, OR	W 7–6		
October 18	vs. USC	Multnomah Field; Portland, OR	L 3–17	15,000	
October 25	at Washington	Husky Stadium; Seattle, WA	L 3–6	10,264	
October 31	Idaho	Bell Field; Corvallis, OR	L 0–22	12,000	
November 7	at Washington State	Rogers Field; Pullman, WA	W 14–13		
November 22	Oregon^{†}	Bell Field; Corvallis, OR (rivalry)	L 3–7		
November 27	at Nebraska*	Memorial Stadium; Lincoln, NE	L 0–14		
*Non-conference game; ^{†}Homecoming; Source:

== Game summaries ==
=== October 3: at Whitman College in Pendleton ===
OAC opened its 1924 schedule with a tune-up game against Whitman College of Walla Walla, Washington, a small liberal arts college which had maintained a football program since the 1890s and which had first played the Aggies in 1908. Enrollment at OAC and its player pool had grown considerably during the 1910s and these peers of the early 1900s were no longer evenly matched. Thirty Aggie players would see action against Whitman — a remarkable number for the single platoon era — and these were said to outweigh their opponents in the maize-and-blue by an average of 15 pounds and to exhibit more speed as well.

The game started even, with OAC receiving the opening kick and driving the ball to the 20-yard line, where they were held to a field goal. This 3–0 Aggie lead would remain all the scoring of a relatively uneventful first quarter.

The Beavers pushed the ball across the goal line early in the second quarter, with the conversion making the score 10–0, and OAC coach Schissler immediately substituted an entire 11-man team. This second unit used forward passes with effect, soon scoring a second touchdown, and the rout was on. A third touchdown was scored on a 45-yard run by Aggie quarterback Ray Price and then OAC scored yet again, taking a 34–0 lead into halftime.

The OAC second unit started the second half, and Coach Schissler ran in a steady stream of reserves throughout the rest of the game. "The substitutes seemed to be almost on a par with the varsity although they made but one touchdown during the final quarter," a reporter from the Whitman campus newspaper observed. According to this observer, the Beavers were assessed "close to 200 yards" in penalties, frequently the result of "inaccurate timing of shift plays." He added that "just as much was for holding and unnecessary roughness," which was sometimes caught but still the Beavers "got away with plenty." The 41–0 result was one-sided, but could have been much worse.
