= 1924 college football season =

American college football season

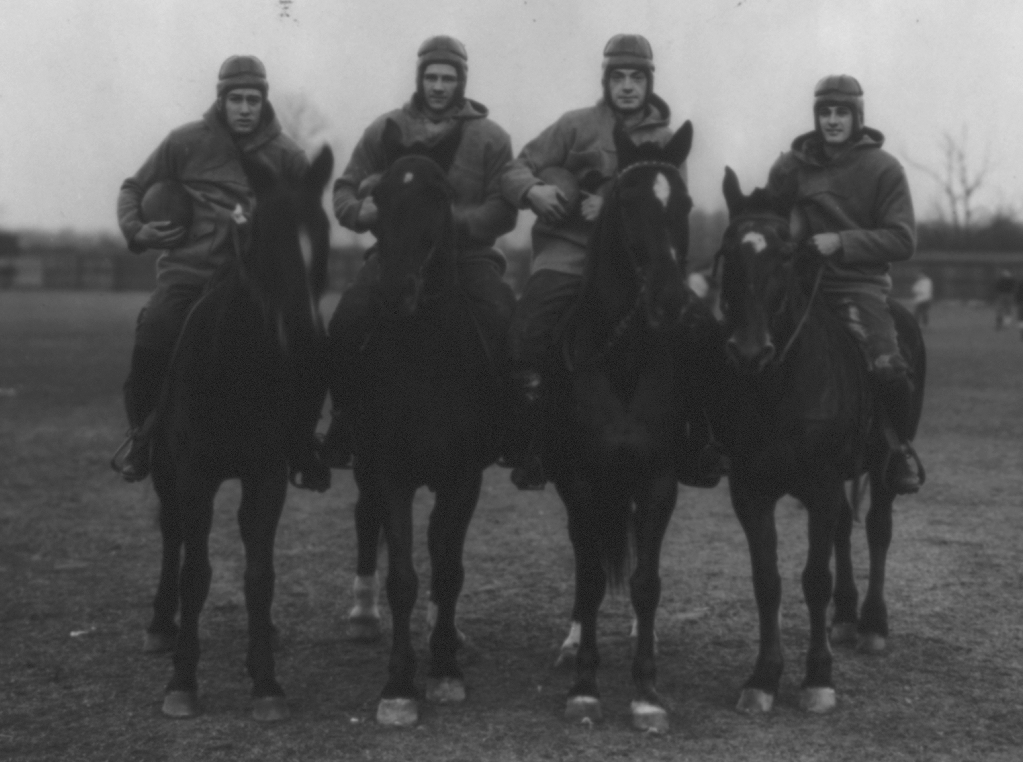
- Notre Dame's "Four Horsemen"
- Number of bowls: 3
- Bowl games: January 1, 1925
- Champion(s): Notre Dame; Pennsylvania

The 1924 college football season was the year of the Four Horsemen as the Notre Dame team, coached by Knute Rockne, won all of its games, including the Rose Bowl, to be acclaimed as the best team in the nation. Notre Dame and Stanford were both unbeaten at season's end, with the Fighting Irish winning the Rose Bowl contest 27–10. The Penn Quakers were retroactively awarded a national championship by Parke H. Davis.

Red Grange's Illinois team upset Michigan. The Illini were upset by Minnesota, which in turn was upset by Vanderbilt. Fred Russell's Fifty Years of Vanderbilt Football dubs 1924 "the most eventful season in the history of Vanderbilt football." Centre claimed a southern title in its last season of national relevance, upsetting Wallace Wade's first SoCon champion Alabama team. Alabama did not lose another game until 1927.

== Conference and program changes ==
=== Conference changes ===
- Three new conferences began play in 1924:
  - Missouri Intercollegiate Athletic Association – active NCAA Division II conference now known as the Mid-America Intercollegiate Athletics Association
  - Texas Intercollegiate Athletic Association – conference active through the 1930 season
  - West Virginia Intercollegiate Athletic Conference – NAIA and NCAA Division II conference active through the 2013 season
- One conference played its final season in 1924:
  - California Coast Conference – originally established in 1922

=== Membership changes ===
School	1923 Conference	1924 Conference
Ball Teachers Hoosieroons	Program established	Indiana Intercollegiate
College of Charleston Cougars	Independent	Dropped Program
Georgia Normal Eagles	Program established	Independent
Montana Grizzlies	Independent	PCC
Sewanee Tigers	SIAA	Southern
Vanderbilt Commodores	SIAA/Southern	Southern
VMI Keydets	Independent	Southern

== September ==
September 27 California had a 13–7 win over Santa Clara. Dartmouth beat Norwich College 40–0. Southern Methodist University (SMU) beat North Texas 7–0, and Alabama opened with a 55–0 win over Union College of Tennessee.

== October ==
October 4 Missouri opened its season with a 3–0 win at Chicago, the Maroons' only loss of the season. Notre Dame opened its season with a 40–0 win over Lombard College. Stanford beat Occidental College 20–6, and California beat St. Mary's 17–7. Army beat St. Louis 17–0, Yale beat North Carolina 27–0, and Dartmouth beat Montreal's McGill University 52–0. Alabama won at Furman 20–0. SMU beat Trinity College 14–3

October 11 Notre Dame beat Wabash 34–0. Stanford beat the Olympic Club 7–0 and California defeated Pomona College, 28–0. Army beat Detroit's Mercy College, 20–0 and Dartmouth beat Vermont 38–0. In a battle of Bulldogs, Yale beat Georgia 7–6. Missouri defeated Missouri Wesleyan College 14–0 (MWC was closed in 1930). Chicago beat visiting Brown, 19–7. Alabama beat Mississippi College 51–0. In a Friday game, SMU beat Austin College 7–0

October 18 At the Polo Grounds in New York, Notre Dame beat Army 13–7, the Cadets' only loss for the season. In his column the next day, sportswriter Grantland Rice dubbed the Notre Dame backfield (Harry Stuhldreher, Don Miller, Jim Crowley, and Elmer Layden) in his column of October 20, writing "Outlined against a blue-gray October sky, the Four Horsemen rode again. In dramatic lore they are known as famine, pestilence, destruction and death. These are only aliases. Their real names are: Stuhldreher, Miller, Crowley and Layden. They formed the crest of the South Bend cyclone before which another fighting Army team was swept over the precipice at the Polo Grounds this afternoon as 55,000 spectators peered down upon the bewildering panorama spread out upon the green plain below."

In other games, Yale and Dartmouth played to a 14–14 tie. Stanford defeated Oregon 28–13, while California beat the Olympic Club 9–3. In Birmingham, Alabama beat Sewanee 14–0. SMU beat Texas 10–6. Missouri won at Iowa State 7–0, and Chicago defeated Indiana 23–0.

October 25 Notre Dame beat Princeton 12–0. In Columbus, Chicago and Ohio State played to a 3–3 tie. At Portland, Oregon, Stanford had a more difficult time than expected in defeating Idaho, 3–0, while California beat Washington State 20–7. Army beat Boston University 20–0, Dartmouth beat Harvard 6–0, and Yale defeated Brown 13–3. At Atlanta, Alabama recorded another shutout, beating Georgia Tech 14–0. SMU and Texas A & M played to a 7–7 tie in Dallas. Missouri beat Kansas State 14–7.

== November ==
November 1 California and USC, both unbeaten and untied with records of 5–0–0, met at Berkeley, with California handing the Trojans their first defeat, 7–0. Notre Dame beat visiting Georgia Tech 34–3 Stanford beat Santa Clara 20–0 and California beat visiting USC 7–0 Army and Yale played to a 7–7 tie. Dartmouth defeated Brown 10–3. SMU stayed unbeaten with a 6–0 win at TCU. Missouri suffered its first defeat, a 14–6 loss at Nebraska. Chicago beat Purdue 19–6.

Alabama registered its 8th shutout in a 61–0 win over Ole Miss at Montgomery. To that point, the Crimson Tide had outscored its opposition 215–0.

November 8 Notre Dame won at Wisconsin 38–3 In a game at Berkeley, Stanford beat Utah 30–0, while in Seattle, California was tied by Washington. Army beat visiting Florida 14–7, Dartmouth beat Boston University 38–0, and Yale beat Maryland 47–0 SMU was tied at Arkansas 14–14. Alabama gave up its first points in a 42–7 win over visiting Kentucky. Missouri won at Oklahoma 10–0. Chicago and Illinois played to a 21–21 tie.

November 15 Notre Dame beat Nebraska 34–6 Stanford beat Montana 41–3 and California beat Nevada 27–0 Army and Columbia played to a 14–14 tie, and Yale beat Princeton 10–0. In New York, Dartmouth closed its season unbeaten with a 27–14 win over Cornell. Alabama was defeated by Centre College, 17–0, in a game at Birmingham. SMU and Baylor played to a 7–7 tie in Dallas. Missouri beat Washington University in St. Louis 35–0. Chicago beat Northwestern 3–0.

November 22 In Chicago, Notre Dame beat Northwestern 13–6 Stanford (7–0–0) and California (7–0–1) were both unbeaten going into the final game of the season, played at Berkeley. The teams played to a 20–20 tie, with Stanford getting the bid to the Rose Bowl; California hosted a postseason game against Penn for New Year's Day Yale closed its season unbeaten with a 19–6 win over Harvard. Chicago and Wisconsin played to a scoreless tie.

On Thanksgiving Day, November 27 Alabama beat Georgia 33–0 in Birmingham. Missouri beat Kansas 14–0, and received an invitation to play USC at the Los Angeles Christmas Festival (where it would lose, 20–7)

Notre Dame closed its season in Pittsburgh on Friday, November 28, with a 40–19 win over Carnegie Tech. In the Army–Navy Game, held in Baltimore, Army won 12–0 On November 29 SMU and Oklahoma State played to a 13–13 tie, giving the Mustangs a season record of 5 wins, no losses and four ties.

== Rose Bowl ==
Notre Dame had the Four Horsemen; Stanford had Ernie Nevers. Neither team had lost a game in 1924 and they met in Pasadena before a crowd of 52,000. The Stanford Indians took a 3–0 lead in the first quarter after Murray Cuddeback's field goal. In the second quarter, Elmer Layden ran for one touchdown, then scored another after picking off an Ernie Nevers pass and returning the interception to give the Irish a 13–3 lead at halftime. Stanford closed the gap to 13–10 in the third quarter with a pass from Ed Walker to Ted Shipkey, but lineman Ed Hunsinger scooped up a fumble from an attempted Stanford punt return to give Notre Dame its third touchdown. In the last quarter, Stanford was stopped eight inches from the goal line. Layden picked off another Nevers pass and returned it 70 yards for the final score, with Notre Dame winning 27–10.

== Other bowls ==
- 1925 Dixie Classic
- Los Angeles Christmas Festival

== Conference standings ==
Rankings listed below under the Dickinson System were not made during the 1924 season, but retroactively on October 16, 1925 when Frank G. Dickinson ranked 11 teams according to his mathematical formula, with Notre Dame having the best score, followed by California, Yale, Illinois and Stanford in the top five teams.

=== Major conference standings ===
1924 Big Ten Conference football standings
	Conf.					Overall
Team	W		L		T	W		L		T
No. 11 Chicago $	3	–	0	–	3	4	–	1	–	3
No. 4 Illinois	3	–	1	–	1	6	–	1	–	1
No. 6 Iowa	3	–	1	–	1	6	–	1	–	1
Michigan	4	–	2	–	0	6	–	2	–	0
Purdue	2	–	2	–	0	5	–	2	–	0
Minnesota	1	–	2	–	1	3	–	3	–	2
Ohio State	1	–	3	–	2	2	–	3	–	3
Indiana	1	–	3	–	0	4	–	4	–	0
Northwestern	1	–	3	–	0	4	–	4	–	0
Wisconsin	0	–	2	–	2	2	–	3	–	3
$ – Conference champion; Rankings from Dickinson System

1924 Missouri Valley Conference football standings
	Conf.					Overall
Team	W		L		T	W		L		T
No. 10 Missouri $	5	–	1	–	0	7	–	2	–	0
Nebraska	3	–	1	–	0	5	–	3	–	0
Drake	3	–	1	–	1	5	–	2	–	1
Grinnell	2	–	1	–	0	3	–	3	–	0
Iowa State	3	–	2	–	0	4	–	3	–	1
Oklahoma	2	–	3	–	1	2	–	5	–	1
Kansas	2	–	4	–	1	2	–	5	–	1
Kansas State	1	–	4	–	1	3	–	4	–	1
Washington University	0	–	4	–	0	4	–	4	–	0
$ – Conference champion; Rankings from Dickinson System

1924 Northwest Conference football standings
	Conf.					Overall
Team	W		L		T	W		L		T
Idaho +	4	–	0	–	1	5	–	2	–	1
Gonzaga +	3	–	0	–	2	5	–	0	–	2
Washington	5	–	1	–	0	8	–	1	–	1
Oregon	4	–	1	–	2	4	–	2	–	3
Oregon Agricultural	2	–	3	–	0	3	–	5	–	0
Montana	2	–	3	–	0	4	–	4	–	0
Pacific (OR)	1	–	3	–	0	3	–	4	–	0
Washington State	1	–	4	–	2	2	–	4	–	1
Whitman	1	–	5	–	0	1	–	5	–	0
Willamette	0	–	3	–	1	1	–	5	–	1
+ – Conference co-champions

1924 Pacific Coast Conference football standings
	Conf.					Overall
Team	W		L		T	W		L		T
No. 5 Stanford ^ +	3	–	0	–	1	7	–	1	–	1
No. 2 California +	2	–	0	–	2	8	–	0	–	2
Washington	3	–	1	–	1	8	–	1	–	1
No. 7 USC	2	–	1	–	0	9	–	2	–	0
Idaho	4	–	2	–	0	5	–	2	–	1
Oregon	2	–	2	–	1	4	–	2	–	3
Oregon Agricultural	1	–	4	–	0	3	–	5	–	0
Washington State	0	–	4	–	1	1	–	5	–	2
Montana	0	–	3	–	0	4	–	4	–	0
+ – Conference co-champions; ^ – Selected as Rose Bowl representative; Rankings from Dickinson System

1924 Rocky Mountain Conference football standings
	Conf.					Overall
Team	W		L		T	W		L		T
Colorado $	5	–	0	–	1	8	–	1	–	1
Utah Agricultural	3	–	2	–	1	4	–	2	–	1
Colorado Agricultural	3	–	2	–	0	4	–	2	–	0
Denver	3	–	2	–	2	4	–	2	–	2
Colorado College	4	–	3	–	0	5	–	3	–	0
Montana State	1	–	1	–	1	5	–	1	–	1
Utah	2	–	2	–	1	3	–	4	–	1
Colorado Mines	2	–	4	–	1	4	–	4	–	1
BYU	1	–	3	–	1	2	–	3	–	1
Wyoming	1	–	6	–	0	2	–	6	–	0
$ – Conference champion

1924 Southern Conference football standings
	Conf.					Overall
Team	W		L		T	W		L		T
Alabama $	5	–	0	–	0	8	–	1	–	0
Florida	2	–	0	–	1	6	–	2	–	2
Georgia	5	–	1	–	0	7	–	3	–	0
Tulane	4	–	1	–	0	8	–	1	–	0
Washington and Lee	4	–	1	–	1	6	–	3	–	1
South Carolina	3	–	2	–	0	7	–	3	–	0
Sewanee *	3	–	2	–	0	6	–	4	–	0
Mississippi A&M	3	–	2	–	0	5	–	4	–	0
Virginia	3	–	2	–	0	5	–	4	–	0
Georgia Tech	3	–	2	–	1	5	–	3	–	1
Vanderbilt *	3	–	3	–	0	6	–	3	–	1
VPI	2	–	2	–	3	4	–	2	–	3
VMI	2	–	3	–	1	6	–	3	–	1
Kentucky	2	–	3	–	0	4	–	5	–	0
North Carolina	2	–	3	–	0	4	–	5	–	0
Auburn	2	–	4	–	1	4	–	4	–	1
Maryland	1	–	2	–	1	3	–	3	–	3
NC State	1	–	4	–	1	2	–	4	–	2
LSU	0	–	3	–	0	5	–	4	–	0
Ole Miss	0	–	3	–	0	4	–	5	–	0
Clemson	0	–	3	–	0	2	–	6	–	0
Tennessee	0	–	4	–	0	3	–	5	–	0
$ – Conference champion; * – co-member of SIAA

1924 Southwest Conference football standings
	Conf.					Overall
Team	W		L		T	W		L		T
Baylor $	4	–	0	–	1	7	–	2	–	1
SMU	2	–	0	–	4	5	–	0	–	4
Rice	2	–	2	–	0	4	–	4	–	0
Texas A&M	2	–	2	–	1	7	–	2	–	1
Oklahoma A&M	1	–	1	–	1	6	–	1	–	2
Texas	2	–	3	–	0	5	–	3	–	1
Arkansas	1	–	2	–	1	7	–	2	–	1
TCU	1	–	5	–	0	4	–	5	–	0
$ – Conference champion

=== Independents ===
1924 Eastern college football independents records
	Conf.			Overall
Team	W	L	T	W		L		T
No. 9 Dartmouth		–		7	–	0	–	1
No. 3 Yale		–		6	–	0	–	2
No. 8 Penn		–		9	–	1	–	1
Rutgers		–		7	–	1	–	1
Bucknell		–		8	–	2	–	0
Lafayette		–		7	–	2	–	0
Washington & Jefferson		–		7	–	2	–	0
Holy Cross		–		7	–	1	–	1
Army		–		5	–	1	–	2
Syracuse		–		8	–	2	–	1
Fordham		–		6	–	2	–	0
Lehigh		–		4	–	1	–	3
Boston College		–		6	–	3	–	0
Penn State		–		6	–	3	–	1
Princeton		–		4	–	2	–	1
Springfield		–		4	–	2	–	1
Columbia		–		5	–	3	–	1
Pittsburgh		–		5	–	3	–	1
NYU		–		4	–	3	–	1
CCNY		–		4	–	3	–	0
Brown		–		5	–	4	–	0
Carnegie Tech		–		5	–	4	–	0
Colgate		–		5	–	4	–	0
Cornell		–		4	–	4	–	0
Harvard		–		4	–	4	–	0
Tufts		–		3	–	4	–	2
Franklin & Marshall		–		3	–	5	–	1
Villanova		–		2	–	5	–	1
Drexel		–		2	–	7	–	0
Vermont		–		2	–	7	–	0
Temple		–		1	–	4	–	0
Boston University		–		1	–	5	–	0
Buffalo		–		1	–	7	–	0
Rankings from Dickinson System

1924 Midwestern college football independents records
	Conf.			Overall
Team	W	L	T	W		L		T
No. 1 Notre Dame		–		10	–	0	–	0
Kirksville Osteopaths		–		6	–	0	–	0
Central Michigan		–		7	–	1	–	0
Western State Normal		–		6	–	1	–	0
John Carroll		–		7	–	2	–	0
Haskell		–		7	–	2	–	1
Indiana State		–		6	–	2	–	0
Loyola (IL)		–		5	–	2	–	2
Marquette		–		5	–	2	–	0
Dayton		–		7	–	3	–	0
Saint Louis		–		6	–	3	–	0
Michigan Agricultural		–		5	–	3	–	0
Wabash		–		5	–	4	–	0
Butler		–		4	–	5	–	0
Detroit		–		4	–	5	–	0
Muncie Normal		–		1	–	3	–	0
Michigan Mines		–		0	–	2	–	1
Kent State		–		0	–	4	–	0
Rankings from Dickinson System

1924 Southern college football independents records
	Conf.			Overall
Team	W	L	T	W		L		T
Stetson		–		6	–	0	–	0
Quantico Marines		–		7	–	0	–	1
Tennessee Docs		–		9	–	1	–	0
Centenary		–		8	–	1	–	0
West Virginia		–		8	–	1	–	0
West Virginia Wesleyan		–		9	–	2	–	0
Davidson		–		7	–	2	–	1
Wake Forest		–		7	–	2	–	0
George Washington		–		6	–	3	–	1
William & Mary		–		5	–	2	–	1
Delaware		–		4	–	3	–	1
Texas Mines		–		3	–	2	–	1
Mississippi State Teachers		–		3	–	3	–	2
Birmingham–Southern		–		4	–	4	–	1
Spring Hill		–		4	–	4	–	1
Georgetown		–		4	–	4	–	0
Marshall		–		4	–	4	–	0
Duke		–		4	–	5	–	0
Western Kentucky State Normal		–		4	–	5	–	0
East Tennessee State Normal		–		3	–	4	–	1
Loyola (LA)		–		3	–	4	–	2
Abilene Christian		–		3	–	4	–	2
Louisville		–		3	–	5	–	1
Georgia Normal		–		1	–	2	–	0
Southwestern		–		3	–	6	–	0
Union (TN)		–		3	–	6	–	0
Richmond		–		2	–	6	–	1
Catholic University		–		1	–	5	–	2
Navy		–		2	–	6	–	0
Middle Tennessee State Normal		–		1	–	5	–	0
West Tennessee State Normal		–		1	–	7	–	1
Delaware State		–		0	–	1	–	0

1924 Western college football independents records
	Conf.			Overall
Team	W	L	T	W		L		T
Hawaii		–		8	–	0	–	0
Saint Mary's		–		8	–	1	–	0
La Verne		–		7	–	1	–	1
Tempe Normal		–		7	–	1	–	1
New Mexico A&M		–		7	–	3	–	0
Pacific (CA)		–		6	–	3	–	0
New Mexico		–		5	–	1	–	0
Cal Aggies		–		5	–	4	–	1
Nevada		–		3	–	4	–	1
Santa Clara		–		3	–	5	–	1
Arizona		–		2	–	4	–	0
Santa Barbara		–		2	–	5	–	1
Humboldt State		–		1	–	0	–	0

=== Minor conferences ===
Conference	Champion(s)	Record
California Coast Conference	Chico State Teachers	2–0
Central Intercollegiate Athletics Association	Lincoln (PA)	7–0–1
Inter-Normal Athletic Conference of Wisconsin	River Falls Normal	4–0
Iowa Intercollegiate Athletic Conference	Simpson	7–0–1
Kansas Collegiate Athletic Conference	Kansas State Normal–Pittsburg	5–0–1
Louisiana Intercollegiate Athletic Association	Southwestern Louisiana	3–0
Michigan Intercollegiate Athletic Association	Hillsdale	5–0
Midwest Collegiate Athletic Conference	Cornell College; Knox; Lawrence	3–0–1; 3–0; 1–0
Minnesota Intercollegiate Athletic Conference	Carleton	4–0
Missouri Intercollegiate Athletic Association	Northeast Missouri State Teachers	2–0–2
Nebraska Intercollegiate Conference	Nebraska State Teachers–Peru	6–0
North Central Intercollegiate Conference	South Dakota State College	5–0
Ohio Athletic Conference	Oberlin	8–0
Oklahoma Intercollegiate Conference	Central State Teachers	—
South Dakota Intercollegiate Conference	Columbus College	6–0
Southern California Intercollegiate Athletic Conference	Pomona	5–0
Southern Intercollegiate Athletic Conference	Tuskegee	—
Southwestern Athletic Conference	Paul Quinn	3–0
Texas Intercollegiate Athletic Association	Howard Payne	5–0
Tri-Normal League	State Normal–Bellingham	2–0

=== Minor conference standings ===
1924 California Coast Conference football standings
	Conf.					Overall
Team	W		L		T	W		L		T
Chico State $	2	–	0	–	0	7	–	2	–	0
Fresno State	3	–	0	–	0	7	–	2	–	0
Modesto	2	–	1	–	0	3	–	4	–	1
San Mateo	1	–	1	–	0	?	–	?	–	?
Bakersfield	1	–	2	–	0	2	–	3	–	2
San Jose State	0	–	1	–	0	1	–	4	–	0
Sacramento	0	–	1	–	0	?	–	?	–	?
Cal Poly	0	–	3	–	0	1	–	5	–	0
$ – Conference champion

1924 Colored Intercollegiate Athletic Association football standings
	Conf.					Overall
Team	W		L		T	W		L		T
Lincoln (PA) $	5	–	0	–	1	7	–	0	–	1
Virginia Union	3	–	1	–	2	4	–	1	–	3
Hampton	3	–	3	–	1	4	–	3	–	1
Virginia Normal	1	–	2	–	3	5	–	3	–	3
Virginia Seminary	2	–	3	–	0	4	–	4	–	0
Shaw	1	–	2	–	1	1	–	2	–	2
Howard	1	–	1	–	1	2	–	1	–	3
Saint Paul (VA)	0	–	4	–	1	4	–	4	–	2
$ – Conference champion

1924 Columbia Valley Conference football standings
	Conf.					Overall
Team	W		L		T	W		L		T
Cheney Normal +	2	–	0	–	1	3	–	4	–	1
Spokane College +	2	–	0	–	1	?	–	?	–	?
Whitworth	1	–	2	–	0	?	–	?	–	?
Lewiston Normal	0	–	3	–	0	?	–	?	–	?
+ – Conference co-champions

1924 Illinois Intercollegiate Athletic Conference football standings
	Conf.					Overall
Team	W		L		T	W		L		T
Lombard +	5	–	0	–	0	5	–	4	–	0
Knox (IL) +	4	–	0	–	0	7	–	1	–	0
Bradley	7	–	1	–	0	8	–	1	–	0
Eastern Illinois	5	–	2	–	0	6	–	2	–	0
McKendree *	4	–	2	–	0	4	–	4	–	0
Millikin	4	–	2	–	0	4	–	4	–	0
Monmouth (IL)	5	–	3	–	1	5	–	4	–	1
Shurtleff	3	–	2	–	0	3	–	3	–	0
Wheaton (IL)	3	–	2	–	0	4	–	3	–	0
Western Illinois	3	–	3	–	0	4	–	3	–	0
Illinois College	4	–	4	–	0	5	–	4	–	0
Illinois Wesleyan	4	–	4	–	0	4	–	4	–	0
Eureka	3	–	4	–	1	3	–	4	–	1
Carthage	2	–	3	–	1	3	–	4	–	1
Mount Morris	2	–	3	–	0	5	–	5	–	0
Illinois State Normal	2	–	4	–	2	2	–	4	–	2
Southern Illinois	1	–	2	–	0	6	–	2	–	0
St. Viator †	1	–	2	–	0	1	–	5	–	2
Northern Illinois State	1	–	3	–	0	4	–	4	–	0
Augustana (IL)	2	–	7	–	0	2	–	7	–	0
Lake Forest	1	–	4	–	0	1	–	6	–	0
Lincoln (IL)	1	–	5	–	1	2	–	5	–	1
Blackburn	0	–	4	–	0	1	–	7	–	0
$ – Conference champion; * – McKendree finished the season 5–0–1 in conference play, but forfeited a tie with Illinois College and a win over Eastern Illinois. † – St. Viator finished the season 2–1 in conference play, but forfeited a win over Illinois Wesleyan.

1924 Indiana Intercollegiate Conference football standings
	Conf.					Overall
Team	W		L		T	W		L		T
Notre Dame $	1	–	0	–	0	10	–	0	–	0
Butler	4	–	0	–	0	4	–	5	–	0
Indiana State	4	–	1	–	0	5	–	2	–	0
Franklin	4	–	2	–	0	5	–	3	–	0
Earlham	4	–	2	–	0	5	–	3	–	0
Oakland City	4	–	2	–	0	4	–	2	–	0
Wabash	3	–	2	–	0	5	–	4	–	0
Indiana Central	3	–	2	–	0	4	–	2	–	0
Evansville	2	–	3	–	0	3	–	4	–	0
Rose Poly	2	–	3	–	0	3	–	6	–	0
Hanover	3	–	4	–	0	4	–	4	–	0
DePauw	1	–	3	–	0	2	–	6	–	0
Ball State	1	–	3	–	0	1	–	3	–	0
Manchester	0	–	1	–	0	0	–	1	–	0
Vincennes	0	–	2	–	0	0	–	2	–	0
Central Normal	0	–	6	–	0	1	–	6	–	0
$ – Conference champion

1924 Iowa Conference football standings
	Conf.					Overall
Team	W		L		T	W		L		T
Simpson (IA) $	7	–	0	–	1	8	–	0	–	1
Parsons	5	–	0	–	1	6	–	1	–	1
Buena Vista	3	–	0	–	0	5	–	1	–	2
Penn (IA)	5	–	2	–	0	6	–	2	–	0
Morningside	2	–	1	–	0	2	–	5	–	0
St. Ambrose	2	–	2	–	0	4	–	2	–	1
Upper Iowa	2	–	3	–	1	2	–	4	–	1
Central (IA)	1	–	2	–	0	2	–	4	–	1
Iowa Wesleyan	1	–	4	–	0	3	–	7	–	0
Ellsworth	1	–	4	–	0	2	–	5	–	0
Des Moines	1	–	4	–	0	2	–	6	–	0
Iowa State Teachers	1	–	5	–	0	2	–	5	–	0
Luther	0	–	1	–	1	4	–	3	–	1
Western Union	0	–	3	–	0	1	–	5	–	1
$ – Conference champion

1924 Kansas Collegiate Athletic Conference football standings
	Conf.					Overall
Team	W		L		T	W		L		T
Pittsburg Teachers $	5	–	0	–	1	7	–	0	–	1
College of Emporia	6	–	1	–	0	6	–	1	–	0
Sterling	6	–	2	–	1	6	–	2	–	1
Fairmount	5	–	2	–	1	6	–	2	–	1
Kansas Wesleyan	5	–	3	–	0	5	–	3	–	0
Bethany (KS)	4	–	3	–	2	4	–	3	–	2
Emporia Teachers	3	–	3	–	2	3	–	4	–	2
Southwestern (KS)	2	–	2	–	2	4	–	2	–	2
Friends	3	–	4	–	1	3	–	4	–	1
Hays Teachers	3	–	4	–	0	3	–	4	–	0
McPherson	3	–	5	–	1	3	–	5	–	1
Baker	3	–	5	–	0	4	–	5	–	0
St. Mary's (KS)	2	–	4	–	0	3	–	4	–	0
Ottawa	2	–	6	–	1	2	–	6	–	1
Bethel (KS)	1	–	4	–	0	1	–	4	–	0
Washburn	1	–	6	–	0	2	–	7	–	0
$ – Conference champion

1924 Michigan Intercollegiate Athletic Association football standings
	Conf.					Overall
Team	W		L		T	W		L		T
Hillsdale $	5	–	0	–	0	6	–	1	–	1
Albion	4	–	1	–	0	6	–	3	–	0
Alma	3	–	2	–	0	3	–	5	–	0
Michigan State Normal	2	–	3	–	0	2	–	5	–	1
Olivet	1	–	4	–	0	2	–	6	–	0
Kalamazoo	0	–	5	–	0	2	–	6	–	0
$ – Conference champion

1924 Midwest Conference football standings
	Conf.					Overall
Team	W		L		T	W		L		T
Cornell (IA) +	3	–	0	–	1	6	–	0	–	1
Knox +	3	–	0	–	0	7	–	1	–	0
Lawrence +	1	–	0	–	1	4	–	1	–	1
Coe	2	–	2	–	0	3	–	4	–	1
Ripon	1	–	1	–	1	2	–	3	–	2
Carleton	1	–	2	–	0	5	–	2	–	0
Beloit	1	–	3	–	1	3	–	3	–	1
Millikin	0	–	1	–	0	4	–	4	–	0
Monmouth (IL)	0	–	1	–	0	5	–	4	–	1
Hamline	0	–	2	–	0	1	–	5	–	0
+ – Conference co-champions

1924 Minnesota Intercollegiate Athletic Conference football standings
	Conf.					Overall
Team	W		L		T	W		L		T
Carleton $	4	–	0	–	0	5	–	2	–	0
St. Thomas (MN)	3	–	0	–	0	5	–	2	–	0
St. Olaf	3	–	2	–	0	4	–	2	–	1
Gustavus Adolphus	2	–	2	–	1	2	–	4	–	1
Concordia (MN)	1	–	2	–	0	2	–	3	–	1
Macalester	1	–	2	–	2	1	–	3	–	2
Hamline	1	–	3	–	0	1	–	5	–	0
Saint John's (MN)	0	–	4	–	1	1	–	4	–	1
$ – Conference champion

1924 Missouri College Athletic Union football standings
	Conf.					Overall
Team	W		L		T	W		L		T
Westminster (MO) $	7	–	0	–	0	9	–	0	–	0
Missouri Wesleyan	5	–	1	–	0	6	–	2	–	0
William Jewell	3	–	2	–	1	4	–	3	–	1
Missouri Mines	1	–	1	–	0	3	–	6	–	0
Missouri Valley	2	–	3	–	1	3	–	3	–	1
Drury	2	–	3	–	0	3	–	4	–	0
Culver–Stockton	1	–	3	–	0	4	–	4	–	0
Tarkio	0	–	4	–	0	2	–	6	–	0
Central (MO)	0	–	4	–	0	0	–	8	–	0
$ – Conference champion

1924 Missouri Intercollegiate Athletic Association football standings
	Conf.					Overall
Team	W		L		T	W		L		T
Maryville (MO) +	3	–	1	–	0	6	–	1	–	1
Kirksville +	2	–	0	–	2	6	–	2	–	1
Warrensburg	2	–	1	–	1	4	–	4	–	1
Cape Girardeau	1	–	3	–	0	3	–	3	–	2
Springfield (MO)	0	–	3	–	1	4	–	2	–	2
+ – Conference co-champions

1924 Nebraska College Athletic Conference football standings
	Conf.					Overall
Team	W		L		T	W		L		T
Peru Normal $	6	–	0	–	0	8	–	0	–	0
Hastings	4	–	0	–	1	5	–	1	–	2
Chadron Normal	5	–	1	–	0	8	–	1	–	0
Grand Island	5	–	1	–	0	5	–	1	–	1
Midland	3	–	1	–	1	3	–	3	–	2
York (NE)	5	–	3	–	0	6	–	3	–	0
Kearney Normal	3	–	4	–	1	3	–	4	–	1
Cotner	2	–	4	–	0	3	–	5	–	0
Doane	1	–	6	–	1	1	–	6	–	1
Wayne Normal	1	–	6	–	0	1	–	6	–	1
Omaha	0	–	3	–	0	0	–	6	–	0
Nebraska Central	0	–	6	–	0	0	–	6	–	0
$ – Conference champion

1924 New England Conference football standings
	Conf.					Overall
Team	W		L		T	W		L		T
Connecticut $	4	–	0	–	0	6	–	0	–	2
New Hampshire	2	–	1	–	0	7	–	2	–	0
Maine	1	–	2	–	0	4	–	3	–	1
Massachusetts	0	–	1	–	0	6	–	1	–	1
Rhode Island State	0	–	3	–	0	0	–	7	–	0
$ – Conference champion

1924 North Central Conference football standings
	Conf.					Overall
Team	W		L		T	W		L		T
South Dakota State $	5	–	0	–	0	7	–	1	–	0
South Dakota	4	–	1	–	0	6	–	2	–	0
Creighton	3	–	1	–	0	6	–	1	–	2
North Dakota Agricultural	3	–	3	–	0	5	–	3	–	0
Nebraska Wesleyan	1	–	2	–	0	2	–	4	–	2
Des Moines	1	–	3	–	0	2	–	6	–	0
Morningside	1	–	4	–	0	2	–	5	–	0
North Dakota	1	–	4	–	0	3	–	3	–	0
St. Thomas (MN)	0	–	1	–	0	5	–	2	–	0
$ – Conference champion

1924 Ohio Athletic Conference football standings
	Conf.					Overall
Team	W		L		T	W		L		T
Oberlin $	8	–	0	–	0	8	–	0	–	0
Wittenberg	6	–	1	–	0	7	–	1	–	0
Ohio Wesleyan	4	–	1	–	0	7	–	2	–	0
Case	6	–	2	–	1	6	–	2	–	1
Wooster	5	–	2	–	1	6	–	2	–	2
Akron	3	–	2	–	0	5	–	3	–	0
Western Reserve	3	–	2	–	2	5	–	2	–	2
Heidelberg	3	–	2	–	2	3	–	3	–	2
Mount Union	4	–	3	–	1	5	–	4	–	1
Ohio Northern	3	–	3	–	1	4	–	3	–	1
St. Xavier	1	–	1	–	1	2	–	5	–	1
Kenyon	3	–	4	–	1	4	–	4	–	1
Denison	3	–	4	–	0	3	–	4	–	1
Ohio	2	–	4	–	0	4	–	4	–	0
Otterbein	2	–	5	–	0	2	–	5	–	0
Muskingum	2	–	5	–	0	2	–	6	–	0
Cincinnati	1	–	4	–	0	2	–	6	–	1
Baldwin–Wallace	1	–	4	–	0	1	–	7	–	0
Miami (OH)	1	–	5	–	0	2	–	6	–	0
Hiram	0	–	7	–	0	1	–	7	–	0
$ – Conference champion

1924 Oklahoma Intercollegiate Conference football standings
	Conf.					Overall
Team	W		L		T	W		L		T
Central State Teachers $	7	–	0	–	0	9	–	2	–	0
Oklahoma Baptist	6	–	1	–	0	8	–	3	–	0
Southeastern Oklahoma State	4	–	2	–	0	4	–	4	–	0
Southwestern State	3	–	2	–	0	5	–	3	–	0
Northwestern Oklahoma State	2	–	2	–	1	4	–	4	–	1
Phillips	2	–	3	–	0	2	–	7	–	0
East Central	3	–	5	–	0	3	–	6	–	0
Tulsa	0	–	1	–	1	1	–	6	–	1
Northeastern State	0	–	4	–	0	3	–	6	–	0
Oklahoma City	0	–	7	–	0	1	–	8	–	0
$ – Conference champion

1924 South Dakota Intercollegiate Conference football standings
	Conf.					Overall
Team	W		L		T	W		L		T
Columbus (SD) $	6	–	0	–	0	6	–	2	–	0
Augustana (SD)	6	–	1	–	0	6	–	2	–	0
South Dakota Mines	5	–	1	–	0	6	–	2	–	0
Yankton	5	–	1	–	0	5	–	2	–	1
Dakota Wesleyan	3	–	1	–	0	4	–	4	–	0
Northern Normal	3	–	3	–	0	4	–	3	–	0
Eastern Normal	2	–	4	–	0	2	–	5	–	0
Sioux Falls	1	–	5	–	0	1	–	5	–	0
Spearfish	0	–	4	–	0	1	–	6	–	0
Southern Normal	0	–	5	–	0	2	–	6	–	1
Huron	0	–	6	–	0	0	–	6	–	0
$ – Conference champion

1924 Southern California Conference football standings
	Conf.					Overall
Team	W		L		T	W		L		T
Pomona $	5	–	0	–	0	5	–	2	–	0
Occidental	4	–	1	–	0	4	–	4	–	0
Whittier	3	–	2	–	0	4	–	3	–	0
Redlands	1	–	3	–	1	1	–	5	–	2
Caltech	1	–	4	–	0	3	–	6	–	0
Southern Branch	0	–	4	–	1	0	–	5	–	3
$ – Conference champion

1924 Southern Intercollegiate Athletic Association football standings
	Conf.					Overall
Team	W		L		T	W		L		T
Centre +	1	–	0	–	0	5	–	1	–	1
Oglethorpe +	5	–	0	–	0	6	–	3	–	1
Mississippi College	2	–	0	–	1	2	–	5	–	1
Newberry	4	–	1	–	0	8	–	2	–	0
Mercer	4	–	1	–	1	5	–	3	–	2
Sewanee*	2	–	1	–	0	6	–	4	–	0
The Citadel	4	–	2	–	0	6	–	4	–	0
Louisville	2	–	1	–	0	3	–	4	–	1
Millsaps	1	–	1	–	0	3	–	5	–	1
Georgetown (KY)	1	–	1	–	0	1	–	4	–	0
Transylvania	1	–	2	–	0	6	–	2	–	0
Furman	1	–	2	–	0	5	–	5	–	0
Wofford	2	–	4	–	0	3	–	7	–	0
Howard (AL)	1	–	3	–	0	3	–	5	–	1
Presbyterian	1	–	3	–	0	1	–	6	–	1
Vanderbilt*	0	–	1	–	0	6	–	3	–	1
Louisiana College	0	–	1	–	0	0	–	1	–	0
Western Kentucky	0	–	2	–	0	4	–	6	–	0
Erskine	0	–	4	–	0	1	–	7	–	0
Chattanooga	0	–	5	–	0	1	–	7	–	1
+ – Conference co-champions; * – co-member of SoCon

1924 Southwestern Athletic Conference football standings
	Conf.					Overall
Team	W		L		T	W		L		T
Paul Quinn $	3	–	0	–	2	6	–	0	–	3
Prairie View	3	–	1	–	1	5	–	1	–	1
Bishop	3	–	1	–	1	4	–	1	–	2
Samuel Huston	2	–	3	–	0	?	–	?	–	?
Wiley	2	–	3	–	0	4	–	4	–	0
Texas College	0	–	5	–	0	?	–	?	–	?
$ – Conference champion

1924 Texas Intercollegiate Athletic Association football standings
	Conf.					Overall
Team	W		L		T	W		L		T
Howard Payne $	5	–	0	–	0	7	–	2	–	0
North Texas State Teachers	4	–	1	–	1	5	–	3	–	1
Southwest Texas State	4	–	2	–	0	5	–	3	–	0
Rice	2	–	1	–	0	4	–	4	–	0
Southwestern (TX)	3	–	2	–	0	4	–	5	–	0
Austin	2	–	2	–	1	7	–	3	–	1
West Texas State	2	–	2	–	0	5	–	4	–	0
Daniel Baker	2	–	4	–	1	3	–	6	–	1
Trinity (TX)	2	–	4	–	2	2	–	7	–	2
Simmons (TX)	2	–	4	–	0	2	–	6	–	0
Abilene Christian	1	–	3	–	0	3	–	4	–	2
East Texas State	1	–	3	–	0	3	–	5	–	1
Sam Houston State	1	–	3	–	1	2	–	5	–	1
$ – Conference champion

1924 Tri-Normal Conference football standings
	Conf.					Overall
Team	W		L		T	W		L		T
Bellingham Normal $	2	–	0	–	0	4	–	2	–	0
Cheney Normal	1	–	1	–	0	3	–	4	–	1
Ellensburg Normal	0	–	2	–	0	1	–	4	–	0
$ – Conference champion

1924 Tri-State Conference football standings
	Conf.					Overall
Team	W		L		T	W		L		T
Geneva +	2	–	0	–	1	3	–	4	–	2
Thiel +	2	–	0	–	1	3	–	5	–	1
Westminster (PA)	1	–	2	–	0	4	–	6	–	0
Bethany (WV)	0	–	1	–	0	1	–	7	–	1
Duquesne	0	–	2	–	0	2	–	4	–	2
+ – Conference co-champions

1924 Western Interstate Conference football standings
	Conf.					Overall
Team	W		L		T	W		L		T
Columbia (IA) $	3	–	1	–	1	5	–	2	–	1
La Crosse Normal	1	–	1	–	1	3	–	2	–	2
Luther	1	–	1	–	0	4	–	3	–	1
Valparaiso	1	–	1	–	1	4	–	3	–	2
DePaul	0	–	1	–	0	3	–	3	–	1
St. Viator	0	–	1	–	1	1	–	5	–	2
$ – Conference champion

1924 Wisconsin Normal Athletic Conference football standings
	Conf.					Overall
Team	W		L		T	W		L		T
River Falls Normal $	4	–	0	–	0	7	–	0	–	0
Whitewater Normal	2	–	1	–	0	6	–	1	–	0
Milwaukee Normal	2	–	1	–	0	4	–	2	–	0
La Crosse Normal	2	–	1	–	0	3	–	2	–	2
Oshkosh Normal	3	–	2	–	0	5	–	3	–	0
Eau Claire Normal	2	–	2	–	0	5	–	2	–	0
Superior Normal	2	–	2	–	0	3	–	5	–	0
Stout Normal	1	–	2	–	0	3	–	3	–	1
Platteville Normal	1	–	4	–	0	1	–	5	–	2
Stevens Point Normal	1	–	5	–	0	2	–	5	–	0
$ – Conference champion

== Awards and honors ==
=== All-Americans ===
The consensus All-America team included:

Position	Name	Height	Weight (lbs.)	Class	Hometown	Team
QB	Harry Stuhldreher	5'7"	151	Sr.	Massillon, Ohio	Notre Dame
HB	Red Grange	5'11"	175	Jr.	Wheaton, Illinois	Illinois
HB	Jim Crowley	5'11"	162	Sr.	Green Bay, Wisconsin	Notre Dame
FB	Elmer Layden	6'0"	162	Sr.	Davenport, Iowa	Notre Dame
E	Jim Lawson	5'11"	190	Sr.	Long Beach, California	Stanford
E	Hek Wakefield	5'10"	180	Sr.	Petersburg, Tennessee	Vanderbilt
T	Ed Weir	6'0"	190	Jr.	Superior, Nebraska	Nebraska
G	Carl Diehl	6'1"	205	Jr.	Chicago, Illinois	Dartmouth
C	Edwin C. Horrell	6'2"	185	Sr.	Pasadena, California	California
G	Joe Pondelik	5-11	215	Sr.	Cicero, Illinois	Chicago
T	Ed McGinley	5'11"	185	Sr.	Swarthmore, Pennsylvania	Penn
E	Richard Luman	6-1	176	Sr.	Pinedale, Wyoming	Yale

== Statistical leaders ==
- Player scoring most points: Heinie Benkert, Rutgers, 100 (16 touchdowns and four extra points)
- Total offense leader: Red Grange, Illinois, 1176
