= 1924 Washington State Cougars football team =

American college football season

1924 Washington State Cougars football
- Conference: Northwest Conference, Pacific Coast Conference
- Record: 1–5–2 (1–4–2 Northwest, 0–4–1 PCC)
- Head coach: Albert Exendine (2nd season)
- Captain: Harold Slater
- Home stadium: Rogers Field

1924 Northwest Conference football standings
	Conf.					Overall
Team	W		L		T	W		L		T
Idaho +	4	–	0	–	1	5	–	2	–	1
Gonzaga +	3	–	0	–	2	5	–	0	–	2
Washington	5	–	1	–	0	8	–	1	–	1
Oregon	4	–	1	–	2	4	–	2	–	3
Oregon Agricultural	2	–	3	–	0	3	–	5	–	0
Montana	2	–	3	–	0	4	–	4	–	0
Pacific (OR)	1	–	3	–	0	3	–	4	–	0
Washington State	1	–	4	–	2	2	–	4	–	1
Whitman	1	–	5	–	0	1	–	5	–	0
Willamette	0	–	3	–	1	1	–	5	–	1
+ – Conference co-champions

1924 Pacific Coast Conference football standings
	Conf.					Overall
Team	W		L		T	W		L		T
No. 5 Stanford ^ +	3	–	0	–	1	7	–	1	–	1
No. 2 California +	2	–	0	–	2	8	–	0	–	2
Washington	3	–	1	–	1	8	–	1	–	1
No. 7 USC	2	–	1	–	0	9	–	2	–	0
Idaho	4	–	2	–	0	5	–	2	–	1
Oregon	2	–	2	–	1	4	–	2	–	3
Oregon Agricultural	1	–	4	–	0	3	–	5	–	0
Washington State	0	–	4	–	1	1	–	5	–	2
Montana	0	–	3	–	0	4	–	4	–	0
+ – Conference co-champions; ^ – Selected as Rose Bowl representative; Rankings from Dickinson System

The 1924 Washington State Cougars football team represented Washington State College—now known as Washington State University—as a member of the Northwest Conference and the Pacific Coast Conference (PCC) during the 1924 college football season. In their second season under head coach Albert Exendine, the Cougars compiled an overall record of 1–5–2 and outscored their opponents by a combined total of 107 to 88. Washington State had a record of 1–4–2 in Northwest Conference play, placing eighth, and 0–4–1 against PCC opponents, tying for eighth place.

== Schedule ==
Date	Opponent	Site	Result	Attendance	Source
October 4	Pacific (OR)	Rogers Field; Pullman, WA	W 65–0	4,000	
October 11	Gonzaga	Rogers Field; Pullman, WA	L 12–14	8,000	
October 17	at Idaho	MacLean Field; Moscow, ID (rivalry)	L 3–19	10,000	
October 25	at California	California Memorial Stadium; Berkeley, CA	L 7–20	35,000	
November 7	Oregon Agricultural^{†}	Rogers Field; Pullman, WA	L 13–14	3,000	
November 15	at Oregon	Multnomah Field; Portland, OR	T 7–7	10,000	
November 22	at Washington	Husky Stadium; Seattle, WA (rivalry)	L 0–14	10,000	
November 27	at Gonzaga	Gonzaga Stadium; Spokane, WA	T 0–0	8,000	
^{†}Homecoming
