= 1924 Oregon Webfoots football team =

American college football season

1924 Oregon Webfoots football
- Conference: Northwest Conference, Pacific Coast Conference
- Record: 4–2–3 (4–1–2 Northwest, 2–2–1 PCC)
- Head coach: Joe Maddock (1st season)
- Captain: Dick Reed
- Home stadium: Hayward Field

1924 Northwest Conference football standings
	Conf.					Overall
Team	W		L		T	W		L		T
Idaho +	4	–	0	–	1	5	–	2	–	1
Gonzaga +	3	–	0	–	2	5	–	0	–	2
Washington	5	–	1	–	0	8	–	1	–	1
Oregon	4	–	1	–	2	4	–	2	–	3
Oregon Agricultural	2	–	3	–	0	3	–	5	–	0
Montana	2	–	3	–	0	4	–	4	–	0
Pacific (OR)	1	–	3	–	0	3	–	4	–	0
Washington State	1	–	4	–	2	2	–	4	–	1
Whitman	1	–	5	–	0	1	–	5	–	0
Willamette	0	–	3	–	1	1	–	5	–	1
+ – Conference co-champions

1924 Pacific Coast Conference football standings
	Conf.					Overall
Team	W		L		T	W		L		T
No. 5 Stanford ^ +	3	–	0	–	1	7	–	1	–	1
No. 2 California +	2	–	0	–	2	8	–	0	–	2
Washington	3	–	1	–	1	8	–	1	–	1
No. 7 USC	2	–	1	–	0	9	–	2	–	0
Idaho	4	–	2	–	0	5	–	2	–	1
Oregon	2	–	2	–	1	4	–	2	–	3
Oregon Agricultural	1	–	4	–	0	3	–	5	–	0
Washington State	0	–	4	–	1	1	–	5	–	2
Montana	0	–	3	–	0	4	–	4	–	0
+ – Conference co-champions; ^ – Selected as Rose Bowl representative; Rankings from Dickinson System

The 1924 Oregon Webfoots football team represented the University of Oregon as a member of the Northwest Conference and the Pacific Coast Conference (PCC) during the 1924 college football season. In their first and only season under head coach Joe Maddock, the Webfoots compiled ann overall record of 4–2–3 and outscored their opponents 94 to 60. Oregon had a record of 4–1–2 in Northwest Conference play, placing fourth, and 2–2–1 against PCC opponents, finishing sixth. The team played home games on campus, at Hayward Field in Eugene, Oregon.

== Schedule ==
Date	Opponent	Site	Result	Attendance	Source
September 27	at Willamette	Sweetland Field; Salem, OR	T 0–0		
October 11	Pacific (OR)	Hayward Field; Eugene, OR	W 20–0		
October 18	at Stanford	Stanford Stadium; Stanford, CA	L 13–28		
October 25	Whitman	Hayward Field; Eugene, OR	W 40–6		
November 1	Washington	Hayward Field; Eugene, OR (rivalry)	W 7–3	3,000	
November 8	at Idaho	MacLean Field; Moscow, ID	L 0–13		
November 15	Washington State	Multnomah Field; Portland, OR	T 7–7	10,000	
November 22	at Oregon Agricultural	Bell Field; Corvallis, OR (rivalry)	W 7–3		
November 27	at Multnomah Athletic Club*	Multnomah Field; Portland, OR	L 0–6		
*Non-conference game; Source:
