= Harry Stuhldreher =

American football player, coach, and administrator (1901–1965)

Biographical details
- Born: October 14, 1901; Massillon, Ohio, U.S.
- Died: January 26, 1965 (aged 63); Pittsburgh, Pennsylvania, U.S.

Playing career
- 1922–1924: Notre Dame
- 1925–1926: Waterbury Blues
- 1926: Brooklyn Horsemen/Lions
- Position: Quarterback

Coaching career (HC unless noted)
- 1925–1935: Villanova
- 1936–1948: Wisconsin

Administrative career (AD unless noted)
- 1936–1950: Wisconsin

Head coaching record
- Overall: 110–87–15

Accomplishments and honors

Championships
- National (1924)

Awards
- Amos Alonzo Stagg Award (1965); Consensus All-American (1924)
- College Football Hall of Fame; Inducted in 1958 (profile)

Harry Augustus Stuhldreher (October 14, 1901 – January 26, 1965) was an American football player, coach, and college athletics administrator. He played quarterback at University of Notre Dame from 1922 to 1924, where he was a three-time All-American and member of the legendary "Four Horsemen" backfield. After graduating from Notre Dame, Stuhldreher played professional football briefly with the Brooklyn Horsemen/Lions in 1926. He served as the head football coach at Villanova College—now known as Villanova University—from 1925 to 1935 and at the University of Wisconsin–Madison from 1936 to 1948, compiling a career college football record of 110–87–15. Stuhldreher was inducted into the College Football Hall of Fame as a player in 1958.

== Early years and playing career ==
Stuhldreher was born in Massillon, Ohio of German stock, home of the Massillon Tigers professional football team. There is a story, likely apocryphal, that as a boy Stuhldreher carried gear for future University of Notre Dame football coach Knute Rockne when the latter was a Tigers star.

Stuhldreher played football for both Massillon Washington High School and The Kiski School in Saltsburg, Pennsylvania, from which he graduated in 1921. At Notre Dame, he became quarterback in 1922 and in 1924 led the team to a 10–0 record, culminating in 27–10 win over Stanford in the 1925 Rose Bowl, and a national championship. He was one of the smallest quarterbacks in Notre Dame football history, standing 5' 7" tall and weighing just 151 pounds.

After graduating, Stuhldreher joined fellow member of the Four Horsemen Elmer Layden on the roster of the Brooklyn Horsemen of the first American Football League. After playing only six games of the 1926 season, the Horsemen merged with the National Football League's Brooklyn Lions franchise, which then was renamed the Horsemen. The AFL, the Brooklyn NFL franchise, and Stuhldreher's major league football career all ended with the last game of the season.

== Coaching career ==
Stuhldreher turned to college coaching, initially also moonlighting for independent pro teams on weekends. He served for 11 years (1925–1935) as head coach at Villanova University, compiling a 65–25–9 record, and 13 years (1936–1948) as head coach and athletic director at the University of Wisconsin–Madison. During his tenure at Wisconsin, he compiled a 45–62–6 (.425) record, and the Badgers were twice the Big Ten Conference runner-up under his guidance.

== Later life and honors ==
Leaving Wisconsin, Stuhldreher joined U.S. Steel in Pittsburgh in 1950. He died in Pittsburgh of acute pancreatitis and is buried in Calvary Cemetery, Pittsburgh, Pennsylvania.

Stuhldreher wrote two books, "Quarterback Play" and "Knute Rockne, Man Builder." The latter was a source for the movie Knute Rockne, All American, starring Ronald Reagan as George Gipp. Former Notre Dame star Nick Lukats played the part of Stuhldreher in this movie. Stuhldreher's wife Mary was also a writer. The couple had four sons.

Stuhldreher was elected to the College Football Hall of Fame in 1958.

== Head coaching record ==
Year	Team	Overall	Conference	Standing	Bowl/playoffs	AP^{#}
Villanova Wildcats (Independent) (1925–1935)
1925	Villanova	6–2–1				
1926	Villanova	6–2–1				
1927	Villanova	6–1				
1928	Villanova	7–0–1				
1929	Villanova	7–2–1				
1930	Villanova	5–5				
1931	Villanova	4–3–2				
1932	Villanova	7–2				
1933	Villanova	7–2–1				
1934	Villanova	3–4–2				
1935	Villanova	7–2				
Villanova:		65–25–9				
Wisconsin Badgers (Big Ten Conference) (1936–1948)
1936	Wisconsin	2–6	0–4	9th		
1937	Wisconsin	4–3–1	2–2–1	T–4th		
1938	Wisconsin	5–3	3–2	T–4th		
1939	Wisconsin	1–6–1	0–5–1	9th		
1940	Wisconsin	4–4	3–3	T–4th		
1941	Wisconsin	3–5	3–3	5th		
1942	Wisconsin	8–1–1	4–1	2nd		3
1943	Wisconsin	1–9	1–6	8th		
1944	Wisconsin	3–6	2–4	7th		
1945	Wisconsin	3–4–2	2–3–1	6th		
1946	Wisconsin	4–5	2–5	8th		
1947	Wisconsin	5–3–1	3–2–1	2nd		
1948	Wisconsin	2–7	1–5	9th		
Wisconsin:		45–62–6	26–45–4			
Total:		110–87–15				
^{#}Rankings from final AP Poll.
