= Short punt formation =

Formation in American football

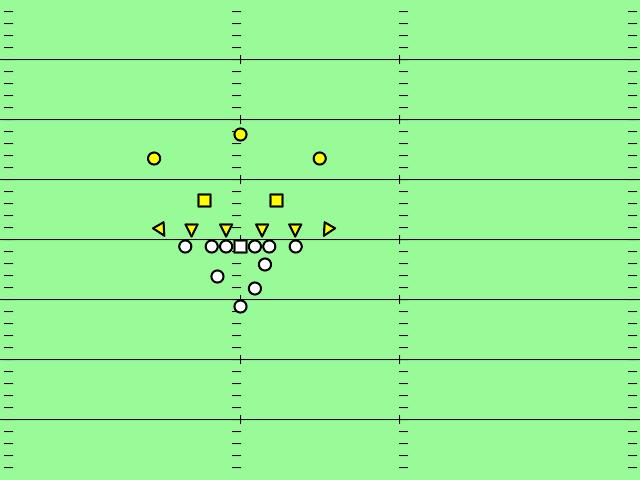
Short Punt formation versus a 6–2–3 defense

The short punt formation is an older formation on both offense and defense in American football, popular when scoring was harder and a good punt was itself an offensive weapon. In times when punting on third down was fairly common, teams would line up in the short punt formation and offer the triple threat of punt, run or pass. Harper's Weekly in 1915 called it "the most valuable formation known to football."

The formation is similar to the single wing and modern shotgun by including the possibility of a long snap from center. However, it is generally a balanced formation, and there are backs on both sides of the tailback, offering better pass protection. As a result, it was considered a much better passing formation than running, as the premiere running formation was the single wing. That said, it was regarded as a good formation for trap plays.

== History ==
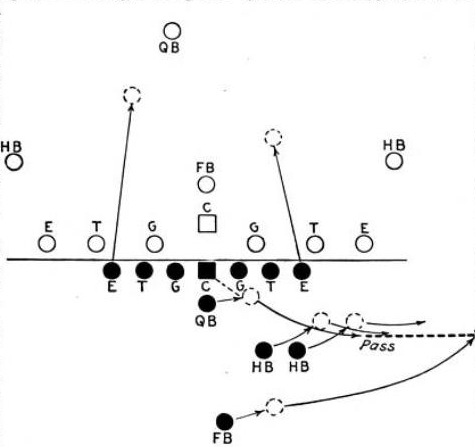
A play showing the short punt on offense and defense, and the quarterback under center

The formation was invented by Amos Alonzo Stagg in 1896. Andy Smith, coach of California's "Wonder Teams" summed up the short-punt philosophy with his motto of "Kick and wait for the breaks." In the early days of the sport the ball was often moved up the field, not through offensive plays, but rather through punting. Once the opposing team got the ball, the defense was relied upon to make the other team's offense lose yards or fumble. To confuse the opponent and attain longer punts, the punting was often done on first or second downs and it was not uncommon for a team to kick more than 40 times in a game.

The formation was used extensively by Fielding Yost's "point-a-minute", hurry up Michigan Wolverines in their early history, as well as his disciple Dan McGugin's Vanderbilt Commodores. Bill Roper used the short punt at Princeton.

=== Pro football ===
The short punt was the base formation for the Benny Friedman-led New York Giants in 1931. In the 1956 NFL Championship, the Chicago Bears shifted into a short punt formation in the third quarter, after falling way behind.

== See also ==
- Glossary of American football
- Early history of American football
- Punt
