= 1925 Rose Bowl =

American college football game

- 11th Rose Bowl Game; Rivalry game National Championship Game
Notre Dame Fighting Irish	Stanford
(9–0)	(7–0–1)
Independent	PCC
27	10
Head coach: Knute Rockne	Head coach: Pop Warner
	1	2	3	4	Total
Notre Dame	0	13	7	7	27
Stanford	3	0	7	0	10
- Date: January 1, 1925
- Season: 1924
- Stadium: Rose Bowl Stadium
- Location: Pasadena, California
- MVP: Elmer Layden (Notre Dame); Ernie Nevers (Stanford)
- National anthem: Elks Band of Pasadena
- Referee: Ed Thorp; Walter Eckersall (Head linesman)
- Halftime show: Stanford Band
- Attendance: 53,000

The 1925 Rose Bowl was a college football bowl game. It was the 11th Rose Bowl Game. The Notre Dame Fighting Irish defeated Stanford University, 27–10. The game featured two legendary coaches, Knute Rockne of Notre Dame, and Pop Warner in his first year at Stanford. The game also featured the Four Horsemen of Notre Dame. Elmer Layden of Notre Dame and Ernie Nevers of Stanford were named the Rose Bowl Players Of The Game when the award was created in 1953 and selections were made retroactively.

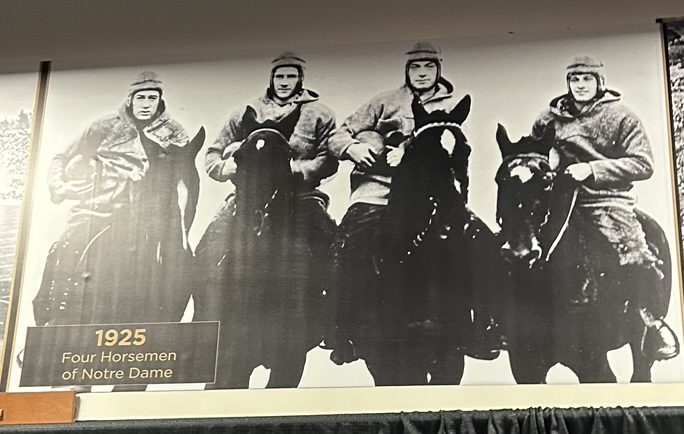
The Four Horseman, displayed in Rose Bowl stadium

This was the first appearance for Notre Dame in any post season bowl game. It was the second appearance for Stanford in a bowl game, since their appearance in the First Tournament East West football game, later known as the 1902 Rose Bowl. This was the first appearance of the Notre Dame football team on the West Coast, the start of the Notre Dame–Stanford rivalry, and eventually led to the founding of the Notre Dame – USC rivalry. This game marked the first time a wirephoto, known at the time as a "telepix", was transmitted of a bowl game.

== Teams ==
=== Stanford University ===
At the time, the Pacific Coast Conference (PCC) teams played a very limited conference schedule. Teams played from three to five conference opponents in an eight-game schedule. Stanford defeated Occidental and had a narrow 7–0 win against Olympic Club. They defeated Oregon, 28–13, in their opening PCC conference game. A 3–0 victory over Idaho in Portland, Oregon was their last close game. Then they beat Montana, 41–3, to run their PCC record to 3–0. Stanford and California met in one of the biggest of the Big Games in 1924. Both teams were undefeated with the PCC championship on the line. Stanford was 3–0, and Cal was 2–0–1. Thousands packed Tightwad Hill above a sold out California Memorial Stadium. The game ended in a 20–20 tie.

=== Notre Dame Fighting Irish ===
Elmer Layden intercepts an Ernie Nevers pass

Notre Dame garnered interest from the Rose Bowl committee to play a PCC opponent for the 1925 football season. Rockne and the Notre Dame administration realized how lucrative an annual trip to Los Angeles would be for the football program. Notre Dame's west coast alumni began lobbying Rockne to bring the team to the Rose Bowl as a season finale on a yearly basis. The Rose Bowl committee favored this arrangement; at the time there was no tie in with the Big Ten Conference. However, the PCC had reservations. Specifically, two members schools, Stanford University and the University of California refused to play Notre Dame "on account of Notre Dame's low scholastic standards. Since Notre Dame was a Catholic school, its academics were considered inferior at the time. USC's coach, Gus Henderson reached out to Rockne through correspondence stating that "USC would welcome the chance to play Notre Dame New Year's Day in Pasadena. While Rockne favored playing USC, Stanford, which won the PCC title, had first choice and eventually realized that playing Notre Dame would be lucrative, and the two played in the 1925 Rose Bowl.

Quarterback Harry Stuhldreher, left halfback Jim Crowley, right halfback Don Miller and fullback Elmer Layden had run rampant through Irish opponents' defenses since coach Knute Rockne devised the lineup in 1922 during their sophomore season. A legendary quote from Grantland Rice, a sportswriter for the former New York Herald Tribune, gave them football immortality. After Notre Dame's 13–7 upset victory over a strong Army team, on October 18, 1924, Rice penned a famous passage of sports journalism:

Outlined against a blue-gray October sky, the Four Horsemen rode again. In dramatic lore they are known as famine, pestilence, destruction and death. These are only aliases. Their real names are: Stuhldreher, Miller, Crowley and Layden. They formed the crest of the South Bend cyclone before which another fighting Army team was swept over the precipice at the Polo Grounds this afternoon as 55,000 spectators peered down upon the bewildering panorama spread out upon the green plain below.

Notre Dame would later notch its 200th victory in a 34–3 win over Georgia Tech in the homecoming game on November 1. Their only other close game would come against Northwestern at Soldier Field on November 22, where the Irish won 13–6.

== Game summary ==
Three Irish touchdowns were scored on Stanford turnovers. Stanford had eight, which proved to be the difference, as they otherwise dominated the Fighting Irish. Elmer Layden scored three touchdowns for Notre Dame, one on a three-yard run in the second quarter to give Notre Dame a 6–3 lead and two more on interception returns. Ernie Nevers, an All-American two-way star for Stanford, played all 60 minutes in the game. He rushed for 114 yards, more yardage than all the Four Horsemen combined.

== Scoring ==
=== First quarter ===
- Stanford – Cuddeback 27-yard field goal 1 8:00 0–3

=== Second quarter ===
- Notre Dame – Layden 3-yard run (kick failed) 2 13:30 6–3
- Notre Dame – Layden 78-yard interception return (Crowley kick) 2 8:00 13–3

=== Third quarter ===
- Notre Dame – Hunsinger 20-yard fumble return (Crowley kick) 3 5:00 20–3
- Stanford – Shipkey 7-yard pass from Walker (Cuddeback kick) 3 1:00 20–10

=== Fourth quarter ===
- Notre Dame – Layden 70-yard interception return (Crowley kick) 4:30 27–10

== Aftermath ==
The next year, the USC invited Notre Dame to a home-and-home series, which was the beginning of the Notre Dame–USC football rivalry. Previously, the furthest west the Irish ever had traveled was to play at Nebraska and Kansas. Dillon Hall, a dormitory at the University of Notre Dame, was built with the proceeds, $52,000, from the 1925 Rose Bowl.

Elmer Layden of Notre Dame and Ernie Nevers of Stanford were named the Rose Bowl Players of the Game when the award was created in 1953 and selections were made retroactively.

This was Notre Dame's last Rose Bowl appearance for almost 100 years, and the team did not appear in any bowl game until the 1970 Cotton Bowl Classic. In 2007, the UCLA Bruins hosted the Notre Dame Fighting Irish in the Rose Bowl stadium where the Irish won, 20–6. With the Rose Bowl Game joining the Bowl Championship Series, the possibility has existed that Notre Dame could again play in the Rose Bowl game. In 2020, Notre Dame qualified for the College Football Playoff and lost to Alabama in the 2021 Rose Bowl, which was moved from Pasadena to Arlington, Texas due to the COVID-19 pandemic, by a score of 31–14.

Rockne died in a plane crash in 1931. Don Miller, who died in 1979 as the last of the living Four Horsemen, said that the 1925 Rose Bowl champion team was Rockne's favorite team.

The Notre Dame–Stanford football rivalry game is now one of the many Notre Dame Fighting Irish football rivalries. The teams next played each other in 1942 and again in 1963 and 1964. The modern series began in 1988 has been played annually except in 1995 and 1996. As of 2021, Notre Dame leads the series, 21–13. When the game is played at Stanford Stadium, it is usually the last game on Stanford's schedule (as has been the case since 1999), one week after the Cardinal plays archrival California in the Big Game.
