= Four Horsemen (American football) =

1920s group of University of Notre Dame football players

The Four Horsemen of Notre Dame: Don Miller, Elmer Layden, Jim Crowley, and Harry Stuhldreher

The Four Horsemen of Notre Dame was a group of American football players at the University of Notre Dame under coach Knute Rockne. They were the backfield of Notre Dame's 1924 football team. The players who made up this group were Harry Stuhldreher, Don Miller, Jim Crowley, and Elmer Layden.

In 1924, a nickname coined by sportswriter Grantland Rice for the New York Herald Tribune and the actions of a student publicity aide transformed the Notre Dame backfield of Stuhldreher, Crowley, Miller, and Layden into one of the most noted groups of collegiate athletes in football history, the Four Horsemen of Notre Dame.

Quarterback Harry Stuhldreher, left halfback Jim Crowley, right halfback Don Miller, and fullback Elmer Layden had run successfully through Irish opponents' defenses since coach Knute Rockne devised the lineup in 1922 during their sophomore season. During the three-year tenure of the Four Horsemen, Notre Dame lost only two games, one each in 1922 and 1923, both to Nebraska in Lincoln before packed houses.

== Naming ==
Grantland Rice gave the foursome its nickname after Notre Dame's 13–7 upset victory over a strong Army team on October 18, 1924. Rice had penned what sports journalist Murray Sperber called "the most famous football lead of all-time":

Outlined against a blue-gray October sky the Four Horsemen rode again. In dramatic lore they are known as famine, pestilence, destruction and death. These are only aliases. Their real names are: Stuhldreher, Miller, Crowley and Layden. They formed the crest of the South Bend cyclone before which another fighting Army team was swept over the precipice at the Polo Grounds this afternoon as 55,000 spectators peered down upon the bewildering panorama spread out upon the green plain below.

— Grantland Rice, October 18, 1924

George Strickler, then Rockne's student publicity aide and later sports editor of the Chicago Tribune, made sure the name stuck. He had pitched the idea out loud at the halftime of the Army game in the press box as a tie in to the 1921 Rudolph Valentino movie The Four Horsemen of the Apocalypse. After the team arrived back in South Bend, he posed the four players, dressed in their uniforms, on the backs of four horses from a livery stable in town. The wire services picked up the now-famous photo, and the legendary status of the Four Horsemen was assured.

"At the time, I didn't realize the impact it would have," Crowley said later. "But the thing just mushroomed. After the splurge in the press, the sports fans of the nation got interested in us along with other sportswriters. Our record helped, too. If we'd lost a couple. I don't think we would have been remembered."

After that win over Army, Notre Dame's third straight victory of the young season, the Irish were rarely threatened the rest of the year. A 27–10 win over Stanford in the 1925 Rose Bowl gave Rockne and Notre Dame the national championship and a 10–0 record.

Although none of the four stood taller than six feet or weighed more than 162 pounds, they played 30 games as a unit and lost only to one team, Nebraska, twice. They played at a time when there were no separate offensive and defensive teams. All players had to play both sides. Once a player left the field, he could not come back into the game.

== Backgrounds ==
Stuhldreher, a 5'7", 151-pounder from Massillon, Ohio, was a self-assured leader who could throw accurately, return punts, and block. He emerged as the starting signal caller four games into his sophomore season in 1922.

Crowley, who came to Notre Dame in 1921 from Green Bay, Wisconsin, stood 5'11" and weighed 162 pounds. Known as "Sleepy Jim" for his drowsy-eyed appearance, Crowley outmaneuvered many defenders with his shifty ball carrying.

Miller, a native of Defiance, Ohio, followed his three brothers to Notre Dame. At 5'11", 160 pounds, he proved to be the team's breakaway threat. According to Rockne, Miller was the greatest open-field runner he ever coached.

Layden, the fastest of the quartet, became the Irish defensive star with his timely interceptions and effective punting. The 6-foot, 162-pounder from Davenport, Iowa, boasted excellent speed in the 40-yard dash.

== Later lives ==
After graduation, the lives of the Four Horsemen took similar paths. All began coaching careers, with three of the four occupying top positions. As players, the four reunited for one game for the Hartford Blues in 1925 (Stuldreher was already playing for the team that year); the Blues, however, lost 13–6 to the Cleveland Bulldogs. Two of the four, Layden and Stuhldreher, were the namesakes of the professional Brooklyn Horsemen team for whom they played in 1926.

Layden coached at his alma mater for seven years and compiled a 47–13–3 record. He also served as athletic director at Notre Dame and later as commissioner of the National Football League. After a business career in Chicago, Layden died in 1973 at the age of 70.

Crowley started as an assistant coach at the University of Georgia. He quickly moved to head coaching positions at Michigan State University and Fordham University, where his famed line, the "Seven Blocks of Granite," included Vince Lombardi. His Fordham teams played in the Cotton Bowl Classic and Sugar Bowl. His overall record was 78–21–10. Crowley also served as commissioner of the All-America Football Conference. He later entered business in Scranton, Pennsylvania. The last surviving Horseman, Crowley died in 1986 at the age of 83.

Stuhldreher, who died in 1965 at the age of 63, was the head football coach for 11 years at Villanova University, then became athletic director and football coach at the University of Wisconsin–Madison. He later worked for U.S. Steel.

Miller left coaching after four years each at Georgia Tech and The Ohio State University. He began practicing law in Cleveland. He was appointed U.S. District Attorney for Northern Ohio by President Franklin D. Roosevelt. Miller died in 1979 at the age of 77.

All four players were elected to the College Football Hall of Fame — Layden in 1951, Stuhldreher in 1958, Crowley in 1966, and Miller in 1970. In 1998, the United States Postal Service honored the Four Horsemen with a stamp as part of 15 commemorative postage stamps saluting "The Roaring Twenties", which was part of their Celebrate the Century stamp sheet series.

== The Seven Mules ==
After Rice nicknamed the so-called Horsemen, the Notre Dame line was identified as the "Seven Mules" to emphasize their crucial but less glamorous function. Two members of the line are also in the College Football Hall of Fame. Adam Walsh, from Hollywood, California, was the starting center and team captain. In later years, he coached at Santa Clara University and Bowdoin College and for the Cleveland/Los Angeles Rams. Walsh died in 1985. Edgar Miller was a tackle from Canton, Ohio. He later coached at the United States Naval Academy and died in 1991. Thus, a total of six members of the 1924 Notre Dame team have been elected to the College Football Hall of Fame. Yet another of the "Mules" was Joe Bach who went on to a coaching career that included two stints as head coach of the Pittsburgh Pirates/Steelers. Another of the Mules was George Vergara, who later played for the Green Bay Packers until his career ended with a neck injury. Later he became the Mayor of New Rochelle, New York.

== Bibliography ==
- Full text of Grantland Rice article from University of Notre Dame archives.
- Loyal Sons: The Story of the Four Horsemen and Notre Dame Football's 1924 Champions

== Sources ==
- When Pride Still Mattered, A Life of Vince Lombardi, by David Maraniss, 1999, (ISBN 0-684-84418-4) ISBN 978-0-618-90499-0
