= 1924 Tennessee State football team =

American college football season

1924 Tennessee State football
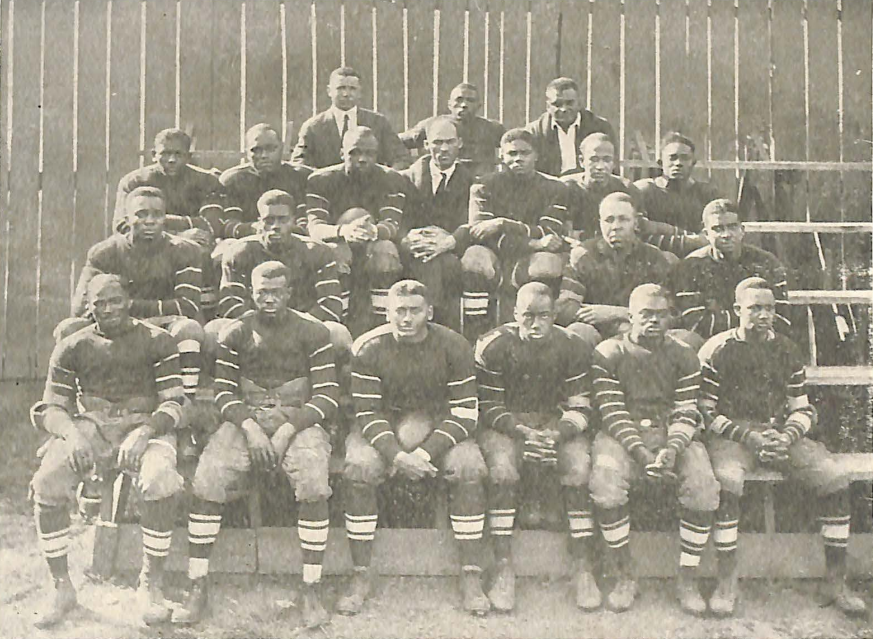
- Conference: Independent
- Record: 4–1–1
- Head coach: Joe E. Suggs (1st season)
- Captain: Guy E. Hoffman
- Home stadium: Athletic Park

1924 Southern college football independents records
	Conf.			Overall
Team	W	L	T	W		L		T
Stetson		–		6	–	0	–	0
Quantico Marines		–		7	–	0	–	1
Tennessee Docs		–		9	–	1	–	0
Centenary		–		8	–	1	–	0
West Virginia		–		8	–	1	–	0
West Virginia Wesleyan		–		9	–	2	–	0
Davidson		–		7	–	2	–	1
Wake Forest		–		7	–	2	–	0
George Washington		–		6	–	3	–	1
William & Mary		–		5	–	2	–	1
Delaware		–		4	–	3	–	1
Texas Mines		–		3	–	2	–	1
Mississippi State Teachers		–		3	–	3	–	2
Birmingham–Southern		–		4	–	4	–	1
Spring Hill		–		4	–	4	–	1
Georgetown		–		4	–	4	–	0
Marshall		–		4	–	4	–	0
Duke		–		4	–	5	–	0
Western Kentucky State Normal		–		4	–	5	–	0
East Tennessee State Normal		–		3	–	4	–	1
Loyola (LA)		–		3	–	4	–	2
Abilene Christian		–		3	–	4	–	2
Louisville		–		3	–	5	–	1
Georgia Normal		–		1	–	2	–	0
Southwestern		–		3	–	6	–	0
Union (TN)		–		3	–	6	–	0
Richmond		–		2	–	6	–	1
Catholic University		–		1	–	5	–	2
Navy		–		2	–	6	–	0
Middle Tennessee State Normal		–		1	–	5	–	0
West Tennessee State Normal		–		1	–	7	–	1
Delaware State		–		0	–	1	–	0

The 1924 Tennessee State football team represented the Tennessee Agricultural & Industrial State Normal School for Negroes—now known as Tennessee State University—an independent during the 1924 college football season. Led by Joe E. Suggs in his first and only season as head coach, Tennessee State compiled a record of 4–1–1.

Suggs had starred in football at Fisk University, and had graduated from the coaching school at the University of Illinois before being hired by Tennessee State.

== Schedule ==
Date	Time	Opponent	Site	Result	Source
October 18		vs. Morehouse	Chattanooga, TN	L 0–1 (forfeit)	
October 25		Walden (TN)	Athletic Park; Nashville, TN	W 60–0	
November 1	2:30 p.m.	vs. Rust	Lewis Park; Memphis, TN	W 61–0	
November 7		Knoxville	Athletic Park; Nashville, TN	W 13–6	
November 15		at Morris Brown	Atlanta, GA	W 10–0	
November 27		at Simmons (KY)	Louisville, KY	T 0–0	
All times are in Central time
