= 1924 Southern Conference football season =

- League: NCAA
- Sport: College football
- Duration: September 20, 1924 through December 6, 1924
- Number of teams: 22

Regular Season
- Season champions: Alabama

Football seasons
- ← 1923 1925 →

1924 Southern Conference football standings
	Conf.					Overall
Team	W		L		T	W		L		T
Alabama $	5	–	0	–	0	8	–	1	–	0
Florida	2	–	0	–	1	6	–	2	–	2
Georgia	5	–	1	–	0	7	–	3	–	0
Tulane	4	–	1	–	0	8	–	1	–	0
Washington and Lee	4	–	1	–	1	6	–	3	–	1
South Carolina	3	–	2	–	0	7	–	3	–	0
Sewanee *	3	–	2	–	0	6	–	4	–	0
Mississippi A&M	3	–	2	–	0	5	–	4	–	0
Virginia	3	–	2	–	0	5	–	4	–	0
Georgia Tech	3	–	2	–	1	5	–	3	–	1
Vanderbilt *	3	–	3	–	0	6	–	3	–	1
VPI	2	–	2	–	3	4	–	2	–	3
VMI	2	–	3	–	1	6	–	3	–	1
Kentucky	2	–	3	–	0	4	–	5	–	0
North Carolina	2	–	3	–	0	4	–	5	–	0
Auburn	2	–	4	–	1	4	–	4	–	1
Maryland	1	–	2	–	1	3	–	3	–	3
NC State	1	–	4	–	1	2	–	4	–	2
LSU	0	–	3	–	0	5	–	4	–	0
Ole Miss	0	–	3	–	0	4	–	5	–	0
Clemson	0	–	3	–	0	2	–	6	–	0
Tennessee	0	–	4	–	0	3	–	5	–	0
$ – Conference champion; * – co-member of SIAA

The 1924 Southern Conference football season was the college football games played by the member schools of the Southern Conference as part of the 1924 college football season. The season began on September 20. Sewanee and VMI joined the conference this year. Vanderbilt dropped its comembership with the Southern Intercollegiate Athletic Association (SIAA).

Alabama was awarded the Champ Pickens Trophy as conference champion, though the loss to Centre hindered any claims of a championship of the South.

Vanderbilt end Hek Wakefield was a second-team Walter Camp All-American.

== Season overview ==
=== Results and team statistics ===
Conf. Rank	Team	Head coach	Overall record	Conf. record	PPG	PAG
1	Alabama	Wallace Wade	8–1	5–0	**32.2**	2.7
2	Florida	James Van Fleet	6–2–2	2–0–1	21.1	4.4
3	Georgia	Kid Woodruff	7–3	5–1	12.9	6.1
4	Tulane	Clark Shaughnessy	8–1	4–1	22.3	6.6
5	Washington and Lee	James DeHart	6–3–1	4–1–1	16.3	6.0
6 (tie)	South Carolina	Sol Metzger	7–3	3–2	12.0	4.8
6 (tie)	Sewanee	M. S. Bennett	5–3	3–2	8.1	4.7
6 (tie)	Mississippi A&M	Earl Abell	5–4	3–2	9.1	10.0
6 (tie)	Virginia	Greasy Neale	5–4	3–2	8.0	9.2
10	Georgia Tech	William Alexander	5–3–1	3–2–1	9.1	8.7
11	Vanderbilt	Dan McGugin	6–3–1	3–3	15.0	5.3
12	VPI	Ben Cubbage	4–2–3	2–2–3	11.4	**2.0**
13	VMI	Blandy Clarkson	6–3–1	2–3–1	15.2	2.9
14 (tie)	Kentucky	Fred Murphy	4–5	2–3	14.3	11.0
14 (tie)	North Carolina	Bob Fetzer/Bill Fetzer	4–5	2–3	4.2	6.3
16	Auburn	Boozer Pitts	4–4–1	2–4–1	5.1	4.4
17	Maryland	Curley Byrd	3–3–3	1–2–1	8.2	8.7
18	NC State	Buck Shaw	2–6–2	1–4–1	4.3	14.7
19 (tie)	LSU	Mike Donahue	3–5–1	0–3	13.8	9.0
19 (tie)	Ole Miss	Chester S. Barnard	4–6	0–3	4.0	15.8
19 (tie)	Clemson	Bud Saunders	2–6	0–3	10.4	16.9
22	Tennessee	M. B. Banks	3–5	0–4	10.0	12.0

Key

PPG = Average of points scored per game
PAG = Average of points allowed per game

=== Regular season ===
Index to colors and formatting
Non-conference matchup; SoCon member won
Non-conference matchup; SoCon member lost
Non-conference matchup; tie
Conference matchup

SoCon teams in bold.

==== Week One ====
Date	Visiting team	Home team	Site	Result	Attendance	Reference
September 20	Transylvania	**Sewanee**	McGee Field • Sewanee, Tennessee	**W** 27–0		
September 20	Wofford	**VMI**	Lexington, Virginia	**W** 33–0		

==== Week Two ====
Date	Visiting team	Home team	Site	Result	Attendance	Reference
September 27	Union (TN)	**Alabama**	Denny Field • Tuscaloosa, Alabama	**W** 55–0		
September 27	**Auburn**	Birmingham–Southern	Rickwood Field • Birmingham, Alabama	**W** 7–0		
September 27	Elon	**Clemson**	Riggs Field • Calhoun, South Carolina	**W** 60–0		
September 27	Mercer	**Georgia**	Sanford Field • Athens, Georgia	**W** 26–7		
September 27	Oglethorpe	**Georgia Tech**	Grant Field • Atlanta	**W** 19–0		
September 27	Spring Hill	**LSU**	State Field • Baton Rouge, Louisiana	**W** 7–6		
September 27	Washington (MD)	**Maryland**	Byrd Stadium • College Park, Maryland	**W** 23–0		
September 27	Duke	**North Carolina State**	Riddick Stadium • Raleigh, North Carolina	**W** 14–0		
September 27	Rhodes	**Sewanee**	McGee Field • Sewanee, Tennessee	**W** 7–0		
September 27	Erskine	**South Carolina**	Columbia, South Carolina	**W** 47–0		
September 27	Louisiana-Lafayette	**Tulane**	Second Tulane Stadium • New Orleans, Louisiana	**W** 14–0		
September 27	Henderson-Brown	**Vanderbilt**	Dudley Field • Nashville, Tennessee	**W** 13–0		
September 27	Hampden-Sydney	**Virginia**	Lambeth Field • Charlottesville, Virginia	**W** 13–9		
September 27	Emory & Henry	**VMI**	Lexington, Virginia	**W** 39–0		
September 27	Richmond	**Virginia Tech**	Blacksburg, Virginia	**W** 28–0		
September 27	Roanoke	**Washington & Lee**	Wilson Field • Lexington, Virginia	**W** 34–0		

==== Week Three ====
Date	Visiting team	Home team	Site	Result	Attendance	Reference
October 4	**Alabama**	Furman	Manly Field • Greenville, South Carolina	**W** 20–0		
October 4	**Clemson**	**Auburn**	Drake Field • Auburn, Alabama	**AUB** 13–0		
October 4	Rollins	**Florida**	Fleming Field • Gainesville, Florida	**W** 77–0		
October 4	**South Carolina**	**Georgia**	Sanford Field • Athens, Georgia	**UGA** 18–0		
October 4	**VMI**	**Georgia Tech**	Grant Field • Atlanta	**GT** 3–0		
October 4	Louisville	**Kentucky**	Stoll Field • Lexington, Kentucky	**W** 29–0		
October 4	Louisiana-Lafayette	**LSU**	State Field • Baton Rouge, Louisiana	**W** 31–7		
October 4	Arkansas State	**Ole Miss**	Hemingway Stadium • Oxford, Mississippi	**W** 10–7		
October 4	Millsaps	**Mississippi A&M**	Davis Wade Stadium • Starkville, Mississippi	**W** 28–7		
October 4	**North Carolina**	Yale	Yale Bowl • New Haven, Connecticut	**L** 27–0		
October 4	**North Carolina State**	Penn State	New Beaver Field • University Park, Pennsylvania	**L** 51–6		
October 4	Emory & Henry	**Tennessee**	Shields–Watkins Field • Knoxville, Tennessee	**W** 27–0		
October 4	Mississippi College	**Tulane**	Second Tulane Stadium • New Orleans	**W** 32–7		
October 4	Birmingham–Southern	**Vanderbilt**	Dudley Field • Nashville, Tennessee	**W** 61–0		
October 4	**Virginia**	Harvard	Harvard Stadium • Boston, Massachusetts	**L** 14–0		
October 4	Hampden-Sydney	**Virginia Tech**	Blacksburg, Virginia	**W** 10–0		
October 4	**Maryland**	**Washington & Lee**	Washington, D. C.	**W&L** 19–7		

==== Week Four ====
Date	Visiting team	Home team	Site	Result	Attendance	Reference
October 11	Mississippi College	**Alabama**	Denny Field • Tuscaloosa, Alabama	**W** 51–0		
October 11	**Auburn**	**Virginia Tech**	Richmond, Virginia	**T** 0–0		
October 11	Presbyterian	**Clemson**	Riggs Field • Calhoun, South Carolina	**W** 14–0		
October 11	**Florida**	**Georgia Tech**	Grant Field • Atlanta	**T** 7–7		
October 11	**Georgia**	Yale	Yale Bowl • New Haven, Connecticut	**L** 7–6		
October 11	Georgetown (KY)	**Kentucky**	Stoll Field • Lexington, Kentucky	**W** 42–0		
October 11	**LSU**	Indiana	Indianapolis	**W** 20–14		
October 11	Rhodes	**Ole Miss**	Hemingway Stadium • Oxford, Mississippi	**W** 7–0		
October 11	Ouachita	**Mississippi A&M**	Davis Wade Stadium • Starkville, Mississippi	**L** 12–0		
October 11	Duke	**North Carolina**	Emerson Field • Chapel Hill, North Carolina	**W** 6–0		
October 11	**North Carolina State**	**South Carolina**	Columbia, South Carolina	**SCAR** 10–0		
October 11	**Sewanee**	Texas A&M	Dallas, Texas	**L** 7–0		
October 11	Maryville	**Tennessee**	Shields–Watkins Field • Knoxville, Tennessee	**W** 28–10		
October 11	Louisiana Tech	**Tulane**	Second Tulane Stadium • New Orleans	**W** 42–12		
October 11	Quantico Marines	**Vanderbilt**	Dudley Field • Nashville, Tennessee	**T** 13–13	16,000	
October 11	Randolph-Macon	**Virginia**	Lambeth Field • Charlottesville, Virginia	**W** 26–6		
October 11	Roanoke	**VMI**	Lexington, Virginia	**W** 28–0		
October 11	Wake Forest	**Washington & Lee**	Wilson Field • Lexington, Virginia	**L** 10–8		

==== Week Five ====
Date	Visiting team	Home team	Site	Result	Attendance	Reference
October 16	**North Carolina**	**North Carolina State**	Riddick Stadium • Raleigh, North Carolina	**UNC** 10–0		
October 17	Presbyterian	**South Carolina**	Columbia, South Carolina	**W** 29–0		
October 18	**Sewanee**	**Alabama**	Rickwood Field • Birmingham, Alabama	**ALA** 14–0		
October 18	Howard	**Auburn**	Drake Field • Auburn, Alabama	**W** 17–0		
October 18	Wake Forest	**Florida**	Plant Field • Tampa, Florida	**W** 34–0		
October 18	Furman	**Georgia**	Augusta, Georgia	**W** 23–0		
October 18	Penn State	**Georgia Tech**	Grant Field • Atlanta	**W** 15–13		
October 18	**LSU**	Rice	Houston	**W** 12–0		
October 18	**Virginia Tech**	**Maryland**	Washington, D. C.	**VT** 12–0		
October 18	**Ole Miss**	**Mississippi A&M**	Jackson, Mississippi	**MSA&M** 20–0		
October 18	Carson-Newman	**Tennessee**	Shields–Watkins Field • Knoxville, Tennessee	**W** 13–0		
October 18	**Vanderbilt**	**Tulane**	Second Tulane Stadium • New Orleans	**TUL** 21–13	13,000	
October 18	**VMI**	**Virginia**	Lambeth Field • Charlottesville, Virginia	**UVA** 13–0		
October 18	**Washington & Lee**	**Kentucky**	Stoll Field • Lexington, Kentucky	**W&L** 10–7		

==== Week Six ====
Date	Visiting team	Home team	Site	Result	Attendance	Reference
October 23	**Clemson**	**South Carolina**	Columbia, South Carolina	**SCAR** 3–0		
October 25	**Alabama**	**Georgia Tech**	Grant Field • Atlanta	**ALA** 14–0		
October 25	**LSU**	**Auburn**	Rickwood Field • Birmingham, Alabama	**AUB** 3–0		
October 25	**Florida**	Texas	Clark Field • Austin, Texas	**T** 7–7		
October 25	**Sewanee**	**Kentucky**	Stoll Field • Lexington, Kentucky	**UK** 7–0		
October 25	**Maryland**	**North Carolina**	Emerson Field • Chapel Hill, North Carolina	**MD** 6–0		
October 25	**Ole Miss**	Arkansas	Kavanaugh Field • Little Rock, Arkansas	**L** 20–0		
October 25	**Mississippi A&M**	**Tennessee**	Memphis, Tennessee	**MSA&M** 7–2		
October 25	Spring Hill	**Tulane**	Second Tulane Stadium • New Orleans, Louisiana	**W** 33–0		
October 25	**Georgia**	**Vanderbilt**	Dudley Field • Nashville, Tennessee	**UGA** 3–0		
October 25	**Virginia**	Penn	Franklin Field • Philadelphia	**L** 27–0		
October 25	**North Carolina State**	**VMI**	Richmond, Virginia	**VMI** 17–7		
October 25	**Virginia Tech**	**Washington & Lee**	Lynchburg, Virginia	**T** 0–0		

==== Week Seven ====
Date	Visiting team	Home team	Site	Result	Attendance	Reference
October 29	**South Carolina**	The Citadel	County Fairgrounds • Orangeburg, South Carolina	**W** 14–3		
November 1	**Ole Miss**	**Alabama**	Montgomery, Alabama	**ALA** 61–0		
November 1	**Tennessee**	**Georgia**	Sanford Field • Athens, Georgia	**UGA** 33–0		
November 1	Florida Southern	**Florida**	Fleming Field • Gainesville, Florida	**W** 26–0		
November 1	**Georgia Tech**	Notre Dame	South Bend, Indiana	**L** 34–3		
November 1	Centre	**Kentucky**	Stoll Field • Lexington, Kentucky	**L** 7–0		
November 1	**LSU**	Arkansas	Fair Grounds Field • Shreveport, Louisiana	**L** 10–7		
November 1	Catholic	**Maryland**	Byrd Stadium • College Park, Maryland	**T** 0–0		
November 1	Davidson	**North Carolina State**	Pinehurst, North Carolina	**T** 10–10		
November 1	**Sewanee**	Oglethorpe		**L** 7–0		
November 1	**South Carolina**	**North Carolina**	Emerson Field • Chapel Hill, North Carolina	**SCAR** 10–7		
November 1	**Mississippi A&M**	**Tulane**	Second Tulane Stadium • New Orleans, Louisiana	**MSA&M** 14–6		
November 1	**Auburn**	**Vanderbilt**	Dudley Field • Nashville, Tennessee	**VAN** 13–0		
November 1	**Virginia Tech**	**Clemson**	Riggs Field • Calhoun, South Carolina	**VT** 50–6		
November 1	**Washington & Lee**	**Virginia**	Lambeth Field • Charlottesville, Virginia	**W&L** 20–7		

==== Week Eight ====
Date	Visiting team	Home team	Site	Result	Attendance	Reference
November 8	**Kentucky**	**Alabama**	Denny Field • Tuscaloosa, Alabama	**ALA** 42–7		
November 8	**Tulane**	**Auburn**	Montgomery, Alabama	**TUL** 14–6		
November 8	**Clemson**	Davidson	Charlotte, North Carolina	**L** 7–0		
November 8	**Florida**	Army	Michie Stadium • West Point, New York	**L** 14–7		
November 8	**Georgia**	**Virginia**	Lambeth Field • Charlottesville, Virginia	**UGA** 7–0		
November 8	**LSU**	**Georgia Tech**	Grant Field • Atlanta	**GT** 28–7		
November 8	**Maryland**	Yale	Yale Bowl • New Haven, Connecticut	**L** 47–0		
November 8	**North Carolina**	**VMI**	Richmond, Virginia	**VMI** 9–0		
November 8	**North Carolina State**	**Virginia Tech**	Norfolk, Virginia	**NCST** 6–3		
November 8	**Ole Miss**	**Sewanee**	Memphis, Tennessee	**SEW** 21–0		
November 8	Furman	**South Carolina**	Columbia, South Carolina	**L** 10–0		
November 8	Centre	**Tennessee**	Shields–Watkins Field • Knoxville, Tennessee	**L** 32–0		
November 8	**Mississippi A&M**	**Vanderbilt**	Dudley Field • Nashville, Tennessee	**VAN** 18–0		
November 8	The Citadel	**Washington & Lee**	Wilson Field • Lexington, Virginia	**W** 32–7		

==== Week Nine ====
Date	Visiting team	Home team	Site	Result	Attendance	Reference
November 14	**Florida**	Mercer	Macon, Georgia	**L** 10–0		
November 15	Centre	**Alabama**	Rickwood Field • Birmingham, Alabama	**L** 17–0		
November 15	**Georgia**	**Auburn**	McClung Stadium • Columbus, Georgia	**UGA** 6–0		
November 15	**Clemson**	The Citadel	Anderson, South Carolina	**L** 20–0		
November 17	**Florida**	Florida-Southern	Lakeland, Florida	**W** 53–0		
November 17	**Georgia Tech**	**Kentucky**	Stoll Field • Lexington, Kentucky	**T** 3–3		
November 15	Northwestern State	**LSU**	State Field • Baton Rouge, Louisiana	**W** 40–0		
November 15	Mississippi College	**Mississippi A&M**	Davis Wade Stadium • Starkville, Mississippi	**W** 7–6		
November 15	**Maryland**	**North Carolina State**	Riddick Stadium • Raleigh, North Carolina	**T** 0–0		
November 15	**North Carolina**	Davidson	Davidson, North Carolina	**W** 6–0		
November 15	**Ole Miss**	Furman	Manly Field • Greenville, South Carolina	**L** 7–2		
November 15	**Sewanee**	**South Carolina**	Columbia, South Carolina	**SEW** 10–0		
November 15	**Tennessee**	**Tulane**	Second Tulane Stadium • New Orleans, Louisiana	**TUL** 26–7		
November 15	**Vanderbilt**	**Georgia Tech**	Grant Field • Atlanta	**VAN** 3–0		
November 15	**Virginia Tech**	**Virginia**	Lambeth Field • Charlottesville, Virginia	**UVA** 6–0		
November 15	**Washington & Lee**	West Virginia	Charleston, West Virginia	**L** 6–0		

==== Week Ten ====
Date	Visiting team	Home team	Site	Result	Attendance	Reference
November 22	**Mississippi A&M**	**Florida**	Cramton Bowl • Montgomery, Alabama	**FLA** 27–0		
November 22	Mississippi College	**Ole Miss**	Hemingway Stadium • Oxford, Mississippi	**W** 10–6		
November 22	**Vanderbilt**	Minnesota	Memorial Stadium • Minneapolis	**W** 16–0	23,000	
November 22	Hampden-Sydney	**VMI**	Lexington, Virginia	**W** 25–0		
November 22	Wake Forest	**North Carolina State**	Riddick Stadium • Raleigh, North Carolina	**L** 12–0		

==== Week Eleven ====
Date	Visiting team	Home team	Site	Result	Attendance	Reference
November 27	**Georgia**	**Alabama**	Rickwood Field • Birmingham, Alabama	**ALA** 33–0		
November 27	**Auburn**	**Georgia Tech**	Grant Field • Atlanta	**GT** 7–0		
November 27	Furman	**Clemson**	Riggs Field • Calhoun, South Carolina	**L** 3–0		
November 27	Drake	**Florida**	Fleming Field • Gainesville, Florida	**W** 10–0		
November 27	**Maryland**	Johns Hopkins	Baltimore	**T** 0–0		
November 27	**Ole Miss**	Millsaps	Jackson, Mississippi	**W** 7–0		
November 27	**North Carolina**	**Virginia**	Lambeth Field • Charlottesville, Virginia	**UVA** 7–0		
November 27	**Kentucky**	**Tennessee**	Shields–Watkins Field • Knoxville, Tennessee	**UK** 27–6		
November 27	Wake Forest	**South Carolina**	Columbia, South Carolina	**W** 7–0		
November 27	**Tulane**	**LSU**	Tiger Stadium • Baton Rouge, Louisiana	**TUL** 13–0		
November 27	**VMI**	**Virginia Tech**	Roanoke, Virginia	**T** 0–0		
November 27	**Washington & Lee**	**North Carolina State**	Riddick Stadium • Raleigh, North Carolina	**W&L** 34–0		
November 29	**Georgia**	Centre	Danville, Kentucky	**L** 14–7		
November 29	**Sewanee**	**Vanderbilt**	Dudley Field • Nashville, Tennessee	**SEW** 16–0		

==== Week Twelve ====
Date	Visiting team	Home team	Site	Result	Attendance	Reference
December 6	**Washington & Lee**	**Florida**	Barrs Field • Jacksonville, Florida	**FLA** 16–6		
December 6	**Kentucky**	West Virginia Wesleyan	Charleston, West Virginia	**L** 24–7		

== Awards and honors ==
=== All-Americans ===
- E – Henry "Hek" Wakefield, Vanderbilt (WC-2; INS; NEA; LP-1; BE-1; NB-1; DW-1; WE-3; BC)
- T – Jim Taylor, Georgia (NB-3)
- G – Bill Buckler, Alabama (NB-3)
- G – Walt Godwin, Georgia Tech (NB-3)
- C – Clyde Propst, Alabama (LP-2)
- HB – Gil Reese, Vanderbilt (NB-3)
- FB – Doug Wycoff, Georgia Tech (ASM-3; LP-1 [hb]; NB-2; DW-2; WE-3)

=== All-Southern team ===
The following includes the composite All-Southern team compiled by the Atlanta Journal. C2 refers to another composite.

Position	Name	First-team selectors	Team
QB	Edgar C. Jones	AJ, C2	Florida
HB	Pooley Hubert	AJ, C2	Alabama
HB	Gil Reese	AJ, C2	Vanderbilt
FB	Doug Wycoff	AJ, C2	Georgia Tech
E	Hek Wakefield	AJ, C2	Vanderbilt
T	Bob Rives	AJ, C2	Vanderbilt
G	Goldy Goldstein	AJ, C2	Florida
C	Fats Lawrence	AJ, C2	Auburn
C	Clyde Propst	AJ	Alabama
T	Jim Taylor	AJ, C2	Georgia
E	Smack Thompson	AJ, C2	Georgia
