= 1924 Mercer Bears football team =

American college football season

1924 Mercer Bears football
- Conference: Southern Intercollegiate Athletic Association
- Record: 5–3–2 (4–1–1 SIAA)
- Head coach: Stanley L. Robinson (2nd season)
- Home stadium: Alumni Field

1924 Southern Intercollegiate Athletic Association football standings
	Conf.					Overall
Team	W		L		T	W		L		T
Centre +	1	–	0	–	0	5	–	1	–	1
Oglethorpe +	5	–	0	–	0	6	–	3	–	1
Mississippi College	2	–	0	–	1	2	–	5	–	1
Newberry	4	–	1	–	0	8	–	2	–	0
Mercer	4	–	1	–	1	5	–	3	–	2
Sewanee*	2	–	1	–	0	6	–	4	–	0
The Citadel	4	–	2	–	0	6	–	4	–	0
Louisville	2	–	1	–	0	3	–	4	–	1
Millsaps	1	–	1	–	0	3	–	5	–	1
Georgetown (KY)	1	–	1	–	0	1	–	4	–	0
Transylvania	1	–	2	–	0	6	–	2	–	0
Furman	1	–	2	–	0	5	–	5	–	0
Wofford	2	–	4	–	0	3	–	7	–	0
Howard (AL)	1	–	3	–	0	3	–	5	–	1
Presbyterian	1	–	3	–	0	1	–	6	–	1
Vanderbilt*	0	–	1	–	0	6	–	3	–	1
Louisiana College	0	–	1	–	0	0	–	1	–	0
Western Kentucky	0	–	2	–	0	4	–	6	–	0
Erskine	0	–	4	–	0	1	–	7	–	0
Chattanooga	0	–	5	–	0	1	–	7	–	1
+ – Conference co-champions; * – co-member of SoCon

The 1924 Mercer Bears football team was an American football team that represented Mercer University as a member of the Southern Intercollegiate Athletic Association (SIAA) during the 1924 college football season. In their second year under head coach Stanley L. Robinson, the team compiled a 5–3–2 record.

== Schedule ==
Date	Opponent	Site	Result	Attendance	Source
September 27	at Georgia*	Sanford Field; Athens, GA	L 7–26	8,000	
October 4	at Syracuse*	Archbold Stadium; Syracuse, NY	L 0–26	10,000	
October 11	at Furman	Manly Field; Greenville, SC	W 23–0		
October 18	Chattanooga	Alumni Field; Macon, GA	W 33–0	4,500	
October 25	Howard (AL)	Alumni Field; Macon, GA	W 14–5	5,000	
November 1	at Loyola (LA)*	Loyola Stadium; New Orleans, LA	T 0–0		
November 8	Wofford	Alumni Field; Macon, GA	W 16–0	3,000	
November 14	Florida*	Alumni Field; Macon, GA	W 10–0	6,000	
November 22	at Oglethorpe	Spiller Field; Atlanta, GA	L 0–25		
November 27	Mississippi College	Alumni Field; Macon, GA	T 7–7		
*Non-conference game
