= 1924 West Virginia Wesleyan Bobcats football team =

American college football season

1924 West Virginia Wesleyan Bobcats football

Dixie Classic champion

Dixie Classic, W 9–7 vs. SMU
- Conference: Independent
- Record: 9–2
- Head coach: Bob Higgins (4th season)

1924 Southern college football independents records
	Conf.			Overall
Team	W	L	T	W		L		T
Stetson		–		6	–	0	–	0
Quantico Marines		–		7	–	0	–	1
Tennessee Docs		–		9	–	1	–	0
Centenary		–		8	–	1	–	0
West Virginia		–		8	–	1	–	0
West Virginia Wesleyan		–		9	–	2	–	0
Davidson		–		7	–	2	–	1
Wake Forest		–		7	–	2	–	0
George Washington		–		6	–	3	–	1
William & Mary		–		5	–	2	–	1
Delaware		–		4	–	3	–	1
Texas Mines		–		3	–	2	–	1
Mississippi State Teachers		–		3	–	3	–	2
Birmingham–Southern		–		4	–	4	–	1
Spring Hill		–		4	–	4	–	1
Georgetown		–		4	–	4	–	0
Marshall		–		4	–	4	–	0
Duke		–		4	–	5	–	0
Western Kentucky State Normal		–		4	–	5	–	0
East Tennessee State Normal		–		3	–	4	–	1
Loyola (LA)		–		3	–	4	–	2
Abilene Christian		–		3	–	4	–	2
Louisville		–		3	–	5	–	1
Georgia Normal		–		1	–	2	–	0
Southwestern		–		3	–	6	–	0
Union (TN)		–		3	–	6	–	0
Richmond		–		2	–	6	–	1
Catholic University		–		1	–	5	–	2
Navy		–		2	–	6	–	0
Middle Tennessee State Normal		–		1	–	5	–	0
West Tennessee State Normal		–		1	–	7	–	1
Delaware State		–		0	–	1	–	0

The 1924 West Virginia Wesleyan Bobcats football team represented West Virginia Wesleyan College as an independent during the 1924 college football season. In their fourth and final season under head coach Bob Higgins, the Bobcats compiled a 9–2 record and outscored their opponents by a total of 182 to 78. On September 27. West Virginia Wesleyan was defeated by the West Virginia Mountaineers in the first game played at the new Mountaineer Field The Bobcats were invited to the 1925 Dixie Classic, their first and only bowl game appearance in program history, where they defeated SMU, 9 to 7.

== Schedule ==
Date	Opponent	Site	Result	Attendance	Source
September 27	at West Virginia	Mountaineer Field; Morgantown, WV	L 6–21		
October 3	at Broaddus	Buckhannon, WV	W 34–6		
October 10	Salem	Clarksburg, WV	W 41–0		
October 18	at Marietta	Parkersburg, WV	W 20–0		
October 25	at Navy	Thompson Stadium; Annapolis, MD	W 10–7		
November 1	Waynesburg	Clarksburg, WV	L 0–14		
November 8	at Syracuse	Archbold Stadium; Syracuse, NY	W 7–3		
November 22	Bethany (WV)	Clarksburg, WV	W 19–6		
November 27	at Davis & Elkins	Elkins, WV	W 12–7		
December 6	Kentucky	Laidley Field; Charleston, WV	W 24–7		
January 1, 1925	at SMU	Fair Park Stadium; Dallas, TX (Dixie Classic)	W 9–7	7,000	
