= 1924 William & Mary Indians football team =

American college football season

1924 William & Mary Indians football
- Conference: Independent
- Record: 5–2–1
- Head coach: J. Wilder Tasker (2nd season)
- Captain: John Todd

1924 Southern college football independents records
	Conf.			Overall
Team	W	L	T	W		L		T
Stetson		–		6	–	0	–	0
Quantico Marines		–		7	–	0	–	1
Tennessee Docs		–		9	–	1	–	0
Centenary		–		8	–	1	–	0
West Virginia		–		8	–	1	–	0
West Virginia Wesleyan		–		9	–	2	–	0
Davidson		–		7	–	2	–	1
Wake Forest		–		7	–	2	–	0
George Washington		–		6	–	3	–	1
William & Mary		–		5	–	2	–	1
Delaware		–		4	–	3	–	1
Texas Mines		–		3	–	2	–	1
Mississippi State Teachers		–		3	–	3	–	2
Birmingham–Southern		–		4	–	4	–	1
Spring Hill		–		4	–	4	–	1
Georgetown		–		4	–	4	–	0
Marshall		–		4	–	4	–	0
Duke		–		4	–	5	–	0
Western Kentucky State Normal		–		4	–	5	–	0
East Tennessee State Normal		–		3	–	4	–	1
Loyola (LA)		–		3	–	4	–	2
Louisville		–		3	–	5	–	1
Georgia Normal		–		1	–	2	–	0
Southwestern		–		3	–	6	–	0
Union (TN)		–		3	–	6	–	0
Richmond		–		2	–	6	–	1
Catholic University		–		1	–	5	–	2
Navy		–		2	–	6	–	0
Middle Tennessee State Normal		–		1	–	5	–	0
West Tennessee State Normal		–		1	–	7	–	1
Delaware State		–		0	–	1	–	0

The 1924 William & Mary Indians football team represented the College of William & Mary as an independent during the 1924 college football season. Led by second-year head coach J. Wilder Tasker, the Indians compiled a record of 5–2–1.

== Schedule ==
Date	Opponent	Site	Result	Attendance	Source
October 4	at Navy	Thompson Stadium; Annapolis, MD	L 7–14		
October 11	at Syracuse	Archbold Stadium; Syracuse, NY	L 7–24	12,000	
October 18	Randolph–Macon	Williamsburg, VA	W 27–7		
October 25	vs. Duke	League Park; Norfolk, VA	W 21–3		
November 1	vs. King	Richmond, VA	W 27–0		
November 8	Albright	Williamsburg, VA	W 27–0		
November 15	Roanoke	Newport News, VA	T 7–7		
November 27	at Richmond	Stadium Field; Richmond, VA (rivalry)	W 20–6		
