= 1924 Erskine Seceders football team =

American college football season

1924 Erskine Seceders football
- Conference: Southern Intercollegiate Athletic Association
- Record: 1–7 (0–4 SIAA)
- Head coach: Robert S. Galloway (2nd season)

1924 Southern Intercollegiate Athletic Association football standings
	Conf.					Overall
Team	W		L		T	W		L		T
Centre +	1	–	0	–	0	5	–	1	–	1
Oglethorpe +	5	–	0	–	0	6	–	3	–	1
Mississippi College	2	–	0	–	1	2	–	5	–	1
Newberry	4	–	1	–	0	8	–	2	–	0
Mercer	4	–	1	–	1	5	–	3	–	2
Sewanee*	2	–	1	–	0	6	–	4	–	0
The Citadel	4	–	2	–	0	6	–	4	–	0
Louisville	2	–	1	–	0	3	–	4	–	1
Millsaps	1	–	1	–	0	3	–	5	–	1
Georgetown (KY)	1	–	1	–	0	1	–	4	–	0
Transylvania	1	–	2	–	0	6	–	2	–	0
Furman	1	–	2	–	0	5	–	5	–	0
Wofford	2	–	4	–	0	3	–	7	–	0
Howard (AL)	1	–	3	–	0	3	–	5	–	1
Presbyterian	1	–	3	–	0	1	–	6	–	1
Vanderbilt*	0	–	1	–	0	6	–	3	–	1
Louisiana College	0	–	1	–	0	0	–	1	–	0
Western Kentucky	0	–	2	–	0	4	–	6	–	0
Erskine	0	–	4	–	0	1	–	7	–	0
Chattanooga	0	–	5	–	0	1	–	7	–	1
+ – Conference co-champions; * – co-member of SoCon

The 1924 Erskine Seceders football team was an American football team that represented Erskine College as a member of the Southern Intercollegiate Athletic Association (SIAA) during the 1924 college football season. In their second year under head coach Robert S. Galloway, the team compiled a 1–7 record.

== Schedule ==
Date	Opponent	Site	Result	Source
September 27	at South Carolina*	University Field; Columbia, SC	L 0–47	
October 10	at Piedmont*	Cornelia, GA	W 19–0	
October 24	at Wofford	Wofford Field; Spartanburg, SC	L 0–3	
October 30	Parris Island Marines*	Due West, SC	L 6–7	
November 7	at Presbyterian	Clinton, SC	L 0–7	
November 14	at Newberry	Setzler Field; Newberry, SC	L 0–13	
November 22	at The Citadel	College Park Stadium; Charleston, SC	L 0–7	
November 29	at Lenoir–Rhyne*	L–R Stadium; Hickory, NC	L 0–12	
*Non-conference game
