= 1924 Howard Bulldogs football team =

American college football season

1924 Howard Bulldogs football
- Conference: Southern Intercollegiate Athletic Association
- Record: 3–5–1 (1–3 SIAA)
- Head coach: Jenks Gillem (1st season)
- Home stadium: Berry Field; Rickwood Field

1924 Southern Intercollegiate Athletic Association football standings
	Conf.					Overall
Team	W		L		T	W		L		T
Centre +	1	–	0	–	0	5	–	1	–	1
Oglethorpe +	5	–	0	–	0	6	–	3	–	1
Mississippi College	2	–	0	–	1	2	–	5	–	1
Newberry	4	–	1	–	0	8	–	2	–	0
Mercer	4	–	1	–	1	5	–	3	–	2
Sewanee*	2	–	1	–	0	6	–	4	–	0
The Citadel	4	–	2	–	0	6	–	4	–	0
Louisville	2	–	1	–	0	3	–	4	–	1
Millsaps	1	–	1	–	0	3	–	5	–	1
Georgetown (KY)	1	–	1	–	0	1	–	4	–	0
Transylvania	1	–	2	–	0	6	–	2	–	0
Furman	1	–	2	–	0	5	–	5	–	0
Wofford	2	–	4	–	0	3	–	7	–	0
Howard (AL)	1	–	3	–	0	3	–	5	–	1
Presbyterian	1	–	3	–	0	1	–	6	–	1
Vanderbilt*	0	–	1	–	0	6	–	3	–	1
Louisiana College	0	–	1	–	0	0	–	1	–	0
Western Kentucky	0	–	2	–	0	4	–	6	–	0
Erskine	0	–	4	–	0	1	–	7	–	0
Chattanooga	0	–	5	–	0	1	–	7	–	1
+ – Conference co-champions; * – co-member of SoCon

The 1924 Howard Bulldogs football team was an American football team that represented Howard College (now known as the Samford University) as a member of the Southern Intercollegiate Athletic Association (SIAA) during the 1924 college football season. In their first year under head coach Jenks Gillem, the team compiled a 3–5–1 record.

== Schedule ==
Date	Opponent	Site	Result	Attendance	Source
September 20	Marion*	Berry Field; Birmingham, AL	W 29–0	3,000	
October 4	Jacksonville State*	Berry Field; Birmingham, AL (rivalry)	W 35–0		
October 11	at Chattanooga	Chamberlain Field; Chattanooga, TN	W 28–0		
October 18	at Auburn*	Drake Field; Auburn, AL	L 0–17		
October 25	at Mercer	Alumni Field; Macon, GA	L 5–14	5,000	
November 1	Spring Hill*	Rickwood Field; Birmingham, AL	L 0–6		
November 8	Oglethorpe	Rickwood Field; Birmingham, AL	L 7–32		
November 14	at Millsaps	State Fairgrounds; Jackson, MS	L 0–14		
November 22	vs. Birmingham–Southern*	Rickwood Field; Birmingham, AL	T 0–0		
*Non-conference game
