= 1924 Mississippi College Choctaws football team =

American college football season

1924 Mississippi College Choctaws football
- Conference: Southern Intercollegiate Athletic Association
- Record: 2–5–1 (2–0–1 SIAA)
- Head coach: George Bohler (2nd season)
- Home stadium: Provine Field

1924 Southern Intercollegiate Athletic Association football standings
	Conf.					Overall
Team	W		L		T	W		L		T
Centre +	1	–	0	–	0	5	–	1	–	1
Oglethorpe +	5	–	0	–	0	6	–	3	–	1
Mississippi College	2	–	0	–	1	2	–	5	–	1
Newberry	4	–	1	–	0	8	–	2	–	0
Mercer	4	–	1	–	1	5	–	3	–	2
Sewanee*	2	–	1	–	0	6	–	4	–	0
The Citadel	4	–	2	–	0	6	–	4	–	0
Louisville	2	–	1	–	0	3	–	4	–	1
Millsaps	1	–	1	–	0	3	–	5	–	1
Georgetown (KY)	1	–	1	–	0	1	–	4	–	0
Transylvania	1	–	2	–	0	6	–	2	–	0
Furman	1	–	2	–	0	5	–	5	–	0
Wofford	2	–	4	–	0	3	–	7	–	0
Howard (AL)	1	–	3	–	0	3	–	5	–	1
Presbyterian	1	–	3	–	0	1	–	6	–	1
Vanderbilt*	0	–	1	–	0	6	–	3	–	1
Louisiana College	0	–	1	–	0	0	–	1	–	0
Western Kentucky	0	–	2	–	0	4	–	6	–	0
Erskine	0	–	4	–	0	1	–	7	–	0
Chattanooga	0	–	5	–	0	1	–	7	–	1
+ – Conference co-champions; * – co-member of SoCon

The 1924 Mississippi College Choctaws football team was an American football team that represented Mississippi College as a member of the Southern Intercollegiate Athletic Association (SIAA) during the 1924 college football season. In their second year under head coach George Bohler, the team compiled a 2–5–1 record.

== Schedule ==
Date	Opponent	Site	Result	Attendance	Source
October 4	at Tulane*	Tulane Stadium; New Orleans, LA	L 7–32		
October 11	at Alabama*	Denny Field; Tuscaloosa, AL	L 0–51		
October 17	vs. Millsaps	Fairgrounds; Jackson, MS (rivalry)	W 14–0	5,000	
October 25	Birmingham–Southern*	Provine Field; Clinton, MS	L 6–13		
November 8	Louisiana College	Provine Field; Clinton, MS	W 48–7		
November 15	at Mississippi A&M*	Scott Field; Starkville, MS	L 6–7		
November 22	at Ole Miss*	Hemingway Stadium; Oxford, MS	L 6–10		
November 27	at Mercer	Alumni Field; Macon, GA	T 7–7		
*Non-conference game
