= 1924 Oglethorpe Stormy Petrels football team =

American college football season

1924 Oglethorpe Stormy Petrels football

SIAA co-champion
- Conference: Southern Intercollegiate Athletic Association
- Record: 6–3–1 (5–0 SIAA)
- Head coach: Harry J. Robertson (1st season)
- Offensive scheme: Double wing
- Captain: Adrian Maurer
- Home stadium: Spiller Field

1924 Southern Intercollegiate Athletic Association football standings
	Conf.					Overall
Team	W		L		T	W		L		T
Centre +	1	–	0	–	0	5	–	1	–	1
Oglethorpe +	5	–	0	–	0	6	–	3	–	1
Mississippi College	2	–	0	–	1	2	–	5	–	1
Newberry	4	–	1	–	0	8	–	2	–	0
Mercer	4	–	1	–	1	5	–	3	–	2
Sewanee*	2	–	1	–	0	6	–	4	–	0
The Citadel	4	–	2	–	0	6	–	4	–	0
Louisville	2	–	1	–	0	3	–	4	–	1
Millsaps	1	–	1	–	0	3	–	5	–	1
Georgetown (KY)	1	–	1	–	0	1	–	4	–	0
Transylvania	1	–	2	–	0	6	–	2	–	0
Furman	1	–	2	–	0	5	–	5	–	0
Wofford	2	–	4	–	0	3	–	7	–	0
Howard (AL)	1	–	3	–	0	3	–	5	–	1
Presbyterian	1	–	3	–	0	1	–	6	–	1
Vanderbilt*	0	–	1	–	0	6	–	3	–	1
Louisiana College	0	–	1	–	0	0	–	1	–	0
Western Kentucky	0	–	2	–	0	4	–	6	–	0
Erskine	0	–	4	–	0	1	–	7	–	0
Chattanooga	0	–	5	–	0	1	–	7	–	1
+ – Conference co-champions; * – co-member of SoCon

The 1924 Oglethorpe Stormy Petrels football team was an American football team that represented Oglethorpe University in the Southern Intercollegiate Athletic Association (SIAA) during the 1924 college football season. In its first season under head coach Harry J. Robertson, the team compiled a 6–3–1 record (5–0 against SIAA opponents), tied with Centre for the SIAA championship, and outscored opponents by a total of 140 to 86. Adrian Maurer was the team captain.

== Schedule ==
Date	Opponent	Site	Result	Source
September 27	at Georgia Tech*	Grant Field; Atlanta, GA	L 0–19	
October 4	at Fort Benning*	Columbus, GA	L 0–20	
October 11	at The Citadel	College Park Stadium; Charleston, SC	W 10–7	
October 17	vs. Wofford	American Legion Memorial Athletic Field; Anderson, SC	W 27–0	
October 25	at Loyola (LA)*	Loyola Stadium; New Orleans, LA	T 13–13	
November 1	Sewanee*	Spiller Field; Atlanta, GA	W 7–0	
November 8	at Howard (AL)	Rickwood Field; Birmingham, AL	W 32–7	
November 15	at Saint Louis*	St. Louis University Athletic Field; St. Louis, MO	L 6–18	
November 22	Mercer	Spiller Field; Atlanta, GA	W 25–0	
November 27	at Chattanooga	Chamberlain Field; Chattanooga, TN	W 20–2	
*Non-conference game
