= List of South Carolina college football state champions =

Before the 1939 Cotton Bowl champion Clemson Tigers, South Carolina college football teams claimed state titles, despite e. g. Clemson winning Southern Intercollegiate Athletic Association titles in 1903. In 1911, the Florida Gators beat 4 South Carolina teams and dubbed themselves the "champions of South Carolina".

== State champions ==
- Clemson (1897)
- Furman (1902)
- South Carolina (1912)
- Clemson (1913)
- Clemson (1914)
- The Citadel (1915)
- The Citadel (1916)
- Furman (1919)
- Furman (1920)
- Furman (1921)
- Furman (1924)
- Furman (1925)
- Clemson (1930)
- The Citadel (1938)
