= 1924 Western Kentucky State Normal football team =

American college football season

1924 Western Kentucky State Normal football
- Conference: Independent
- Record: 4–5
- Head coach: Edgar Diddle (3rd season)
- Captain: Wilson "Babe" Hunt
- Home stadium: Fair Grounds

1924 Southern college football independents records
	Conf.			Overall
Team	W	L	T	W		L		T
Stetson		–		6	–	0	–	0
Quantico Marines		–		7	–	0	–	1
Tennessee Docs		–		9	–	1	–	0
Centenary		–		8	–	1	–	0
West Virginia		–		8	–	1	–	0
West Virginia Wesleyan		–		9	–	2	–	0
Davidson		–		7	–	2	–	1
Wake Forest		–		7	–	2	–	0
George Washington		–		6	–	3	–	1
William & Mary		–		5	–	2	–	1
Delaware		–		4	–	3	–	1
Texas Mines		–		3	–	2	–	1
Mississippi State Teachers		–		3	–	3	–	2
Birmingham–Southern		–		4	–	4	–	1
Spring Hill		–		4	–	4	–	1
Georgetown		–		4	–	4	–	0
Marshall		–		4	–	4	–	0
Duke		–		4	–	5	–	0
Western Kentucky State Normal		–		4	–	5	–	0
East Tennessee State Normal		–		3	–	4	–	1
Loyola (LA)		–		3	–	4	–	2
Abilene Christian		–		3	–	4	–	2
Louisville		–		3	–	5	–	1
Georgia Normal		–		1	–	2	–	0
Southwestern		–		3	–	6	–	0
Union (TN)		–		3	–	6	–	0
Richmond		–		2	–	6	–	1
Catholic University		–		1	–	5	–	2
Navy		–		2	–	6	–	0
Middle Tennessee State Normal		–		1	–	5	–	0
West Tennessee State Normal		–		1	–	7	–	1
Delaware State		–		0	–	1	–	0

The 1924 Western Kentucky State Normal football team represented Western Kentucky State Normal School and Teachers College (now known as Western Kentucky University) in the 1924 college football season. They were coached by Edgar Diddle in his third year.

== Schedule ==
Date	Time	Opponent	Site	Result	Source
September 27		Campbellsville	Bowling Green, KY	W 65–0	
October 4		John Carroll	Bowling Green, KY	L 0–51	
October 11		Louisville	Louisville, KY	L 7–12	
October 18	2:30 p.m.	Middle Tennessee State Normal	Fair Grounds; Bowling Green, KY (rivalry)	W 44–0	
October 25	2:30 p.m.	Western State Normal	Fair Grounds; Bowling Green, KY	L 0–14	
November 8		Transylvania	Bowling Green, KY	L 0–13	
November 15		at St. Xavier	Corcoran Field; Cincinnati, OH	L 0–29	
November 22		Evansville	Bowling Green, KY	W 35–0	
November 27		Bethel (KY)	Bowling Green, KY	W 73–0	
All times are in Central time
