= 1924 Spring Hill Badgers football team =

American college football season

1924 Spring Hill Badgers football
- Conference: Independent
- Record: 4–4–1
- Head coach: Edward J. "Mickey" Connors (2nd season)
- Home stadium: Monroe Park

1924 Southern college football independents records
	Conf.			Overall
Team	W	L	T	W		L		T
Stetson		–		6	–	0	–	0
Quantico Marines		–		7	–	0	–	1
Tennessee Docs		–		9	–	1	–	0
Centenary		–		8	–	1	–	0
West Virginia		–		8	–	1	–	0
West Virginia Wesleyan		–		9	–	2	–	0
Davidson		–		7	–	2	–	1
Wake Forest		–		7	–	2	–	0
George Washington		–		6	–	3	–	1
William & Mary		–		5	–	2	–	1
Delaware		–		4	–	3	–	1
Texas Mines		–		3	–	2	–	1
Mississippi State Teachers		–		3	–	3	–	2
Birmingham–Southern		–		4	–	4	–	1
Spring Hill		–		4	–	4	–	1
Georgetown		–		4	–	4	–	0
Marshall		–		4	–	4	–	0
Duke		–		4	–	5	–	0
Western Kentucky State Normal		–		4	–	5	–	0
East Tennessee State Normal		–		3	–	4	–	1
Loyola (LA)		–		3	–	4	–	2
Abilene Christian		–		3	–	4	–	2
Louisville		–		3	–	5	–	1
Georgia Normal		–		1	–	2	–	0
Southwestern		–		3	–	6	–	0
Union (TN)		–		3	–	6	–	0
Richmond		–		2	–	6	–	1
Catholic University		–		1	–	5	–	2
Navy		–		2	–	6	–	0
Middle Tennessee State Normal		–		1	–	5	–	0
West Tennessee State Normal		–		1	–	7	–	1
Delaware State		–		0	–	1	–	0

The 1924 Spring Hill Badgers football team was an American football team that represented Spring Hill College as an independent during the 1924 college football season. Led by Edward J. "Mickey" Connors in his second season as head coach, the Badgers compiled an overall record of 4–4–1.

== Schedule ==
Date	Opponent	Site	Result	Source
September 27	at LSU	State Field; Baton Rouge, LA	L 6–7	
October 4	Marion	Monroe Park; Mobile, AL	W 7–0	
October 12	at Loyola (LA)	Loyola Stadium; New Orleans, LA	L 0–20	
October 18	Jacksonville State	Monroe Park; Mobile, AL	W 23–7	
October 25	at Tulane	Tulane Stadium; New Orleans, LA	L 0–33	
November 1	at Howard (AL)	Rickwood Field; Birmingham, AL	W 6–0	
November 8	Millsaps	Monroe Park; Mobile, AL	T 20–20	
November 13	at Georgia Tech Freshmen	Spiller Field; Atlanta, GA	L 7–12	
November 27	Union (TN)	Monroe Park; Mobile, AL	W 6–0	
