= 1924 Union (Tennessee) Bulldogs football team =

American college football season

1924 Union (Tennessee) Bulldogs football
- Conference: Independent
- Record: 3–6
- Head coach: Joe Guyon (3rd season)
- Home stadium: Jackson Athletic Park

1924 Southern college football independents records
	Conf.			Overall
Team	W	L	T	W		L		T
Stetson		–		6	–	0	–	0
Quantico Marines		–		7	–	0	–	1
Tennessee Docs		–		9	–	1	–	0
Centenary		–		8	–	1	–	0
West Virginia		–		8	–	1	–	0
West Virginia Wesleyan		–		9	–	2	–	0
Davidson		–		7	–	2	–	1
Wake Forest		–		7	–	2	–	0
George Washington		–		6	–	3	–	1
William & Mary		–		5	–	2	–	1
Delaware		–		4	–	3	–	1
Texas Mines		–		3	–	2	–	1
Mississippi State Teachers		–		3	–	3	–	2
Birmingham–Southern		–		4	–	4	–	1
Spring Hill		–		4	–	4	–	1
Georgetown		–		4	–	4	–	0
Marshall		–		4	–	4	–	0
Duke		–		4	–	5	–	0
Western Kentucky State Normal		–		4	–	5	–	0
East Tennessee State Normal		–		3	–	4	–	1
Loyola (LA)		–		3	–	4	–	2
Abilene Christian		–		3	–	4	–	2
Louisville		–		3	–	5	–	1
Georgia Normal		–		1	–	2	–	0
Southwestern		–		3	–	6	–	0
Union (TN)		–		3	–	6	–	0
Richmond		–		2	–	6	–	1
Catholic University		–		1	–	5	–	2
Navy		–		2	–	6	–	0
Middle Tennessee State Normal		–		1	–	5	–	0
West Tennessee State Normal		–		1	–	7	–	1
Delaware State		–		0	–	1	–	0

The 1924 Union Bulldogs football team was an American football team that represented Union University of Jackson, Tennessee as an independent during the 1924 college football season. Led by Joe Guyon in his third season as head coach, the Bulldogs compiled an overall record of 3–6.

== Schedule ==
Date	Opponent	Site	Result	Source
September 27	at Alabama	Denny Field; Tuscaloosa, AL	L 0–55	
October 3	Ouachita Baptist	Jackson Athletic Park; Jackson, TN	L 0–12	
October 11	Bethel (KY)	Jackson Athletic Park; Jackson, TN	L 0–6	
October 18	at Tennessee Docs	Russwood Park; Memphis, TN	L 0–33	
October 25	West Tennessee State Normal	Jackson Athletic Park; Jackson, TN	W 25–0	
November 1	Chattanooga	Jackson Athletic Park; Jackson, TN	W 26–6	
November 15	Cumberland (TN)	Jackson Athletic Park; Jackson, TN	W 19–13	
November 22	at Carson–Newman	Jefferson City, TN	L 0–20	
November 27	at Spring Hill	Mobile, AL	L 0–6	
