= 1924 George Washington Hatchetites football team =

American college football season

1924 George Washington Hatchetites football
- Conference: Independent
- Record: 6–3–1
- Head coach: Harry W. Crum (1st season)
- Home stadium: Griffith Stadium

1924 Southern college football independents records
	Conf.			Overall
Team	W	L	T	W		L		T
Stetson		–		6	–	0	–	0
Quantico Marines		–		7	–	0	–	1
Tennessee Docs		–		9	–	1	–	0
Centenary		–		8	–	1	–	0
West Virginia		–		8	–	1	–	0
West Virginia Wesleyan		–		9	–	2	–	0
Davidson		–		7	–	2	–	1
Wake Forest		–		7	–	2	–	0
George Washington		–		6	–	3	–	1
William & Mary		–		5	–	2	–	1
Delaware		–		4	–	3	–	1
Texas Mines		–		3	–	2	–	1
Mississippi State Teachers		–		3	–	3	–	2
Birmingham–Southern		–		4	–	4	–	1
Spring Hill		–		4	–	4	–	1
Georgetown		–		4	–	4	–	0
Marshall		–		4	–	4	–	0
Duke		–		4	–	5	–	0
Western Kentucky State Normal		–		4	–	5	–	0
East Tennessee State Normal		–		3	–	4	–	1
Loyola (LA)		–		3	–	4	–	2
Abilene Christian		–		3	–	4	–	2
Louisville		–		3	–	5	–	1
Georgia Normal		–		1	–	2	–	0
Southwestern		–		3	–	6	–	0
Union (TN)		–		3	–	6	–	0
Richmond		–		2	–	6	–	1
Catholic University		–		1	–	5	–	2
Navy		–		2	–	6	–	0
Middle Tennessee State Normal		–		1	–	5	–	0
West Tennessee State Normal		–		1	–	7	–	1
Delaware State		–		0	–	1	–	0

The 1924 George Washington Hatchetites football team was an American football team that represented George Washington University as an independent during the 1924 college football season. In their first season under head coach Harry W. Crum, the team compiled a 6–3–1 record.

== Schedule ==
Date	Time	Opponent	Site	Result	Source
September 27		Blue Ridge College	Central High School Stadium; Washington, DC	W 34–0	
October 4		at Juniata	Huntingdon, PA	L 0–7	
October 11		Western Maryland	Central High School Stadium; Washington, DC	W 19–0	
October 18		at Drexel	Strawbridge and Clothier Field; Philadelphia, PA	W 13–0	
October 25		Saint Joseph's	Central High School Stadium; Washington, DC	W 41–0	
November 1		at Johns Hopkins	Homewood Field; Baltimore, MD	T 3–3	
November 8		at Pennsylvania Military	Chester, PA	L 13–0	
November 15		at Delaware	Frazer Field; Newark, DE	L 0–6	
November 22		at Buffalo	Rotary Field; Buffalo, NY	W 7–0	
November 27	2:30 p.m.	at Catholic University	Brookland Stadium; Washington, DC	W 14–0	
All times are in Eastern time
