= 1924 Georgetown Blue and Gray football team =

American college football season

1924 Georgetown Blue and Gray football
- Conference: Independent
- Record: 4–4
- Head coach: Lou Little (1st season)
- Captain: Fred Sheehan
- Home stadium: Griffith Stadium; Georgetown Field

1924 Southern college football independents records
	Conf.			Overall
Team	W	L	T	W		L		T
Stetson		–		6	–	0	–	0
Quantico Marines		–		7	–	0	–	1
Tennessee Docs		–		9	–	1	–	0
Centenary		–		8	–	1	–	0
West Virginia		–		8	–	1	–	0
West Virginia Wesleyan		–		9	–	2	–	0
Davidson		–		7	–	2	–	1
Wake Forest		–		7	–	2	–	0
George Washington		–		6	–	3	–	1
William & Mary		–		5	–	2	–	1
Delaware		–		4	–	3	–	1
Texas Mines		–		3	–	2	–	1
Mississippi State Teachers		–		3	–	3	–	2
Birmingham–Southern		–		4	–	4	–	1
Spring Hill		–		4	–	4	–	1
Georgetown		–		4	–	4	–	0
Marshall		–		4	–	4	–	0
Duke		–		4	–	5	–	0
Western Kentucky State Normal		–		4	–	5	–	0
East Tennessee State Normal		–		3	–	4	–	1
Loyola (LA)		–		3	–	4	–	2
Abilene Christian		–		3	–	4	–	2
Louisville		–		3	–	5	–	1
Georgia Normal		–		1	–	2	–	0
Southwestern		–		3	–	6	–	0
Union (TN)		–		3	–	6	–	0
Richmond		–		2	–	6	–	1
Catholic University		–		1	–	5	–	2
Navy		–		2	–	6	–	0
Middle Tennessee State Normal		–		1	–	5	–	0
West Tennessee State Normal		–		1	–	7	–	1
Delaware State		–		0	–	1	–	0

The 1924 Georgetown Blue and Gray football team represented Georgetown University as an independent during the 1924 college football season. Led by Lou Little in his first season as head coach, the team finished the season with a record of 4–4.

== Schedule ==
Date	Opponent	Site	Result	Attendance	Source
October 11	King	Griffith Stadium; Washington, DC	W 21–7		
October 18	Quantico Marines	Griffith Stadium; Washington, DC	L 0–6		
October 25	Bucknell	Griffith Stadium; Washington, DC	L 6–14		
November 1	at Furman	Manly Field; Greenville, SC	W 20–0		
November 8	at Penn	Franklin Field; Philadelphia, PA	L 0–3	34,000	
November 15	3rd Army Corps	Georgetown Field; Washington, DC	W 6–0		
November 22	at Loyola (LA)	Loyola Stadium; New Orleans, LA	W 25–0		
November 29	at Fordham	Polo Grounds; New York, NY	L 6–9	6,000	
