= 1924 Birmingham–Southern Panthers football team =

American college football season

1924 Birmingham–Southern Panthers football
- Conference: Independent
- Record: 4–4–1
- Head coach: Harold Drew (1st season)
- Home stadium: Munger Bowl

1924 Southern college football independents records
	Conf.			Overall
Team	W	L	T	W		L		T
Stetson		–		6	–	0	–	0
Quantico Marines		–		7	–	0	–	1
Tennessee Docs		–		9	–	1	–	0
Centenary		–		8	–	1	–	0
West Virginia		–		8	–	1	–	0
West Virginia Wesleyan		–		9	–	2	–	0
Davidson		–		7	–	2	–	1
Wake Forest		–		7	–	2	–	0
George Washington		–		6	–	3	–	1
William & Mary		–		5	–	2	–	1
Delaware		–		4	–	3	–	1
Texas Mines		–		3	–	2	–	1
Mississippi State Teachers		–		3	–	3	–	2
Birmingham–Southern		–		4	–	4	–	1
Spring Hill		–		4	–	4	–	1
Georgetown		–		4	–	4	–	0
Marshall		–		4	–	4	–	0
Duke		–		4	–	5	–	0
Western Kentucky State Normal		–		4	–	5	–	0
East Tennessee State Normal		–		3	–	4	–	1
Loyola (LA)		–		3	–	4	–	2
Abilene Christian		–		3	–	4	–	2
Louisville		–		3	–	5	–	1
Georgia Normal		–		1	–	2	–	0
Southwestern		–		3	–	6	–	0
Union (TN)		–		3	–	6	–	0
Richmond		–		2	–	6	–	1
Catholic University		–		1	–	5	–	2
Navy		–		2	–	6	–	0
Middle Tennessee State Normal		–		1	–	5	–	0
West Tennessee State Normal		–		1	–	7	–	1
Delaware State		–		0	–	1	–	0

The 1924 Birmingham–Southern Panthers football team was an American football team that represented Birmingham–Southern College as an independent during the 1924 college football season. In their first season under head coach Harold Drew, the team compiled a 4–4–1 record.

== Schedule ==
Date	Opponent	Site	Result	Source
September 27	Auburn	Munger Bowl; Birmingham, AL	L 0–7	
October 4	at Vanderbilt	Dudley Field; Nashville, TN	L 0–61	
October 11	Millsaps	Munger Bowl; Birmingham, AL	W 6–0	
October 18	at Fort Benning	Gowdy Field; Fort Benning, GA	L 0–41	
October 25	at Mississippi College	Provine Field; Clinton, MS	W 13–6	
November 1	vs. Jacksonville State	Anniston, AL	W 25–6	
November 8	at Chattanooga	Chamberlain Field; Chattanooga, TN	L 7–20	
November 14	Southwestern (TN)	Munger Bowl; Birmingham, AL	W 19–6	
November 22	vs. Howard (AL)	Rickwood Field; Birmingham, AL	T 0–0	
