= 1924 West Virginia Mountaineers football team =

American college football season

1924 West Virginia Mountaineers football
- Conference: Independent
- Record: 8–1
- Head coach: Clarence Spears (4th season)
- Captain: Fred Graham
- Home stadium: Mountaineer Field

1924 Southern college football independents records
	Conf.			Overall
Team	W	L	T	W		L		T
Stetson		–		6	–	0	–	0
Quantico Marines		–		7	–	0	–	1
Tennessee Docs		–		9	–	1	–	0
Centenary		–		8	–	1	–	0
West Virginia		–		8	–	1	–	0
West Virginia Wesleyan		–		9	–	2	–	0
Davidson		–		7	–	2	–	1
Wake Forest		–		7	–	2	–	0
George Washington		–		6	–	3	–	1
William & Mary		–		5	–	2	–	1
Delaware		–		4	–	3	–	1
Texas Mines		–		3	–	2	–	1
Mississippi State Teachers		–		3	–	3	–	2
Birmingham–Southern		–		4	–	4	–	1
Spring Hill		–		4	–	4	–	1
Georgetown		–		4	–	4	–	0
Marshall		–		4	–	4	–	0
Duke		–		4	–	5	–	0
Western Kentucky State Normal		–		4	–	5	–	0
East Tennessee State Normal		–		3	–	4	–	1
Loyola (LA)		–		3	–	4	–	2
Abilene Christian		–		3	–	4	–	2
Louisville		–		3	–	5	–	1
Georgia Normal		–		1	–	2	–	0
Southwestern		–		3	–	6	–	0
Union (TN)		–		3	–	6	–	0
Richmond		–		2	–	6	–	1
Catholic University		–		1	–	5	–	2
Navy		–		2	–	6	–	0
Middle Tennessee State Normal		–		1	–	5	–	0
West Tennessee State Normal		–		1	–	7	–	1
Delaware State		–		0	–	1	–	0

The 1924 West Virginia Mountaineers football team represented West Virginia University as an independent during the 1924 college football season. In their fourth and final season under head coach Clarence Spears, the Mountaineers compiled an 8–1 record and outscored opponents by a combined total of 282 to 47. The team played its home games at Mountaineer Field in Morgantown, West Virginia.

Guard Walter Mahan and end Fred Graham were selected as first-team All-Americans. Graham was also the team captain.

== Schedule ==
Date	Opponent	Site	Result	Attendance	Source
September 27	West Virginia Wesleyan	Mountaineer Field; Morgantown, WV	W 21–6	14,000	
October 4	Allegheny	Mountaineer Field; Morgantown, WV	W 35–6		
October 11	at Pittsburgh	Forbes Field; Pittsburgh, PA (rivalry)	L 7–14	25,000	
October 18	Geneva	Mountaineer Field; Morgantown, WV	W 55–0		
October 25	vs. Centre	Polo Grounds; New York, NY	W 13–6	5,000	
November 1	Bethany (WV)	Mountaineer Field; Morgantown, WV	W 71–6		
November 8	Colgate	Mountaineer Field; Morgantown, WV	W 34–2		
November 15	vs. Washington and Lee	Laidley Field; Charleston, WV	W 6–0		
November 27	Washington & Jefferson	Mountaineer Field; Morgantown, WV	W 40–7		
