= 1924 Delaware Fightin' Blue Hens football team =

American college football season

1924 Delaware Fightin' Blue Hens football
- Conference: Independent
- Record: 4–3–1
- Head coach: William McAvoy (3rd season)
- Home stadium: Frazer Field

1924 Southern college football independents records
	Conf.			Overall
Team	W	L	T	W		L		T
Stetson		–		6	–	0	–	0
Quantico Marines		–		7	–	0	–	1
Tennessee Docs		–		9	–	1	–	0
Centenary		–		8	–	1	–	0
West Virginia		–		8	–	1	–	0
West Virginia Wesleyan		–		9	–	2	–	0
Davidson		–		7	–	2	–	1
Wake Forest		–		7	–	2	–	0
George Washington		–		6	–	3	–	1
William & Mary		–		5	–	2	–	1
Delaware		–		4	–	3	–	1
Texas Mines		–		3	–	2	–	1
Mississippi State Teachers		–		3	–	3	–	2
Birmingham–Southern		–		4	–	4	–	1
Spring Hill		–		4	–	4	–	1
Georgetown		–		4	–	4	–	0
Marshall		–		4	–	4	–	0
Duke		–		4	–	5	–	0
Western Kentucky State Normal		–		4	–	5	–	0
East Tennessee State Normal		–		3	–	4	–	1
Loyola (LA)		–		3	–	4	–	2
Louisville		–		3	–	5	–	1
Georgia Normal		–		1	–	2	–	0
Southwestern		–		3	–	6	–	0
Union (TN)		–		3	–	6	–	0
Richmond		–		2	–	6	–	1
Catholic University		–		1	–	5	–	2
Navy		–		2	–	6	–	0
Middle Tennessee State Normal		–		1	–	5	–	0
West Tennessee State Normal		–		1	–	7	–	1
Delaware State		–		0	–	1	–	0

The 1924 Delaware Fightin' Blue Hens football team was an American football team that represented the University of Delaware in the 1924 college football season. In their third season under head coach William McAvoy, the Blue Hens compiled a 4–3–1 record and were outscored by a total of 45 to 44. The team played its home games at Frazer Field in Newark, Delaware.

== Schedule ==
Date	Opponent	Site	Result	Attendance	Source
October 4	Saint Joseph's	Frazer Field; Newark, DE	W 6–0		
October 11	at Ursinus	Collegeville, PA	T 0–0		
October 18	at Villanova	Villanova, PA (rivalry)	L 3–17		
October 25	St. John's (MD)	Frazer Field; Newark, DE	L 0–6		
November 1	Stevens	Frazer Field; Newark, DE	W 21–0		
November 8	Haverford	Frazer Field; Newark, DE	W 8–7		
November 15	George Washington	Frazer Field; Newark, DE	W 6–0		
November 22	vs. Dickinson	Harlan Field; Wilmington, DE	L 0–15		
