= 1924 Texas Mines Miners football team =

American college football season

1924 Texas Mines Miners football
- Conference: Independent
- Record: 3–2–1
- Head coach: George B. Powell (1st season)

1924 Southern college football independents records
	Conf.			Overall
Team	W	L	T	W		L		T
Stetson		–		6	–	0	–	0
Quantico Marines		–		7	–	0	–	1
Tennessee Docs		–		9	–	1	–	0
Centenary		–		8	–	1	–	0
West Virginia		–		8	–	1	–	0
West Virginia Wesleyan		–		9	–	2	–	0
Davidson		–		7	–	2	–	1
Wake Forest		–		7	–	2	–	0
George Washington		–		6	–	3	–	1
William & Mary		–		5	–	2	–	1
Delaware		–		4	–	3	–	1
Texas Mines		–		3	–	2	–	1
Mississippi State Teachers		–		3	–	3	–	2
Birmingham–Southern		–		4	–	4	–	1
Spring Hill		–		4	–	4	–	1
Georgetown		–		4	–	4	–	0
Marshall		–		4	–	4	–	0
Duke		–		4	–	5	–	0
Western Kentucky State Normal		–		4	–	5	–	0
East Tennessee State Normal		–		3	–	4	–	1
Loyola (LA)		–		3	–	4	–	2
Louisville		–		3	–	5	–	1
Georgia Normal		–		1	–	2	–	0
Southwestern		–		3	–	6	–	0
Union (TN)		–		3	–	6	–	0
Richmond		–		2	–	6	–	1
Catholic University		–		1	–	5	–	2
Navy		–		2	–	6	–	0
Middle Tennessee State Normal		–		1	–	5	–	0
West Tennessee State Normal		–		1	–	7	–	1
Delaware State		–		0	–	1	–	0

The 1924 Texas Mines Miners football team, sometimes known as the "Muckers", was an American football team that represented Texas School of Mines (now known as the University of Texas at El Paso) as an independent during the 1924 college football season. In its first season under head coach George B. Powell, the team compiled a 3–2–1 record and outscored opponents by a total of 70 to 51. The team lost its rivalry game with New Mexico A&M by a 19–0 score.

== Schedule ==
Date	Opponent	Site	Result	Source
October 18	Sul Ross	Rio Grande Park; El Paso, TX	W 32–6	
October 25	at New Mexico	Varsity field; Albuquerque, NM	L 0–18	
November 1	at New Mexico Military	Roswell, NM	T 6–6	
November 8	New Mexico A&M	El Paso, TX (rivalry)	L 0–19	
November 15	El Paso Junior College	El Paso, TX	W 26–0	
November 27	Wayland	El Paso, TX	W 6–2	
