= Fred Graham (American football) =

American football player (1900–1952)

No. 11
- Position: End

Personal information
- Born: December 11, 1900; Masontown, West Virginia, U.S.
- Died: August 29, 1952 (aged 51); Fairmont, West Virginia, U.S.
- Listed height: 6 ft 0 in (1.83 m)
- Listed weight: 175 lb (79 kg)

Career information
- High school: Morgantown (Morgantown, West Virginia)
- College: West Virginia (1921–1924)

Career history
- Providence Steam Roller (1926); Frankford Yellow Jackets (1926)

Awards and highlights
- NFL champion (1926)
- Stats at Pro Football Reference

Frederick Hartley Graham (December 11, 1900 – August 29, 1952) was an American football player. He played professionally for one season, in 1926, in the National Football League (NFL) as an end with the Providence Steam Roller and the Frankford Yellow Jackets.

Prior to joining the NFL, Graham attended and played college football at West Virginia University. At West Virginia, Graham excelled in football and basketball from 1921 to 1925 and earned first-team All-American honors in basketball in 1924. He also earned four letters in football as an end and served as captain of the 1924 West Virginia Mountaineers football team.

Graham was a member of West Virginia's only undefeated football team, which posted a 10–0–1 record in 1922. He helped West Virginia collect its first bowl game victory, a 21–13 decision over Gonzaga in the 1922 San Diego East-West Christmas Classic. During his Mountaineer career, West Virginia posted a 30–6–3 record. Graham was inducted into the WVU Athletics Hall of Fame in 2009.
