= 1924 Furman Purple Hurricane football team =

American college football season

1924 Furman Purple Hurricane football

State champion
- Conference: Southern Intercollegiate Athletic Association
- Record: 5–5 (1–2 SIAA)
- Head coach: Billy Laval (10th season)
- Captains: H. C. Burnett; Hartley Coleman
- Home stadium: Manly Field

1924 Southern Intercollegiate Athletic Association football standings
	Conf.					Overall
Team	W		L		T	W		L		T
Centre +	1	–	0	–	0	5	–	1	–	1
Oglethorpe +	5	–	0	–	0	6	–	3	–	1
Mississippi College	2	–	0	–	1	2	–	5	–	1
Newberry	4	–	1	–	0	8	–	2	–	0
Mercer	4	–	1	–	1	5	–	3	–	2
Sewanee*	2	–	1	–	0	6	–	4	–	0
The Citadel	4	–	2	–	0	6	–	4	–	0
Louisville	2	–	1	–	0	3	–	4	–	1
Millsaps	1	–	1	–	0	3	–	5	–	1
Georgetown (KY)	1	–	1	–	0	1	–	4	–	0
Transylvania	1	–	2	–	0	6	–	2	–	0
Furman	1	–	2	–	0	5	–	5	–	0
Wofford	2	–	4	–	0	3	–	7	–	0
Howard (AL)	1	–	3	–	0	3	–	5	–	1
Presbyterian	1	–	3	–	0	1	–	6	–	1
Vanderbilt*	0	–	1	–	0	6	–	3	–	1
Louisiana College	0	–	1	–	0	0	–	1	–	0
Western Kentucky	0	–	2	–	0	4	–	6	–	0
Erskine	0	–	4	–	0	1	–	7	–	0
Chattanooga	0	–	5	–	0	1	–	7	–	1
+ – Conference co-champions; * – co-member of SoCon

The 1924 Furman Purple Hurricane football team was an American football team that represented Furman University as a member of the Southern Intercollegiate Athletic Association (SIAA) during the 1924 college football season. In their tenth season under head coach Billy Laval, Furman compiled an overall record of 5–5 with a mark of 1–2 in SIAA play.

== Schedule ==
Date	Opponent	Site	Result	Source
September 27	Newberry	Manly Field; Greenville, SC	W 14–0	
October 4	Alabama*	Manly Field; Greenville, SC	L 0–20	
October 11	Mercer	Manly Field; Greenville, SC	L 0–23	
October 18	vs. Georgia*	Athletic Park; Augusta, GA	L 0–23	
October 22	vs. Davidson*	State Fairgrounds; Columbia, SC	W 6–0	
October 25	at The Citadel	College Park Stadium; Charleston, SC	L 0–6	
November 1	Georgetown*	Manly Field; Greenville, SC	L 0–20	
November 8	at South Carolina*	University Field; Columbia, SC	W 10–0	
November 14	Ole Miss*	Manly Field; Greenville, SC	W 7–2	
November 27	at Clemson*	Riggs Field; Clemson, SC	W 3–0	
*Non-conference game
