= 1924 Southwestern Lynx football team =

American college football season

1924 Southwestern Lynx football
- Conference: Independent
- Record: 3–6
- Head coach: Jess Neely (1st season)
- Home stadium: Shearen Field

1924 Southern college football independents records
	Conf.			Overall
Team	W	L	T	W		L		T
Stetson		–		6	–	0	–	0
Quantico Marines		–		7	–	0	–	1
Tennessee Docs		–		9	–	1	–	0
Centenary		–		8	–	1	–	0
West Virginia		–		8	–	1	–	0
West Virginia Wesleyan		–		9	–	2	–	0
Davidson		–		7	–	2	–	1
Wake Forest		–		7	–	2	–	0
George Washington		–		6	–	3	–	1
William & Mary		–		5	–	2	–	1
Delaware		–		4	–	3	–	1
Texas Mines		–		3	–	2	–	1
Mississippi State Teachers		–		3	–	3	–	2
Birmingham–Southern		–		4	–	4	–	1
Spring Hill		–		4	–	4	–	1
Georgetown		–		4	–	4	–	0
Marshall		–		4	–	4	–	0
Duke		–		4	–	5	–	0
Western Kentucky State Normal		–		4	–	5	–	0
East Tennessee State Normal		–		3	–	4	–	1
Loyola (LA)		–		3	–	4	–	2
Abilene Christian		–		3	–	4	–	2
Louisville		–		3	–	5	–	1
Georgia Normal		–		1	–	2	–	0
Southwestern		–		3	–	6	–	0
Union (TN)		–		3	–	6	–	0
Richmond		–		2	–	6	–	1
Catholic University		–		1	–	5	–	2
Navy		–		2	–	6	–	0
Middle Tennessee State Normal		–		1	–	5	–	0
West Tennessee State Normal		–		1	–	7	–	1
Delaware State		–		0	–	1	–	0

The 1924 Southwestern Presbyterian football team represented Southwestern, The College of the Mississippi Valley (now known as Rhodes College) during the 1924 college football season. In Jess Neely's first year coaching, he led the Lynx to a record of three wins and six losses.

== Schedule ==
Date	Opponent	Site	Result	Source
September 27	at Sewanee	Hardee Field; Sewanee, TN (rivalry)	L 0–7	
October 4	at Tennessee Docs	Russwood Park; Memphis, TN	L 0–34	
October 11	at Ole Miss	Hemingway Stadium; Oxford, MS	L 0–7	
October 17	Bryson College	Shearen Field; Clarksville, TN	W 10–0	
October 25	Ogden College	Shearen Field; Clarksville, TN	W 37–0	
November 1	at Millsaps	Fairgrounds; Jackson, MS	L 0–6	
November 7	Evansville	Shearen Field; Clarksville, TN	W 13–9	
November 14	at Birmingham–Southern	Munger Bowl; Birmingham, AL	L 6–19	
November 27	at Bethel (TN)	McKenzie, TN	L 6–19	
