= 1924 Davidson Wildcats football team =

American college football season

1924 Davidson Wildcats football
- Conference: Independent
- Record: 7–2–1
- Head coach: William L. Younger (2nd season)
- Home stadium: Richardson Field

1924 Southern college football independents records
	Conf.			Overall
Team	W	L	T	W		L		T
Stetson		–		6	–	0	–	0
Quantico Marines		–		7	–	0	–	1
Tennessee Docs		–		9	–	1	–	0
Centenary		–		8	–	1	–	0
West Virginia		–		8	–	1	–	0
West Virginia Wesleyan		–		9	–	2	–	0
Davidson		–		7	–	2	–	1
Wake Forest		–		7	–	2	–	0
George Washington		–		6	–	3	–	1
William & Mary		–		5	–	2	–	1
Delaware		–		4	–	3	–	1
Texas Mines		–		3	–	2	–	1
Mississippi State Teachers		–		3	–	3	–	2
Birmingham–Southern		–		4	–	4	–	1
Spring Hill		–		4	–	4	–	1
Georgetown		–		4	–	4	–	0
Marshall		–		4	–	4	–	0
Duke		–		4	–	5	–	0
Western Kentucky State Normal		–		4	–	5	–	0
East Tennessee State Normal		–		3	–	4	–	1
Loyola (LA)		–		3	–	4	–	2
Abilene Christian		–		3	–	4	–	2
Louisville		–		3	–	5	–	1
Georgia Normal		–		1	–	2	–	0
Southwestern		–		3	–	6	–	0
Union (TN)		–		3	–	6	–	0
Richmond		–		2	–	6	–	1
Catholic University		–		1	–	5	–	2
Navy		–		2	–	6	–	0
Middle Tennessee State Normal		–		1	–	5	–	0
West Tennessee State Normal		–		1	–	7	–	1
Delaware State		–		0	–	1	–	0

The 1924 Davidson Wildcats football team was an American football team that represented Davidson College as an independent during the 1924 college football season. In their second year under head coach William L. Younger, the team compiled a 7–2–1 record.

== Schedule ==
Date	Opponent	Site	Result	Attendance	Source
September 20	Elon	Richardson Field; Davidson, NC	W 14–0		
September 27	vs. Presbyterian	McCormick Field; Asheville, NC	W 15–3		
October 4	vs. Richmond	South Side Park; Winston-Salem, NC	W 7–0		
October 11	Wofford	Richardson Field; Davidson, NC	W 7–0		
October 18	Lenoir–Rhyne	Richardson Field; Davidson, NC	W 45–0		
October 22	vs. Furman	State Fairgrounds; Columbia, SC	L 0–6		
October 31	vs. NC State	Sandhills Fairgrounds; Pinehurst, NC	T 10–10		
November 8	vs. Clemson	Wearn Field; Charlotte, NC	W 7–0		
November 15	North Carolina	Richardson Field; Davidson, NC	L 0–6		
November 27	at Duke	Hanes Field; Durham, NC	W 21–13	4,000	
