= 1924 Duke Blue Devils football team =

American college football season

1924 Duke Blue Devils football
- Conference: Independent
- Record: 4–5
- Head coach: Howard Jones (1st season)
- Captain: Game captains

1924 Southern college football independents records
| | Conf. | | | Overall |
| Team | W | L | T | W | | L | | T |
|---|---|---|---|---|---|---|---|---|
| Stetson | | – | | 6 | – | 0 | – | 0 |
| Quantico Marines | | – | | 7 | – | 0 | – | 1 |
| Tennessee Docs | | – | | 9 | – | 1 | – | 0 |
| Centenary | | – | | 8 | – | 1 | – | 0 |
| West Virginia | | – | | 8 | – | 1 | – | 0 |
| West Virginia Wesleyan | | – | | 9 | – | 2 | – | 0 |
| Davidson | | – | | 7 | – | 2 | – | 1 |
| Wake Forest | | – | | 7 | – | 2 | – | 0 |
| George Washington | | – | | 6 | – | 3 | – | 1 |
| William & Mary | | – | | 5 | – | 2 | – | 1 |
| Delaware | | – | | 4 | – | 3 | – | 1 |
| Texas Mines | | – | | 3 | – | 2 | – | 1 |
| Mississippi State Teachers | | – | | 3 | – | 3 | – | 2 |
| Birmingham–Southern | | – | | 4 | – | 4 | – | 1 |
| Spring Hill | | – | | 4 | – | 4 | – | 1 |
| Georgetown | | – | | 4 | – | 4 | – | 0 |
| Marshall | | – | | 4 | – | 4 | – | 0 |
| Duke | | – | | 4 | – | 5 | – | 0 |
| Western Kentucky State Normal | | – | | 4 | – | 5 | – | 0 |
| East Tennessee State Normal | | – | | 3 | – | 4 | – | 1 |
| Loyola (LA) | | – | | 3 | – | 4 | – | 2 |
| Abilene Christian | | – | | 3 | – | 4 | – | 2 |
| Louisville | | – | | 3 | – | 5 | – | 1 |
| Georgia Normal | | – | | 1 | – | 2 | – | 0 |
| Southwestern | | – | | 3 | – | 6 | – | 0 |
| Union (TN) | | – | | 3 | – | 6 | – | 0 |
| Richmond | | – | | 2 | – | 6 | – | 1 |
| Catholic University | | – | | 1 | – | 5 | – | 2 |
| Navy | | – | | 2 | – | 6 | – | 0 |
| Middle Tennessee State Normal | | – | | 1 | – | 5 | – | 0 |
| West Tennessee State Normal | | – | | 1 | – | 7 | – | 1 |
| Delaware State | | – | | 0 | – | 1 | – | 0 |

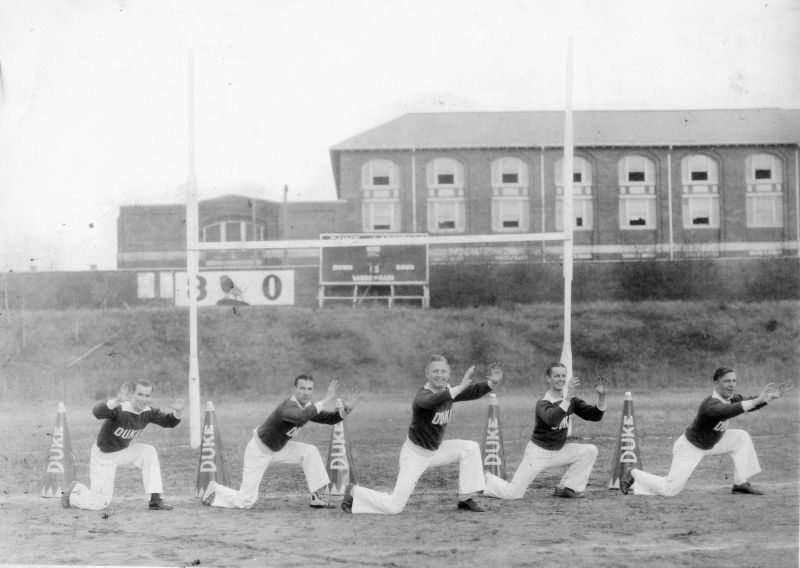
Cheerleaders for the Duke Blue Devils, 1924

The 1924 Duke Blue Devils football team was an American football team that represented Duke University as an independent during the 1924 college football season. In its first and only season under head coach Howard Jones, the team compiled a 4–5 record and outscored opponents by a total of 129 to 99. Jones was later inducted into the College Football Hall of Fame.

== Schedule ==
| Date | Time | Opponent | Site | Result | Attendance | Source |
|---|---|---|---|---|---|---|
| September 27 | | at NC State | Riddick Stadium; Raleigh, NC (rivalry) | L 0–14 | | |
| October 4 | | Guilford | Hanes Field; Durham, NC | W 33–6 | | |
| October 11 | | at North Carolina | Emerson Field; Chapel Hill, NC (rivalry) | L 0–6 | 7,500 | |
| October 18 | 3:00 p.m. | at Richmond | Stadium Field; Richmond, VA | W 14–0 | | |
| October 25 | | vs. William & Mary | League Park; Norfolk, VA | L 3–21 | | |
| November 1 | | Elon | Hanes Field; Durham, NC | W 54–0 | | |
| November 11 | | Wake Forest^{†} | Hanes Field; Durham, NC (rivalry) | L 0–32 | 7,000 | |
| November 15 | | Wofford | Hanes Field; Durham, NC | W 12–0 | | |
| November 27 | | Davidson | Hanes Field; Durham, NC | L 13–21 | 4,000 | |
^{†}Homecoming; All times are in Eastern time
