= Delaware State Hornets football, 1924–1929 =

American college football seasons

The Delaware State Hornets football 1924–1929 team represented Delaware State University as an independent conference team in the early history of college football in the United States.

== 1924 ==
1924 Delaware State Hornets football
- Conference: Independent
- Record: 0–1

The 1924 Delaware State Hornets football team represented Delaware State University in the 1924 college football season as an independent. Delaware State, in their first season, compiled a 0–1 record, losing their only game to Lincoln (PA).

Opponent	Site	Result
Lincoln (PA)		L 0–65

1924 Southern college football independents records
	Conf.			Overall
Team	W	L	T	W		L		T
Stetson		–		6	–	0	–	0
Quantico Marines		–		7	–	0	–	1
Tennessee Docs		–		9	–	1	–	0
Centenary		–		8	–	1	–	0
West Virginia		–		8	–	1	–	0
West Virginia Wesleyan		–		9	–	2	–	0
Davidson		–		7	–	2	–	1
Wake Forest		–		7	–	2	–	0
George Washington		–		6	–	3	–	1
William & Mary		–		5	–	2	–	1
Delaware		–		4	–	3	–	1
Texas Mines		–		3	–	2	–	1
Mississippi State Teachers		–		3	–	3	–	2
Birmingham–Southern		–		4	–	4	–	1
Spring Hill		–		4	–	4	–	1
Georgetown		–		4	–	4	–	0
Marshall		–		4	–	4	–	0
Duke		–		4	–	5	–	0
Western Kentucky State Normal		–		4	–	5	–	0
East Tennessee State Normal		–		3	–	4	–	1
Loyola (LA)		–		3	–	4	–	2
Abilene Christian		–		3	–	4	–	2
Louisville		–		3	–	5	–	1
Georgia Normal		–		1	–	2	–	0
Southwestern		–		3	–	6	–	0
Union (TN)		–		3	–	6	–	0
Richmond		–		2	–	6	–	1
Catholic University		–		1	–	5	–	2
Navy		–		2	–	6	–	0
Middle Tennessee State Normal		–		1	–	5	–	0
West Tennessee State Normal		–		1	–	7	–	1
Delaware State		–		0	–	1	–	0

== 1925 ==
1925 Delaware State Hornets football
- Conference: Independent
- Record: 0–2
- Head coach: Unknown

The 1925 Delaware State Hornets football team represented Delaware State University in the 1925 college football season as an independent. In the school's second season, Delaware State compiled a 0–2 record, with losses against Atlantic City High School and Moorestown High School.

Opponent	Site	Result
Atlantic City High School		L 6–27
Moorestown High School		L 13–21

1925 Southern college football independents records
	Conf.			Overall
Team	W	L	T	W		L		T
Louisville		–		8	–	0	–	0
Georgetown		–		9	–	1	–	0
Howard		–		6	–	0	–	2
Tennessee State		–		4	–	1	–	0
Texas Mines		–		5	–	1	–	1
Texas Tech		–		6	–	1	–	2
Stetson		–		6	–	2	–	1
Wake Forest		–		6	–	2	–	1
Davidson		–		6	–	2	–	2
George Washington		–		6	–	2	–	2
Navy		–		5	–	2	–	1
Texas A&I		–		4	–	2	–	1
William & Mary		–		6	–	4	–	0
Catholic University		–		4	–	4	–	0
Delaware		–		4	–	4	–	0
Spring Hill		–		4	–	4	–	0
Tennessee Docs		–		5	–	5	–	0
Duke		–		4	–	5	–	0
Middle Tennessee State Teachers		–		3	–	4	–	2
East Tennessee State Teachers		–		3	–	4	–	0
Western Kentucky State Normal		–		3	–	5	–	1
Georgia Normal		–		1	–	2	–	0
Richmond		–		3	–	6	–	0
Loyola (MD)		–		2	–	6	–	0
Delaware State		–		0	–	2	–	0
Mississippi State Teachers		–		0	–	6	–	0
West Tennessee State Teachers		–		0	–	7	–	1

== 1926 ==
1926 Delaware State Hornets football
- Conference: Independent
- Record: 1–0
- Head coach: Unknown

The 1926 Delaware State Hornets football team represented Delaware State University in the 1926 college football season as an independent. In the school's third season, Delaware State compiled a 1–0 record, winning their only game against Downingtown.

Date	Opponent	Site	Result	Source
November 13	at Downingtown	Downingtown, PA	W 14–0	

== 1927 ==
1927 Delaware State Hornets football
- Conference: Independent
- Record: 1–1
- Head coach: Naylor (1st season)

The 1927 Delaware State Hornets football team represented Delaware State University in the 1927 college football season as an independent. Though both Delaware State University and College Football Data Warehouse do not record this season, results for two games have been found. The first was a 13–0 victory over Howard High School of Technology and the second was a 12–26 loss against Princess Anne. Their coach was Naylor.

Date	Time	Opponent	Site	Result	Attendance	Source
October 29	2:00 p.m.	at Howard High School	Second & DuPont; Wilmington, DE	W 13–0		
November 11		at Princess Anne	Gordy Park; Princess Anne, MD	L 12–26	"a large crowd"	

== 1928 ==
1928 Delaware State Hornets football
- Conference: Independent
- Record: 1–1–1

The 1928 Delaware State Hornets football team represented Delaware State University in the 1928 college football season as an independent. Delaware State compiled a 1–1–1 record.

Date	Opponent	Site	Result	Source
October 27	Howard High School	Dover, DE	W 36–6	
November 3	at Bordentown	Bordentown, NJ	L 0–36	
November 10	at Princess Anne	Salisbury, MD	T 0–0	

== 1929 ==
1929 Delaware State Hornets football
- Conference: Independent
- Record: 1–0
- Head coach: Unknown

The 1929 Delaware State Hornets football team represented Delaware State University in the 1929 college football season as an independent. Delaware State compiled a 1–0 record, winning their only game 12–7 against Cheyney.

Date	Opponent	Site	Result	Source
November	Cheyney		W 12–7	
