= 1924 Mississippi State Teachers Yellow Jackets football team =

American college football season

1924 Mississippi State Teachers Yellow Jackets football
- Conference: Independent
- Record: 3–3–2
- Head coach: William Herschel Bobo (1st season)
- Home stadium: Kamper Park

1924 Southern college football independents records
	Conf.			Overall
Team	W	L	T	W		L		T
Stetson		–		6	–	0	–	0
Quantico Marines		–		7	–	0	–	1
Tennessee Docs		–		9	–	1	–	0
Centenary		–		8	–	1	–	0
West Virginia		–		8	–	1	–	0
West Virginia Wesleyan		–		9	–	2	–	0
Davidson		–		7	–	2	–	1
Wake Forest		–		7	–	2	–	0
George Washington		–		6	–	3	–	1
William & Mary		–		5	–	2	–	1
Delaware		–		4	–	3	–	1
Texas Mines		–		3	–	2	–	1
Mississippi State Teachers		–		3	–	3	–	2
Birmingham–Southern		–		4	–	4	–	1
Spring Hill		–		4	–	4	–	1
Georgetown		–		4	–	4	–	0
Marshall		–		4	–	4	–	0
Duke		–		4	–	5	–	0
Western Kentucky State Normal		–		4	–	5	–	0
East Tennessee State Normal		–		3	–	4	–	1
Loyola (LA)		–		3	–	4	–	2
Abilene Christian		–		3	–	4	–	2
Louisville		–		3	–	5	–	1
Georgia Normal		–		1	–	2	–	0
Southwestern		–		3	–	6	–	0
Union (TN)		–		3	–	6	–	0
Richmond		–		2	–	6	–	1
Catholic University		–		1	–	5	–	2
Navy		–		2	–	6	–	0
Middle Tennessee State Normal		–		1	–	5	–	0
West Tennessee State Normal		–		1	–	7	–	1
Delaware State		–		0	–	1	–	0

The 1924 Mississippi State Teachers Yellow Jackets football team was an American football team that represented the Mississippi State Teachers College (now known as the University of Southern Mississippi) as an independent during the 1924 college football season. In their first year under head coach William Herschel Bobo, the team compiled a 3–3–2 record.

== Schedule ==
Date	Opponent	Site	Result	Source
October 4	Clarke College (MS)	Kamper Park; Hattiesburg, MS	W 27–0	
October 18	at Loyola (LA)	Loyola Stadium; New Orleans, LA	L 7–32	
October 24	at Gulf Coast Military Academy	Gulfport, MS	T 14–14	
November 1	Pearl River	Kamper Park; Hattiesburg, MS	L 6–26	
November 7	at Mississippi A&M freshmen	Scott Field; Starkville, MS	T 14–14	
November 15	at Stetson	DeLand, FL	L 6–48	
November 22	Marion	Kamper Park; Hattiesburg, MS	W 7–6	
November 27	Louisiana College	Kamper Park; Hattiesburg, MS	W 13–12	
