= 1924 Navy Midshipmen football team =

American college football season

1924 Navy Midshipmen football
- Conference: Independent
- Record: 2–6
- Head coach: Bob Folwell (5th season)
- Captain: Edmund Taylor
- Home stadium: Thompson Stadium

Uniform
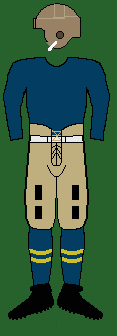

1924 Southern college football independents records
	Conf.			Overall
Team	W	L	T	W		L		T
Stetson		–		6	–	0	–	0
Quantico Marines		–		7	–	0	–	1
Tennessee Docs		–		9	–	1	–	0
Centenary		–		8	–	1	–	0
West Virginia		–		8	–	1	–	0
West Virginia Wesleyan		–		9	–	2	–	0
Davidson		–		7	–	2	–	1
Wake Forest		–		7	–	2	–	0
George Washington		–		6	–	3	–	1
William & Mary		–		5	–	2	–	1
Delaware		–		4	–	3	–	1
Texas Mines		–		3	–	2	–	1
Mississippi State Teachers		–		3	–	3	–	2
Birmingham–Southern		–		4	–	4	–	1
Spring Hill		–		4	–	4	–	1
Georgetown		–		4	–	4	–	0
Marshall		–		4	–	4	–	0
Duke		–		4	–	5	–	0
Western Kentucky State Normal		–		4	–	5	–	0
East Tennessee State Normal		–		3	–	4	–	1
Loyola (LA)		–		3	–	4	–	2
Louisville		–		3	–	5	–	1
Georgia Normal		–		1	–	2	–	0
Southwestern		–		3	–	6	–	0
Union (TN)		–		3	–	6	–	0
Richmond		–		2	–	6	–	1
Catholic University		–		1	–	5	–	2
Navy		–		2	–	6	–	0
Middle Tennessee State Normal		–		1	–	5	–	0
West Tennessee State Normal		–		1	–	7	–	1
Delaware State		–		0	–	1	–	0

The 1924 Navy Midshipmen football team represented the United States Naval Academy during the 1924 college football season. In their fifth season under head coach Bob Folwell, the Midshipmen compiled a 2–6 record and outscored opponents by a combined score of 84 to 69.

The annual Army–Navy Game was played on November 29 in Baltimore; Army won 12–0. The Midshipmen defeated Vermont 53–0, but were outscored 69–31 in their other seven games.

== Schedule ==
Date	Opponent	Site	Result	Source
October 4	William & Mary	Thompson Stadium; Annapolis, MD	W 14–7	
October 11	Marquette	Farragut Field; Annapolis, MD	L 3–21	
October 18	at Princeton	Palmer Stadium; Princeton, NJ	L 14–17	
October 25	West Virginia Wesleyan	Thompson Stadium; Annapolis, MD	L 7–10	
November 1	Penn State	Thompson Stadium; Annapolis, MD	L 0–6	
November 8	Vermont	Thompson Stadium; Annapolis, MD	W 53–0	
November 15	Bucknell	Thompson Stadium; Annapolis, MD	L 0–6	
November 29	vs. Army	Municipal Stadium; Baltimore, MD (Army–Navy Game)	L 0–12	
