= 1924 West Tennessee State Normal football team =

American college football season

1924 West Tennessee State Normal football
- Conference: Independent
- Record: 1–7–1
- Head coach: Zach Curlin (1st season)
- Captains: Red Allen; Gene Packard
- Home stadium: Russwood Park

1924 Southern college football independents records
	Conf.			Overall
Team	W	L	T	W		L		T
Stetson		–		6	–	0	–	0
Quantico Marines		–		7	–	0	–	1
Tennessee Docs		–		9	–	1	–	0
Centenary		–		8	–	1	–	0
West Virginia		–		8	–	1	–	0
West Virginia Wesleyan		–		9	–	2	–	0
Davidson		–		7	–	2	–	1
Wake Forest		–		7	–	2	–	0
George Washington		–		6	–	3	–	1
William & Mary		–		5	–	2	–	1
Delaware		–		4	–	3	–	1
Texas Mines		–		3	–	2	–	1
Mississippi State Teachers		–		3	–	3	–	2
Birmingham–Southern		–		4	–	4	–	1
Spring Hill		–		4	–	4	–	1
Georgetown		–		4	–	4	–	0
Marshall		–		4	–	4	–	0
Duke		–		4	–	5	–	0
Western Kentucky State Normal		–		4	–	5	–	0
East Tennessee State Normal		–		3	–	4	–	1
Loyola (LA)		–		3	–	4	–	2
Abilene Christian		–		3	–	4	–	2
Louisville		–		3	–	5	–	1
Georgia Normal		–		1	–	2	–	0
Southwestern		–		3	–	6	–	0
Union (TN)		–		3	–	6	–	0
Richmond		–		2	–	6	–	1
Catholic University		–		1	–	5	–	2
Navy		–		2	–	6	–	0
Middle Tennessee State Normal		–		1	–	5	–	0
West Tennessee State Normal		–		1	–	7	–	1
Delaware State		–		0	–	1	–	0

The 1924 West Tennessee State Normal football team was an American football team that represented West Tennessee State Normal School (now known as the University of Memphis) as an independent during the 1924 college football season. In their first season under head coach Zach Curlin, West Tennessee State Normal compiled a 1–7–1 record.

== Schedule ==
Date	Time	Opponent	Site	Result	Attendance	Source
October 3		at Hendrix	Young Memorial Stadium; Conway, AR	L 0–51		
October 10		at Arkansas College	Batesville, AR	L 0–49		
October 17	2:30 p.m.	Jonesboro College	Russwood Park; Memphis, TN	W 33–6		
October 25		at Union (TN)	Jackson Athletic Park; Jackson, TN	L 0–25		
October 31	2:30 p.m.	Mississippi Heights Academy	Russwood Park; Memphis, TN	L 7–18		
November 11	2:15 p.m.	vs. Tennessee Docs	Russwood Park; Memphis, TN	L 0–58		
November 15		at Bethel (TN)	McKenzie, TN	L 0–6		
November 22	2:15 p.m.	Hall-Moody	Russwood Park; Memphis, TN	L 0–26		
November 27		at Murray State	Murray, KY	T 0–0	1,000	
All times are in Central time
