= 1924 Marshall Thundering Herd football team =

American college football season

1924 Marshall Thundering Herd football
- Conference: Independent
- Record: 4–4
- Head coach: Russ Meredith (1st season)
- Captain: Page Hay
- Home stadium: Central Field

1924 Southern college football independents records
	Conf.			Overall
Team	W	L	T	W		L		T
Stetson		–		6	–	0	–	0
Quantico Marines		–		7	–	0	–	1
Tennessee Docs		–		9	–	1	–	0
Centenary		–		8	–	1	–	0
West Virginia		–		8	–	1	–	0
West Virginia Wesleyan		–		9	–	2	–	0
Davidson		–		7	–	2	–	1
Wake Forest		–		7	–	2	–	0
George Washington		–		6	–	3	–	1
William & Mary		–		5	–	2	–	1
Delaware		–		4	–	3	–	1
Texas Mines		–		3	–	2	–	1
Mississippi State Teachers		–		3	–	3	–	2
Birmingham–Southern		–		4	–	4	–	1
Spring Hill		–		4	–	4	–	1
Georgetown		–		4	–	4	–	0
Marshall		–		4	–	4	–	0
Duke		–		4	–	5	–	0
Western Kentucky State Normal		–		4	–	5	–	0
East Tennessee State Normal		–		3	–	4	–	1
Loyola (LA)		–		3	–	4	–	2
Abilene Christian		–		3	–	4	–	2
Louisville		–		3	–	5	–	1
Georgia Normal		–		1	–	2	–	0
Southwestern		–		3	–	6	–	0
Union (TN)		–		3	–	6	–	0
Richmond		–		2	–	6	–	1
Catholic University		–		1	–	5	–	2
Navy		–		2	–	6	–	0
Middle Tennessee State Normal		–		1	–	5	–	0
West Tennessee State Normal		–		1	–	7	–	1
Delaware State		–		0	–	1	–	0

The 1924 Marshall Thundering Herd football team represented Marshall College (now known as Marshall University) as an independent during the 1924 college football season. Marshall posted a 4–4 record, being outscored by its opposition 48–113. Home games were played on a campus field called "Central Field" which is presently Campus Commons.

== Schedule ==
Date	Opponent	Site	Result
October 4	New River State	Central Field; Huntington, WV	W 13–3
October 11	Marietta	Central Field; Huntington, WV	L 0–3
October 17	Salem	Central Field; Huntington, WV	W 9–7
October 25	at Muskingum	New Concord, OH	W 3–0
November 1	vs. Concord	Bluefield, WV	L 0–23
November 15	at Davis & Elkins	Elkins, WV	L 0–43
November 22	at Transylvania	Lexington KY	L 7–28
November 27	Louisville^{†}	Central Field; Huntington, WV	W 16–6
^{†}Homecoming
