= 1924 Centre Praying Colonels football team =

American college football season

1924 Centre Praying Colonels football

Southern champion SIAA co-champion
- Conference: Southern Intercollegiate Athletic Association
- Record: 5–1–1 (1–0 SIAA)
- Head coach: Robert L. Myers (2nd season)
- Home stadium: Cheek Field

Uniform
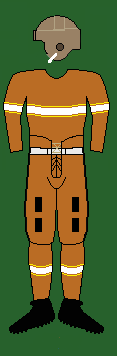

1924 Southern Intercollegiate Athletic Association football standings
	Conf.					Overall
Team	W		L		T	W		L		T
Centre +	1	–	0	–	0	5	–	1	–	1
Oglethorpe +	5	–	0	–	0	6	–	3	–	1
Mississippi College	2	–	0	–	1	2	–	5	–	1
Newberry	4	–	1	–	0	8	–	2	–	0
Mercer	4	–	1	–	1	5	–	3	–	2
Sewanee*	2	–	1	–	0	6	–	4	–	0
The Citadel	4	–	2	–	0	6	–	4	–	0
Louisville	2	–	1	–	0	3	–	4	–	1
Millsaps	1	–	1	–	0	3	–	5	–	1
Georgetown (KY)	1	–	1	–	0	1	–	4	–	0
Transylvania	1	–	2	–	0	6	–	2	–	0
Furman	1	–	2	–	0	5	–	5	–	0
Wofford	2	–	4	–	0	3	–	7	–	0
Howard (AL)	1	–	3	–	0	3	–	5	–	1
Presbyterian	1	–	3	–	0	1	–	6	–	1
Vanderbilt*	0	–	1	–	0	6	–	3	–	1
Louisiana College	0	–	1	–	0	0	–	1	–	0
Western Kentucky	0	–	2	–	0	4	–	6	–	0
Erskine	0	–	4	–	0	1	–	7	–	0
Chattanooga	0	–	5	–	0	1	–	7	–	1
+ – Conference co-champions; * – co-member of SoCon

The 1924 Centre Praying Colonels football team represented Centre College in the 1924 college football season. The Praying Colonels scored 119 points while allowing 20 points and finished 5–1–1, giving Alabama its only loss of the season; Alabama did not lose another game until 1927.

Quarterback Herb Covington was named to the 1924 College Football All-America Team.

== Schedule ==
Date	Opponent	Site	Result	Attendance	Source
October 4	Valparaiso*	Cheek Field; Danville, KY	T 0–0		
October 18	Transylvania	Cheek Field; Danville, KY	W 43–0		
October 25	vs. West Virginia*	Polo Grounds; New York, NY	L 6–13	5,000	
November 1	at Kentucky*	Stoll Field; Lexington, KY (rivalry)	W 7–0		
November 8	at Tennessee*	Shields–Watkins Field; Knoxville, TN	W 32–0		
November 15	at Alabama*	Rickwood Field; Birmingham, AL	W 17–0	10,000	
November 29	Georgia*	Cheek Field; Danville, KY	W 14–7		
*Non-conference game
