= 1924 Middle Tennessee State Normal football team =

American college football season

1924 Middle Tennessee State Normal football
- Conference: Independent
- Record: 1–5
- Head coach: Guy Stephenson (1st season)
- Captain: Kenneth Miles

1924 Southern college football independents records
	Conf.			Overall
Team	W	L	T	W		L		T
Stetson		–		6	–	0	–	0
Quantico Marines		–		7	–	0	–	1
Tennessee Docs		–		9	–	1	–	0
Centenary		–		8	–	1	–	0
West Virginia		–		8	–	1	–	0
West Virginia Wesleyan		–		9	–	2	–	0
Davidson		–		7	–	2	–	1
Wake Forest		–		7	–	2	–	0
George Washington		–		6	–	3	–	1
William & Mary		–		5	–	2	–	1
Delaware		–		4	–	3	–	1
Texas Mines		–		3	–	2	–	1
Mississippi State Teachers		–		3	–	3	–	2
Birmingham–Southern		–		4	–	4	–	1
Spring Hill		–		4	–	4	–	1
Georgetown		–		4	–	4	–	0
Marshall		–		4	–	4	–	0
Duke		–		4	–	5	–	0
Western Kentucky State Normal		–		4	–	5	–	0
East Tennessee State Normal		–		3	–	4	–	1
Loyola (LA)		–		3	–	4	–	2
Abilene Christian		–		3	–	4	–	2
Louisville		–		3	–	5	–	1
Georgia Normal		–		1	–	2	–	0
Southwestern		–		3	–	6	–	0
Union (TN)		–		3	–	6	–	0
Richmond		–		2	–	6	–	1
Catholic University		–		1	–	5	–	2
Navy		–		2	–	6	–	0
Middle Tennessee State Normal		–		1	–	5	–	0
West Tennessee State Normal		–		1	–	7	–	1
Delaware State		–		0	–	1	–	0

The 1924 Middle Tennessee State Normal football team represented the Middle Tennessee State Normal School—now known as Middle Tennessee State University—as an independent during the 1924 college football season. Led by first-year head coach Guy Stephenson, the team compiled a record of 1–5. Kenneth Miles was the team captain.

== Schedule ==
Date	Time	Opponent	Site	Result	Source
October 4		Bethel (KY)	Murfreesboro, TN	L 0–13	
October 18	2:30 p.m.	at Western Kentucky State Normal	Fair Grounds; Bowling Green, KY (rivalry)	L 0–44	
		Tennessee Polytechnic	Murfreesboro, TN	L 0–6	
November 1		at Maryville (TN)	Wilson Field; Maryville, TN	L 0–28	
November 7		at Bethel (TN)	McKenzie, TN	W 13–0	
November 15		at Sewanee freshmen	Sewanee, TN	W 7–0 (practice?)	
November 21		at Cumberland (TN)	Kirl Field; Lebanon, TN	L 0–32	
All times are in Central time
