= 1924 East Tennessee State Normal football team =

American college football season

1924 East Tennessee State Normal football
- Conference: Independent
- Record: 3–3 (3–4–1 with non-countable games)
- Head coach: James Karl Luck (3rd season)
- Home stadium: Keystone Field

1924 Southern college football independents records
	Conf.			Overall
Team	W	L	T	W		L		T
Stetson		–		6	–	0	–	0
Quantico Marines		–		7	–	0	–	1
Tennessee Docs		–		9	–	1	–	0
Centenary		–		8	–	1	–	0
West Virginia		–		8	–	1	–	0
West Virginia Wesleyan		–		9	–	2	–	0
Davidson		–		7	–	2	–	1
Wake Forest		–		7	–	2	–	0
George Washington		–		6	–	3	–	1
William & Mary		–		5	–	2	–	1
Delaware		–		4	–	3	–	1
Texas Mines		–		3	–	2	–	1
Mississippi State Teachers		–		3	–	3	–	2
Birmingham–Southern		–		4	–	4	–	1
Spring Hill		–		4	–	4	–	1
Georgetown		–		4	–	4	–	0
Marshall		–		4	–	4	–	0
Duke		–		4	–	5	–	0
Western Kentucky State Normal		–		4	–	5	–	0
East Tennessee State Normal		–		3	–	4	–	1
Loyola (LA)		–		3	–	4	–	2
Abilene Christian		–		3	–	4	–	2
Louisville		–		3	–	5	–	1
Georgia Normal		–		1	–	2	–	0
Southwestern		–		3	–	6	–	0
Union (TN)		–		3	–	6	–	0
Richmond		–		2	–	6	–	1
Catholic University		–		1	–	5	–	2
Navy		–		2	–	6	–	0
Middle Tennessee State Normal		–		1	–	5	–	0
West Tennessee State Normal		–		1	–	7	–	1
Delaware State		–		0	–	1	–	0

The 1924 East Tennessee State Normal School football team was an American football team that represented East Tennessee State Normal School—now known as East Tennessee State University (ETSU)—as an independent in the 1924 college football season. They were led by third-year head coach James Karl Luck.

== Schedule ==
Date	Opponent	Site	Result	Source
September 26	Johnson City High School	Keystone Field; Johnson City, TN	T 0–0	
October 18	Emory and Henry	Keystone Field; Johnson City, TN	W 13–12	
October 24	at Lenoir–Rhyne	Hickory, NC	L 15–32	
November 1	at Tennessee freshmen	Shields–Watkins Field; Knoxville, TN	L 0–59	
November 7	Mars Hill	Johnson City, TN	W 30–6	
November 15	at Athens	Athens, TN	L 7–27	
November 22	Hiwassee	Johnson City, TN	W 7–6	
November 27	at Tusculum	City Athletic Park; Greeneville, TN	L 7–22	
