= 1924 The Citadel Bulldogs football team =

American college football season

1924 The Citadel Bulldogs football
- Conference: Southern Intercollegiate Athletic Association
- Record: 6–4 (4–2 SIAA)
- Head coach: Carl Prause (3rd season)
- Home stadium: College Park Stadium

1924 Southern Intercollegiate Athletic Association football standings
	Conf.					Overall
Team	W		L		T	W		L		T
Centre +	1	–	0	–	0	5	–	1	–	1
Oglethorpe +	5	–	0	–	0	6	–	3	–	1
Mississippi College	2	–	0	–	1	2	–	5	–	1
Newberry	4	–	1	–	0	8	–	2	–	0
Mercer	4	–	1	–	1	5	–	3	–	2
Sewanee*	2	–	1	–	0	6	–	4	–	0
The Citadel	4	–	2	–	0	6	–	4	–	0
Louisville	2	–	1	–	0	3	–	4	–	1
Millsaps	1	–	1	–	0	3	–	5	–	1
Georgetown (KY)	1	–	1	–	0	1	–	4	–	0
Transylvania	1	–	2	–	0	6	–	2	–	0
Furman	1	–	2	–	0	5	–	5	–	0
Wofford	2	–	4	–	0	3	–	7	–	0
Howard (AL)	1	–	3	–	0	3	–	5	–	1
Presbyterian	1	–	3	–	0	1	–	6	–	1
Vanderbilt*	0	–	1	–	0	6	–	3	–	1
Louisiana College	0	–	1	–	0	0	–	1	–	0
Western Kentucky	0	–	2	–	0	4	–	6	–	0
Erskine	0	–	4	–	0	1	–	7	–	0
Chattanooga	0	–	5	–	0	1	–	7	–	1
+ – Conference co-champions; * – co-member of SoCon

The 1924 The Citadel Bulldogs football team represented The Citadel, The Military College of South Carolina in the 1924 college football season. Carl Prause served as head coach for the third season. The Bulldogs played as members of the Southern Intercollegiate Athletic Association and played home games at College Park Stadium in Hampton Park. The first Homecoming day was held at The Citadel on October 25, 1924.

== Schedule ==
Date	Opponent	Site	Result	Source
September 27	Southern College (FL)*	College Park Stadium; Charleston, SC	W 12–0	
October 4	Wofford	College Park Stadium; Charleston, SC (rivalry)	W 19–0	
October 11	Oglethorpe	College Park Stadium; Charleston, SC	L 7–10	
October 16	vs. Newberry	Pee Dee Fairgrounds; Florence, SC	L 0–14	
October 25	Furman^{†}	College Park Stadium; Charleston, SC (rivalry)	W 6–0	
October 29	vs. South Carolina*	County Fairgrounds; Orangeburg, SC	L 3–14	
November 8	at Washington and Lee*	Wilson Field; Lexington, VA	L 7–32	
November 15	vs. Clemson*	Anderson, SC	W 20–0	
November 22	Erskine	College Park Stadium; Charleston, SC	W 7–0	
November 27	Presbyterian	College Park Stadium; Charleston, SC	W 13–0	
*Non-conference game; ^{†}Homecoming
