= 1924 Quantico Marines Devil Dogs football team =

College football season

1924 Quantico Marines Devil Dogs football
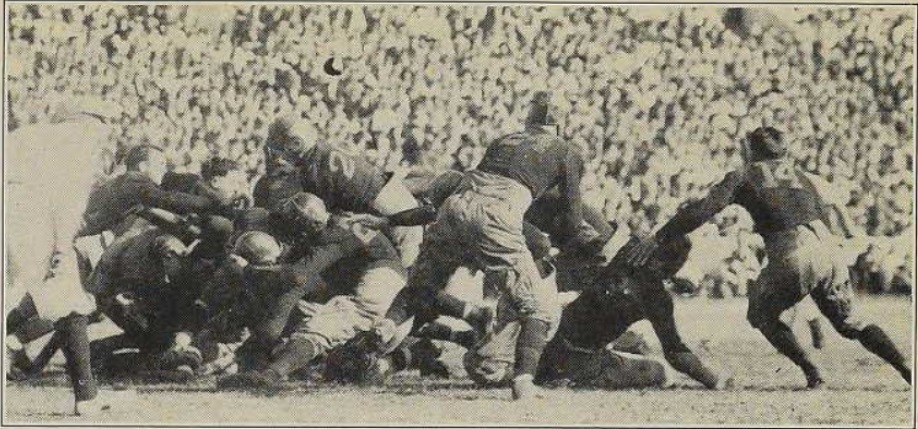
- Quantico Marines vs. Vanderbilt Commodores on October 11
- Conference: Independent
- Record: 7–0–1
- Head coach: John Beckett (4th season)

1924 Southern college football independents records
	Conf.			Overall
Team	W	L	T	W		L		T
Stetson		–		6	–	0	–	0
Quantico Marines		–		7	–	0	–	1
Tennessee Docs		–		9	–	1	–	0
Centenary		–		8	–	1	–	0
West Virginia		–		8	–	1	–	0
West Virginia Wesleyan		–		9	–	2	–	0
Davidson		–		7	–	2	–	1
Wake Forest		–		7	–	2	–	0
George Washington		–		6	–	3	–	1
William & Mary		–		5	–	2	–	1
Delaware		–		4	–	3	–	1
Texas Mines		–		3	–	2	–	1
Mississippi State Teachers		–		3	–	3	–	2
Birmingham–Southern		–		4	–	4	–	1
Spring Hill		–		4	–	4	–	1
Georgetown		–		4	–	4	–	0
Marshall		–		4	–	4	–	0
Duke		–		4	–	5	–	0
Western Kentucky State Normal		–		4	–	5	–	0
East Tennessee State Normal		–		3	–	4	–	1
Loyola (LA)		–		3	–	4	–	2
Abilene Christian		–		3	–	4	–	2
Louisville		–		3	–	5	–	1
Georgia Normal		–		1	–	2	–	0
Southwestern		–		3	–	6	–	0
Union (TN)		–		3	–	6	–	0
Richmond		–		2	–	6	–	1
Catholic University		–		1	–	5	–	2
Navy		–		2	–	6	–	0
Middle Tennessee State Normal		–		1	–	5	–	0
West Tennessee State Normal		–		1	–	7	–	1
Delaware State		–		0	–	1	–	0

The 1924 Quantico Marines Devil Dogs football team represented the Quantico Marine Base in the 1924 college football season. The team went undefeated with a single tie, finishing with a record of 7–0–1; all seven wins were by shutout. The team was led by fourth-year head coach John Beckett; Frank Goettge starred at fullback. The team did not play any games at their home field in Quantico, Virginia, as six games were played at opponent's home fields and two games against other military teams were played at neutral sites.

== Schedule ==
Date	Opponent	Site	Result	Attendance	Source
October 4	at Catholic University	Brookland Stadium (Note: October 4, 1924, was the dedication day of Brookland Stadium, which was used until 1985.); Washington, D.C.	W 33–0		
October 11	at Vanderbilt	Dudley Field; Nashville, TN	T 13–13	16,000	
October 18	at Georgetown	Griffith Stadium; Washington, D.C.	W 6–0		
November 1	vs. Fort Benning	Griffith Stadium; Washington, D.C.	W 39–0		
November 4	vs. Dickinson	Franklin Field; Philadelphia, PA	W 14–0	10,000	
November 15	at Detroit	Dinan Field; Detroit, MI	W 28–0		
November 22	at Carnegie Tech	Forbes Field; Pittsburgh, PA	W 3–0		
December 6	vs. Third Army Corps	Baltimore Stadium; Baltimore, MD	W 47–0	25,000	
