= 1924 Chattanooga Moccasins football team =

American college football season

1924 Chattanooga Moccasins football
- Conference: Southern Intercollegiate Athletic Association
- Record: 1–7–1 (0–5 SIAA)
- Head coach: Bill McAllester (3rd season)
- Captain: Norman Williams
- Home stadium: Chamberlain Field

1924 Southern Intercollegiate Athletic Association football standings
	Conf.					Overall
Team	W		L		T	W		L		T
Centre +	1	–	0	–	0	5	–	1	–	1
Oglethorpe +	5	–	0	–	0	6	–	3	–	1
Mississippi College	2	–	0	–	1	2	–	5	–	1
Newberry	4	–	1	–	0	8	–	2	–	0
Mercer	4	–	1	–	1	5	–	3	–	2
Sewanee*	2	–	1	–	0	6	–	4	–	0
The Citadel	4	–	2	–	0	6	–	4	–	0
Louisville	2	–	1	–	0	3	–	4	–	1
Millsaps	1	–	1	–	0	3	–	5	–	1
Georgetown (KY)	1	–	1	–	0	1	–	4	–	0
Transylvania	1	–	2	–	0	6	–	2	–	0
Furman	1	–	2	–	0	5	–	5	–	0
Wofford	2	–	4	–	0	3	–	7	–	0
Howard (AL)	1	–	3	–	0	3	–	5	–	1
Presbyterian	1	–	3	–	0	1	–	6	–	1
Vanderbilt*	0	–	1	–	0	6	–	3	–	1
Louisiana College	0	–	1	–	0	0	–	1	–	0
Western Kentucky	0	–	2	–	0	4	–	6	–	0
Erskine	0	–	4	–	0	1	–	7	–	0
Chattanooga	0	–	5	–	0	1	–	7	–	1
+ – Conference co-champions; * – co-member of SoCon

The 1924 Chattanooga Moccasins football team was an American football team that represented the University of Chattanooga (now known as the University of Tennessee at Chattanooga) as a member of the Southern Intercollegiate Athletic Association (SIAA) during the 1924 college football season. In their third year under head coach Bill McAllester, the team compiled a 1–7–1 record.

== Schedule ==
Date	Opponent	Site	Result	Source
September 27	Jacksonville State*	Chamberlain Field; Chattanooga, TN	L 13–14	
October 4	Cumberland (TN)*	Chamberlain Field; Chattanooga, TN	T 0–0	
October 11	Howard (AL)	Chamberlain Field; Chattanooga, TN	L 0–28	
October 18	at Mercer	Alumni Field; Macon, GA	L 0–33	
November 1	at Union (TN)*	Jackson Athletic Park; Jackson, TN	L 6–26	
November 8	Birmingham–Southern*	Chamberlain Field; Chattanooga, TN	W 20–7	
November 15	Georgetown (KY)	Chamberlain Field; Chattanooga, TN	L 6–13	
November 22	at Louisville	Parkway Field; Louisville, KY	L 0–10	
November 27	Oglethorpe	Chamberlain Field; Chattanooga, TN	L 2–20	
*Non-conference game
