= 1924 Richmond Spiders football team =

American college football season

1924 Richmond Spiders football
- Conference: Independent
- Record: 2–6–1
- Head coach: Frank Dobson (11th season)
- Captain: Claude Reams
- Home stadium: Stadium Field

1924 Southern college football independents records
	Conf.			Overall
Team	W	L	T	W		L		T
Stetson		–		6	–	0	–	0
Quantico Marines		–		7	–	0	–	1
Tennessee Docs		–		9	–	1	–	0
Centenary		–		8	–	1	–	0
West Virginia		–		8	–	1	–	0
West Virginia Wesleyan		–		9	–	2	–	0
Davidson		–		7	–	2	–	1
Wake Forest		–		7	–	2	–	0
George Washington		–		6	–	3	–	1
William & Mary		–		5	–	2	–	1
Delaware		–		4	–	3	–	1
Texas Mines		–		3	–	2	–	1
Mississippi State Teachers		–		3	–	3	–	2
Birmingham–Southern		–		4	–	4	–	1
Spring Hill		–		4	–	4	–	1
Georgetown		–		4	–	4	–	0
Marshall		–		4	–	4	–	0
Duke		–		4	–	5	–	0
Western Kentucky State Normal		–		4	–	5	–	0
East Tennessee State Normal		–		3	–	4	–	1
Loyola (LA)		–		3	–	4	–	2
Abilene Christian		–		3	–	4	–	2
Louisville		–		3	–	5	–	1
Georgia Normal		–		1	–	2	–	0
Southwestern		–		3	–	6	–	0
Union (TN)		–		3	–	6	–	0
Richmond		–		2	–	6	–	1
Catholic University		–		1	–	5	–	2
Navy		–		2	–	6	–	0
Middle Tennessee State Normal		–		1	–	5	–	0
West Tennessee State Normal		–		1	–	7	–	1
Delaware State		–		0	–	1	–	0

The 1924 Richmond Spiders football team was an American football team that represented the University of Richmond as an independent during the 1924 college football season. Led by 11th-year head coach, Frank Dobson, Richmond compiled a record of 2–6–1.

== Schedule ==
Date	Time	Opponent	Site	Result	Source
September 27		at VPI	Miles Field; Blacksburg, VA	L 0–28	
October 4		vs. Davidson	South Side Park; Winston-Salem, NC	L 0–7	
October 11		at Maryland	Byrd Stadium; College Park, MD	L 0–38	
October 18	3:00 p.m.	Duke	Stadium Field; Richmond, VA	L 0–14	
October 25		Randolph–Macon	Richmond, VA	W 25–0	
November 1		St. John's (MD)	Richmond, VA	W 9–7	
November 8		at Roanoke	Mahar Field; Roanoke, VA	L 0–9	
November 15		Hampden–Sydney	Richmond, VA	T 0–0	
November 27		William & Mary	Richmond, VA (rivalry)	L 6–20	
All times are in Eastern time
