= 1924 Tennessee Docs football team =

American college football season

1924 Tennessee Docs football
- Conference: Independent
- Record: 9–1
- Head coach: Bill Brennan (3rd season)
- Home stadium: Russwood Park

1924 Southern college football independents records
	Conf.			Overall
Team	W	L	T	W		L		T
Stetson		–		6	–	0	–	0
Quantico Marines		–		7	–	0	–	1
Tennessee Docs		–		9	–	1	–	0
Centenary		–		8	–	1	–	0
West Virginia		–		8	–	1	–	0
West Virginia Wesleyan		–		9	–	2	–	0
Davidson		–		7	–	2	–	1
Wake Forest		–		7	–	2	–	0
George Washington		–		6	–	3	–	1
William & Mary		–		5	–	2	–	1
Delaware		–		4	–	3	–	1
Texas Mines		–		3	–	2	–	1
Mississippi State Teachers		–		3	–	3	–	2
Birmingham–Southern		–		4	–	4	–	1
Spring Hill		–		4	–	4	–	1
Georgetown		–		4	–	4	–	0
Marshall		–		4	–	4	–	0
Duke		–		4	–	5	–	0
Western Kentucky State Normal		–		4	–	5	–	0
East Tennessee State Normal		–		3	–	4	–	1
Loyola (LA)		–		3	–	4	–	2
Abilene Christian		–		3	–	4	–	2
Louisville		–		3	–	5	–	1
Georgia Normal		–		1	–	2	–	0
Southwestern		–		3	–	6	–	0
Union (TN)		–		3	–	6	–	0
Richmond		–		2	–	6	–	1
Catholic University		–		1	–	5	–	2
Navy		–		2	–	6	–	0
Middle Tennessee State Normal		–		1	–	5	–	0
West Tennessee State Normal		–		1	–	7	–	1
Delaware State		–		0	–	1	–	0

The 1924 Tennessee Docs football team (variously "Docs", "UT Doctors" or the "Tennessee Medicos") represented the University of Tennessee College of Medicine in Memphis in the 1924 college football season. The team gave Centenary its season's only loss.

== Schedule ==
Date	Time	Opponent	Site	Result	Source
October 4		Southwestern (TN)	Russwood Park; Memphis, TN	W 34–0	
October 11		Cumberland (TN)	Russwood Park; Memphis, TN	W 19–0	
October 18		Union (TN)	Russwood Park; Memphis, TN	W 33–0	
October 25		at Centenary	Centenary Athletic Field; Shreveport, LA	W 7–6	
November 1		Tulsa	Russwood Park; Memphis, TN	W 43–0	
November 8		at Loyola (LA)	Loyola Stadium; New Orleans, LA	W 26–0	
November 11	2:15 p.m.	vs. West Tennessee State Normal	Russwood Park; Memphis, TN	W 58–0	
November 15		Dallas	Russwood Park; Memphis, TN	W 33–0	
November 21		at Russellville	Russellville, AR	L 0–3	
November 27		Lombard	Russwood Park; Memphis, TN	W 40–7	
All times are in Central time
