= 1924 Loyola Wolf Pack football team =

American college football season

1924 Loyola Wolf Pack football
- Conference: Independent
- Record: 3–4–2
- Head coach: Moon Ducote (1st season)
- Home stadium: Loyola Stadium

1924 Southern college football independents records
	Conf.			Overall
Team	W	L	T	W		L		T
Stetson		–		6	–	0	–	0
Quantico Marines		–		7	–	0	–	1
Tennessee Docs		–		9	–	1	–	0
Centenary		–		8	–	1	–	0
West Virginia		–		8	–	1	–	0
West Virginia Wesleyan		–		9	–	2	–	0
Davidson		–		7	–	2	–	1
Wake Forest		–		7	–	2	–	0
George Washington		–		6	–	3	–	1
William & Mary		–		5	–	2	–	1
Delaware		–		4	–	3	–	1
Texas Mines		–		3	–	2	–	1
Mississippi State Teachers		–		3	–	3	–	2
Birmingham–Southern		–		4	–	4	–	1
Spring Hill		–		4	–	4	–	1
Georgetown		–		4	–	4	–	0
Marshall		–		4	–	4	–	0
Duke		–		4	–	5	–	0
Western Kentucky State Normal		–		4	–	5	–	0
East Tennessee State Normal		–		3	–	4	–	1
Loyola (LA)		–		3	–	4	–	2
Abilene Christian		–		3	–	4	–	2
Louisville		–		3	–	5	–	1
Georgia Normal		–		1	–	2	–	0
Southwestern		–		3	–	6	–	0
Union (TN)		–		3	–	6	–	0
Richmond		–		2	–	6	–	1
Catholic University		–		1	–	5	–	2
Navy		–		2	–	6	–	0
Middle Tennessee State Normal		–		1	–	5	–	0
West Tennessee State Normal		–		1	–	7	–	1
Delaware State		–		0	–	1	–	0

The 1924 Loyola Wolf Pack football team was an American football team that represented Loyola College of New Orleans (now known as Loyola University New Orleans) as an independent during the 1924 college football season. In its first season under head coach Moon Ducote, the team compiled a 3–4–2 record and was outscored by a total of 145 to 98.

== Schedule ==
Date	Time	Opponent	Site	Result	Attendance	Source
October 4		at Centenary	Centenary Athletic Field; Shreveport, LA	L 0–51	4,000	
October 12		Spring Hill	Loyola Stadium; New Orleans, LA	W 20–0		
October 18		Mississippi State Teachers	Loyola Stadium; New Orleans, LA	W 32–7		
October 25		Oglethorpe	Loyola Stadium; New Orleans, LA	T 13–13		
November 1		Mercer	Loyola Stadium; New Orleans, LA	T 0–0		
November 8		Tennessee Docs	Loyola Stadium; New Orleans, LA	L 0–26	5,000	
November 16		Fort Benning	Loyola Stadium; New Orleans, LA	L 6–23	5,000	
November 22		Georgetown	Loyola Stadium; New Orleans, LA	L 0–25		
November 29	2:30 p.m.	Louisiana Tech	Loyola Stadium; New Orleans, LA	W 27–0		
All times are in Central time
