= 1924 Wake Forest Demon Deacons football team =

American college football season

1924 Wake Forest Demon Deacons football
- Conference: Independent
- Record: 7–2
- Head coach: Hank Garrity (2nd season)
- Captain: Bill Moran
- Home stadium: Gore Field

1924 Southern college football independents records
	Conf.			Overall
Team	W	L	T	W		L		T
Stetson		–		6	–	0	–	0
Quantico Marines		–		7	–	0	–	1
Tennessee Docs		–		9	–	1	–	0
Centenary		–		8	–	1	–	0
West Virginia		–		8	–	1	–	0
West Virginia Wesleyan		–		9	–	2	–	0
Davidson		–		7	–	2	–	1
Wake Forest		–		7	–	2	–	0
George Washington		–		6	–	3	–	1
William & Mary		–		5	–	2	–	1
Delaware		–		4	–	3	–	1
Texas Mines		–		3	–	2	–	1
Mississippi State Teachers		–		3	–	3	–	2
Birmingham–Southern		–		4	–	4	–	1
Spring Hill		–		4	–	4	–	1
Georgetown		–		4	–	4	–	0
Marshall		–		4	–	4	–	0
Duke		–		4	–	5	–	0
Western Kentucky State Normal		–		4	–	5	–	0
East Tennessee State Normal		–		3	–	4	–	1
Loyola (LA)		–		3	–	4	–	2
Abilene Christian		–		3	–	4	–	2
Louisville		–		3	–	5	–	1
Georgia Normal		–		1	–	2	–	0
Southwestern		–		3	–	6	–	0
Union (TN)		–		3	–	6	–	0
Richmond		–		2	–	6	–	1
Catholic University		–		1	–	5	–	2
Navy		–		2	–	6	–	0
Middle Tennessee State Normal		–		1	–	5	–	0
West Tennessee State Normal		–		1	–	7	–	1
Delaware State		–		0	–	1	–	0

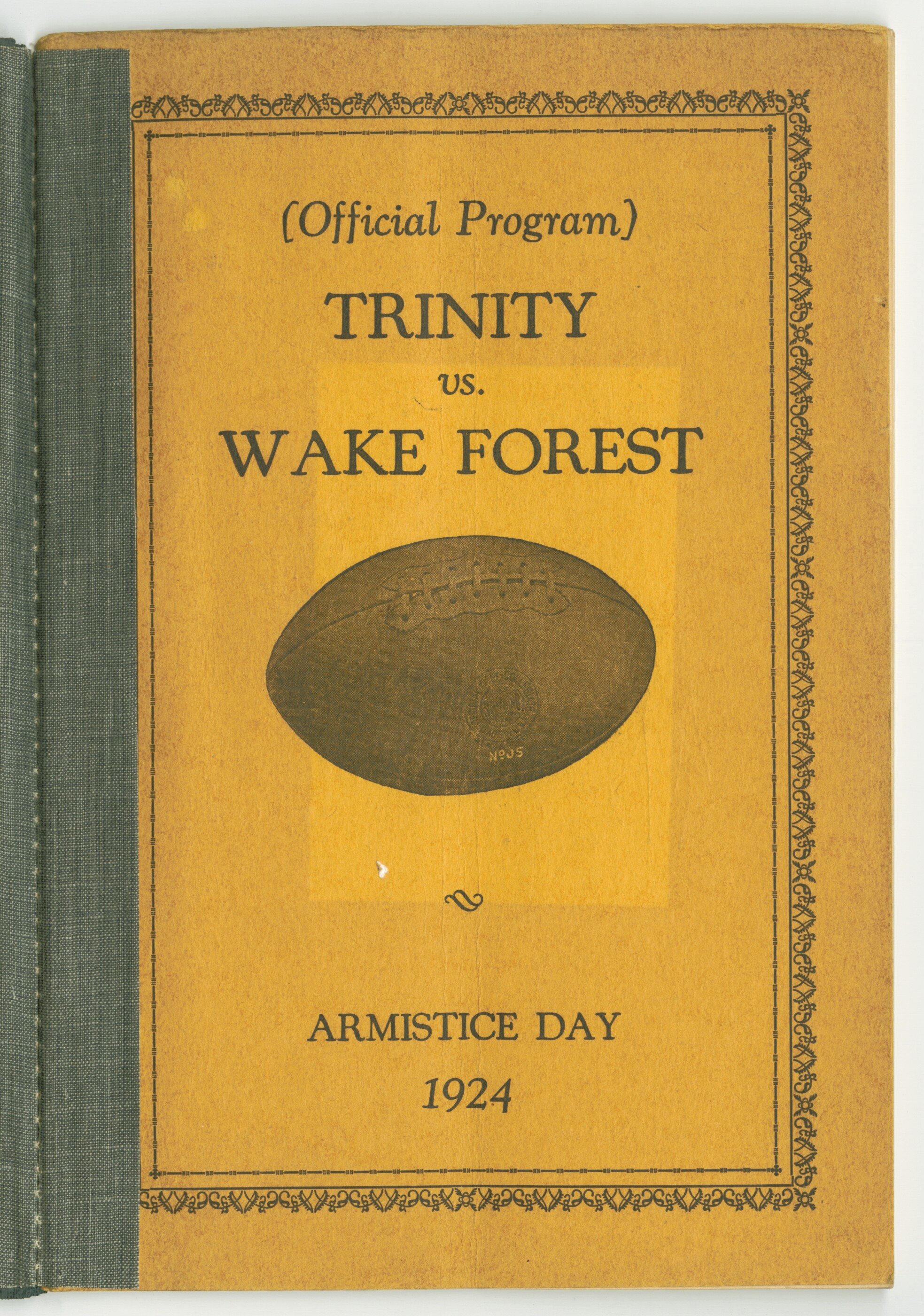
The cover of an American football game of Trinity College (now known as Duke University).

The 1924 Wake Forest Demon Deacons football team was an American football team that represented Wake Forest University during the 1924 college football season. In its second season under head coach Hank Garrity, the team compiled a 7–2 record.

== Schedule ==
Date	Opponent	Site	Result	Attendance	Source
September 27	North Carolina	Gore Field; Wake Forest, NC (rivalry)	W 7–6	3,000	
October 11	at Washington and Lee	Wilson Field; Lexington, VA	W 10–8		
October 18	vs. Florida	Plant Field; Tampa, FL	L 0–34		
October 25	vs. Lynchburg	Jackson Park; Danville, VA	W 37–7		
November 1	Guilford	Gore Field; Wake Forest, NC	W 67–0		
November 11	at Duke	Hanes Field; Durham, NC (rivalry)	W 32–0	7,000	
November 15	Elon	Gore Field; Wake Forest, NC	W 42–0		
November 22	at NC State	Riddick Stadium; Raleigh, NC (rivalry)	W 12–0	6,000	
November 27	at South Carolina	University Field; Columbia, SC	L 0–7		
