= Thompson Stadium =

Former football stadium at the United States Naval Academy

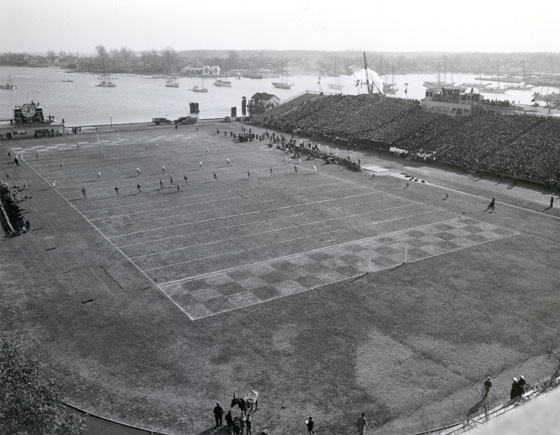
- Looking south at 1942 Army–Navy Game, the third and most recent at Annapolis
- Interactive map of Thompson Stadium
- Full name: Robert Means Thompson Stadium
- Location: United States Naval Academy; Annapolis, Maryland
- Coordinates: 38.9786°N 76.483°W
- Owner: United States Naval Academy
- Operator: United States Naval Academy
- Capacity: 12,000
- Surface: Natural grass

Construction
- Built: 1914; 112 years ago
- Opened: 1914
- Demolished: early 1980s (~44 years ago)

Tenant
- Navy Midshipmen (NCAA) (1924–1958)

Annapolis (the United States)
Annapolis (Maryland)

Robert Means Thompson Stadium was an American football stadium in the eastern United States, located on the campus of the United States Naval Academy in Annapolis, Maryland. Constructed in 1914, it was the home stadium of the Navy Midshipmen from 1924 through 1958, and was named after alumnus Robert Means Thompson (1849–1930). He created or led several athletically-based organizations at the academy until his death. It was succeeded by the larger Navy–Marine Corps Memorial Stadium in 1959, the current venue of Navy football.

Before its conversion to a football stadium, the Thompson Stadium site was an unused area on the south end campus, near the water of Annapolis Harbor. Work on the stadium began in 1914, and was finished later the same year. The seating capacity was 12,000, and it underwent few changes during its entire use. It was surrounded by a regulation quarter-mile (402 m) running track, and only had a single seating section, along the southwest sideline. The field had a northwest-southeast alignment, at an elevation slightly above sea level.

During the 1940s, the Naval Academy began to look for options to construct a new, larger football stadium. The school's directors collected money to build the stadium, for which much support was given by the public, due to the lack of seating at Thompson Stadium. Construction on the new stadium began in 1958 and it opened in September 1959. Use of Thompson Stadium ended for varsity games, but it remained until the early 1980s, when it was replaced by Lejeune Hall, the venue for USNA water sports.

== Name ==
From its origins until 1931, Thompson Stadium went without a name, and was referred to on maps as simply "Football Field." That year on May 30, the stadium was formally dedicated as the Robert Means Thompson Stadium, for the benefactor and alumnus of the Naval Academy. Born in March 1849, Thompson graduated from the Naval Academy as part of the class of 1868. He was commissioned as an officer in the Navy in 1869, but retired two years later to pursue a career in law. After leaving the navy, Thompson became active in helping with the athletics program at the academy, donating the Thompson Cup, an award given to the academy's athlete with the greatest improvement throughout the course of the season. In addition, he served as the head of several Naval Academy organizations and founded the Naval Academy Athletic Association.

== History ==
The Naval Academy's football team played their first game 147 years ago in 1879, an away game against the Baltimore Athletic Club, which ended in a scoreless tie. The Navy football team, not yet known as the "midshipmen," did not have an official stadium. For the duration of the 1880s, during which the squads obtained a record of thirteen wins, twelve losses, and two ties, the football squads most likely played home games on an unused drill or parade field. From the beginning of the 1890s until 1924, a period in which the Navy squads finished with an overall record of 202–82–23 (.695), the football team used Worden Field, a large multi-use athletic field for their home games.
