= 1924 Louisville Cardinals football team =

American college football season

1924 Louisville Cardinals football
- Conference: Independent
- Record: 3–5–1
- Head coach: Fred Enke (2nd season)
- Home stadium: Parkway Field

1924 Southern college football independents records
	Conf.			Overall
Team	W	L	T	W		L		T
Stetson		–		6	–	0	–	0
Quantico Marines		–		7	–	0	–	1
Tennessee Docs		–		9	–	1	–	0
Centenary		–		8	–	1	–	0
West Virginia		–		8	–	1	–	0
West Virginia Wesleyan		–		9	–	2	–	0
Davidson		–		7	–	2	–	1
Wake Forest		–		7	–	2	–	0
George Washington		–		6	–	3	–	1
William & Mary		–		5	–	2	–	1
Delaware		–		4	–	3	–	1
Texas Mines		–		3	–	2	–	1
Mississippi State Teachers		–		3	–	3	–	2
Birmingham–Southern		–		4	–	4	–	1
Spring Hill		–		4	–	4	–	1
Georgetown		–		4	–	4	–	0
Marshall		–		4	–	4	–	0
Duke		–		4	–	5	–	0
Western Kentucky State Normal		–		4	–	5	–	0
East Tennessee State Normal		–		3	–	4	–	1
Loyola (LA)		–		3	–	4	–	2
Abilene Christian		–		3	–	4	–	2
Louisville		–		3	–	5	–	1
Georgia Normal		–		1	–	2	–	0
Southwestern		–		3	–	6	–	0
Union (TN)		–		3	–	6	–	0
Richmond		–		2	–	6	–	1
Catholic University		–		1	–	5	–	2
Navy		–		2	–	6	–	0
Middle Tennessee State Normal		–		1	–	5	–	0
West Tennessee State Normal		–		1	–	7	–	1
Delaware State		–		0	–	1	–	0

The 1924 Louisville Cardinals football team was an American football team that represented the University of Louisville as an independent during the 1924 college football season. In their second and final season under head coach Fred Enke, the Cardinals compiled a 3–5–1 record.

== Schedule ==
Date	Opponent	Site	Result	Source
October 4	at Kentucky	Stoll Field; Lexington, KY (rivalry)	L 0–29	
October 11	Western Kentucky State Normal	Louisville, KY	W 12–7	
October 18	at Georgetown (KY)	Georgetown, KY	W 9–6	
October 25	Transylvania	Louisville, KY	L 0–3	
November 1	at Rose Poly	Terre Haute, IN	L 6–18	
November 8	at Kentucky Wesleyan	Owensboro, KY	T 0–0	
November 15	King	Louisville, KY	L 0–16	
November 22	Chattanooga	Parkway Field; Louisville, KY	W 10–0	
November 27	at Marshall	Huntington, WV	L 6–16	
