= 1924 Centenary Gentlemen football team =

American college football season

1924 Centenary Gentlemen football
- Conference: Louisiana Intercollegiate Athletic Association
- Record: 8–1 (3–0 LIAA)
- Head coach: Bo McMillin (3rd season)

The 1924 Centenary Gentlemen football team represented the Centenary College of Louisiana during the 1924 college football season. Players included Cal Hubbard and Swede Anderson. The team posted an 8–1 record, including an upset win over Frank Cavanaugh's Boston College team.

== Schedule ==
Date	Opponent	Site	Result	Attendance	Source
October 4	Loyola (LA)	Centenary Athletic Field; Shreveport, LA	W 51–0	4,000	
October 11	Trinity (TX)	Centenary Athletic Field; Shreveport, LA	W 13–7		
October 18	at Butler	Irwin Field; Indianapolis, IN	W 9–7		
October 25	Tennessee Docs	Centenary Athletic Field; Shreveport, LA	L 6–7	6,000	
October 31	at Howard Payne	Brownwood, TX	W 20–10		
November 8	Central State Teachers	Louisiana State Fairgrounds; Shreveport, LA	W 7–6		
November 15	Boston College	Braves Field; Boston, MA	W 10–9	12,000	
November 27	at Saint Louis	St. Louis University Athletic Field; St. Louis, MO	W 23–13		
December 4	Lombard	Centenary Athletic Field; Shreveport, LA	W 38–0	1,800	
