= History of Tulane Green Wave football =

The Tulane Green Wave football team represents Tulane University in the sport of American football.

== Overview ==
=== Early history (1890–1970) ===
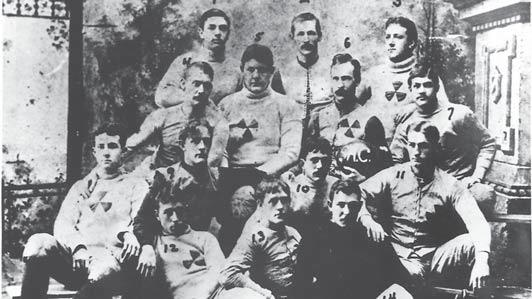
1893 Tulane Olive and Blue

Tulane's earliest athletic traditions are tied to its football team. Football was introduced to Tulane by Hugh and Thomas Bayne, who played the game at Yale University. The first organized game was played on New Year's Day in 1890 by dividing students into two teams, and this became the first football game in New Orleans or Louisiana. Tulane began playing intercollegiate football in 1893, beating LSU in the state's first intercollegiate contest.

The 1895 team joined the Southern Intercollegiate Athletic Association (SIAA), the first southern athletics conference. The 1896 game against SIAA champion LSU was forfeited during the game due to Tulane having fielded an ineligible player. At the time that the game was declared forfeit, Tulane was leading with a score of 2–0. LSU was once moving the ball toward the goal line when a Tulane player named Depleche was injured. The injured player was replaced by George H. Brooke. LSU ran another play and gained 5 yards before realizing the identity of this substitute Tulane player. After a lengthy debate, the referee ruled that Brooke could not play, and that Tulane forfeited the game by refusing to play without him. Dr. William Dudley, of the SIAA, later ruled that the game referee was right to declare the game forfeited. Tulane did not field a team in 1897, due to being banned from intercollegiate play by the SIAA's commissioner, Dr. Dudley. This sanction was laid down in response to 1896 incident in which Tulane was forced to forfeit a game to LSU due to fielding an ineligible player. The 1899 team lost to the "iron men" of Sewanee. The "Olive and Blue" hit its stride in 1900 with a perfect 5–0 season and SIAA co-championship, beating the Southern Athletic Club, Alabama, Millsaps, LSU, and Ole Miss. The team failed to win a game in 1905 or 1906. The 1908 team lost only to Baylor. Rival LSU went undefeated, and Tulane accused LSU of using professional players. The 1909 team played in the Bacardi Bowl, and the 1910 team went winless. In a 1912 game against Southwestern Louisiana, Tulane set school records of 15 rushing touchdowns and 95 points that still stand today.

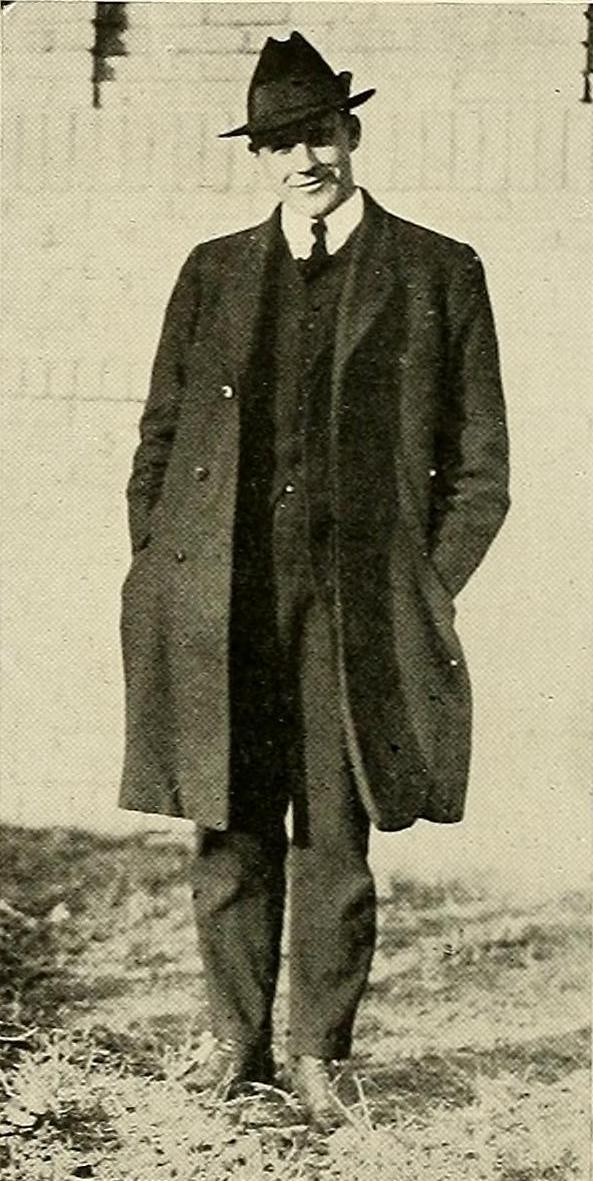
Shaughnessy in his first season at Tulane.

In 1915 Tulane hired coach Clark Shaughnessy, who would lead the team to then unparalleled success. Though he was famous for later using the T formation, at Tulane he employed the single wing. Shaughnessy also introduced to Tulane the Minnesota shift, an innovation created by his former coach Henry L. Williams. By 1919, Shaughnessy had transformed Tulane into a competitor among Southern collegiate teams. That season, he guided them to a then-school record of seven consecutive wins. In 1920, Germany Schulz was hired to take over duties as athletic director, The 1920 team tied for the SIAA championship, and was the first called the "Green Wave", after a song titled "The Rolling Green Wave". By 1922, Tulane joined the Southern Conference (SoCon). In 1925 the Green Wave went undefeated, shutting out 6 out of 10 opponents, with only a tie against Missouri to blemish its record. The team's backfield included Lester Lautenschlaeger, Brother Brown, and Peggy Flournoy. Coach Shaughnessy said Brown was the best player he ever coached. The administration declined a Rose Bowl invitation at the end of that season, however, in order to keep their student-athletes in class. 1926 saw the completion of a new stadium on campus, Tulane Stadium, dedicated to the 1925 team.

Former assistant coach Bernie Bierman, who had been head coach at Mississippi State for two years, returned to Tulane to replace Shaughnessy as head football coach for the 1927 season. Although Bierman was ultimately to lead Tulane football to its greatest heights, his first season ended with a 2–5–1 record. It marked the first time the Green Wave suffered back-to-back losing seasons since 1905-06 and it did not happen again until 1945–46. The Green Wave defeated Ole Miss in the season opener and LSU in the season finale for its only two wins that fall. Bierman thought of ditching his single-wingback formation after the 32–0 loss to Vanderbilt, and was convinced to keep it by Vandy coach Dan McGugin. It was a dark period for a program used to better times, but the seed of future success was present in halfback Bill Banker, who was to help Tulane back to football prosperity very quickly. Tulane's third and fourth perfect regular seasons came in 1929 and 1931, with a single loss to Northwestern in Chicago marring the 1930 campaign. The 1931 team did go to the Rose Bowl, losing 21–12 to Southern California, and Jerry Dalrymple became the only unanimous All-American selection that year.

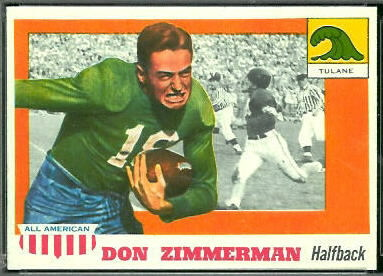
Don Zimmerman

In 1932 Tulane chartered the Southeastern Conference (SEC) along with 12 other colleges and universities. Ted Cox, an assistant to Bernie Bierman since 1927, took over the head coaching reins and the winning tradition continued. All-American Don Zimmerman was a leader on both sides of the ball as he ended his Tulane career as Tulane's all-time leader in total offense and passes intercepted, setting records that lasted until the 1970s. The Green Wave beat some big-time football teams in spite of being hard hit by graduation, but finishing 6–2–1 was considered a definite "rebuilding" effort for the Tulane program of that day. The Green Wave lost to LSU for the first time since 1926. The 1934 team tied for the SEC championship. In 1935 Tulane began hosting the Sugar Bowl in Tulane Stadium, an annual contest that eventually lent its name to the stadium itself. Coach Red Dawson's first Tulane team finished 6–3–1 and started the tradition of strong defense that was the hallmark of his tenure. Six of 1936's opponents were held to less than 10 points. That season, Tulane and Auburn played the first of three consecutive scoreless ties. A four-game winning streak at mid-year was the season highlight, but the team took another thumping (33–0) from LSU at the end. Dawson went national in his recruiting and began to bring in players that would lead Tulane football back to national prominence. In 1939 the team completed its fifth unbeaten season, losing a close 14–13 battle to Texas A&M in the Sugar Bowl. Dawson left Tulane after the 1941 season to accept the head football coach position at Pittsburgh.

Coach Henry Frnka moved to Tulane to take over the football program after leading Tulsa to four bowl bids, including two to the Sugar Bowl. The initial results were disappointing, but Frnka was laying a foundation that would produce significant success for the Green Wave in the late 1940s. One of the keys to that foundation was New Orleanian Eddie Price, just out of the Navy and about to become one of the most feared rushers in college football. Price played sparingly early in his freshman year, but still led Tulane in rushing with 309 yards. The 1946 team ended with a 3–7 record as military veterans like Bennie Ellender, O.J. Key, Ken Tarzetti, Vic Klein and Don Fortier returned to campus to help Frnka rebuild Tulane football fortunes.

In 1951, believing that athletics had begun to overshadow academics, University President Rufus Harris voluntarily lowered Tulane's football scholarships to 75 from 100 and reduced coaches' salaries, among other changes. After that season, Frnka resigned as head football coach. His final record at Tulane is 31–23–4. Former North Carolina and Florida head coach Raymond Wolf replaced Henry Frnka as head coach and rallied the squad from a 1–3 start to end up 5–5. The offensive highlight of the season was a 46–14 romp over Louisiana College that saw quarterback Fred Dempsey throw five TD passes. In that game, Tulane rushed for 240 yards and passed for 219. Max McGee led Tulane rushers for the second straight season, but Roy Bailey had some bright moments, rushing for 127 yards against Mississippi State and 121 yards against Vanderbilt. Coach Wolf's brief tenure came to an end after a 1–8–1 record. Led by Max McGee's 132 yards, Tulane rushed for 432 yards and demolished The Citadel 54–6 in the season opener. The team did not win another game. The austerity program limiting football scholarships that was announced during the last year of the Henry Frnka regime was beginning to be felt on the scoreboard. McGee ended the season as the squad's leading rusher for the third year in a row. Wolf's final record with the Green Wave is 6–13–1. Jim Pittman took over the coaching reins for 1966, a historic and memorable season for Tulane football. Tulane left the SEC in 1966 to become an independent. Tulane also went intersectional with its schedule in 1966 and turned in Tulane's only winning team of the decade. Backfield coach Joe Blaylock turned the Tulane wing-T offense into a showcase for the athletic ability of junior quarterback Bobby Duhon, whose 748 yards rushing are the most ever by a Green Wave signal caller. Tulane had failed to score in its three previous season openers, but it was the Green Wave defense that pitched the shutout in the 1966 opener as the Green Wave shut out Virginia Tech 13–0. The next weekend, Duhon scored twice and defensive guard Vic Eumont scored another TD when he recovered a fumble in the Texas A&M end zone as Tulane beat the Aggies 21–13. Tulane was off to its first 2–0 start since 1949, and the record became a heady 4–1 when, after a loss to Stanford, the Green Wave whipped Virginia and Cincinnati. Against Cincy, Tulane rushed for 387 yards as halfback Pete Johns gained 193 and Duhon added 103 and a pair of TDs. Tailback/defensive back Johns and tight end/defensive end Colquette were two-way performers, among the last of a dying breed as college football went to unlimited substitution. The Green Wave got its fifth win with a fourth-quarter goal-line stand against Vanderbilt, then fought heavily favored Miami to a 10–10 tie to ensure a winning season (the last tie in Tulane history). In the season finale, 83,000 fans packed Tulane Stadium to watch LSU win a hotly contested game in the fourth quarter as both teams finished 5–4–1.

Reality returned to Tulane football in 1967, as the previous season's resurgence to respectability was followed by a downward slide to 3–7. Coach Jim Pittman's second Tulane squad was again competitive, but the football began bouncing the wrong way and a lack of depth spelled defeat in several close contests. Midway through the season, junior Warren Bankston moved from backup quarterback to running back and led all Wave rushers. Quarterback Bobby Duhon, who went on to a fine NFL career as a running back with the New York Giants, became the first Tulane player to amass better than 1,000 yards of total offense in three straight seasons. The defense sustained a hit midway through the season when co-captain Jim Jancik, a stellar defensive back, went down with a knee injury. That fall, Tulane Stadium had a new tenant as the Green Wave shared its home turf with a new NFL team, the New Orleans Saints. The record slipped again to 2–8 in 1968, but Coach Pittman was bringing in recruits such as Rick Kingrea and Ray Hester who would one day be the keys to a big turnaround. Running back Warren Bankston, who went on to a long NFL career as a tight end with the Oakland Raiders, led the team in rushing despite missing several early season games with an injury to the leg. Quarterback Wayne Francingues' 1,376 yards of total offense were the second highest in Green Wave football history to that point. In a wild 63–47 loss to Virginia, Francingues rushed for 147 yards, at the time the most ever by a Tulane quarterback. The Green Wave's 1969 record barely improved to 3–7, but Pittman and his staff's recruiting efforts began to pay off as a strong sophomore class headed by three-year starters like Steve Barrios, Joe Bullard, Paul Ellis, David Hebert and Bob Waldron moved up to varsity play. After an 0–4 start, the team broke even the rest of the way, beating Pittsburgh, Georgia Tech and Vanderbilt. Bullard established himself as Tulane's all-time best punt returner that fall, setting season records for yards and average per return that have not been approached. His 92-yard return against Vanderbilt is the longest in Green Wave history. With Barrios as his favorite target, sophomore Rusty Lachaussee became Tulane's first 1,000-yard passer. The defensive unit that would dominate opponents and catapult Tulane to its first bowl bid in over 30 years was beginning to come together, as junior linebackers Rick Kingrea and Ray Hester got better and better. Tulane got better and better right along with them. The 1970 football season, according to billboards and bumper stickers plastered all over the New Orleans area, was going to be the "Year of the Green." Tulane's football team backed up the claim, earning a bid to the Liberty Bowl where they defeated Colorado. Coach Pittman's final Tulane football team compiled an 8–4 mark, the most wins for the Green Wave since 1948 and only the second winning season for the program in 14 years. Seniors Rick Kingrea, Mike Walker (defensive tackle) and David Abercrombie captained the 1970 team to considerable success. The Tulane defense returned 10 starters from 1969, and sophomore linebacker Glenn Harder came up to the varsity to fill the remaining spot on what was to be one of the Green Wave's all-time great defensive units. Paul Ellis, Joe Bullard and David Hebert formed a secondary that led the way to a school-record 28 interceptions. Offensively, tailback David Abercrombie set a school record with 246 yards rushing against NC State, and his 993 yards rushing that fall has been surpassed only by Eddie Price. Through the air, quarterback Mike Walker and receiver Steve Barrios connected on some big plays, as Walker set a season record for yardage gained per completion and Barrios set a season record for yards gained per reception. The NCAA went to the 11 game schedule that fall, and Tulane finished the regular season 7–4. After the regular season, the Green Wave received its first bowl invite since the Sugar Bowl beckoned the 1939 team. The opponent was a massive, talented Colorado team that had demolished Alabama in the Liberty Bowl the year before. Tulane was given little chance against a team averaging over 400 yards of total offense per game, but the Green Wave defense limited the Buffaloes to 175 yards. Abercrombie ran wild on a bright, chilly Memphis afternoon, and, as it turned out, it was Colorado who had no chance to win. The final score of 17–3 made it sound closer than it really was. The week after the game, it was announced that Jim Pittman had decided to accept an offer to become head football coach at TCU in 1971.

=== Bennie Ellender era (1971–1975) ===
Bennie Ellender returned to his alma mater as head coach, fresh from leading Arkansas State to a college division national championship in 1970. The Green Wave returned quite a few good football players from the previous season's Liberty Bowl champions and excitement ran high. The results, unfortunately, did not match those expectations as Tulane lost its last five games to finish 3–8. Ellender did not lose a season opener in his five years as head coach at Tulane, and Texas Tech was his first victim as sophomore defensive end Mike Truax blocked a fourth-quarter punt to spark a come-from-behind victory. The Green Wave dropped its next three games, then rallied back to beat North Carolina and Pittsburgh to even the season record before going into a five-game slide. Senior wide receiver Steve Barrios missed the first four games with a shoulder injury, but his return against North Carolina gave the Wave an obvious boost as he caught touchdown passes of 56 and 42 yards. The next weekend, Barrios became the first Tulane receiver to gain 1,000 career yards as he caught three passes for 76 yards in a 33–8 win over Pitt. Running back Ricky Hebert rushed for 819 yards, most ever by a Tulane sophomore, highlighted by a 124-yard performance against LSU. Tulane had two 100-yard returns that fall on an interception by David Hebert against Rice and a kickoff by Coleman Dupre against North Carolina.

Tenacious defense and the emergence of sophomore quarterback Steve Foley put Bennie Ellender's second Tulane team back in the win column in 1972, and the 6–5 record could have been a lot better. One of those "losses" came when Miami was inadvertently awarded a fifth down with barely over a minute left in the game, which they used to score the winning touchdown. Another loss came in the season finale when Tulane fullback was stopped a foot short of the winning TD as time expired. Defensive back George Ewing accomplished more in 1972 than most players do in a whole career. Despite losing two games to injury at midseason, Ewing scored five TDs in 1972, bringing back three punt returns and two interceptions for scores. The Green Wave's 1972 defense was one of the best in the school's history, as six opponents scored fewer than 10 points. Glenn Harder, Mike Mullen, Harold Asher and Rusty Chambers gave Tulane one of its deepest linebacking corps ever, while sensational sophomore Charles Hall provided a dominating presence up front. Defensive end Randy Lee and safety David Lee were also key factors that fall, providing Tulane with one of the most effective brother combinations in its first 100 years of football. Freshmen became eligible for varsity play in 1972 and middle guard Mark Olivari, wide receiver Jaime Garza and running back Steve Treuting made a huge contribution that fall.

Ellender fielded his most successful football team in 1973, as quarterback Steve Foley and All-America defensive tackle Charles Hall led the way to a 9–2 regular season and an invitation to the Astro-Bluebonnet Bowl in Houston. The Green Wave won its first six games for the school's best start since 1934, but the highlight of the year was the season finale with LSU. In that game, the Green Wave beat the Tigers for the first time since 1948, taking a 14–0 win before a beyond-capacity crowd of 86,598 in old Tulane Stadium. Foley led the 1973 team in both passing and rushing and was named MVP at season's end. Foley ran for two TDs in the season opener with Boston College, broke a 72-yard TD run to start off a rout over VMI, threw the winning TD pass with nine seconds left against Duke and scampered for 181 yards (the most ever by a Tulane QB) against Vanderbilt to clinch the bowl bid. Hall and sophomore middle guard Mark Olivari created havoc in the middle of the defensive line and junior linebacker Rusty Chambers made 153 tackles as five opponents were held to six points or less. The defense shut out VMI, North Carolina and LSU that fall. It was a year to remember, as only the 1931 and 1934 teams won more games in one season. The bowl game against Houston was one Tulane would rather forget, as an explosive Cougar squad romped 47–7.

The Green Wave got off to another strong start in 1974, but this time the roof fell in after the winning streak ended. With senior quarterback Steve Foley continuing his inspired play from the season before, Coach Bennie Ellender's fourth Tulane team roared off to a 5–0 start. The fifth win was by 30–3 over The Citadel, as Foley ran for 142 of the team's 340 rushing yards. At this point, Ellender had coached Tulane to 17 wins in its last 20 regular season games. Game six was a regionally televised game against the Georgia Tech team in Atlanta, and Foley appeared to be driving Tulane toward a go-ahead score early in the second half when he broke his foot on a goal-line scramble. Tulane did not win another game that season and ended up 5–6, a dramatic indication of the value a healthy Steve Foley brought to the Green Wave football program. On a cold, damp Nov. 30 afternoon the Green Wave played its last game ever in Tulane Stadium, dropping a 26–10 decision to Ole Miss.

Coach Ellender's final Tulane team got off to another strong start, but this time a late season losing streak cost him his job. Ellender retooled his offense for the 1975 season to take advantage of the strong throwing arm of quarterback Terry Looney, one of the heroes of the Green Wave's win over LSU in 1973. Looney went down with a season-ending knee injury a week before the season opener. Tulane won that season opener anyway, defeating Ole Miss 14–3 in the first college game played in the Louisiana Superdome. Tulane got off to a 4–2 start that fall as seldom-used senior Buddy Gilbert took over the quarterback job and delivered. Gilbert established season records for passes completed and yards gained passing. His most productive receiver was senior Jaime Garza, who led Tulane in receiving for the third consecutive season. After a 4–2 start that included wins over Clemson, Ole Miss, West Virginia and Boston College, the Green Wave lost five in a row to finish 4–7. The squad remained competitive during that streak, losing a one-point decision to Air Force and a two-point decision to North Carolina on a last-second field goal. The season ended unpleasantly, however, as LSU topped the Green Wave 42–6. The following week, Ellender, the winningest coach at Tulane in a quarter-century, was fired. Ellender's final record as Tulane's head coach is 27–29.

=== Larry Smith era (1976–1979) ===
After the firing of Bennie Ellender, Tulane hired Larry Smith as head coach in 1976. His first team went 2–9, then improved over the following years to 3–8 and 4–7. Smith's Green Wave teams experienced a break-out year in 1979: Tulane opened the season defeating #13 Stanford and later defeated #19 SMU. In the regular season finale, Tulane defeated rival LSU, 24–13, in the Louisiana Superdome; the crowd of 73,496 remains the highest attendance to see the Green Wave play at the Superdome. Tulane ended the regular season with a 9–2 record, ranked #15 and was invited to play in the 1979 Liberty Bowl. Its first bowl game in six years, Tulane lost to Penn State, 9–6, but Smith's ability to finish the season 9–3 attracted attention and he was hired away by Arizona. Smith's tenure with Tulane ended with a 17–27 record. Under his guidance, ten Tulane players earned All-America honors, including two-time All-Americans quarterback Roch Hontas and kicker Eddie Murray as well as offensive tackle Eric Laakso and tight end Rodney Holman. Six of his Tulane players entered the NFL.

=== Vince Gibson era (1980–1982) ===
From 1980 to 1982, Vince Gibson, who came from Louisville, took over as head coach at Tulane, posting an overall record of 17–17. Gibson defeated LSU in two out of his three seasons at Tulane and also coached the Green Wave to an appearance in the Hall of Fame Bowl in Birmingham, Alabama. While at Tulane, Gibson was known as "Vegas Vince" for his risk taking play calling.

=== Wally English era (1983–1984) ===
Wally English, previously an assistant with the NFL's Miami Dolphins, took over the Tulane head coaching position in 1983, beginning a controversial two-year reign. The day before the 1983 season opener with Mississippi State, Jon English, Wally's son, filed suit in district court in New Orleans against the NCAA and Tulane, alleging that he was unjustly being deprived of a final season of eligibility. He asked for and received a temporary restraining order that allowed him to play while the case worked its way through the court process, and he got to play six games before his attorneys ran out of legal maneuvers and he was declared ineligible. The two games that Tulane won while Jon English played were forfeited to Ole Miss and Florida State, and the Green Wave wound up with a 2–9 record. Future NFL performers like Bubby Brister, Don Maggs, Ron Tilton and Burnell Dent dotted the roster. Brister left the team after being replaced by Jon English midway through the first two games of the season. The 1983 team lost a lot of close games and was beaten by two TDs only once all season. Dent set a new Tulane record for tackles in a season with 172 that fall to register the most impressive individual performance.

Coach English led the Green Wave to a 3–8 record in his final season as head coach, defeating Vanderbilt, Southern Miss and Memphis State. Ken Karcher, a transfer from Notre Dame, took over the starting quarterback spot. His favorite target was sophomore tight end Larry Route, who led the squad with 46 catches. Mike Jones led the team in rushing with 573 yards, including 129 in the season finale with LSU. Linebacker Burnell Dent led the team in tackles again, this time with 139. The rivalry game against LSU was called off with less than a minute remaining when a bench-clearing brawl broke out between the teams on an extra point attempt. English's two-year tenure ended the following week when Tulane announced it would fire English and seek a new head coach. English's final record at Tulane is 7–15.

=== Mack Brown era (1985–1987) ===
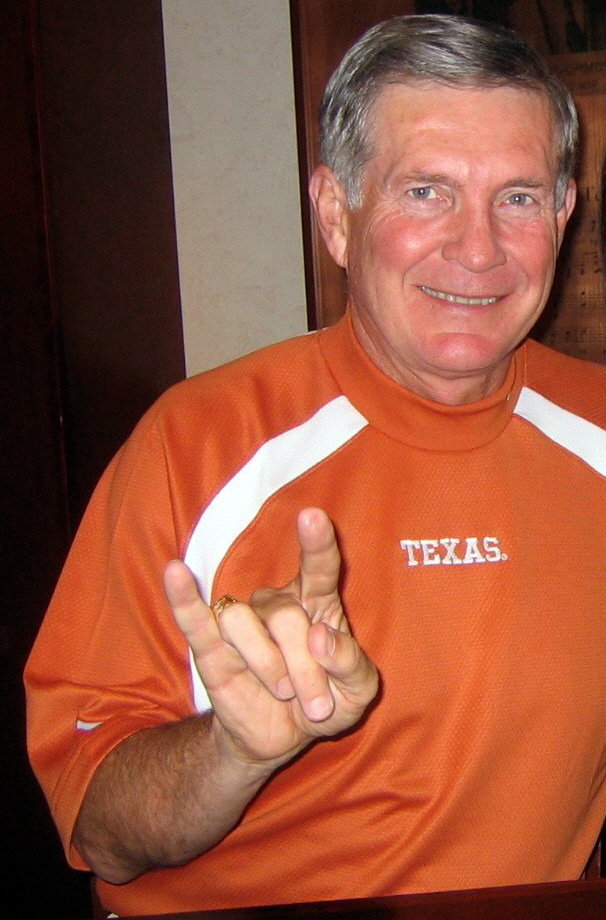
Coach Brown

To replace English, Tulane hired Oklahoma offensive coordinator Mack Brown as head football coach. In 1987, after seasons with yearly records of 1–10 and 4–7, the Green Wave finished 6–6 under Coach Brown before losing to Washington 24–12 in the Independence Bowl. The Green Wave that season were led by dynamic quarterback Terrence Jones and wide receiver Marc Zeno. Brown left Tulane after three seasons for the head coaching position at North Carolina. His final record as head coach of the Green Wave is 11–23.

=== Greg Davis era (1988–1991) ===
Brown was succeeded at Tulane by his offensive coordinator, Greg Davis. Davis failed to garner a winning season at Tulane and was fired in 1991 following a 1–10 campaign. His yearly records were 5–6, 4–8, 4–7 and 1–10 for a total of 14–31.

=== Buddy Teevens era (1992–1996) ===
Dartmouth head coach Buddy Teevens was hired to turn the Green Wave program around, but he too failed to muster a winning season during his tenure at Tulane. Tulane recruited Barron Collier HS quarterback Matt Cammuso in 1994, who had also been scouted by West Virginia and North Carolina State. In 1995, Tulane left the ranks of the independents and joined a new all-sports league called Conference USA, formed by the merger of the Metro Conference, the non-football conference it belonged to at the time, and the Great Midwest Conference. Teevens was fired after the 1996 season. His final record as head coach of the Green Wave is 10–46.

=== Tommy Bowden era (1997–1998) ===
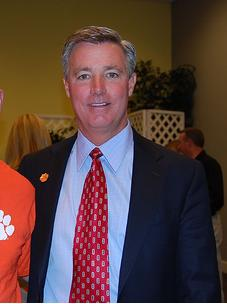
Coach Bowden

The 1997 football season at Tulane started fresh with a new head coach, Auburn offensive coordinator Tommy Bowden. Using players recruited during the Teevens era, Bowden's first season produced a 7–4 season, the Wave's first winning regular season since 1987; however, the Green Wave did not participate in a bowl game that year. The dramatic turnaround was only a preview of what was to come in Bowden's second year as coach. In 1998, Tulane went undefeated for the first time since 1931. Quarterback Shaun King led the Green Wave to a 12–0 record, a Conference USA championship, and a final No. 7 national ranking. He played most of the season with a cast on his left wrist, which he broke in the third game. King also set the all-time NCAA passing efficiency record for quarterbacks, a record which, at 183.3, was not surpassed until 2006. Despite a perfect regular season, the Green Wave was not even considered for a BCS bowl game because it was felt they had not played a legitimate schedule. They only played one team from an automatic qualifying conference all season, and never played a ranked team. Nonetheless, this snub fueled questions about championships and revenue management in college football and caused Tulane's President Scott Cowen to demand reform of the system. Cowen's efforts eventually led to changes to the BCS, including allowing more post-season access for schools in non-automatic qualifying conferences.

Tulane players warm up for a game against Texas

Tommy Bowden departed Tulane with an 18–4 record to become head coach at Clemson after two seasons. The Green Wave completed a perfect 12–0 season with a 41–27 victory over BYU in the Liberty Bowl.

=== Chris Scelfo era (1998–2006) ===
Bowden was replaced by Georgia offensive line coach and South Louisiana native Chris Scelfo, who was chosen over popular Tulane offensive coordinator Rich Rodriguez, the architect of the devastating spread offense that averaged 45 points a game in 1998. Scelfo's tenure was highlighted by a 6–5 record in 2000 and a 2002 Hawaiʻi Bowl victory over Hawaiʻi, which completed an 8–5 overall season for the Green Wave. Unfortunately for Scelfo and Tulane fans, the 2002 season was the last winning season for the program until 2013. Mewelde Moore, a lightly recruited running back out of Baton Rouge, signed in 2000 and ultimately finished his four-year career as Tulane's all-time leading rusher with 6,505 career yards, surpassing the legendary Eddie Price. He set Tulane and C-USA records by running for 100 yards or more in 22 games. Moore was selected in the 4th round of the 2004 NFL draft by the Minnesota Vikings. Two other Tulane products, Patrick Ramsey and J. P. Losman, were selected in the first round of the 2002 and 2004 NFL drafts by the Washington Redskins and Buffalo Bills, respectively.

Scelfo and his staff guided Tulane football through a particularly difficult 2005 season, in which the program played its 11 games in 11 different stadiums because of its displacement and Tulane's temporary shuttering due to the effects of Hurricane Katrina. After returning to a normal 2006 home schedule in the Superdome and going 4–8, Scelfo was fired by the university. Scelfo finished his career at Tulane with a 37–57 overall record.

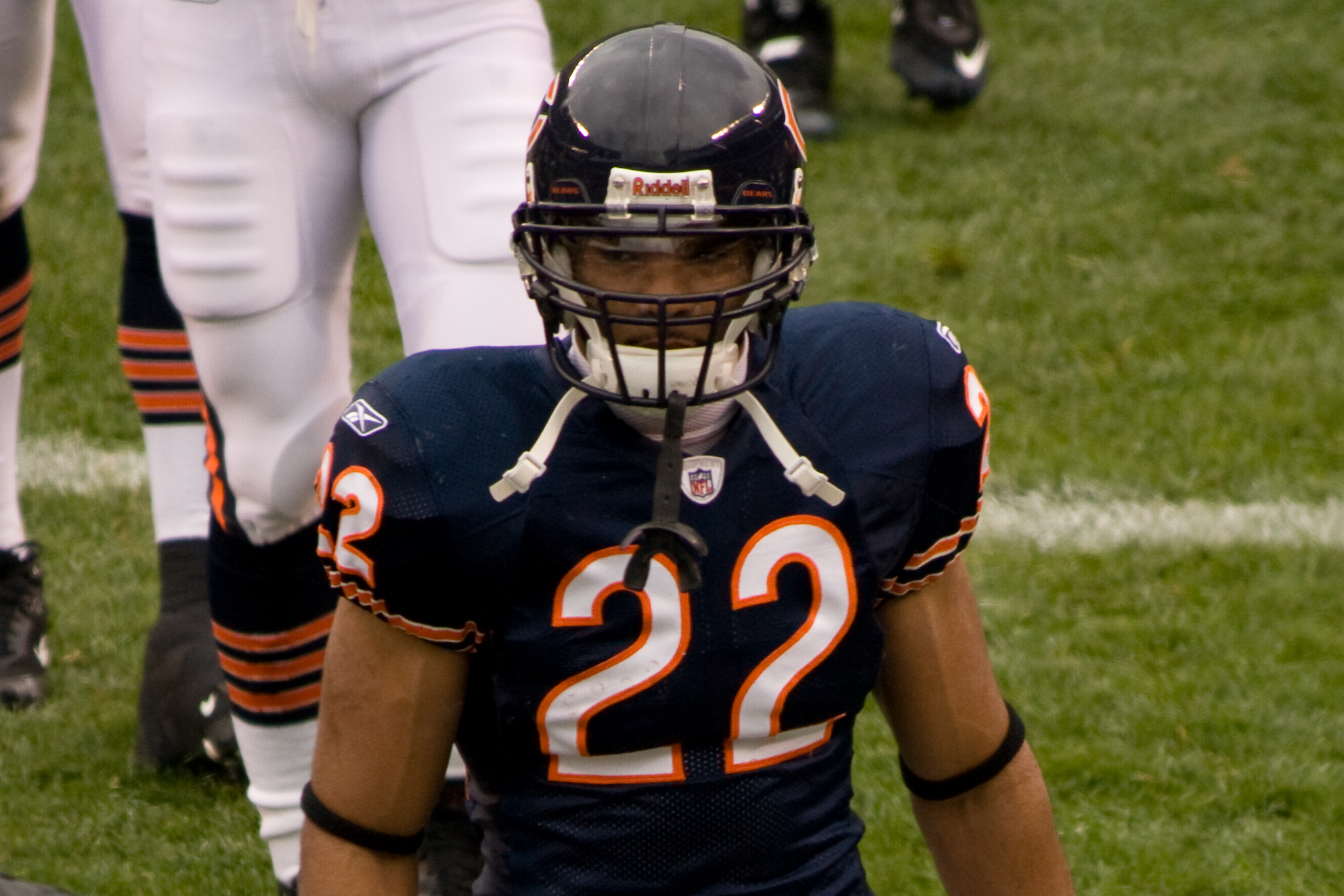
Tulane record-holder Matt Forté

=== Bob Toledo era (2007–2011) ===
Former UCLA Bruins head coach Bob Toledo was named head coach on December 11, 2006. Toledo compiled a 49–32 overall record while at UCLA from 1996 to 2002, which included a Pac-10 title in 1998 and a 20-game winning streak between the 1997 and 1998 seasons. Ironically, Toledo became head coach at a school whom he lost a prized recruit to: J. P. Losman signed with UCLA in 1999 but transferred following UCLA's Spring practice to play for Scelfo at Tulane.

The Green Wave finished 4–8 in Toledo's inaugural season, highlighted by the individual performance of running back Matt Forte, who shattered several Green Wave records on his way to rushing for 2,127 yards and 23 touchdowns. In 2007, Forté broke the 200-yard rushing barrier five times and the 300-yard barrier twice, which included a Tulane and Conference USA single-game-record 342 rushing yards against SMU. After compiling a 15–46 record, Toledo resigned during the 2011 season after a 2–5 start. Co-offensive coordinator Mark Hutson became interim head coach for the remaining 6 games, losing each of them.

=== Curtis Johnson era (2012–2015) ===
On December 5, 2011, New Orleans Saints wide receivers coach Curtis Johnson was introduced as the 38th head coach of Tulane football and the first African American head coach in the program's history. Four days later, with $40 million already raised, it was announced that the university was embarking on a $70 million fundraising campaign known as "Home Field Advantage." The campaign aimed to raise $60 million for construction of a new 30,000-seat stadium on the Uptown campus - to be opened by 2014 - and $10 million for the football program itself, to be put toward locker room, weight room, and academic advising upgrades. The stadium, Benson Field at Yulman Stadium, is now open. The following year, the university announced their move from Conference USA, of which they had been a member since 1995, to The American on July 1, 2014.

The Green Wave notched its 500th program win on October 5, 2013, a 24–21 homecoming victory over North Texas. Johnson led the Green Wave to a new on-campus era by securing the program's first winning season and bowl game since 2002, closing out the 2013 home schedule with a 45–3 victory over UTEP in Tulane's last scheduled regular-season game with the Superdome as the home field. The Green Wave went on to face UL-Lafayette in the New Orleans Bowl, a game the Green Wave lost 24–21. On November 28, 2015, Johnson was fired as Tulane's head coach.

=== Willie Fritz era (2016–2023) ===
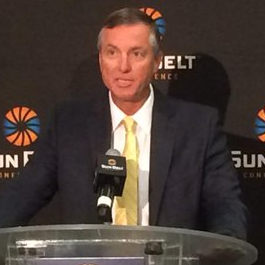
Coach Fritz

On December 11, 2015, Georgia Southern head coach Willie Fritz was hired to replace Curtis Johnson as head coach of the Green Wave. His first two seasons saw Tulane win nine combined games, which was actually a step up from the three wins in both of the two seasons prior to his arrival. On May 22, 2018, Tulane signed Fritz to a two-year contract extension through the 2023 season. The 2018 team went 6–6 in the regular season, winning five of the eight conference games to finish in a three-way tie for the AAC Western title, although they did not play in the AAC title game. They were invited to play in the 2018 Cure Bowl, the first bowl game for Tulane since 2013. They faced Louisiana and beat them 41–24 for the program's first bowl win since 2002. The next two seasons saw them finish with .500 records that saw them invited to bowl games, which meant Tulane went to a bowl game in three straight seasons for the first time ever, which resulted in a bowl win and loss. On September 14, 2020, Tulane signed Fritz to a contract extension through the 2027 season.

The 2022 season saw tremendous turnaround. The 2021 team won just two games, but the following season saw them match that total before the season was halfway over. The Wave lost just twice in regular season play, with one being against the UCF Knights at home. However, a victory over Cincinnati clinched a berth in the 2022 American Athletic Conference Football Championship Game, which they hosted. In the game, Tulane never trailed, keeping pace with UCF (who got as close as three points late) in an eventual 45–28 victory. It is the fifth conference title for Fritz as a coach (having done so for four separate teams) and it ranked as the first conference title for Tulane since 1998. Now ranked 14th in the AP Poll, they were selected as an at-large team to play the USC Trojans (ranked 8th in the polls) in the 2023 Cotton Bowl Classic, their first major bowl game since the 1940 Sugar Bowl. Tulane trailed for most of the game, which included being down by fifteen points with under five minutes to go in the game. But Tulane rallied with a quick touchdown and a stroke of luck in a subsequent safety to give them the ball with three minutes to play. Tulane drove 66 yards and converted multiple fourth down before scoring the go-ahead touchdown with nine seconds remaining. Tulane won by a final score of 46-45 for their first major bowl victory since 1935. The win was the 12th in the season, matching the 1998 team for most ever and setting a record for the best single-season improvement in NCAA football history. Following the 2023 season, Fritz left to become the new head coach at the University of Houston.

=== Jon Sumrall era (2024-present) ===
On December 8, 2023, Jon Sumrall was hired as the 42nd head coach of the Tulane Green Wave, replacing Fritz. The season started with a QB change as freshman Darian Mensah won the starting job over expected starter Ty Thompson. Tulane started the season with a resounding 52-0 win against the Southeastern Louisiana Lions, followed by a controversial one-point home loss to the Kansas State Wildcats, and a road loss to the Oklahoma Sooners. Following their 1-2 start, Tulane rebounded to begin a seven game winning streak with a road win at Louisiana-Lafayette, followed by wins against teams including South Florida, UAB, Rice, North Texas, Charlotte, and a 52-6 Homecoming win against Temple. During this win streak, Tulane jumped back into the AP Top 25 for the third straight season; with this only happening for the Green Wave once before, when they were ranked in four consecutive seasons from 1936-39.
