= Benjamin Wilson (West Virginia politician) =

American politician (1826–1901)

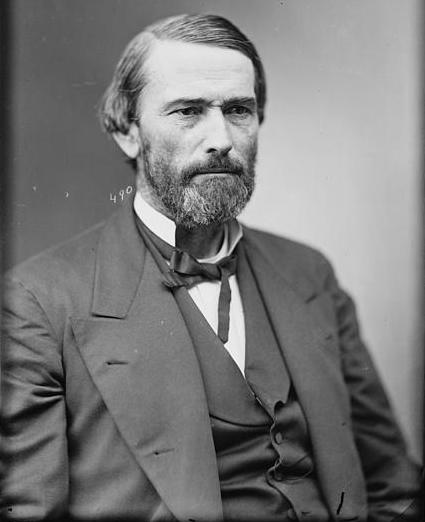

Member of the U.S. House of Representatives from West Virginia's 1st district
- In office March 4, 1875 – March 3, 1883
- Preceded by: John James Davis
- Succeeded by: Nathan Goff

Personal details
- Born: April 30, 1825 Wilsonburg, Virginia, US
- Died: April 26, 1901 (aged 75) Clarksburg, West Virginia, US
- Party: Democratic
- Profession: lawyer, politician

Benjamin Wilson (April 30, 1825 – April 26, 1901) was an American lawyer and Democratic politician who served as a United States representative from West Virginia (1875–1883) and as an assistant attorney general during the administration of President Grover Cleveland (1885 to 1893).

== Early and family life ==
Born in Wilsonburg in Harrison County, Virginia (now West Virginia) to Mary Martin (1804-1831) and her husband, Josiah D. Wilson (1796–1868), Benjamin was named for his paternal grandfather, the patriot Col. Benjamin Wilson Sr. (1747-1827), a lieutenant in Lord Dunmore's Army. After fighting Native Americans, in 1774 Col. Wilson moved across the Allegheny Mountains, settled in the Tygart valley and founded "Wilson's Fort" (which he defended during the American Revolutionary War) and later represented what was then Monongelia County in the Virginia General Assembly and became first clerk of the Harrison County court. This Benjamin Wilson's maternal grandfather, William Martin (1763–1851), had been a patriot as well, serving as commissary for New Jersey troops before settling in Harrison County.

Although Benjamin Wilson did not own slaves, his father Josiah Wilson owned seven or eight slaves in 1850, and ten slaves in 1860. This Benjamin Wilson attended the Northwestern Virginia Academy in Clarksburg, Virginia (now West Virginia). He then traveled to Staunton, Virginia, to attend the law school which Judge Briscoe Baldwin had begun in 1831.

Wilson married Susan Marsh in 1848, and they had a son, Stonewall Jackson Wilson (1862–1887), who survived to adulthood, as did three daughters: Buena Wilson Brown (1849–1930), Mary Drusilla Feeny (1851–1876), and Virginia Lee Wozencraft (1865–1893).

== Career ==
Admitted to the Virginia bar in 1848, Wilson began his legal practice in Clarksburg. He was elected as commonwealth attorney for Harrison County following adoption of a new Virginia state constitution in 1851, and served from 1852 to 1860.

=== Prelude and American Civil War ===
Voters elected Wilson along with Unionist John S. Carlile as their delegates to the Virginia Secession Convention of 1861. Unlike Carlile, who voted against secession during both votes, Wilson abstained from the second vote, though he did sign the ordinance of secession. Later, he and Judge Gideon D. Camden (who owned slaves in both censuses) moved southward into Virginia after Union forces captured much of Harrison County.

=== Postwar politician ===
Wilson was a member of West Virginia's State constitutional convention in 1871. After the adoption of West Virginia's second Constitution in 1872 (which re-enfranchised Confederates, among other changes), Wilson was a delegate to the Democratic National Convention that year. Also in 1872 he lost a bid for election to the 43rd Congress from the 1st Congressional District. In 1874, however, Wilson won the seat. Re-elected three times, he served in the 44th and the next three Congresses (March 4, 1875 – March 3, 1883). During the first Grover Cleveland administration and the administration of Benjamin Harrison, Wilson was Assistant Attorney General of the United States (from 1885 to 1893).

== Death and legacy ==
Benjamin Wilson died on April 26, 1901, in Clarksburg and was buried in the Odd Fellows Cemetery there.

U.S. House of Representatives
Preceded by John James Davis	Member of the U.S. House of Representatives from West Virginia's 1st congressional district 1875-1883	Succeeded by Nathan Goff
