= William S. Wysong =

Attorney General of West Virginia (1845–1903)

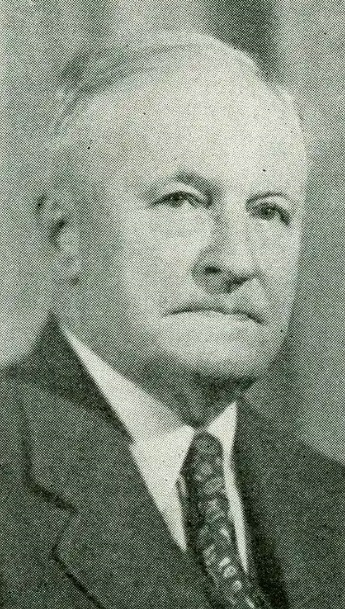
- Official portrait, c. 1951

21st Attorney General of West Virginia
- In office May 25, 1942 – January 13, 1943
- Governor: Matthew M. Neely
- Preceded by: Clarence W. Meadows
- Succeeded by: James Kay Thomas

Member of the West Virginia House of Delegates from Webster County
- In office December 1, 1950 – December 1, 1952
- Preceded by: Carp Robinson
- Succeeded by: E. Hansford McCourt
- In office December 1, 1934 – December 1, 1936
- Preceded by: John R. Dyer
- Succeeded by: Eskridge H. Morton
- In office December 1, 1928 – December 1, 1930
- Preceded by: W. C. Cooper
- Succeeded by: Francis N. Sycafoose
- In office December 1, 1910 – December 1, 1914
- Preceded by: Wateman T. Talbott
- Succeeded by: Wateman T. Talbott

Personal details
- Born: William Sidney Wysong; February 13, 1876 Hamlin, West Virginia, United States
- Died: April 26, 1963 (aged 87) Beard Heights, West Virginia, United States
- Party: Democratic
- Spouse: Mattie Wooddell (m. 1900; died 1947)
- Education: Hampden–Sydney College (AB, BS); West Virginia University (LLB)
- Occupation: Lawyer; politician

William Sidney Wysong (February 13, 1876 – April 26, 1963) was an American lawyer and politician. He served as the 21st Attorney General of West Virginia from May 25, 1942, to January 13, 1943.

== Early life ==
Wysong was the son of William M. Wysong (1845–1903), owner of a dry goods store in Hamlin, and his second wife, Bettie Mayo (Holt) Wysong (1859–1951), daughter of Joseph White Holt, a local judge and legislator.

Wysong attended Hillsboro Academy in Hillsboro, West Virginia, Hampden-Sydney College, and West Virginia University. In 1900 he married Mattie Wooddell (1876-1947); they had one child, William Prentiss Wysong (1903–1964).

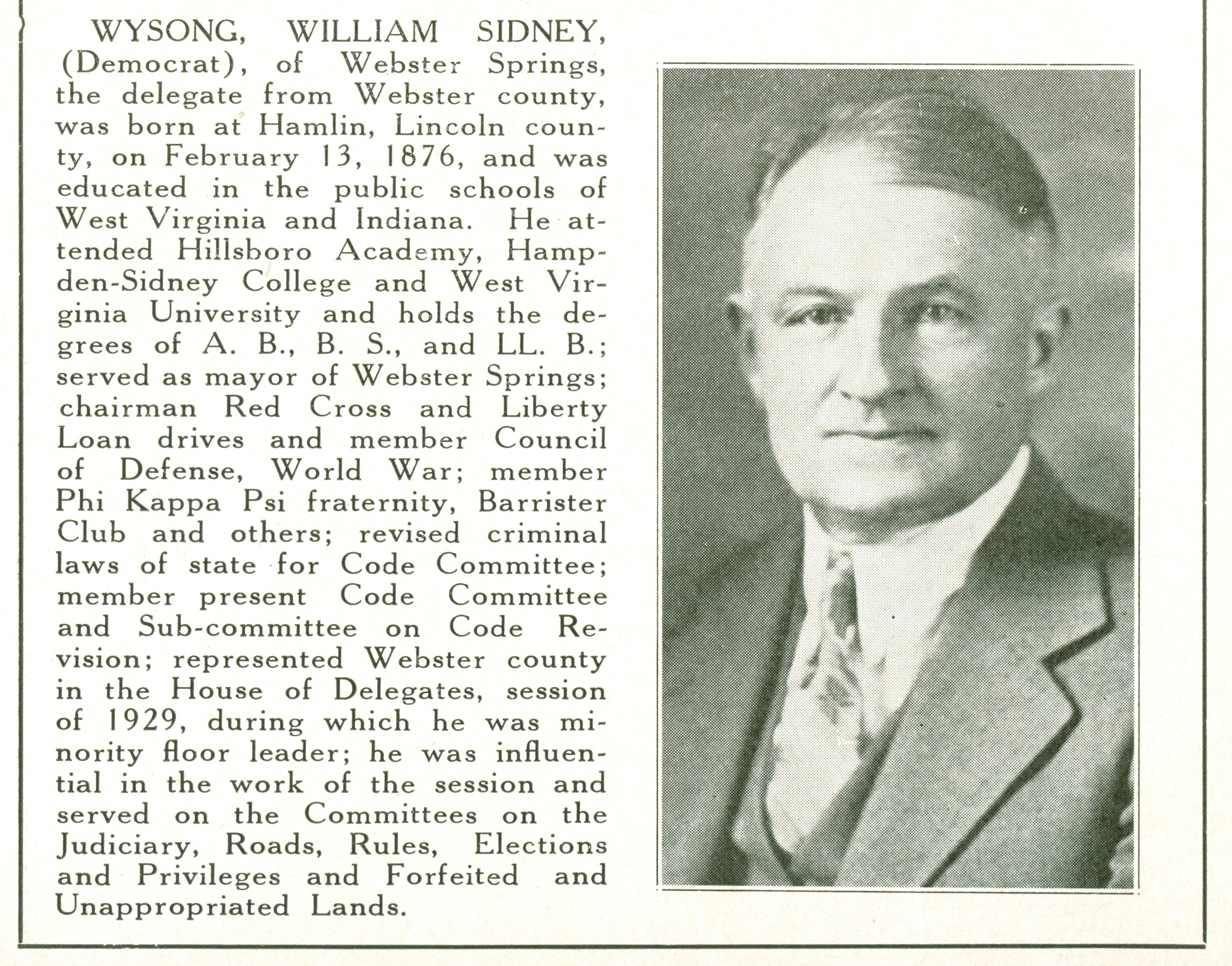
William S. Wysong, from the 1929 West Virginia Blue Book

Wysong served as the mayor of Webster Springs 1907 to 1909. During World War I he headed Liberty Loan drives, was the chairman of the Red Cross, and served on the state Council of National Defense. A Democrat, Wysong served five terms representing Webster County in the state House of Delegates, being elected in 1910, 1912, 1928, 1934, and 1950. He served on the West Virginia Code Commission (1928-9) tasked with revising state law, and the Legislative Code Commission (1930-1931). In 1940 he was a presidential elector. In the early years of World War II Wysong served briefly in a number of state offices - Registrar of Motor Vehicles March–May 1941; president, West Virginia Board of Control, May 1941–May 1942; and attorney general May 1942–January 1943.

As the incumbent, Wysong ran for the 1942 Democratic nomination for attorney general, but despite the endorsement of the United Mine Workers lost to James Kay Thomas. After Thomas won the general election Wysong sued to prevent him from taking office, arguing that his temporary commission in the army made him ineligible; the West Virginia Supreme Court of Appeals rejected that argument and gave the office to Thomas on February 23, 1943.
