= 1940 West Virginia gubernatorial election =

- November 5, 1940
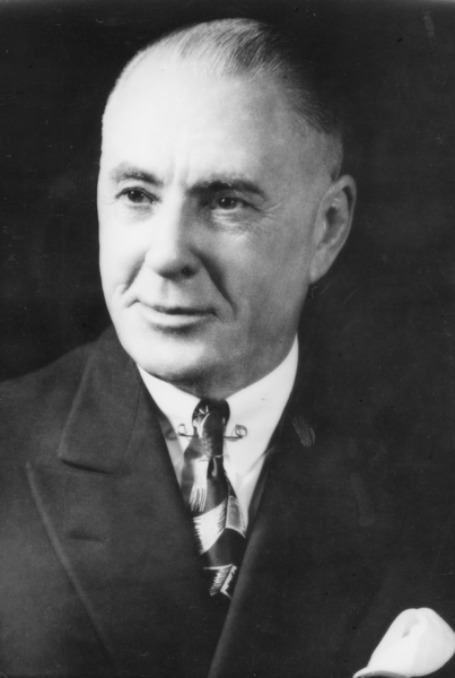

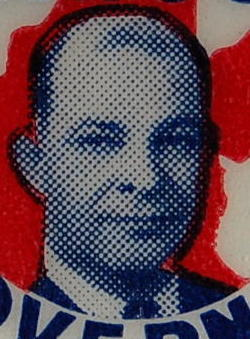
Nominee	Matthew M. Neely	Daniel Boone Dawson
Party	Democratic	Republican
Popular vote	496,028	383,698
Percentage	56.38%	43.62%
- County results Neely: 50–60% 60–70% 70–80% Dawson: 50–60% 60–70% 70–80%
Governor before election
Homer A. Holt
Democratic
Elected Governor
Matthew M. Neely
Democratic

The 1940 West Virginia gubernatorial election took place on November 5, 1940, to elect the governor of West Virginia.

== Results ==
West Virginia gubernatorial election, 1940
Party	Candidate	Votes	%
Democratic	Matthew M. Neely	496,028	56.38
Republican	Daniel Boone Dawson	383,698	43.62
Total votes		879,726	100
Democratic hold			
