= Joseph Rosier =

American politician

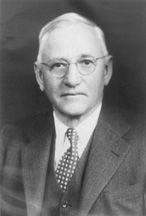

United States Senator from West Virginia
- In office January 13, 1941 – November 17, 1942
- Appointed by: Matthew M. Neely
- Preceded by: Matthew M. Neely
- Succeeded by: Hugh Ike Shott

Member of the West Virginia House of Delegates from Marion County
- In office 1947–1949

Personal details
- Born: January 24, 1870 Wilsonburg, West Virginia
- Died: October 7, 1951 (aged 81) Fairmont, West Virginia
- Party: Democratic
- Education: Salem College
- Profession: Educator

Joseph Rosier (January 24, 1870 – October 7, 1951) was a United States senator from West Virginia. Born in Wilsonburg, West Virginia, he attended the public schools and graduated from Salem College in 1895. In 1890, Rosier was a teacher of the village school at Bristol, West Virginia and was principal of the public schools of Salem in 1891 and 1892; in 1893 and 1894 he was superintendent of schools of Harrison County, West Virginia and was a member of the faculty of Salem College from 1894 to 1896. He was a teacher in the State normal school at Glenville, West Virginia from 1896 to 1897 and was a member of the faculty of the State Teachers' College at Fairmont, West Virginia from 1897 to 1900. He was superintendent of schools of Fairmont from 1900 to 1915 and was president of Fairmont State College, Fairmont from 1915 to 1945 and then president emeritus.

During the First World War, Rosier served as county food administrator (1917–1918) and was a consultant on education for the Works Progress Administration (1933–1937).

On January 13, 1941 he was appointed as a Democrat to the U.S. Senate to fill the vacancy caused by the resignation of Matthew M. Neely and took the oath of office on May 13, 1941, after the Senate resolved a challenge to the appointment. Rosier served from January 13, 1941, to November 17, 1942, when a duly elected successor qualified. Rosier was an unsuccessful candidate for election to the unexpired term, and resumed his former pursuits. He was elected to the West Virginia House of Delegates in 1946.

Joseph Rosier died in Fairmont in 1951. Interment was in I.O.O.F. Cemetery, Salem.

Party political offices
| Preceded by Matthew M. Neely | Democratic nominee for U.S. Senator from West Virginia (Class 2); 1942 | Succeeded by Matthew M. Neely |
U.S. Senate
| Preceded by Matthew M. Neely | Class 2 Senator from West Virginia; 1941–1942; Served alongside: Harley M. Kilgore | Succeeded by Hugh I. Shott |
