= James Kay Thomas =

American lawyer and politician (1902–1989)

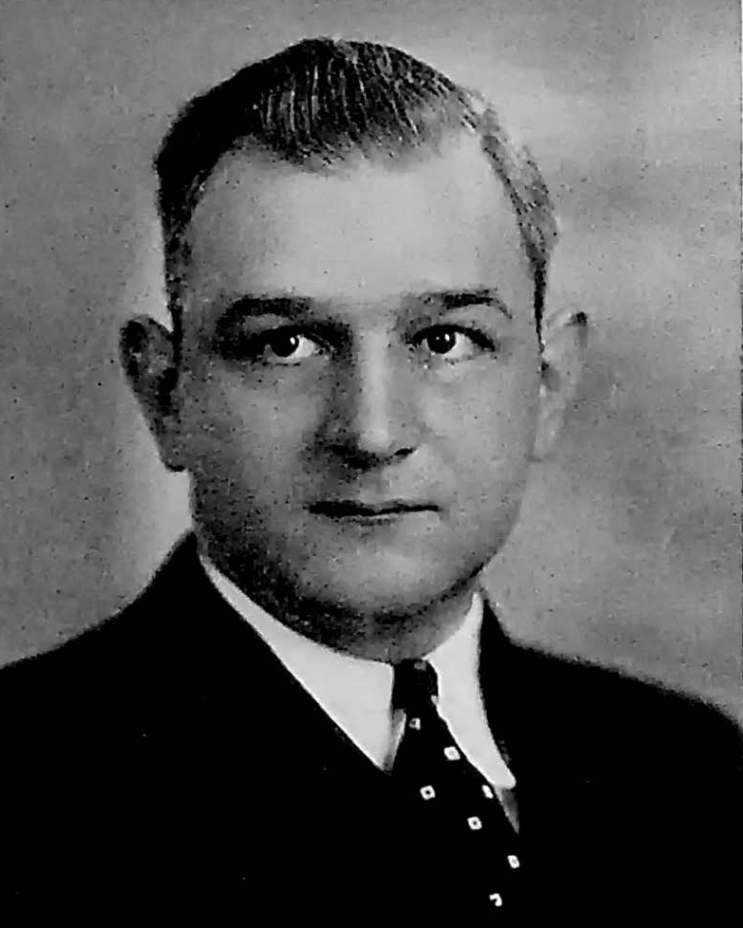

22nd Attorney General of West Virginia
- In office January 13, 1943 – January 15, 1945
- Governor: Matthew M. Neely
- Preceded by: William S. Wysong
- Succeeded by: Ira J. Partlow

38th Speaker of the West Virginia House of Delegates
- In office 1937–1941
- Preceded by: John J. Pelter
- Succeeded by: Malcolm R. Arnold

Member of the West Virginia House of Delegates from Kanawha County
- In office December 1, 1932 – December 1, 1942

Personal details
- Born: James Kay Thomas; February 23, 1902 Charleston, West Virginia
- Died: May 23, 1989 (aged 87)
- Party: Democratic
- Spouse: Julia Lewis Roseberry (m. 1934)
- Education: Washington and Lee University (LLB)

James Kay Thomas (February 23, 1902 – May 23, 1989) was a lawyer from Charleston and former West Virginia Attorney General.

== Early years ==
=== Washington & Lee University ===
Thomas was a prominent end for the Washington & Lee Generals football team of Washington & Lee University. He stood 5 feet 10 inches and weighed 160 pounds. He was selected All-Southern in 1925.

== Attorney General ==
Thomas was West Virginia Attorney General from 1942 to 1945. Before this he served five consecutive terms in the House of Delegates.

== See also ==
- 1925 College Football All-Southern Team

Party political offices
Preceded by Clarence W. Meadows	Democratic nominee for West Virginia Attorney General; 1942	Succeeded by Ira J. Partlow
Legal offices
Preceded by William S. Wysong	Attorney General of West Virginia; 1943–1945	Succeeded by Ira J. Partlow
