= 1944 West Virginia gubernatorial election =

- November 7, 1944
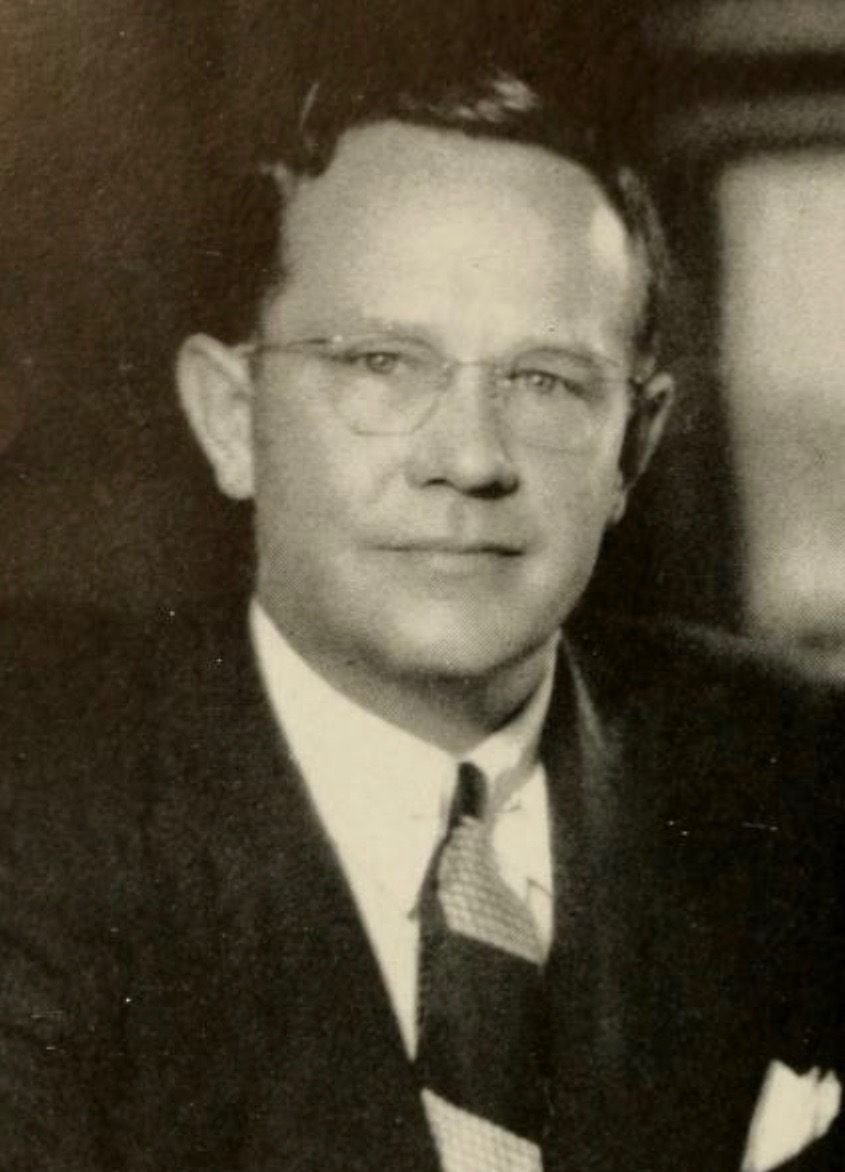

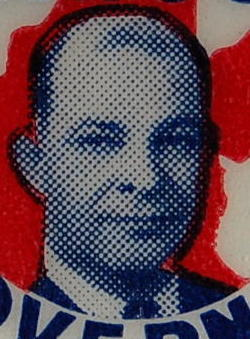
Nominee	Clarence W. Meadows	Daniel Boone Dawson
Party	Democratic	Republican
Popular vote	395,122	330,649
Percentage	54.44%	45.56%
- County results Meadows: 50–60% 60–70% Dawson: 50–60% 60–70% 70–80% 80–90%
Governor before election
Matthew M. Neely
Democratic
Elected Governor
Clarence W. Meadows
Democratic

The 1944 West Virginia gubernatorial election took place on November 7, 1944, to elect the governor of West Virginia. Rush Holt Sr. unsuccessfully ran for the Democratic nomination.

== Results ==
=== Democratic primary ===
West Virginia gubernatorial Democratic primary election, 1944
Party	Candidate	Votes	%
Democratic	Clarence W. Meadows	128,440	66.25%
Democratic	Rush Holt Sr.	46,313	23.89%
Democratic	J. Blackburn Watts	15,569	8.03%
Democratic	Grover Goldfield McPeek	3,550	1.83%
Total votes		193,872	100.00%

=== Republican primary ===
West Virginia gubernatorial Republican primary election, 1944
Party	Candidate	Votes	%
Republican	Daniel Boone Dawson	100,379	57.17%
Republican	Raymond J. Funkhouser	68,980	39.29%
Republican	William McKinley Garrison	6,208	3.54%
Total votes		175,567	100.00%

=== General election ===
West Virginia gubernatorial election, 1944
Party	Candidate	Votes	%
Democratic	Clarence W. Meadows	395,122	54.44%
Republican	Daniel Boone Dawson	330,649	45.56%
Total votes		725,771	100.00%
Democratic hold			
