= 1925 College Football All-Southern Team =

American all-star college football team

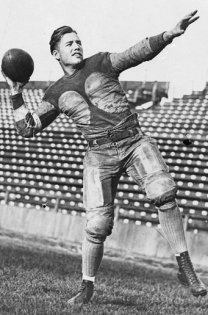
Doug Wycoff of Georgia Tech.

The 1925 College Football All-Southern Team consists of American football players selected to the College Football All-Southern Teams selected by various organizations for the 1925 Southern Conference football season.

In the annual Rose Bowl game, the SoCon champion Alabama Crimson Tide defeated the heavily favored PCC champion Washington Huskies 20–19 and became the first southern team ever to win a Rose Bowl. It is commonly referred to as "the game that changed the south." Alabama therefore was named a national champion.

== Composite eleven ==
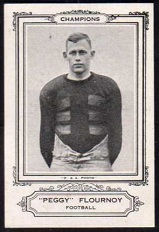
Peggy Flournoy of Tulane was a near unanimous selection.

The composite All-Southern eleven compiled by the Associated Press (AP) included:

- Johnny Mack Brown, halfback for Alabama, third-team AP All-America, inducted into the College Football Hall of Fame in 1957. In the Rose Bowl, he earned Most Valuable Player honors after scoring two of his team's three touchdowns. Following the game, Brown was depicted on Wheaties cereal boxes. He was later an actor, starring in several films.
- Bill Buckler, guard for Alabama, second-team AP All-America. He played in the National Football League (NFL) with the Chicago Bears for six years.
- Peggy Flournoy, halfback for Tulane, second-team AP All-America, received the most selections. Flournoy led Tulane to an undefeated season; and he led the nation in scoring with 128 points.
- Goldy Goldstein, tackle for Florida. Goldstein was one of the first Jews to ever play for the Gators. He played professionally for the Newark Bears of the first American Football League (AFL), and was later an attorney practicing in Miami Beach.
- Pooley Hubert, quarterback for Alabama, inducted into the College Football Hall of Fame in 1964. While he was his team's best passer, he was also heralded as one of the game's best ever defensive backs. Coach Wallace Wade called him "undoubtedly one of the greatest football players of all time."
- Amos Kent, center for Sewanee. Kent was later a lumber salesman.
- Irish Levy, guard for Tulane. Levy was selected for the New York Sun's All-Time Tulane team. Like Goldstein, he was Jewish.
- J. G. Lowe, end for Tennessee, third-team AP All-America. Lowe was the last to be elected captain of the football team in consecutive years until 2004.
- Bob Rives, tackle for Vanderbilt. Rives was considered the greatest football player ever to come out of Hopkinsville High School in Hopkinsville, Kentucky. He played professionally for the Newark Bears and later was for several years a referee for high school football games throughout Tennessee.
- Smack Thompson, end and captain for Georgia. Georgia defeated Auburn 34 to 0 in this year's version of the Deep South's Oldest Rivalry.
- Doug Wycoff, fullback for Georgia Tech. Coach Alexander recalled "The work of Douglas Wycoff against Notre Dame two years in succession was brilliant in the extreme, as was his plunging against Penn State when we defeated them twice." Wycoff played professionally for various teams in both the AFL and NFL including with the Newark Bears. He was inducted into the Georgia Sports Hall of Fame in 1978.

== Composite overview ==
Peggy Flournoy received the most votes, 31 of the possible 32.

Name	Position	School	First-team selections
Peggy Flournoy	Halfback	Tulane	31
Johnny Mack Brown	Halfback	Alabama	24
Pooley Hubert	Quarterback	Alabama	21
Doug Wycoff	Fullback	Georgia Tech	21
Bill Buckler	Guard	Alabama	20
Irish Levy	Guard	Tulane	17
Bob Rives	Tackle	Vanderbilt	15
Edgar C. Jones	Halfback/Quarterback	Florida	15
J. G. Lowe	End	Tennessee	13
Goldy Goldstein	Tackle	Florida	11
Smack Thompson	End	Georgia	10
James Kay Thomas	End	Washington & Lee	9
Amos Kent	Center	Sewanee	9
Owen Poole	Center	Georgia Tech	6

== All-Southerns of 1925 ==
=== Ends ===
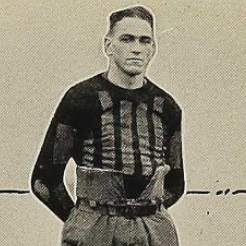
Bob Rives of Vanderbilt.

- J. G. Lowe, Tennessee (C, S, NEB-1, DM-1, TQ, BE)
- Smack Thompson, Georgia (C, NEB-1, BE)
- James Kay Thomas, Washington & Lee (C, DM-1, BE)
- Bill Supplee, Maryland (S)
- G. B. Ollinger, Auburn (NEB-2)
- Joe Tilghman, Furman (NEB-2)
- H. L. Stone, Mississippi A&M (DM-2)
- Coach, Mississippi A&M (DM-2)
- Gus Merkle, Georgia Tech (BE)
- Delmas Gooch, Sewanee (BE)
- Doc Wilson, Tulane (BE)

=== Tackles ===
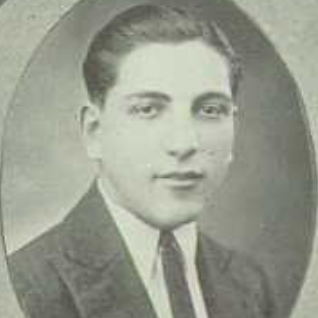
Goldy Goldstein of Florida.

- Bob Rives, Vanderbilt (C, NEB-2, DM-1, TQ [as end], BE)
- Goldy Goldstein, Florida (C, DM-2, BE)
- Mul Holland, Virginia (S, NEB-1, DM-1, BE)
- Curtis Luckey, Georgia (NEB-1, DM-2, TQ, BE)
- Ox McKibbon, Vanderbilt (S, BE)
- Cy Williams, Florida (TQ)
- Six Carpenter, Georgia Tech (NEB-2)
- Hoss Talbot, Tulane (BE)
- Robinson, North Carolina (BE)

=== Guards ===
- Bill Buckler, Alabama (C, S, DM-1, BE)
- Irish Levy, Tulane (C, NEB-1, DM-2, TQ, BE)
- Walt Godwin, Georgia Tech (S, NEB-2, DM-2, TQ, BE)
- Roy Lloyd Dismukes, Alabama (NEB-1)
- Roy Blackledge, Tulane (NEB-2)
- Bruce Jones, Alabama (BE)
- Clyde Norton, Florida (BE)
- John Barnhill, Tennessee (BE)

=== Centers ===
- Amos Kent, Sewanee (C, DM-1 [as G], BE)
- Owen Pool, Georgia Tech (C, NEB-1, TQ, BE)
- Walter Forbes, Georgia (S)
- Herman McIver, North Carolina (DM-1, BE)
- Harvey Wilson, Tulane (NEB-2)
- Joseph Moran, VPI (BE)

=== Quarterbacks ===
- Pooley Hubert, Alabama (College Football Hall of Fame) (C, S, NEB-1, DM-1, BE)
- Lester Lautenschlaeger, Tulane (College Football Hall of Fame) (NEB-2, DM-2, BE)
- A. C. Carter Diffey, Virginia (BE)
- Arthur Matsu, William & Mary (BE)

=== Halfbacks ===
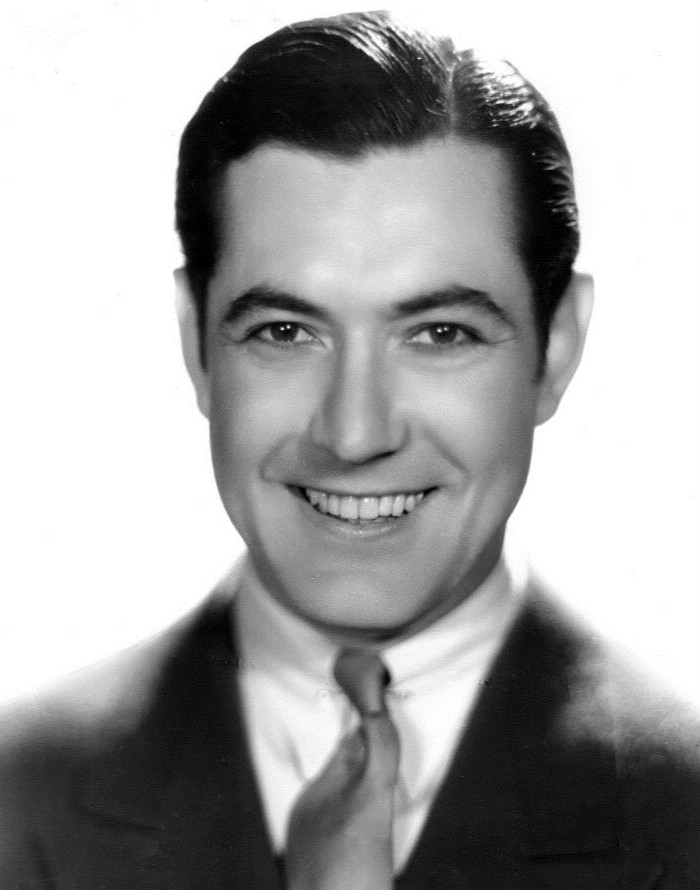
Johnny Mack Brown in 1935, during his career as a film actor.

- Peggy Flournoy, Tulane (C, S, NEB-1, DM-2 [as fb], TQ, BE)
- Johnny Mack Brown, Alabama (College Football Hall of Fame) (C, S, DM-1, TQ, BE)
- Edgar C. Jones, Florida (C, NEB-1, DM-2, BE [as qb])
- Gil Reese, Vanderbilt (DM-1, TQ [as qb], BE)
- Adrian Maurer, Oglethorpe (NEB-2, BE)
- Henry McGill Wilson, Washington & Lee (NEB-2)
- Red Barnes, Alabama (DM-2, BE)
- Palmer, Washington & Lee (BE)

=== Fullbacks ===
- Doug Wycoff, Georgia Tech (C, S, NEB-1, DM-1, TQ, BE)
- Bill Devin Jr., North Carolina (NEB-2)
- Windy White, VMI (BE)
- George Mahoney, Sewanee (BE)

== Key ==
Bold = Composite selection

C = received votes for a composite All-Southern eleven compiled by the Associated Press.

S = selected by Herman Stegeman, athletic director at the University of Georgia.

NEB = selected by Norman E. Brown. It had a first and second team.

DM = selected by Dan McGugin, head coach at Vanderbilt University. It had a first and second team.

TQ = selected by The Technique, Georgia Institute of Technology's student newspaper.

BE = Billy Evans' "Southern Honor Roll"

== See also ==
- 1925 College Football All-America Team
