= Isabel Wood Holt =

- Born: January 23, 1899; Charlottesville, Virginia
- Died: September 5, 1996 (aged 97); Charleston, West Virginia
- Known for: First lady of West Virginia, 1937-1941

Isabel Wood Holt (1899–1996) was the wife of former Governor of West Virginia Homer A. Holt and served as that state's First Lady, 1937-1941. She was born January 23, 1899, at Charlottesville, Virginia. In 1924, she married Homer A. Holt. As first lady, she dedicated most of her time to raising their three young children ((Julia Kinsley Holt (Coyle), Isabel Drury Holt (Dannenberg) and Robert Byrne Holt)). After leaving office, the Holts remained in Charleston, West Virginia, where the former governor practiced law. Following his death in 1975, Isabel remained in Charleston in her home on Bridge Road. She kept a garden on the place and grew the World's best tomatoes and canteloupes according to her grandson, Claiborne Holt Coyle. Isabel Wood Holt died on September 5, 1996, and was buried in Lewisburg, West Virginia.

Honorary titles
| Preceded by Edna Hall Scott Kump | First Lady of West Virginia; 1937 – 1941 | Succeeded by Alberta Ramage Neely |
