= Mul Holland =

American baseball player (1903–1969)

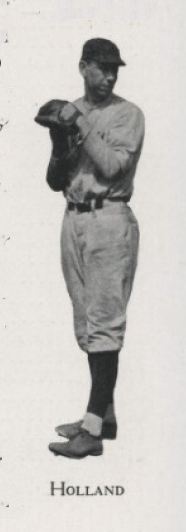
- Pitcher
- Born: January 6, 1903; Franklin, Virginia, U.S.
- Died: February 16, 1969 (aged 66); Winchester, Virginia, U.S.
- Batted: Right Threw: Right

MLB debut
- May 25, 1926, for the Cincinnati Reds

Last MLB appearance
- July 13, 1929, for the St. Louis Cardinals

MLB statistics
- Win–loss record: 1–1
- Strikeouts: 5
- Earned run average: 6.26
- Stats at Baseball Reference

Teams
- Cincinnati Reds (1926); New York Giants (1927); St. Louis Cardinals (1929)

Howard Holland
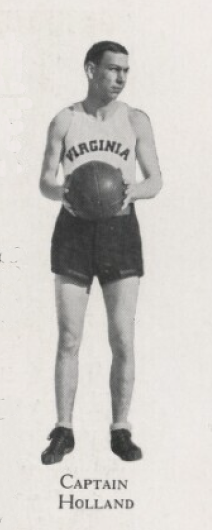

Virginia Cavaliers
- Position: Tackle

Career information
- College: Virginia (1923–1925)

Awards and highlights
- All-Southern (1925)

Howard Arthur "Mul" Holland (January 6, 1903 – February 16, 1969) was an American Major League Baseball pitcher. He played parts of three seasons in the majors, each with a different team. He played for the Cincinnati Reds in 1926, the New York Giants in 1927, and the St. Louis Cardinals in 1929.

== Playing ==
Holland played tackle for the Virginia Cavaliers football team. Greasy Neale rated him with the best he ever coached. He was selected All-Southern in 1925.

He also played basketball. After the SoCon tournament, Holland was selected for the 1925 All-Tournament team among tournament champion Jack Cobb.

Holland pitched for the Virginia Cavaliers baseball team and was signed by the Cincinnati Reds in July 1926. He made three appearances in relief, giving up only one run in 6.2 innings. He was released by the Reds and signed by the Giants prior to the 1927 season. He appeared in two games for New York, pitching two scoreless innings and earning one win. He was released on May 14, 1927. He finished the year with the Clarksburg Generals of the Middle Atlantic League, compiling a 9–10 record and a 3.61 earned run average over 147 innings.

In 1929, Holland's football and baseball coach at Virginia, joined the Cardinals coaching staff and recommended signing Holland. He made eight relief appearances for the club, giving up 15 runs in 14.1 innings. He was outrighted to the Houston Buffaloes on August 9, 1929. He pitched in 8 games for Houston, going 0–2 with a 5.70 ERA.

== Coaching ==
In 1926 and 1927, Holland coached the Virginia freshman football team. In 1928, he was named varsity line coach. In 1929, Earl Abell succeeded Neale as Virginia's head football and baseball coach. However, he chose to give his baseball duties to Holland in order to focus on football.

== Statistics ==
- Career statistics from Baseball Reference · Baseball Reference (Minors) · Retrosheet · Baseball Almanac
