= Nancy Massie Meadows =

- Born: 1912; Clifton Forge, Virginia
- Died: March 27, 1986 (aged 73–74); Mt. Hope, West Virginia
- Known for: First lady of West Virginia, 1945-1949

Nancy Massie Meadows (1912–March 27, 1986) was the wife of former Governor of West Virginia Clarence W. Meadows and served as that state's First Lady, 1945-1949. She was born in 1912 at Clifton Forge, Virginia. She graduated from Stuart Hall School, then married Clarence W. Meadows in 1934. As first lady, she spent much of her time raising their four young daughters. After leaving office, she served as social director at The Greenbrier Resort. She and her husband lived in Charleston, West Virginia and later moved to Ft. Lauderdale, Florida. After Gov. Meadows death in 1961, she moved to Lewisburg, West Virginia, where she died on March 27, 1986.

Honorary titles
Preceded by Alberta Ramage Neely	First Lady of West Virginia; 1945 – 1949	Succeeded by Lee Hawse Patteson
