= 1936 West Virginia gubernatorial election =

- November 3, 1936
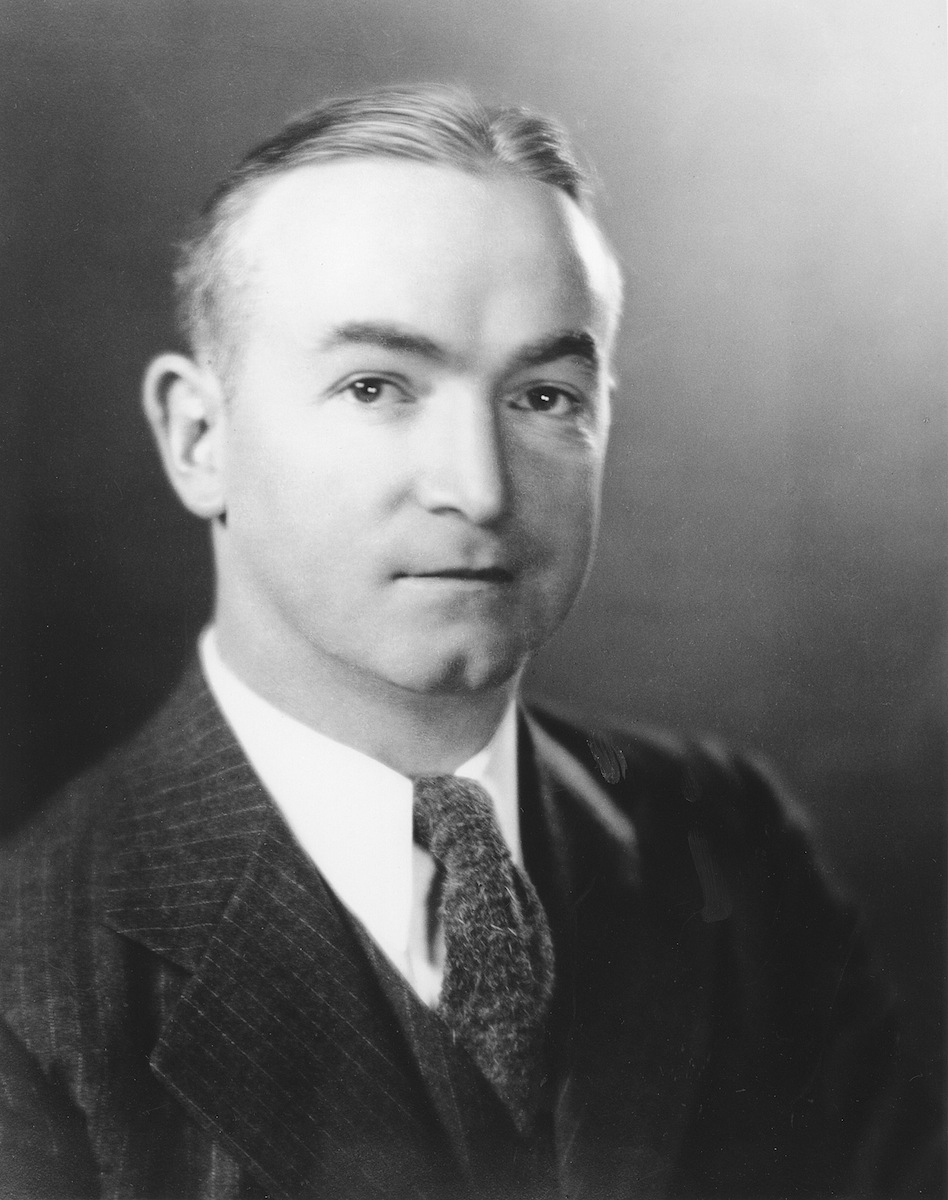

Nominee	Homer Holt	Summers Sharp
Party	Democratic	Republican
Popular vote	492,333	339,890
Percentage	59.16%	40.84%
- County results Holt: 50–60% 60–70% 70–80% Sharp: 50–60% 60–70% 70–80%
Governor before election
Herman G. Kump
Democratic
Elected Governor
Homer A. Holt
Democratic

The 1936 West Virginia gubernatorial election took place on November 3, 1936, to elect the governor of West Virginia. Chapman Revercomb unsuccessfully ran for the Republican nomination.

== Results ==
West Virginia gubernatorial election, 1936
Party	Candidate	Votes	%
Democratic	Homer A. Holt	492,333	59.16
Republican	Summers H. Sharp	339,890	40.84
Total votes		832,223	100
Democratic hold			
