= Smack Thompson =

American football player (1900–1981)

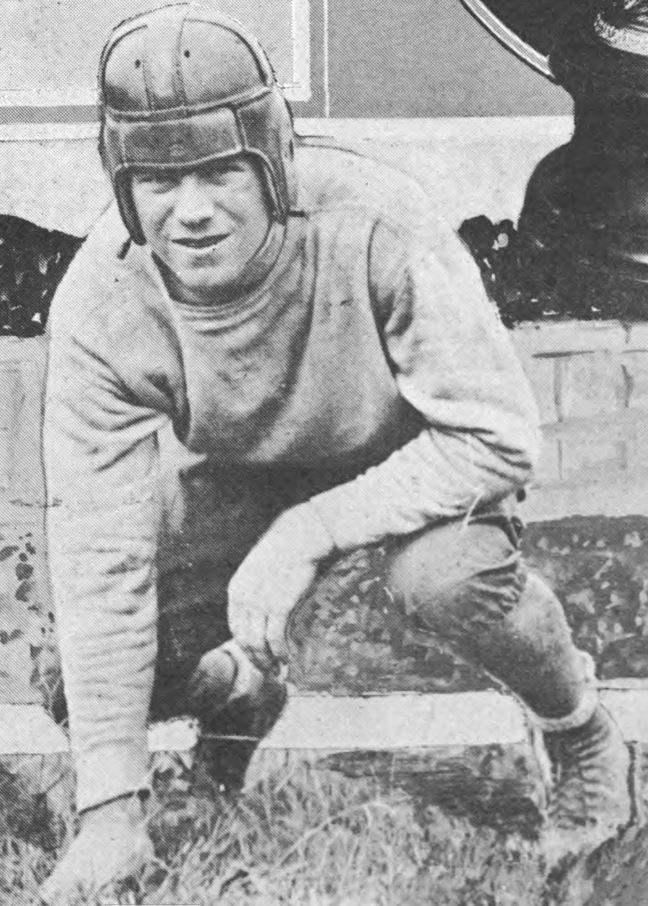
- Thompson in 1925

Profile
- Position: End

Personal information
- Born: May 30, 1900; Atlanta, Georgia, U.S.
- Died: October 31, 1981 (aged 81)

Career information
- College: Georgia (1921–1922; 1924–1925)

Awards and highlights
- All-Southern (1924, 1925)

Ralph Sandford "Smack" Thompson (May 30, 1900 – October 31, 1981) was a college football player. He was the brother of Charlie Thompson.

== College football ==
Thompson was an All-Southern end for Kid Woodruff's Georgia Bulldogs of the University of Georgia, captain of its 1925 team. That team defeated Auburn 34 to 0 in Columbus. Allegedly, Thompson would yell out in his sleep. On the eve of a 3–0 loss to Georgia Tech, he screamed out "Kill the SOB", referring to Doug Wycoff. Once during the game both were knocked unconscious. "He was absolutely poison" wrote Morgan Blake about Thompson, "with reckless disregard for life and limb, he plunged into the thick of every play."
