= Bill Buckler =

American football player (1901–1979)

Profile
- Position: Guard

Personal information
- Born: April 29, 1901; St. Paul, Minnesota, U.S.
- Died: June 20, 1979 (aged 78); Wood River, Illinois, U.S.
- Listed height: 6 ft 0 in (1.83 m)
- Listed weight: 224 lb (102 kg)

Career information
- College: Alabama

Career history
- Chicago Bears (1926–1933)

Awards and highlights
- 2× NFL champion (1932, 1933); National champion (1925); Second-team All-American (1925); All-Southern (1925)
- Stats at Pro Football Reference

William Earl Buckler (April 29, 1901 – June 20, 1979) was an American professional football player who played guard for six seasons for the Chicago Bears.

== Biography ==
Buckler was born in St. Paul, Minnesota. He attended the University of Alabama, where he earned a bachelor's degree and a master's degree in mechanical engineering. While he was at Alabama, he was on the first Alabama football team to play in the Rose Bowl Game, in 1926.

Buckler played for the Chicago Bears from 1926 to 1933, during which time the Bears were twice champions of the National Football League (in 1932 and 1933). After his professional football career ended, he was and engineer for the John Deere Company, and head of several foundry companies in Illinois.

Buckler married Mary Steed. His sons Bill Jr. and Jim also attended the University of Alabama. He died in 1979, at the age of 78, in Wood River, Illinois.
