= Clarence W. Meadows =

American politician (1904–1961)

Clarence Watson Meadows
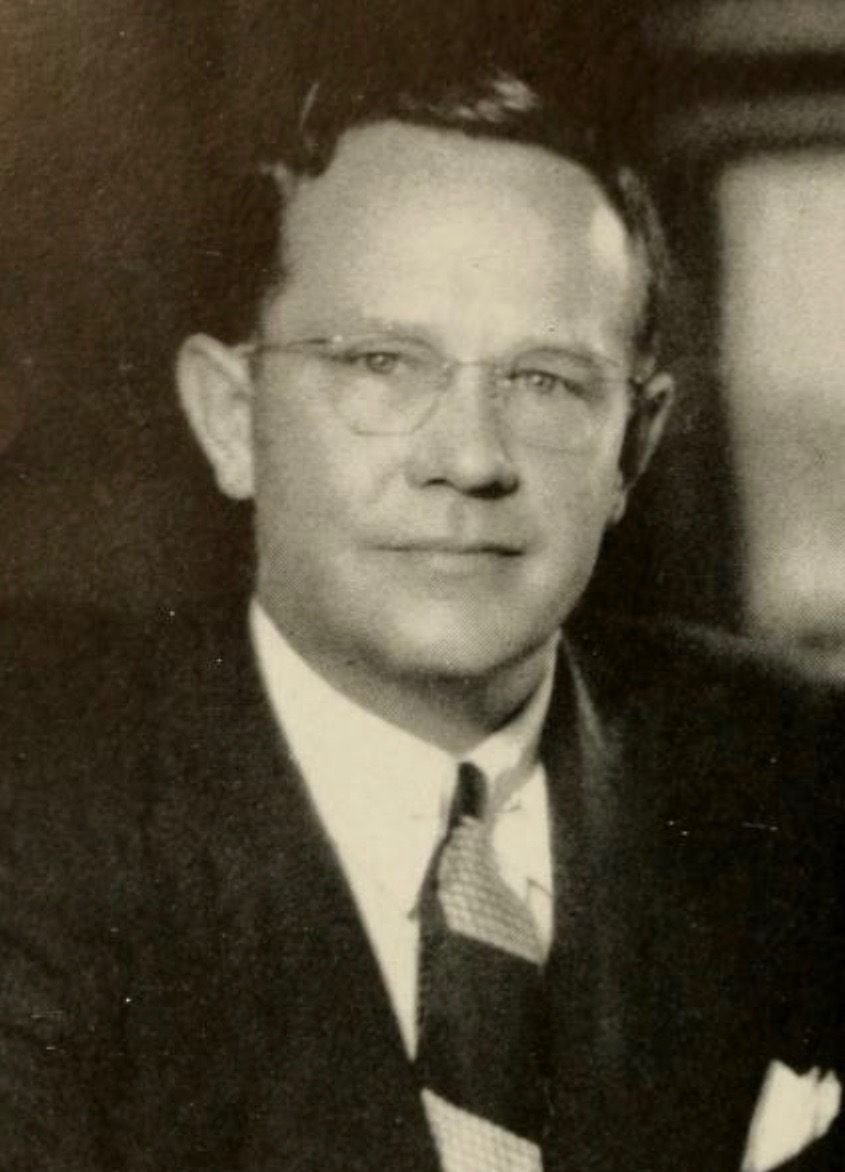
- Meadows from The Monticola, 1948

22nd Governor of West Virginia
- In office January 15, 1945 – January 17, 1949
- Preceded by: Matthew M. Neely
- Succeeded by: Okey Patteson

Attorney General of West Virginia
- In office January 18, 1937 – May 25, 1942
- Governor: Homer A. Holt; Matthew M. Neely
- Preceded by: Homer A. Holt
- Succeeded by: William S. Wysong

Personal details
- Born: February 11, 1904 Beckley, West Virginia, U.S.
- Died: September 12, 1961 (aged 57) Clifton Forge, Virginia, U.S.
- Party: Democratic
- Spouse: Nancy Massie Meadows

Clarence Watson Meadows (February 11, 1904 – September 12, 1961) was the 22nd governor of West Virginia from 1945 to 1949. He was the first governor of West Virginia to be born in the 20th century.

Meadows was born and raised in Beckley. As a youth, he showed a passion for public speaking, and his parents attempted to direct him toward a career as a Baptist minister. However, Meadows was instead drawn toward the stage and, after receiving a degree from Washington and Lee University, he became active in his hometown's theater troupe. Meadows received a law degree from the University of Alabama in 1927 and subsequently entered into an active career in politics. In 1930, Meadows won in his first run for elective office, as he entered the West Virginia House of Delegates for a single term. He chose not to run for reelection, but instead successfully earned a position as Raleigh County District Attorney. In 1936, Meadows entered state politics, with the first of his two terms as West Virginia Attorney General. Because of his candor and honest disposition, Meadows became one of the most respected politicians in the state. In 1942, he accepted an appointment as a judge for the state's Tenth Judicial Circuit.

Using a then-modern campaign that featured an array of radio appearances, Meadows was easily elected governor in 1944. As governor, his priorities included ameliorating labor strife in the coal industry, increasing access to quality education, and improving transportation to the geographically isolated state.

At the conclusion of his term, Meadows returned to his law practice. In 1957, he retired to Florida and assisted Democrats in his new state with campaigning. He died in 1961 while visiting relatives in Clifton Forge, Virginia.

Party political offices
Preceded by Homer A. Holt	Democratic nominee for West Virginia Attorney General; 1936, 1940	Succeeded by James Kay Thomas
Preceded by Matthew M. Neely	Democratic nominee for Governor of West Virginia; 1944	Succeeded by Okey Patteson
Legal offices
Preceded by Homer A. Holt	Attorney General of West Virginia; 1937–1942	Succeeded by William S. Wysong
Political offices
Preceded by Matthew M. Neely	Governor of West Virginia; 1945–1949	Succeeded by Okey L. Patteson
