= Homer A. Holt =

American politician (1898–1975)

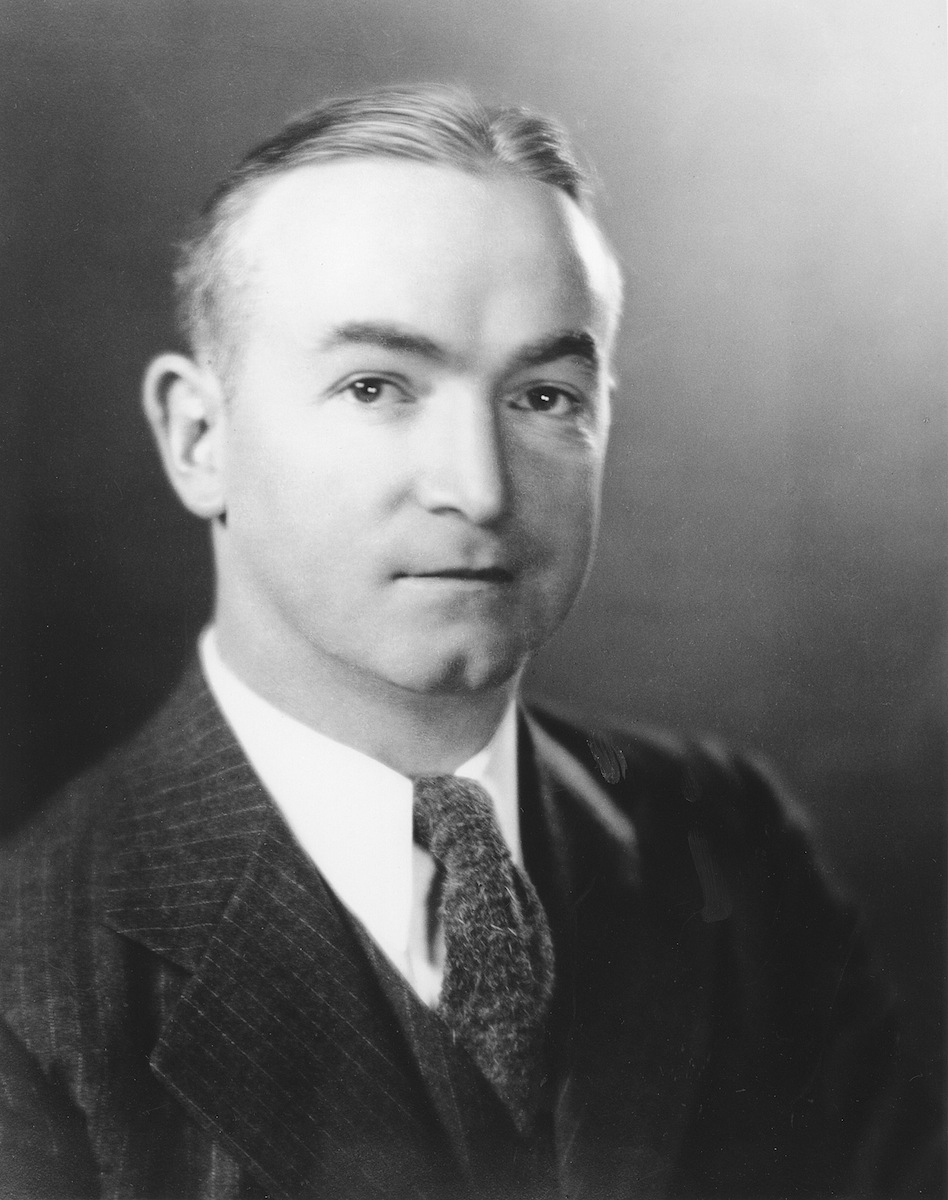

20th Governor of West Virginia
- In office January 18, 1937 – January 13, 1941
- Preceded by: Herman G. Kump
- Succeeded by: Matthew M. Neely

19th Attorney General of West Virginia
- In office March 4, 1933 – January 18, 1937
- Governor: Herman G. Kump
- Preceded by: Howard B. Lee
- Succeeded by: Clarence W. Meadows

Personal details
- Born: March 1, 1898 Lewisburg, West Virginia, U.S.
- Died: January 16, 1975 (aged 76) Charleston, West Virginia, U.S.
- Party: Democratic
- Spouse: Isabel Wood Holt
- Profession: Politician

Military service
- Allegiance: United States
- Branch/service: United States Army
- Battles/wars: World War I

Homer Adams Holt (March 1, 1898 – January 16, 1975) was an American lawyer and conservative politician who served as the 20th governor of West Virginia from 1937 to 1941. Born in Lewisburg, West Virginia, he attended the Greenbrier Military School there and then went on to graduate from Washington and Lee University in 1918, where he was a member of the Phi Kappa Psi fraternity. After serving in the army during World War I, he returned to Washington and Lee in 1920 and studied law, receiving his degree in 1923. In 1924, he married Isabel Wood.

Holt taught law at Washington and Lee University School of Law for two years, and then practiced law in Fayetteville, West Virginia from 1925 to 1933. He was elected state attorney general in 1932, and served until becoming governor in 1937. Holt had been attorney general of West Virginia during the time of the Hawks Nest Tunnel tragedy and "During his term as attorney general, Holt successfully defended Union Carbide in the Supreme Court Trial, United States V. State of West Virginia, 295 U.S. 463 (1935)". Holt was governor during the time the Writers' Project of the Works Project Administration (WPA) began work on West Virginia: A Guide to the Mountain State in 1939. Holt did not want the guide to be published, he believed that it would discredit the state and was "propaganda from start to finish". After his term as governor he resumed his career as a lawyer by becoming general counsel for the Union Carbide Company in New York (same company behind the Hawks Nest Tunnel disaster).

Holt was a trustee of Washington and Lee University from 1940 to 1969, when he became a trustee emeritus.

Holt's grandfather Homer A. Holt (1831–1898) was a lawyer and justice of the West Virginia Supreme Court of Appeals; he died shortly before Holt's birth and Holt was presumably named in his honor.

Party political offices
Preceded by Robert L. Ramsay	Democratic nominee for West Virginia Attorney General; 1932	Succeeded by Clarence W. Meadows
Preceded by Herman G. Kump	Democratic nominee for Governor of West Virginia; 1936	Succeeded by Matthew M. Neely
Legal offices
Preceded by Howard B. Lee	Attorney General of West Virginia; 1933–1937	Succeeded by William S. Wysong
Political offices
Preceded by H. Guy Kump	Governor of West Virginia; 1937–1941	Succeeded by Matthew M. Neely
