= Larry Smith (American football coach) =

American football player (1939–2008)

- Smith during his tenure with USC

Biographical details
- Born: September 12, 1939; Van Wert, Ohio, U.S.
- Died: January 28, 2008 (aged 68); Tucson, Arizona, U.S.

Playing career
- 1959–1961: Bowling Green
- Position: End

Coaching career (HC unless noted)
- 1962–1963: Shawnee HS (OH) (assistant)
- 1964–1966: Shawnee HS (OH)
- 1967–1968: Miami (OH) (DE)
- 1969–1972: Michigan (OL)
- 1973–1975: Arizona (AHC/DC)
- 1976–1979: Tulane
- 1980–1986: Arizona
- 1987–1992: USC
- 1994–2000: Missouri

Head coaching record
- Overall: 143–126–7 (college)
- Bowls: 3–6–1

Accomplishments and honors

Championships
- 3 Pac-10 (1987–1989)

Larry Dean Smith (September 12, 1939 – January 28, 2008) was an American college football player and coach. He served as the head football coach at Tulane University (1976–1979), the University of Arizona (1980–1986), the University of Southern California (1987–1992), and the University of Missouri (1994–2000).

In Smith's 24 seasons as a head coach, his teams were 143–126–7.

== Early life ==
Smith was a native of Van Wert, Ohio, where he was a three-sport star at Van Wert High School, graduating in 1957.

He earned an appointment to West Point, but transferred to Bowling Green State University a year later to pursue coaching. He played two-way end for the Falcons, playing on a small-college national championship team as a sophomore in 1959; he won all-league honors as a junior and was team captain as a senior. Smith graduated from Bowling Green in 1962 with a Bachelor of Science in Mathematics, and later earned a Master of Education from Bowling Green in 1967.

== Assistant coach ==
Known as a defense-oriented, no-nonsense coach, Smith began coaching as an assistant with Shawnee High School in Lima, Ohio for two seasons (1962–63) and then head coach the next three years (1964–66). In 1967, he joined Bo Schembechler's staff at Miami University, serving as defensive end coach for two seasons.

He moved with Schembechler to Michigan, serving as offensive line coach for four seasons (1969–72). When fellow assistant coach Jim Young (also a native of Van Wert, OH and high school football teammate) was hired as head coach at Arizona, Smith moved with him and served as the assistant head coach/defensive coordinator there for three years (1973–75).

== Head coaching career ==
=== Tulane ===
After the departure of Bennie Ellender, Tulane hired Smith as the head coach in 1976. His first team went 2–9, then improved in 1977 to 3–8, and then 4–7 in 1978.

Smith's Green Wave team experienced a break-out year in 1979: Tulane opened the season defeating #13 Stanford and later defeated #19 SMU. In the regular season finale, Tulane defeated rival LSU, 24–13, in the Louisiana Superdome; the crowd of 73,496 remains the highest attendance to see the Green Wave play at the Superdome. Tulane ended the regular season with a 9–2 record, ranked #15 and was invited to play in the 1979 Liberty Bowl, its first bowl game in six years.

Tulane lost to Penn State, 9–6, but Smith's ability to finish the season 9–3 attracted attention and he was hired away by Arizona.

Smith's tenure with Tulane ended with a 17–27 record. Under his guidance, 10 Tulane players earned All-America honors, including two-time All-American quarterback Roch Hontas and kicker Eddie Murray, as well as offensive tackle Eric Laakso and tight end Rodney Holman. Six of his Tulane players entered the NFL.

=== Arizona ===
Smith arrived at Arizona in time for the 1980 season, the Wildcats' third season in the Pacific-10 Conference (along with rival Arizona State [ASU], they had joined the former Pacific-8 in 1978). Smith put great emphasis on in-state recruiting, built up the rivalry game with ASU, and focused the team on what he called "running and hitting". His first team went 5–6, including a 44–7 blowout loss to ASU; it would be his only losing season at Arizona. The highlight of the season was a 23-17 upset of 2nd-ranked UCLA (the Bruins were poised to become #1 as top ranked Alabama had lost earlier in the day).

The Wildcats improved to 6-5 during his second season, highlighted by a major 13–10 upset of #1 USC on the road.

Under Smith's leadership, the Wildcats became competitive in the conference, and also began dominating the rivalry with the Sun Devils. It culminated in consecutive bowl appearances: in the 1985 Sun Bowl, where a tie with Georgia gave the Wildcats an 8–3–1 record; and the 1986 Aloha Bowl, where a victory over North Carolina allowed the Wildcats to finish with a 9–3 record in his final season.

Smith's tenure with the Wildcats ended with a 48–28–3 record. Seven Arizona players earned All-America honors during his tenure, including two-time consensus All-American linebacker Ricky Hunley and All-Americans linebacker Lamonte Hunley (Ricky's younger brother), Morris Trophy-winning center Joe Tofflemire, safety Allan Durden, placekicker Max Zendejas, linebacker Byron Evans, and safety Chuck Cecil. More than 20 of Smith's Wildcat players went on to play professionally.

=== USC ===
After success at Tulane and Arizona, Smith was hired as USC's first coach without previous Trojan ties since Howard Jones in 1925. His tenure at USC started strong as his first three Trojans teams went 27–8–1, won a then-school-record 19 consecutive Pacific-10 Conference games, earned three consecutive conference titles from 1987 to 1989, and went to three consecutive Rose Bowls.

Smith's 1988 team was arguably his most successful. With Rodney Peete at quarterback, the Trojans started their season 10–0, defeating #3-ranked Oklahoma and #6-ranked UCLA. USC's Rose Bowl berth-clinching win over UCLA that year was its first-ever against the Bruins in Pasadena since they moved to the Rose Bowl in 1982. Smith's USC team entered their final regular season game ranked #2 against the #1-ranked rival Notre Dame; the Fighting Irish defeated the Trojans, 27–10, en route to a national title. The Trojans went on to play in the Rose Bowl, losing to Michigan.

His 1989 team went 9–1–1 in the regular season and beat Michigan in the 1990 Rose Bowl, avenging the previous year's loss.

Smith's next two Trojans teams were not as successful, losing the 1990 John Hancock Bowl (historically known as the Sun Bowl), followed by a difficult 3–8 1991 season that began with a major upset loss at home to unheralded Memphis State. The 1990 season was marked by a strained relationship with quarterback Todd Marinovich, culminating in a heated verbal barrage on Smith in full view of a national TV audience during the 1990 John Hancock Bowl loss, and Marinovich getting arrested for cocaine possession a month later. Marinovich soon left for the NFL after his sophomore year.

After the 1990 season three players were arrested on charges of sexual assault (and later acquitted), and after spring practice there were the arrests and subsequent convictions of two players in a kidnapping-robbery spree. The 1991 season itself was only the third time the Trojans had had a losing season in over 30 years.

The 1992 season proved to be Smith's undoing with USC. The Trojans had a disappointing 6–4–1 regular season that included a 31–31 tie with San Diego State (a game in which the Aztecs' Marshall Faulk shredded the USC defense for over 250 yards), a 31–23 loss to intersectional rival Notre Dame, and a gut-wrenching 38–37 loss to archrival UCLA. The then #23-ranked Trojans accepted a berth in the 1992 Freedom Bowl, a lower tier bowl game in Anaheim, California, against an unranked Fresno State team in the first match between the two programs. Despite being heavy underdogs, the Trent Dilfer-led Bulldogs won in a 24–7 upset victory that angered many USC supporters.

Smith caused further furor after the game in declaring: "Names and logos don't mean anything. You don't beat someone just because of your name and logo." Within days of the Freedom Bowl loss and his commentary, Smith was fired by USC with three years left on his contract.

Smith finished with a 44–25–3 record at USC, 17–17–2 in his final three seasons. During his tenure he coached 13 All-American first teamers, including Heisman Trophy runner-up Rodney Peete, Thorpe Award-winning safety Mark Carrier, linebacker Junior Seau, wide receiver Curtis Conway and defensive tackle Tim Ryan. In all, 33 USC players under Smith were selected in the NFL draft, including six in the first round.

=== Missouri ===
After a year away from coaching, Smith was hired before the 1994 season as the 30th head coach of Missouri, replacing Bob Stull, who had been reassigned as assistant athletic director after five losing seasons. His first two Tigers squads went 3–8–1 and 3–8; however, they improved to 5–6 in 1996. The 1997 Tigers finished with a 7–4 regular-season record, Mizzou's first winning season since 1983. The Tigers even came within a controversial kicked reception of defeating eventual national champion Nebraska at home that season. Mizzou was invited to the 1997 Holiday Bowl, where they were defeated by Colorado State, 35–24.

The Tigers had another 7–4 regular season in 1998, and were able to cap it with a win in the 1998 Insight.com Bowl against West Virginia, 34–31, to end the season 8–4 and ranked #21 in the final AP Poll.

The 1997–98 seasons marked Mizzou's first back-to-back bowl games since 1980-81 under Warren Powers' tenure. Smith was rewarded at the end of the 1998 regular season with a new five-year contract that raised his salary from $161,500 to $180,000 annually; he had become one of just four coaches in NCAA history to take four schools to bowl games.

The Tigers followed their two bowl seasons with two losing seasons that featured a number of blowout losses. The 1999 squad went 4–7, gave up a 21–0 shut-out loss to rival Kansas, and ended the season with three straight blow-out defeats of 37–0 to Oklahoma, 51–14 to Texas A&M and 66–0 to Kansas State. Smith's 2000 Tigers did not fare better, losing to Clemson (62–9), Texas (47–12) and rival Kansas (38–17) on their way to a 3–8 season. Smith was fired on November 18, 2000, immediately after the final game of the season, a 28–24 loss to Kansas State. During his tenure at Missouri, the team compiled a 33–46–1 record.

== Later years ==
After his coaching career ended, Smith moved back to Tucson and worked as a commentator for Arizona football games on Fox Sports Net, and organized weekend instructional camps twice annually. He also voted in the Harris Poll, part of the Bowl Championship Series equation. He was diagnosed with chronic lymphocytic leukemia in 1999, which would ultimately claim his life. He died in Tucson on January 28, 2008.

Smith was married to Cheryl (née Neuenschwander); they had a son, Corby, a daughter, Alicia, and several grandchildren. Corby Smith played at quarterback for both USC and Iowa, graduating from the latter in 1995 and immediately joining his father on the coaching staff of Missouri.

== Head coaching record ==
=== College ===
Year	Team	Overall	Conference	Standing	Bowl/playoffs	Coaches^{#}	AP^{°}
Tulane Green Wave (NCAA Division I / I-A independent) (1976–1979)
1976	Tulane	2–9					
1977	Tulane	3–8					
1978	Tulane	4–7					
1979	Tulane	9–3			L Liberty		
Tulane:		18–27					
Arizona Wildcats (Pacific-10 Conference) (1980–1986)
1980	Arizona	5–6	3–4	T–6th			
1981	Arizona	6–5	4–4	T–6th			
1982	Arizona	6–4–1	4–3–1	5th			
1983	Arizona	7–3–1	4–3–1	5th			
1984	Arizona	7–4	5–2	T–3rd			
1985	Arizona	8–3–1	5–2	T–2nd	T Sun		
1986	Arizona	9–3	5–3	T–4th	W Aloha	10	11
Arizona:		48–28–3	30–21–2				
USC Trojans (Pacific-10 Conference) (1987–1992)
1987	USC	8–4	7–1	T–1st	L Rose	17	18
1988	USC	10–2	8–0	1st	L Rose	9	7
1989	USC	9–2–1	6–0–1	1st	W Rose	9	8
1990	USC	8–4–1	5–2–1	2nd	L John Hancock	22	20
1991	USC	3–8	2–6	8th			
1992	USC	6–5–1	5–3	T–3rd	L Freedom		
USC:		44–25–3	33–12–2				
Missouri Tigers (Big Eight Conference) (1994–1995)
1994	Missouri	3–8–1	2–5	6th			
1995	Missouri	3–8	1–6	T–7th			
Missouri Tigers (Big 12 Conference) (1996–2000)
1996	Missouri	5–6	3–5	4th (North)			
1997	Missouri	7–5	5–3	3rd (North)	L Holiday	23	23
1998	Missouri	8–4	5–3	T–2nd (North)	W Insight.com	25	21
1999	Missouri	4–7	1–7	T–5th (North)			
2000	Missouri	3–8	2–6	T–5th (North)			
Missouri:		33–46–1	19–25				
Total:		143–126–7					
National championship Conference title Conference division title or championship game berth
^{#}Rankings from final Coaches Poll.; ^{°}Rankings from final AP Poll.
