= Grove, West Virginia =

- Unincorporated community
- Location within the state of West Virginia Grove (the United States)
- Coordinates: 39°8′49″N 80°46′18″W
- Country: United States
- State: West Virginia
- County: Doddridge
- Elevation: 899 ft (274 m)
- Time zone: UTC-5 (Eastern (EST))
  - Summer (DST): UTC-4 (EDT)
- GNIS ID: 1554618

Grove is an unincorporated community in Doddridge County, West Virginia, United States. Its post office is closed.

== Notable person ==
- Matthew M. Neely - former Governor of West Virginia
