= Amos Kent =

American football player and lumber salesman (1902–1986)

No. 6
- Position: Center/Guard

Personal information
- Born: January 3, 1902; Kentwood, Louisiana, U.S.
- Died: August 25, 1986 (aged 84); Richardson, Texas, U.S.
- Listed weight: 193 lb (88 kg)

Career information
- High school: Gulf Coast Military Academy
- College: Sewanee (1922–1925)

Awards and highlights
- All-Southern (1925)

Amos Kent (January 3, 1902 – August 25, 1986) was a college football player and lumber salesman.

== Early life ==
Amos Kent was born on January 3, 1902, in Kentwood, Louisiana, to Walter Campbell Kent and Katherine Esther Varnado. His great-grandfather and namesake Amos Kent founded the town of Kentwood in 1850. The older Amos came originally from Chester, New Hampshire.

== Sewanee ==
Amos Kent was a prominent center and guard for the Sewanee Tigers of Sewanee: The University of the South. At Sewanee Kent was a member of Sigma Alpha Epsilon.

=== 1925 ===
He was selected All-Southern.

== Lumber ==
He was once the president of the Amos Kent Lumber Company.
