= John James Davis =

American politician (1835–1916)

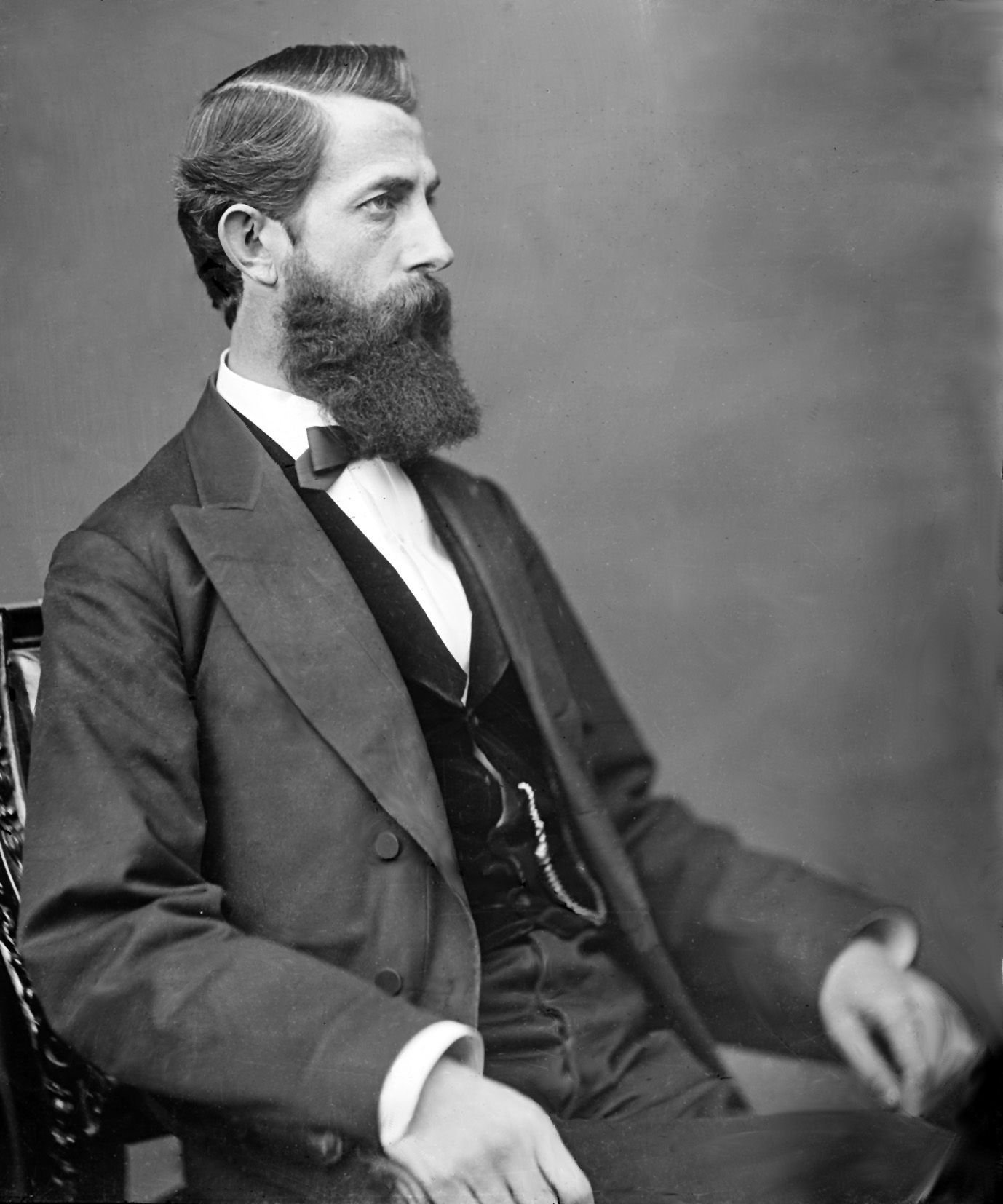

Member of the U.S. House of Representatives from West Virginia's 1st district
- In office March 4, 1871 – March 3, 1875
- Preceded by: Isaac H. Duval
- Succeeded by: Benjamin Wilson

Member of the West Virginia House of Delegates
- In office 1869–1870

Member of the Virginia House of Delegates
- In office 1861

Personal details
- Born: John James Davis; May 5, 1835 Clarksburg, Virginia (now West Virginia), U.S.
- Died: March 19, 1916 (aged 80) Clarksburg, West Virginia, U.S.
- Resting place: Odd Fellows Cemetery; Clarksburg, West Virginia, U.S.
- Party: Democratic
- Other political affiliations: Independent Democrat
- Spouse: Anna Kennedy
- Children: John W. Davis
- Education: Lexington Law School
- Occupation: Lawyer, politician

John James Davis (May 5, 1835 – March 19, 1916) was an American attorney and politician who helped found West Virginia and later served as a United States representative in Congress from that state.

== Early and family life ==
John James Davis was born in Clarksburg, Virginia (now West Virginia) in 1835 to master saddler John Davis and his New York-born wife Eliza Arnold Steen Davis. He had a younger brother, Rezin Caleb Davis (who initially apprenticed with their father, but was a Confederate soldier and later became a lawyer in Kentucky). The family included at least two sisters. Their grandfather Caleb Davis had been born across the Potomac River at Oldtown, Allegheny County, Maryland but had moved to Woodstock, Shenandoah County, Virginia where J.J. Davis's father John Davis had been born. After learning his trade, John Davis moved to Clarksburg shortly before Virginia authorized construction of the Northwestern Turnpike. John Davis served as the Harrison County sheriff, ruling elder in his Presbyterian church and (unlike his son John James Davis) sympathized with the Confederacy and died in 1863. His wife Eliza (J.J. Davis's mother) was a pioneer school teacher in Harrison County, who taught Stonewall Jackson as well as her sons and many other local children. Either the father John Davis or J.J. Davis owned six slaves in Harrison County in 1860, and his brother Rezin Davis owned two slaves—a 17-year-old girl and a one-year-old boy.

Young J.J. Davis attended Northwestern Virginia Academy at Clarksburg (the Harrison County seat). When he was 17, he moved to Lexington, Virginia to attend the Lexington Law School (now the law department of Washington and Lee University). Graduating in 1856, J.J. Davis was admitted to the Virginia bar that same year and began what would become his lifelong legal practice in Clarksburg.

On August 21, 1862, John J. Davis married Anna Kennedy in Baltimore, Maryland, her home city. She was the daughter of a lumber merchant and college-educated. They later had a son, John William Davis (1873–1955), who followed his father's career and became a lawyer and congressman, although he eventually left West Virginia and was the unsuccessful Democratic presidential nominee in 1924. They also had four daughters: Lillie Davis Preston (1863–1939) of Lewisburg, West Virginia; Emma Kennedy Davis (1865–1943) who never married and was secretary of the local Red Cross in World War I as well as assistant chair of the Harrison County Democratic Committee; Anna Holmes Davis Richardson (1869-1945, whose first husband was a Unitarian minister in New York), and Catherine Estelle Davis (1874–1881).

== American Civil War ==
Davis became politically active after the Virginia Secession Convention on April 17, 1861 voted to approve an ordinance of secession over the opposition of many delegates from the northwestern counties, including fellow lawyer John S. Carlile from Harrison County. Carlile called a mass meeting in Clarksburg on April 22 to call Virginia's secession treasonous and consider responses. Davis attended that "Clarksburg Convention."

On May 13–15, J.J. Davis was among seven Harrison County men attending the Wheeling Convention, which established the Restored Government of Virginia.

In June 1861, Harrison County voters elected Davis and John C. Vance to represent them in the Virginia House of Delegates, which met in Wheeling from July 1–26; Davis never served in Richmond, Virginia (the normal meeting place of the Virginia General Assembly, including during the American Civil War). In October, Harrison County voters again elected Vance and Davis as their two delegates to the General Assembly, which met at Wheeling from December 2, 1861 – February 13, 1862, May 6–15, 1862, and December 4, 1862-February 5, 1863 (although Vance resigned on January 2, 1862).

Despite Davis's Unionist advocacy, his father remained a Confederate sympathizer and his brother Rezin enlisted in the Confederate army.

== Postwar career ==
As the war ended, Davis continued his legal practice in Clarksburg, and voters elected him to the West Virginia House of Delegates in 1869. He served one term, in 1870, in that part-time position.

Active in his local Democratic Party, Davis was a delegate to the Democratic National Conventions in 1868, 1876 and 1892. He also was a Mason, a regent of the University of West Virginia, a member of the Board of Visitors of the United States Military Academy at West Point, director of the State Insane Hospital, and a ruling elder in the Southern Presbyterian Church.

== National politics ==
When Republican Isaac H. Duval announced that he would not seek re-election from West Virginia's 1st congressional district in 1870, Davis was the Democratic nominee and won. He served in the 42nd Congress, and was re-elected as an Independent Democrat to the 43rd Congress. He decided against running for re-nomination in 1874, and fellow Democrat Benjamin Wilson won the seat.

His elective political years over, except for stints at the Democratic National Conventions and as a presidential elector for Grover Cleveland, Davis resumed his legal practice in Clarksburg, which came in second in the 1877 contest to become West Virginia's state capital. However, the Republican Party grew stronger in the area, led by Nathan Goff, Jr., who replaced Wilson after the 1882 election. Eventually, Davis practiced with his son, John W. Davis, who began his personal political career by winning election to the West Virginia House of Delegates in 1899. Although the U.S. congressional seat was generally held by Republicans (other than twice briefly held by Democrat John O. Pendleton), Davis lived to see his son win it in 1910, then resign to become U.S. Solicitor General under Democratic President Woodrow Wilson.

== Death and legacy ==
John J. Davis died in Clarksburg on March 19, 1916, and was interred in the Odd Fellows Cemetery, where his wife of nearly 55 years joined him less than a year later. Their daughter Emma, who never married, remained active in Democratic politics in Clarksburg. After serving as Solicitor General, his son John W. Davis would become U.S. Ambassador to Britain, then move to New York.

U.S. House of Representatives
Preceded by Isaac H. Duval	Member of the U.S. House of Representatives from West Virginia's 1st congressional district 1871–1875	Succeeded by Benjamin Wilson
