= Alberta Ramage Neely =

First Lady of West Virginia

- Born: August 27, 1880; Milford, Pennsylvania
- Died: June 30, 1976 (aged 95); Fairmont, West Virginia
- Other names: "Bertie"
- Known for: First lady of West Virginia, 1941-1945

Alberta Ramage Neely (1880–1976) was the wife of former Governor of West Virginia Matthew M. Neely and served as that state's First Lady from 1941 to 1945. She was known to family and friends as "Bertie."

== Formative years ==
Born as Alberta Clair Ramage on August 27, 1880, in Milford, Pennsylvania, Alberta Ramage was a daughter of Benjamin Franklin Ramage and Almira Lavinia (Hefner) Ramage. Following graduation from Fairmont Normal School (now Fairmont State University), she attended Randolph-Macon College in Ashland, Virginia and Emerson College of Elocution in Boston, Massachusetts. In 1903, she married Matthew M. Neely, a native of West Virginia who later achieved nationwide prominence during his long career in politics, a career that began with his election as mayor of Fairmont, West Virginia in 1908.

== Political activities and public service ==
On January 19, 1941, Neely and her husband attended the Inaugural Gala at Constitution Hall in Washington, D.C. as part of a delegation of thirty-two state executives and state representatives who were celebrating the third inauguration of U.S. President Franklin D. Roosevelt. As a first lady during World War II, she also sold war bonds and raised money for servicemen's clubs. In May 1944, she and her husband hosted a dinner party in Charleston, West Virginia for the British Ambassador and his wife, who were visiting the United States to raise funds for the British War Relief Society.

After her husband left office, the couple moved to Washington, D.C., where Matthew Neely served in the United States Senate until his death in 1958. In 1963, her portrait was one of eleven new portraits that were hung in the governor's mansion in Charleston, West Virginia. It was officially presented to the state during an unveiling ceremony on July 10 of that year.

Following the death of her husband, Neely lived in Fairmont, West Virginia, where she died on June 30, 1976.

Honorary titles
Preceded by Isabel Wood Holt	First Lady of West Virginia; 1941 – 1945	Succeeded by Nancy Massie Meadows
