= Beard Heights, West Virginia =

Unincorporated community in West Virginia, United States

- Unincorporated community
- Location within West Virginia Location within the United States
- Coordinates: 38°12′26″N 80°06′26″W
- Country: United States
- State: West Virginia
- County: Pocahontas
- Elevation: 2,484 ft (757 m)
- Time zone: UTC-5 (Eastern (EST))
  - Summer (DST): UTC-4 (EDT)
- Area codes: 304 & 681
- GNIS feature ID: 1553819

Beard Heights is an unincorporated community in Pocahontas County, West Virginia, United States. Beard Heights is located on U.S. Route 219, 1.5 miles (2.4 km) southwest of Marlinton.
