= Peggy Flournoy =

American football and baseball player and coach (1904–1972)

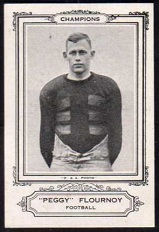

Tulane Green Wave
- Position: Halfback

Personal information
- Born: January 17, 1904; Canton, Mississippi, U.S.
- Died: October 7, 1972 (aged 68); New Orleans, Louisiana, U.S.
- Listed height: 6 ft 1 in (1.85 m)
- Listed weight: 165 lb (75 kg)

Career information
- High school: Rugby Academy
- College: Tulane (1923–1925)

Awards and highlights
- First-team All-American (1925); 2× All-Southern (1924, 1925); Louisiana Sports Hall of Fame

Charles Priestley "Peggy" Flournoy (January 17, 1904 – October 7, 1972) was an American football and baseball player and coach. He was the first Tulane football player selected as a first-team All-American. In 1925, he led the nation in scoring with 128 points, a school record not broken until 2007 by Matt Forte.

== Early life ==
Flournoy attended high school at the Rugby Academy.

== Playing career ==
He played college football at the halfback position for the Tulane Green Wave football team from 1923 to 1925. He stood 6 feet, 1 inch, weighed 165 pounds, and wore number 15. As a senior in 1925, Flournoy led Tulane to an undefeated season and led the nation in scoring with 128 points. At the end of the 1925 season, he was selected by Billy Evans and Norman E. Brown as a first-team halfback on their 1925 College Football All-America Teams. He was also named a second-team All-American by the Associated Press and the All-America Board. He was inducted into the Louisiana Sports Hall of Fame in 1968. He died in New Orleans in 1972.

One account reads "In the South they call "Peggy" Flournoy of Tulane University, the greatest all-round gridder in that section."

== Coaching career ==
Flournoy assisted his alma mater's football team in 1926, and was the baseball coach in 1928.

== See also ==
- List of NCAA major college football yearly scoring leaders
