= 1979 Liberty Bowl =

American college football game

- 21st edition
Penn State Nittany Lions	Tulane Green Wave
(7–4)	(9–2)
Independent	Independent
9	6
Head coach: Joe Paterno	Head coach: Larry Smith
AP / Coaches; NR / 20	AP / Coaches; 15 / 15
	1	2	3	4	Total
Penn State	0	6	0	3	9
Tulane	0	0	0	6	6
- Date: December 22, 1979
- Season: 1979
- Stadium: Liberty Bowl Memorial Stadium
- Location: Memphis, Tennessee
- MVP: Roch Hontas (Tulane QB)
- Favorite: Penn State by 2½ points
- Referee: Courtney Mauzy (ACC)
- Attendance: 50,021

United States TV coverage
- Network: ABC
- Announcers: Keith Jackson, Ara Parseghian, Verne Lundquist

The 1979 Liberty Bowl was the 21st edition of the college football bowl game, held at Liberty Bowl Memorial Stadium in Memphis, Tennessee, on Saturday, December 22. Part of the 1979–80 bowl game season, it matched the Tulane Green Wave and the Penn State Nittany Lions, both independents. In a game without a touchdown, Penn State won 9–6.

== Teams ==
=== Penn State ===
The 1979 Penn State squad finished the regular season with a record of 7–4 and losses against Texas A&M, Nebraska, Miami and Pittsburgh. The appearance marked the third for Penn State in the Liberty Bowl, and the school's 18th overall bowl game.

=== Tulane ===
The 1979 Tulane squad finished the regular season with a record of 9–2 and losses against Rice and West Virginia. The appearance marked the second for Tulane in the Liberty Bowl, and the school's sixth overall bowl game.

== Game summary ==
Scoring summary

Quarter	Time	Drive			Team	Scoring information	Score	
Quarter	Time	Plays	Yards	TOP	Team	Scoring information	Penn State	Tulane
2	9:57				Penn State	33-yard field goal by Herb Menhardt	3	0
2	1:59				Penn State	27-yard field goal by Menhardt	6	0
4	12:30				Tulane	26-yard field goal by Eddie Murray	6	3
4	2:40				Tulane	26-yard field goal by Murray	6	6
4	0:18				Penn State	20-yard field goal by Menhardt	9	6
"TOP" = time of possession. For other American football terms, see Glossary of American football.							9	6
