= Roch Hontas =

American football player (born 1957)

Profile
- Position: Quarterback

Personal information
- Born: April 1957 (age 69)

Career information
- High school: McKinley (Canton, OH)
- College: Tulane (1976–1979)

Roch Brian Hontas (born April 1957) is a former American football quarterback. He grew up in Canton, Ohio, and played college football for Tulane from 1976 to 1979.

== Early life ==
Hontas attended McKinley High School in Canton, Ohio, and tallied 2,236 career passing yards at McKinley.

== Tulane ==
Hontas played college football for the Tulane Green Wave from 1976 to 1979. His 63.4% completion percentage in 1977 was second best in the country. On October 1, 1977, he set Tulane school records for passing yards in a game (373), pass attempts (42), completions 933), and consecutive passes without an interception (32). As a senior in 1979, he ranked among the leading quarterbacks in major-college football with 21 passing touchdowns (3rd), 458 total plays (4th), 2,442 total yards (5th), 215 pass completions (5th), 367 pass attempts (5th), 2,345 passing yards (6th), and 213.2 yards gained per game play (6th).

== Later life ==
In April 1980, in advance of the 1980 NFL draft, Hontas announced that he would not play professional football. He had been accepted by Tulane School of Medicine, that medicine was his life going forward, and he would not even answer the phone if he were to be drafted. He became an orthopedic surgeon in Louisiana and an assistant professor of orthopedics at Tulane School of Medicine..
