= Wilsonburg, West Virginia =

- Unincorporated community
- Location within West Virginia Location within the United States
- Coordinates: 39°17′33″N 80°23′46″W
- Country: United States
- State: West Virginia
- County: Harrison
- Elevation: 988 ft (301 m)
- Time zone: UTC-5 (Eastern (EST))
  - Summer (DST): UTC-4 (EDT)
- ZIP code: 26461
- Area codes: 304 & 681
- GNIS feature ID: 1556000

Wilsonburg is an unincorporated community in Harrison County, West Virginia, United States. Wilsonburg is 3 miles (4.8 km) west of Clarksburg.
