= Matthew M. Neely =

American politician (1874–1958)

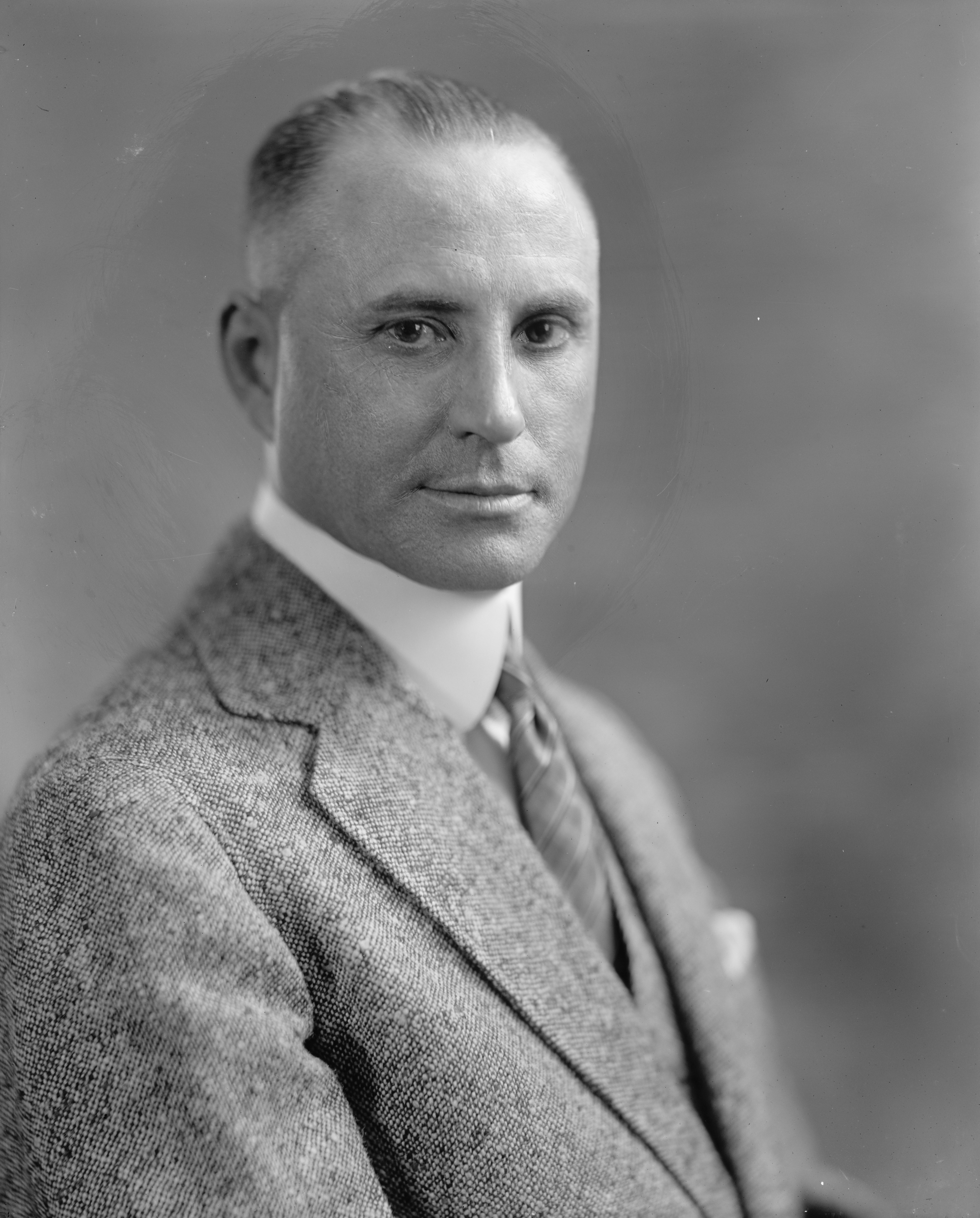
- Portrait by Harris & Ewing c. 1920s

United States Senator from West Virginia
- In office January 3, 1949 – January 18, 1958
- Preceded by: Chapman Revercomb
- Succeeded by: John D. Hoblitzell Jr.
- In office March 4, 1931 – January 12, 1941
- Preceded by: Guy D. Goff
- Succeeded by: Joseph Rosier
- In office March 4, 1923 – March 3, 1929
- Preceded by: Howard Sutherland
- Succeeded by: Henry D. Hatfield

21st Governor of West Virginia
- In office January 13, 1941 – January 15, 1945
- Preceded by: Homer A. Holt
- Succeeded by: Clarence W. Meadows

Member of the U.S. House of Representatives from West Virginia's 1st district
- In office January 3, 1945 – January 3, 1947
- Preceded by: A. C. Schiffler
- Succeeded by: Francis J. Love
- In office October 14, 1913 – March 3, 1921
- Preceded by: John W. Davis
- Succeeded by: Benjamin L. Rosenbloom

Personal details
- Born: Matthew Mansfield Neely; November 9, 1874 Grove, West Virginia, U.S.
- Died: January 18, 1958 (aged 83) Washington, D.C., U.S.
- Resting place: Woodlawn Cemetery; Fairmont, West Virginia
- Party: Democratic
- Spouse: Alberta Ramage Neely
- Profession: Politician

Military service
- Allegiance: United States
- Branch/service: United States Army
- Rank: Private
- Battles/wars: Spanish–American War

Matthew Mansfield Neely (November 9, 1874 – January 18, 1958) was an American Democratic politician from West Virginia. He is the only West Virginian to serve in both houses of the United States Congress and as the 21st governor of West Virginia. He is also the only person to have held a full term in both Senate seats from the state.

== Biography ==
He was born in Grove, West Virginia on November 9, 1874. He attended Salem College of West Virginia (now Salem International University), but did not earn a degree. At the outbreak of the Spanish–American War he entered the United States Army as a private. Following the war, he earned a law degree from West Virginia University. In 1903, he married Alberta Ramage.

He entered the practice of law in Fairmont, West Virginia and was elected its mayor in 1908.

== Congressman, senator, and governor (1913-1958) ==
Neely was elected as a Congressman to an unexpired term in 1913 and was reelected in 1914, 1916, and 1918. In the 1920 election, he was defeated, due to his association with the policies of Woodrow Wilson.

In 1922, Neely ran for, and was elected to, the United States Senate as a Democrat. He was defeated for reelection in 1928. He then ran for the state's other Senate seat in 1930 and was elected. He was reelected in 1936. In 1940 he ran for governor and resigned the remaining two years of his Senate term.

He soon regretted his decision and strongly considered resigning to run for his old Senate seat in 1942. In later life he expressed strong regret about his term as governor. During Neely's term as governor, child welfare laws were reformed and a State Planning Board was created. Upon the expiration of his term as governor in 1944, he ran for and was elected to his old House seat. He was defeated for reelection in 1946.

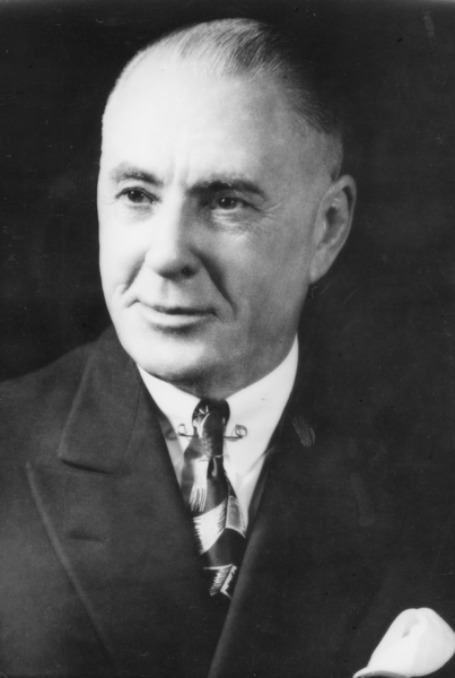
Neely during his later career

In 1948, he was again elected to the Senate, beginning his third non-consecutive term there. He served until his death in 1958, after which he was interred in Fairmont's Woodlawn Cemetery.

Neely was a New Deal Democrat and advocated for organized labor and civil rights. During his Senate terms in the 1930s he sponsored "anti-lynching" legislation, but it never passed. Neely did not sign the 1956 Southern Manifesto despite school segregation being legally required in West Virginia until Brown v. Board of Education (1954), but he did not vote on the Civil Rights Act of 1957. When he returned to the Senate after a term as governor and another term in the House of Representatives, he had lost his seniority, although he had many friends among the senior senators. He was assigned the chairmanship of the Senate Committee on the District of Columbia, where he became the preeminent proponent of "home rule" for the District, effectively urging that the government of the District of Columbia be turned over to its citizens. He died in 1958, several years before the home rule he had sponsored finally passed both houses of Congress.

Neely was also a mentor to then West Virginia attorney and later member of Congress George W. Crockett, Jr., who credited Neely with converting him from a Lincoln Republican to a New Deal Democrat.

Neely was known through his career as a master orator. In his honor, Fairmont State University sponsors an annual oratory contest named for him.

His grandson was Richard Neely, an author and politician who served as the chief justice of the West Virginia Supreme Court of Appeals.

== Legislation ==
Neely introduced the first Department of Peace bill in 1935. He reintroduced the bill in 1937 and 1939. In 1937, along with Senator Homer Bone and Representative Warren Magnuson, Neely introduced the National Cancer Institute Act, which Franklin Roosevelt signed into law on August 5 of that year. The Neely Anti-Block Booking Act gradually broke film studios' control of movie theaters.

== See also ==
- List of members of the United States Congress who died in office (1950–1999)

U.S. House of Representatives
Preceded by John W. Davis	Member of the U.S. House of Representatives from West Virginia's 1st congressional district October 14, 1913 – March 3, 1921	Succeeded by Benjamin L. Rosenbloom
Preceded by A. C. Schiffler	Member of the U.S. House of Representatives from West Virginia's 1st congressional district January 3, 1945 – January 3, 1947	Succeeded by Francis J. Love
U.S. Senate
Preceded by Howard Sutherland	U.S. senator (Class 1) from West Virginia; March 4, 1923 – March 3, 1929; Served alongside: Davis Elkins, Guy D. Goff	Succeeded by Henry D. Hatfield
Preceded by Guy D. Goff	U.S. senator (Class 2) from West Virginia; March 4, 1931 – January 12, 1941; Served alongside: Henry D. Hatfield, Rush D. Holt	Succeeded by Joseph Rosier
Preceded by W. Chapman Revercomb	U.S. senator (Class 2) from West Virginia; January 3, 1949 – January 18, 1958; Served alongside: Harley M. Kilgore, William R. Laird, W. Chapman Revercomb	Succeeded by John D. Hoblitzell
Political offices
Preceded by Homer A. Holt	Governor of West Virginia; January 13, 1941 – January 15, 1945	Succeeded by Clarence W. Meadows
Party political offices
Preceded by William E. Chilton	Democratic nominee for U.S. Senator from West Virginia (Class 1); 1922, 1928	Succeeded by Rush D. Holt
Preceded by William E. Chilton	Democratic nominee for U.S. Senator from West Virginia (Class 2); 1930, 1936	Succeeded by Joseph Rosier
Preceded by Homer A. Holt	Democratic nominee for Governor of West Virginia; 1940	Succeeded by Clarence W. Meadows
Preceded by Joseph Rosier	Democratic nominee for U.S. Senator from West Virginia (Class 2); 1942, 1948, 1954	Succeeded by Jennings Randolph
