= 1925 Southern Conference football season =

- League: NCAA
- Sport: College football
- Duration: September 19, 1925 through January 1, 1926
- Teams: 22

Regular Season
- Season champions: Alabama; Tulane

Football seasons
- 1924 1926

1925 Southern Conference football standings
	Conf.					Overall
Team	W		L		T	W		L		T
No. 2 Alabama +	7	–	0	–	0	10	–	0	–	0
No. 6 Tulane +	5	–	0	–	0	9	–	0	–	1
North Carolina	4	–	0	–	1	7	–	1	–	1
Washington and Lee	5	–	1	–	0	5	–	5	–	0
Virginia	4	–	1	–	1	7	–	1	–	1
Georgia Tech	4	–	1	–	1	6	–	2	–	1
Kentucky	4	–	2	–	0	6	–	3	–	0
Florida	3	–	2	–	0	8	–	2	–	0
Auburn	3	–	2	–	1	5	–	3	–	1
VPI	3	–	3	–	1	5	–	3	–	2
Vanderbilt	3	–	3	–	0	6	–	3	–	0
Tennessee	2	–	2	–	1	5	–	2	–	1
South Carolina	2	–	2	–	0	7	–	3	–	0
Georgia	2	–	4	–	0	4	–	5	–	0
Sewanee	1	–	4	–	0	4	–	4	–	1
Mississippi A&M	1	–	4	–	0	3	–	4	–	1
VMI	1	–	5	–	0	5	–	5	–	0
LSU	0	–	2	–	1	5	–	3	–	1
NC State	0	–	4	–	1	3	–	5	–	1
Ole Miss	0	–	4	–	0	5	–	5	–	0
Clemson	0	–	4	–	0	1	–	7	–	0
Maryland	0	–	4	–	0	2	–	5	–	1
+ – Conference co-champions; Rankings from Dickinson System

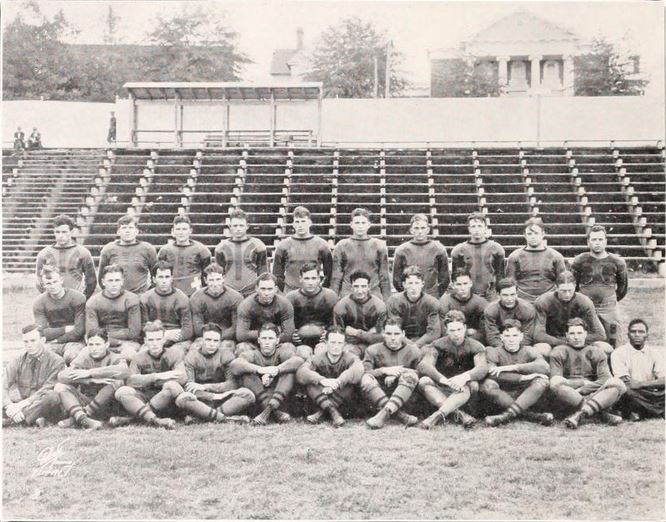
The 1925 Clemson Tigers football team

The 1925 Southern Conference football season was the college football games played by the member schools of the Southern Conference as part of the 1925 college football season. The season began on September 19. 1925 saw the south's widespread use of the forward pass.

In the annual Rose Bowl game, the SoCon champion Alabama Crimson Tide defeated the heavily favored PCC champion Washington Huskies by a single point, 20–19, and became the first southern team ever to win a Rose Bowl. It is commonly referred to as "the game that changed the south." Alabama halfback Johnny Mack Brown was the Rose Bowl game's MVP. Alabama was retroactively named as national champion for 1925 by several major selectors, along with Dartmouth.

Tulane back Peggy Flournoy led the nation in scoring with his 128 points, a school record not broken until 2007 by Matt Forte. With also Lester Lautenschlaeger in the backfield to lead the Green Wave, Tulane beat Northwestern i a game which helped herald the arrival of Southern football.

The Georgia Tech team, led by Doug Wycoff, had one of the best defenses in school history.

== Season overview ==
=== Results and team statistics ===
Conf. Rank	Team	Head coach	Overall record	Conf. record	PPG	PAG
1 (tie)	Alabama	Wallace Wade	10–0-0	7–0-0	**29.7**	2.6
1 (tie)	Tulane	Clark Shaughnessy	9–0–1	5–0-0	24.6	3.2
3	North Carolina	Bob Fetzer/Bill Fetzer	7–1–1	4–0–1	13.7	**2.2**
4	Washington and Lee	James DeHart	5–5-0	5–1-0	11.1	10.4
5	Virginia	Greasy Neale	7–1–1	4–1–1	16.0	3.4
6	Georgia Tech	William Alexander	6–2–1	4–1–1	11.3	5.3
7	Kentucky	Fred Murphy	6–3-0	4–2-0	14.3	11.0
8	Florida	Tom Sebring	8–2-0	3–2-0	10.2	10.8
9	Auburn	Dave Morey	5–3–1	3–2–1	9.0	12.7
10 (tie)	VPI	Ben Cubbage	5–3–2	3–3–1	3.9	5.2
10 (tie)	Vanderbilt	Dan McGugin	6–3-0	3–3-0	17.6	7.0
10 (tie)	Tennessee	M. B. Banks	5–2–1	2–2–1	16.1	9.1
10 (tie)	South Carolina	Branch Bocock	7–3-0	2–2-0	15.0	2.7
14 (tie)	Georgia	Kid Woodruff	4–5-0	2–4-0	14.8	10.1
14 (tie)	VMI	Blandy Clarkson	5–5-0	2–4-0	15.3	10.8
16 (tie)	Sewanee	M. S. Bennett	4–4–1	1–4-0	13.1	9.9
16 (tie)	Mississippi A&M	Bernie Bierman	3–4–1	1–4-0	12.6	7.5
18	LSU	Mike Donahue	5–3–1	0–2–1	10.0	7.8
19 (tie)	NC State	Gus Tebell	3–5–1	0–4–1	5.7	8.0
19 (tie)	Ole Miss	Homer Hazel	5–5-0	0–4-0	14.7	8.7
19 (tie)	Maryland	Curley Byrd	3–5-0	0–4-0	7.9	11.1
19 (tie)	Clemson	Bud Saunders	1–7-0	0–4-0	2.3	20.0

Key

PPG = Average of points scored per game
PAG = Average of points allowed per game

=== Regular season ===
Index to colors and formatting
Non-conference matchup; SoCon member won
Non-conference matchup; SoCon member lost
Non-conference matchup; tie
Conference matchup

SoCon teams in bold.

==== Week One ====
Date	Visiting team	Home team	Site	Result	Attendance	Reference
September 19	Wofford	**VMI**	Alumni Field • Lexington, Virginia	**W** 9–0		
September 19	Lynchburg	**VPI**	Miles Field • Blacksburg, Virginia	**W** 10–0		

==== Week Two ====
Date	Visiting team	Home team	Site	Result	Attendance	Reference
September 25	Richmond	**NC State**	Riddick Stadium • Raleigh, North Carolina	**W** 20–0		
September 26	Union (TN)	**Alabama**	Denny Field • Tuscaloosa, Alabama	**W** 53–0		
September 26	**Auburn**	Birmingham–Southern	Munger Bowl • Birmingham, Alabama	**W** 25–0		
September 26	Presbyterian	**Clemson**	Riggs Field • Calhoun, South Carolina	**L** 14–0		
September 26	**Georgia**	Mercer	Centennial Stadium • Macon, Georgia	**W** 32–0		
September 26	Oglethorpe	**Georgia Tech**	Grant Field • Atlanta, Georgia	**W** 13–7	10,000	
September 26	Maryville (TN)	**Kentucky**	Stoll Field • Lexington, Kentucky	**W** 13–6		
September 26	Louisiana Normal	**LSU**	Tiger Stadium • Baton Rouge, Louisiana	**W** 27–0		
September 26	Washington College	**Maryland**	Byrd Stadium • College Park, Maryland	**W** 13–0		
September 26	Wake Forest	**North Carolina**	Emerson Field • Chapel Hill, North Carolina	**L** 6–0	7,000	
September 26	Jonesboro A&M	**Ole Miss**	Hemingway Stadium • Oxford, Mississippi	**W** 53–0		
September 26	Bryson College	**Sewanee**	Hardee Field • Sewanee, Tennessee	**W** 14–0		
September 26	Erskine	**South Carolina**	University Field • Columbia, South Carolina	**W** 33–0		
September 26	Louisiana College	**Tulane**	New Orleans, Louisiana	**W** 77–0	4,500	
September 26	Middle Tennessee State Teachers	**Vanderbilt**	Dudley Field • Nashville, Tennessee	**W** 27–0		
September 26	Hampden–Sydney	**Virginia**	Lambeth Field • Charlottesville, Virginia	**W** 40–0		
September 26	Emory & Henry	**VMI**	Alumni Field • Lexington, Virginia	**W** 46–0		
September 26	Roanoke	**VPI**	Miles Field • Blacksburg, Virginia	**W** 28–0		

==== Week Three ====
Date	Visiting team	Home team	Site	Result	Attendance	Reference
October 2	Birmingham–Southern	**Alabama**	Denny Field • Tuscaloosa, Alabama	**W** 50–7		
October 3	**Auburn**	**Clemson**	Riggs Field • Calhoun, South Carolina	**AUB** 13–6		
October 3	Mercer	**Florida**	Fleming Field • Gainesville, Florida	**W** 24–0		
October 3	**VMI**	**Georgia Tech**	Grant Field • Atlanta	**GT** 33–0		
October 3	**Kentucky**	Chicago	Stagg Field • Chicago	**L** 9–0		
October 3	Louisiana-Lafayette	**LSU**	Tiger Stadium • Baton Rouge, Louisiana	**W** 38–0		
October 3	Millsaps	**Mississippi A&M**	Davis Wade Stadium • Starkville, Mississippi	**W** 34–0		
October 3	**North Carolina**	**South Carolina**	Columbia, South Carolina	**UNC** 7–0		
October 3	**North Carolina State**	Duke	Durham, North Carolina	**W** 13–0		
October 3	Middle Tennessee State	**Sewanee**	McGee Field • Sewanee, Tennessee	**W** 53–0		
October 3	Emory & Henry	**Tennessee**	Shields–Watkins Field • Knoxville, Tennessee	**W** 51–0		
October 3	Missouri	**Tulane**	New Orleans, Louisiana	**T** 6–6		
October 3	Henderson-Brown	**Vanderbilt**	Dudley Field • Nashville, Tennessee	**W** 41–0		
October 3	**Virginia**	**Georgia**	Sanford Field • Athens, Georgia	**UVA** 7–6		
October 3	Hampden-Sydney	**Virginia Tech**	Blacksburg, Virginia	**W** 13–3		
October 3	Furman	**Washington & Lee**	Lexington, Virginia	**L** 20–15		

==== Week Four ====
Date	Visiting team	Home team	Site	Result	Attendance	Reference
October 9	Florida Southern	**Florida**	Fleming Field • Gainesville, Florida	**W** 9–0		
October 10	Hampden-Sydney	**Florida**	Fleming Field • Gainesville, Florida	**W** 22–6		
October 10	**Alabama**	**LSU**	Tiger Stadium • Baton Rouge, Louisiana	**ALA** 42–0		
October 10	**Virginia Tech**	**Auburn**	Drake Field • Auburn, Alabama	**AUB** 19–0		
October 10	**Clemson**	**Kentucky**	Stoll Field • Lexington, Kentucky	**UK** 19–6		
October 10	**Georgia**	Yale	Yale Bowl • New Haven, Connecticut	**L** 35–7		
October 10	**Georgia Tech**	Penn State	Bronx, New York	**W** 16–7		
October 10	**Maryland**	Rutgers	Philadelphia	**W** 16–0		
October 10	Ouachita	**Mississippi A&M**	Davis Wade Stadium • Starkville, Mississippi	**T** 3–3		
October 10	**North Carolina**	Duke	Durham, North Carolina	**W** 41–0		
October 10	**Sewanee**	Texas A&M	Dallas, Texas	**T** 6–6		
October 10	Maryville	**Tennessee**	Shields–Watkins Field • Knoxville, Tennessee	**W** 13–0		
October 10	**Ole Miss**	**Tulane**	New Orleans	**TUL** 26–7		
October 10	**Vanderbilt**	Texas Longhorns football	Fair Park Stadium • Dallas	**W** 14–6		
October 10	Richmond	**Virginia**	Lambeth Field • Charlottesville, Virginia	**W** 19–0		
October 10	Roanoke	**VMI**	Lexington, Virginia	**W** 17–14		
October 10	**Washington & Lee**	Princeton	Palmer Stadium • Princeton, New Jersey	**L** 15–6		
October 11	**South Carolina**	**North Carolina State**	Riddick Stadium • Raleigh, North Carolina	**SCAR** 7–6		

==== Week Five ====
Date	Visiting team	Home team	Site	Result	Attendance	Reference
October 15	**North Carolina**	North Carolina State	Riddick Stadium • Raleigh, North Carolina	**UNC** 17–0		
October 16	Wofford	South Carolina	Columbia, South Carolina	**W** 6–0		
October 17	**Sewanee**	Alabama	Rickwood Field • Birmingham, Alabama	**ALA** 27–0		
October 17	**Florida**	Georgia Tech	Grant Field • Atlanta	**GT** 23–7		
October 17	Furman	Georgia	Augusta, Georgia	**W** 21–0		
October 17	LSU Freshmen	LSU	Tiger Stadium • Baton Rouge, Louisiana	**W** 6–0		
October 17	**Virginia Tech**	Maryland	Washington, D. C.	**VT** 3–0		
October 17	Union (TN)	Ole Miss	Hemingway Stadium • Oxford, Mississippi	**W** 7–6		
October 17	**Mississippi A&M**	Tulane	Second Tulane Stadium • New Orleans, Louisiana	**TUL** 25–3		
October 17	**Tennessee**	Vanderbilt	Dudley Field • Nashville, Tennessee	**VAN** 34–7		
October 17	**VMI**	Virginia	Lambeth Field • Charlottesville, Virginia	**UVA** 18–10		
October 17	**Washington & Lee**	Kentucky	Stoll Field • Lexington, Kentucky	**W&L** 25–0		

==== Week Six ====
Date	Visiting team	Home team	Site	Result	Attendance	Reference
October 22	**Clemson**	**South Carolina**	Columbia, South Carolina	**SCAR** 33–0		
October 24	**Alabama**	**Georgia Tech**	Grant Field • Atlanta	**ALA** 7–0		
October 24	Howard	**Auburn**	Rickwood Field • Birmingham, Alabama	**W** 7–6		
October 24	Wake Forest	**Florida**	Fleming Field • Gainesville, Florida	**W** 24–3		
October 24	**Sewanee**	**Kentucky**	Stoll Field • Lexington, Kentucky	**UK** 14–0		
October 24	**LSU**	**Tennessee**	Shields–Watkins Field • Knoxville, Tennessee	**T** 0–0		
October 24	**North Carolina**	Mercer	Macon, Georgia	**W** 3–0		
October 24	**Ole Miss**	**Mississippi A&M**	Jackson, Mississippi	**MSA&M** 6–0		
October 24	**Tulane**	Northwestern	Chicago	**W** 18–7		
October 24	**Vanderbilt**	**Georgia**	Sanford Field • Athens, Georgia	**UGA** 26–7		
October 24	**Virginia**	**Maryland**	Lambeth Field • Charlottesville, Virginia	**UVA** 6–0		
October 24	**North Carolina State**	**VMI**	Richmond, Virginia	**VMI** 27–6		
October 24	**Virginia Tech**	**Washington & Lee**	Lynchburg, Virginia	**W&L** 20–0		

==== Week Seven ====
Date	Visiting team	Home team	Site	Result	Attendance	Reference
October 28	**South Carolina**	The Citadel	County Fairgrounds • Orangeburg, South Carolina	**W** 30–6		
October 29	**Clemson**	Wofford	Spartanburg, South Carolina	**L** 13–0		
October 31	**Mississippi A&M**	**Alabama**	Denny Field • Tuscaloosa, Alabama	**ALA** 6–0		
October 31	**Tulane**	**Auburn**	Cramton Bowl • Montgomery, Alabama	**TUL** 13–0		
October 31	**Georgia**	**Tennessee**	Shields–Watkins Field • Knoxville, Tennessee	**TENN** 12–7		
October 31	Rollins	**Florida**	Fleming Field • Gainesville, Florida	**W** 61–0		
October 31	Notre Dame	**Georgia Tech**	Grant Field • Atlanta	**L** 13–0		
October 31	**Kentucky**	Centre	Danville, Kentucky	**W** 16–0		
October 31	**LSU**	Arkansas	Fair Grounds Field • Shreveport, Louisiana	**L** 12–0		
October 31	**North Carolina**	**Maryland**	Baltimore, Maryland	**UNC** 16–0		
October 31	Davidson	**North Carolina State**	Riddick Stadium • Raleigh, North Carolina	**L** 9–0		
October 31	**Sewanee**	Chattanooga	Chattanooga, Tennessee	**W** 28–0		
October 31	**South Carolina**	**Virginia Tech**	Richmond, Virginia	**VT** 6–0		
October 31	**Ole Miss**	**Vanderbilt**	Dudley Field • Nashville, Tennessee	**VAN** 7–0		
October 31	Lynchburg	**VMI**	Lexington, Virginia	**W** 33–0		
October 31	**Washington & Lee**	West Virginia	Charleston, West Virginia	**L** 21–0		

==== Week Eight ====
Date	Visiting team	Home team	Site	Result	Attendance	Reference
November 7	**Kentucky**	**Alabama**	Rickwood Field • Birmingham, Alabama	**ALA** 31–0		
November 7	**Auburn**	**Georgia**	McClung Stadium • Columbus, Georgia	**UGA** 34–0		
November 7	**Florida**	**Clemson**	Riggs Field • Calhoun, South Carolina	**FLA** 42–0		
November 7	**Georgia Tech**	**Vanderbilt**	Dudley Field • Nashville, Tennessee	**GT** 7–0		
November 7	Rice	**LSU**	Tiger Stadium • Baton Rouge, Louisiana	**W** 6–0		
November 7	**Maryland**	Yale	Yale Bowl • New Haven, Connecticut	**L** 43–14		
November 7	Mississippi College	**Mississippi A&M**	Davis Wade Stadium • Starkville, Mississippi	**W** 46–0		
November 7	**North Carolina**	**VMI**	Richmond, Virginia	**UNC** 23–11		
November 7	**North Carolina State**	**Virginia Tech**	Blacksburg, Virginia	**T** 0–0		
November 7	**Ole Miss**	**Sewanee**	Chattanooga, Tennessee	**SEW** 10–9		
November 7	**Tennessee**	Centre	Danville, Kentucky	**W** 12–0		
November 7	Louisiana Tech	**Tulane**	New Orleans, Louisiana	**W** 37–9		
November 7	**Virginia**	**Washington & Lee**	Wilson Field • Lexington, Virginia	**W&L** 12–0		

==== Week Nine ====
Date	Visiting team	Home team	Site	Result	Attendance	Reference
November 14	**Florida**	**Alabama**	Cramton Bowl • Montgomery, Alabama	**ALA** 34–0		
November 14	**Vanderbilt**	**Auburn**	Rickwood Field • Birmingham, Alabama	**AUB** 10–9		
November 14	**Clemson**	The Citadel	Charleston, South Carolina	**W** 6–0		
November 14	**Georgia**	**Georgia Tech**	Grant Field • Atlanta	**GT** 3–0		
November 14	**Kentucky**	**VMI**	Charleston, West Virginia	**UK** 7–0		
November 14	**LSU**	Loyola	New Orleans	**W** 13–0		
November 14	**Ole Miss**	Mississippi College	Clinton, Mississippi	**W** 19–7		
November 14	Davidson	**North Carolina**	Emerson Field • Chapel Hill, North Carolina	**W** 13–0		
November 14	Wake Forest	**North Carolina State**	Riddick Stadium • Raleigh, North Carolina	**W** 6–0		
November 14	**South Carolina**	Furman	Greenville, South Carolina	**L** 2–0		
November 14	**Mississippi A&M**	**Tennessee**	Shields–Watkins Field • Knoxville, Tennessee	**TENN** 14–9		
November 14	**Sewanee**	**Tulane**	New Orleans	**TUL** 14–0		
November 14	**Virginia Tech**	**Virginia**	Lambeth Field • Charlottesville, Virginia	**UVA** 10–0		
November 14	**Washington & Lee**	**Maryland**	Byrd Stadium • College Park, Maryland	**W&L** 7–3		

==== Week Ten ====
Date	Visiting team	Home team	Site	Result	Attendance	Reference
November 20	Presbyterian	South Carolina	Columbia, South Carolina	**W** 21–0		
November 21	**Mississippi A&M**	Florida	Tampa, Florida	**FLA** 12–0		
November 21	Rhodes	Ole Miss	Hemingway Stadium • Oxford, Mississippi	**W** 31–0		
November 21	**Tulane**	LSU	Tiger Stadium • Baton Rouge, Louisiana	**TUL** 16–0		
November 21	**Sewanee**	Vanderbilt	Dudley Field • Nashville, Tennessee	**VAN** 19–7		
November 21	Randolph-Macon	Virginia	Lambeth Field • Charlottesville, Virginia	**W** 41–0		
November 21	**North Carolina State**	Washington & Lee	Lexington, Virginia	**W&L** 12–0		

==== Week Eleven ====
Date	Visiting team	Home team	Site	Result	Attendance	Reference
November 26	**Georgia**	**Alabama**	Rickwood Field • Birmingham, Alabama	**ALA** 27–0		
November 26	**Auburn**	**Georgia Tech**	Grant Field • Atlanta	**T** 7–7		
November 26	**Clemson**	Furman	Greenville, South Carolina	**L** 26–0		
November 26	**Washington & Lee**	**Florida**	Jacksonville, Florida	**FLA** 17–14		
November 26	**Maryland**	Johns Hopkins	Baltimore	**W** 17–14		
November 26	**Ole Miss**	Millsaps	Jackson, Mississippi	**W** 21–0		
November 26	**North Carolina**	**Virginia**	Lambeth Field • Charlottesville, Virginia	**T** 3–3		
November 26	**Tennessee**	**Kentucky**	Stoll Field • Lexington, Kentucky	**UK** 23–20		
November 26	**Tulane**	Centenary	Shreveport, Louisiana	**W** 14–0		
November 26	**VMI**	**Virginia Tech**	Roanoke, Virginia	**VT** 7–0		
November 28	Centre	**South Carolina**	Columbia, South Carolina	**W** 20–0		

=== Postseason ===
==== Bowl games ====
Date	Bowl Game	Site	SIAA Team	Opponent	Score
January 1, 1926	Rose Bowl	Rose Bowl • Pasadena, California	**Alabama**	Washington	**ALA** 20–19

== Awards and honors ==
=== All-Americans ===
- E – J. G. Lowe, Tennessee (AP-3, BEHR)
- E – Gus Merkle, Georgia Tech (BEHR)
- T – Goldy Goldstein, Florida (BEHR)
- T – Bob Rives, Vanderbilt (BEHR)
- G – Bill Buckler, Alabama (AP-2; WE-3, BEHR)
- G – Walt Godwin, Georgia Tech (COL-2; RKN, BEHR)
- C – Amos Kent, Sewanee (BEHR)
- QB – Lester Lautenschlaeger, Tulane (COL-3)
- QB – Edgar C. Jones, Florida (BEHR)
- HB – Peggy Flournoy, Tulane (AAB-2; AP-2; COL-3; NEA; BE-1; HR [qb]; NB-1; WE–3 [qb], BEHR)
- HB – Johnny Mack Brown, Alabama (AP-3, BEHR)
- FB – Pooley Hubert, Alabama (COL-2, AAB-2 [hb]; WE-2, NB-2 [qb], BEHR [qb])
- FB – Doug Wycoff, Georgia Tech (BEHR)

=== All-Southern team ===
The following were selected by the composite All-Southern team compiled by the Associated Press.

Position	Name	First-team selectors	Team
QB	Pooley Hubert	AP	Alabama
HB	Peggy Flournoy	AP	Tulane
HB	Johnny Mack Brown	AP	Alabama
FB	Doug Wycoff	AP	Georgia Tech
E	J. G. Lowe	AP	Tennessee
T	Bob Rives	AP	Vanderbilt
G	Bill Buckler	AP	Alabama
C	Amos Kent	AP	Sewanee
G	Irish Levy	AP	Tulane
T	Goldy Goldstein	AP	Florida
E	Smack Thompson	AP	Georgia
