= 1925 VPI Gobblers football team =

American college football season

1925 VPI Gobblers football
- Conference: Southern Conference
- Record: 5–3–2 (3–3–1 SoCon)
- Head coach: B. C. Cubbage (5th season)
- Captain: Joseph Henry Moran
- Home stadium: Miles Field

1925 Southern Conference football standings
	Conf.					Overall
Team	W		L		T	W		L		T
No. 2 Alabama +	7	–	0	–	0	10	–	0	–	0
No. 6 Tulane +	5	–	0	–	0	9	–	0	–	1
North Carolina	4	–	0	–	1	7	–	1	–	1
Washington and Lee	5	–	1	–	0	5	–	5	–	0
Virginia	4	–	1	–	1	7	–	1	–	1
Georgia Tech	4	–	1	–	1	6	–	2	–	1
Kentucky	4	–	2	–	0	6	–	3	–	0
Florida	3	–	2	–	0	8	–	2	–	0
Auburn	3	–	2	–	1	5	–	3	–	1
VPI	3	–	3	–	1	5	–	3	–	2
Vanderbilt	3	–	3	–	0	6	–	3	–	0
Tennessee	2	–	2	–	1	5	–	2	–	1
South Carolina	2	–	2	–	0	7	–	3	–	0
Georgia	2	–	4	–	0	4	–	5	–	0
Sewanee	1	–	4	–	0	4	–	4	–	1
Mississippi A&M	1	–	4	–	0	3	–	4	–	1
VMI	1	–	5	–	0	5	–	5	–	0
LSU	0	–	2	–	1	5	–	3	–	1
NC State	0	–	4	–	1	3	–	5	–	1
Ole Miss	0	–	4	–	0	5	–	5	–	0
Clemson	0	–	4	–	0	1	–	7	–	0
Maryland	0	–	4	–	0	2	–	5	–	1
+ – Conference co-champions; Rankings from Dickinson System

The 1925 VPI Gobblers football team was an American football team that represented Virginia Polytechnic Institute as a member of the Southern Conference during the 1925 season. In its fifth season under head coach B. C. Cubbage, VPI compiled a 5–3–2 record (3–3–1 against conference opponents), finished in tenth place in the Southern Conference, and was outscored by a total of 52 to 39. The team played its home games at Miles Field in Blacksburg, Virginia.

== Schedule ==
Date	Time	Opponent	Site	Result	Attendance	Source
September 19		Lynchburg*	Miles Field; Blacksburg, VA	W 10–0		
September 26		Roanoke*	Miles Field; Blacksburg, VA	T 0–0	4,500	
October 3	3:00 p.m.	Hampden–Sydney*	Miles Field; Blacksburg, VA	W 13–3		
October 10	2:30 p.m.	at Auburn	Drake Field; Auburn, AL	L 0–19	5,000	
October 17	2:30 p.m.	vs. Maryland	Griffith Stadium; Washington, DC	W 3–0		
October 24		vs. Washington and Lee	Lynchburg, VA	L 0–20		
October 31	2:30 p.m.	vs. South Carolina	Mayo Island Park; Richmond, VA	W 6–0		
November 7		NC State	Miles Field; Blacksburg, VA	T 0–0		
November 14		at Virginia	Lambeth Field; Charlottesville, VA (rivalry)	L 0–10		
November 26		vs. VMI	Maher Field; Roanoke, VA (rivalry)	W 7–0	14,000	
*Non-conference game; All times are in Eastern time

== Before the season ==
The 1924 VPI Gobblers football team compiled a 4–2–3 record and were led by B. C. Cubbage in his fourth season as head coach.

== Game summaries ==
=== Lynchburg ===
Lynchburg vs. VPI

Team	1	2	3	4	Total
Lynchburg	0	0	0	0	0
• VPI	7	3	0	0	10

- Date: September 19, 1925
- Location: Miles Field
  Blacksburg, VA
- Referee: Izard (W&L)

VPI's first game of the season was a victory over Lynchburg at Miles Field.

The starting lineup for VPI was: Holly (left end), Greene (left tackle), Handy (left guard), Moran (center), Ray (right guard), Miles (right tackle), Brigham (right end), Robertson (quarterback), Esleeck (left halfback), DeLaBarre (right halfback), Moss (fullback). The substitutes were: Adams, Anderson, Bird, Bond, Downing, Faulkner, Hargis, Jeffries, Lineberry, Von Erickson, Williams and Wray.

The starting lineup for Lynchburg was: Perry (left end), Robert Givens (left tackle), Frank Suttenfield (left guard), Ralph Shank (center), Allen (right guard), George West (right tackle), Grant (right end), James Barbee (quarterback), Harrison McMains (left halfback), Walter Thomas (right halfback), Max Leitman (fullback). The substitutes were: Carroll, Ross and Rowley.

=== Roanoke ===
Roanoke vs. VPI

Team	1	2	3	4	Total
Roanoke	0	0	0	0	0
VPI	0	0	0	0	0

- Date: September 26, 1925
- Location: Miles Field
  Blacksburg, VA
- Game attendance: 4,500
- Referee: Parrish (VPI)

After their victory over Lynchburg, VPI played Roanoke College at Miles Field.

The starting lineup for VPI was: Holly (left end), Greene (left tackle), Handy (left guard), Moran (center), Ray (right guard), Miles (right tackle), Brigham (right end), Robertson (quarterback), Faulkner (left halfback), DeLaBarre (right halfback), Moss (fullback). The substitutes were: Anderson.

The starting lineup for Roanoke was: Lloyd Seay (left end), Anthony Giesen (left tackle), C. C. Marsh (left guard), Fielding Logan (center), Maurice Givens (right guard), S. F. Davies (right tackle), Palmer Rutherford (right end), John Dietrich (quarterback), Carl Bissinger (left halfback), John Miller (right halfback), Alfred Hurt (fullback). The substitutes were: D. S. Ellicock, Raymond Haislip and Charles Wilson.

=== Hampden–Sydney ===
Hampden–Sydney vs. VPI

Team	1	2	3	4	Total
HS	3	0	0	0	3
• VPI	0	0	7	6	13

- Date: October 3, 1925
- Location: Miles Field
  Blacksburg, VA
- Game start: 3:00 p.m.
- Referee: Izard (W&L)

The starting lineup for VPI was: Holly (left end), Greene (left tackle), Handy (left guard), Moran (center), Ray (right guard), Miles (right tackle), Brigham (right end), Anderson (quarterback), Esleeck (left halfback), Robinson (right halfback), Faulkner (fullback). The substitutes were: Bird, Bond, DeLaBarre, Gaines, Hargis, Jeffries, Moss, Williams and Wray.

The starting lineup for Hampden–Sydney was: Charles Turley (left end), Stuart Worden (left tackle), Robert Nance (left guard), Alfred Dudley (center), Edwin Stover (right guard), Harry Myles (right tackle), Richard Roberts (right end), John Brinser (quarterback), Ward Palmer (left halfback), Jones (right halfback), Alvin Lyons (fullback). The substitutes were: Alexander, Alfred Adkins, Ayres, Gordon Clarke, Hudson, David Reveley, William Richardson and Zimmerman.

=== Auburn ===
VPI at Auburn

Team	1	2	3	4	Total
VPI	0	0	0	0	0
• Auburn	6	0	13	0	19

- Date: October 10, 1925
- Location: Drake Field
  Auburn, AL
- Game start: 2:30 p.m.
- Game attendance: 5,000
- Referee: Powell (Dartmouth)

The starting lineup for VPI was: Holly (left end), Greene (left tackle), Ray (left guard), Moran (center), Handy (right guard), Miles (right tackle), Brigham (right end), Anderson (quarterback), Esleeck (left halfback), DeLaBarre (right halfback), Moss (fullback).

The starting lineup for Auburn was: George Ollinger (left end), E. A. Pruett (left tackle), Long (left guard), J. E. Robinson (center), E. McFadden (right guard), Edward Harkins (right tackle), Buck Spinks (right end), E. E. Williams (quarterback), Frank Tuxworth (left halfback), Green (right halfback), Herman Salter (fullback). The substitutes were: F. Bogue, T. P. Crane, Finch, Johnson, J. W. Market and W. W. Patterson.

=== Maryland ===
Maryland vs. VPI

Team	1	2	3	4	Total
Maryland	0	0	0	0	0
• VPI	0	0	0	3	3

- Date: October 17, 1925
- Location: Griffith Stadium
  Washington, DC
- Game start: 2:30 p.m.
- Game weather: Heavy rain
- Referee: Paul Magoffin

The starting lineup for VPI was: Holly (left end), Greene (left tackle), Handy (left guard), Moran (center), Jeffries (right guard), Miles (right tackle), Brigham (right end), Robertson (quarterback), Moss (left halfback), Esleeck (right halfback), DeLaBarre (fullback). The substitutes were: Bond, Faulkner and Wray.

The starting lineup for Maryland was: Bill Supplee (left end), Walter Bromley (left tackle), Arthur Bonnet (left guard), Harold Bafford (center), John R. Lanigan (right guard), John Waters (right tackle), William Beatty (right end), Edward Tenney (quarterback), David Whelchel (left halfback), Lewis "Knocky" Thomas (right halfback), Fred Linkous (fullback). The substitutes were: Donald Adams, Kirkland Besley, Brown, Cardwell, Granger, Pugh, Edwin Rothgeb, Schaffer, Myron Stevens, Walter Troxell and Earl Zulick.

=== Washington and Lee ===
Washington & Lee vs. VPI

Team	1	2	3	4	Total
• W&L	0	14	0	6	20
VPI	0	0	0	0	0

- Date: October 24, 1925
- Location: Lynchburg, VA
- Referee: Paul Magoffin

The starting lineup for VPI was: Holly (left end), Greene (left tackle), Handy (left guard), Moran (center), Jeffries (right guard), Miles (right tackle), Brigham (right end), Robertson (quarterback), Esleeck (left halfback), DeLaBarre (right halfback), Moss (fullback). The substitutes were: Anderson, Bond, Petty and Von Erickson.

The starting lineup for Washington and Lee was: R. I. Daves (left end), Warren E. Tilson (left tackle), Leslie Stemmons (left guard), Archie Hawkins (center), Charlie Van Horn (right guard), Robert Holt (right tackle), James Kay Thomas (right end), Burnell Tips (quarterback), Henry Wilson (left halfback), William Palmer (right halfback), Ty Rauber (fullback). The substitutes were: Francis Barclay, Merrell Budnick and John McVay.

=== South Carolina ===
South Carolina vs. VPI

Team	1	2	3	4	Total
South Carolina	0	0	0	0	0
• VPI	0	0	6	0	6

- Date: October 31, 1925
- Location: Mayo Island Park
  Richmond, VA
- Game start: 2:30 p.m.
- Referee: Harry Hartsell

The starting lineup for VPI was: Holly (left end), Miles (left tackle), Jones (left guard), Moran (center), Handy (right guard), Greene (right tackle), Petty (right end), Robertson (quarterback), Esleeck (left halfback), DeLaBarre (right halfback), Moss (fullback). The substitutes were: Faulkner.

The starting lineup for South Carolina was: Samuel Burke (left end), J. C. Long (left tackle), Henry Bartelle (left guard), William Boyd (center), James Pruitt (right guard), Floyd Thomas (right tackle), William Swink (right end), William Jeffords (quarterback), W. H. Boatwright (left halfback), W. W. "Red" Swink (right halfback), Alexander Jaskewicz (fullback). The substitutes were: Bill Rogers and Robert Wimberley.

=== NC State ===
NC State vs. VPI

Team	1	2	3	4	Total
NC State	0	0	0	0	0
VPI	0	0	0	0	0

- Date: November 7, 1925
- Location: Miles Field
  Blacksburg, VA
- Referee: Jack Gass

The starting lineup for VPI was: Holly (left end), Greene (left tackle), Handy (left guard), Moran (center), Jones (right guard), Miles (right tackle), Brigham (right end), Robertson (quarterback), DeLaBarre (left halfback), Moss (right halfback), Faulkner (fullback). The substitutes were: Anderson, Bond, Esleeck, Jeffries, Petty and Williams.

The starting lineup for NC State was: William Beatty (left end), J. Kilgore (left tackle), William White (left guard), Fred Logan (center), Newlin Nicholson (right guard), B. R. Bynum (right tackle), Charles Austell (right end), Alfred Johnston (quarterback), G. E. Hunsucker (left halfback), Jack McDowall (right halfback), Walter Shuford (fullback). The substitutes were: William Donnell, Faulkner, Charles Lambe and Arthur Thomas.

=== Virginia ===
VPI at Virginia

Team	1	2	3	4	Total
VPI	0	0	0	0	0
• UVA	3	0	7	0	10

- Date: November 14, 1925
- Location: Lambeth Field
  Charlottesville, VA
- Referee: Izard (W&L)

The starting lineup for VPI was: Holly (left end), Greene (left tackle), Handy (left guard), Moran (center), Jones (right guard), Miles (right tackle), Brigham (right end), Robertson (quarterback), DeLaBarre (left halfback), Faulkner (right halfback), Esleeck (fullback). The substitutes were: Anderson, Bond, Jeffries, Moss and Petty.

The starting lineup for Virginia was: Arnold (left end), Mul Holland (left tackle), Ashley Cockrill (left guard), Theodore Phillips (center), Charles Mackall (right guard), Bickerton Cardwell (right tackle), William Branble (right end), A. Carter Diffey (quarterback), John Hushion (left halfback), Edmond Laird (right halfback), Quintis Hutter (fullback). The substitutes were: William Ahner, Curtis Cuddy, Dare, Samuel Friedburg, E. Robert Glauber and John Loth.

=== VMI ===
VMI vs. VPI

Team	1	2	3	4	Total
VMI	0	0	0	0	0
• VPI	0	7	0	0	7

- Date: November 26, 1925
- Location: Maher Field
  Roanoke, VA
- Game attendance: 14,000
- Referee: Ed Thorpe (De LaSalle)

The starting lineup for VPI was: Holly (left end), Greene (left tackle), Jones (left guard), Moran (center), Handy (right guard), Miles (right tackle), Brigham (right end), Anderson (quarterback), Bond (left halfback), Faulkner (right halfback), Moss (fullback). The substitutes were: DeLaBarre, Esleeck, Jeffries, Petty, Robertson and Williams.

The starting lineup for VMI was: John Fain (left end), Herman Kulp (left tackle), Karlyle O'Berry (left guard), Joseph Mondy (center), J. C. Smith (right guard), Claude Moorman (right tackle), Newton Barkley (right end), Paul Caldwell (quarterback), Oliver Gfroerer (left halfback), Archie Deitrich (right halfback), Windy White (fullback). The substitutes were: Karl Harmeling, Kelly, John Willis and Edward Yates.

== After the season ==
In December 1925, the VPI players elected Joseph Henry Moran as captain of the 1926 VPI Gobblers football team, the first time a VPI player has been chosen as captain in successive years.

== Players ==
VPI 1925 roster
J. C. Adams; George Claiborne "Speck" Anderson; Edward Arthur Bird; James Nurney Bond; Charles Wood Brigham; Cecil Franzen DeLaBarre; Barney Downing; Karl Esleeck; H. K. Faulkner; Edwin Ruthven Gaines; Arthur Greene; Edward Malvern Handy; William Leonard Hargis	Forrest William Holly; John Mercer Jeffries; J. B. Jones; H. H. Lineberry; Vernon Edward Miles; Joseph Henry Moran (Capt.); Jack Wellford Moss; Douglas Cooper Petty; James Edward Ray; Paul Robertson; R. Von Erickson; Williams; Wray

== Coaching and training staff ==
- Head coach: B. C. Cubbage
- Assistant coaches
  - Backfield coach: Charley Way
- Manager: James Peter King
- Freshman head coach: Henry Redd
- Freshman Manager: W. P. Wilkins
