= 1925 NC State Wolfpack football team =

American college football season

1925 NC State Wolfpack football
- Conference: Southern Conference
- Record: 3–5–1 (0–4–1 SoCon)
- Head coach: Gus Tebell (1st season)
- Home stadium: Riddick Stadium

1925 Southern Conference football standings
| | Conf. | | | | | Overall |
| Team | W | | L | | T | W | | L | | T |
|---|---|---|---|---|---|---|---|---|---|---|
| No. 2 Alabama + | 7 | – | 0 | – | 0 | 10 | – | 0 | – | 0 |
| No. 6 Tulane + | 5 | – | 0 | – | 0 | 9 | – | 0 | – | 1 |
| North Carolina | 4 | – | 0 | – | 1 | 7 | – | 1 | – | 1 |
| Washington and Lee | 5 | – | 1 | – | 0 | 5 | – | 5 | – | 0 |
| Virginia | 4 | – | 1 | – | 1 | 7 | – | 1 | – | 1 |
| Georgia Tech | 4 | – | 1 | – | 1 | 6 | – | 2 | – | 1 |
| Kentucky | 4 | – | 2 | – | 0 | 6 | – | 3 | – | 0 |
| Florida | 3 | – | 2 | – | 0 | 8 | – | 2 | – | 0 |
| Auburn | 3 | – | 2 | – | 1 | 5 | – | 3 | – | 1 |
| VPI | 3 | – | 3 | – | 1 | 5 | – | 3 | – | 2 |
| Vanderbilt | 3 | – | 3 | – | 0 | 6 | – | 3 | – | 0 |
| Tennessee | 2 | – | 2 | – | 1 | 5 | – | 2 | – | 1 |
| South Carolina | 2 | – | 2 | – | 0 | 7 | – | 3 | – | 0 |
| Georgia | 2 | – | 4 | – | 0 | 4 | – | 5 | – | 0 |
| Sewanee | 1 | – | 4 | – | 0 | 4 | – | 4 | – | 1 |
| Mississippi A&M | 1 | – | 4 | – | 0 | 3 | – | 4 | – | 1 |
| VMI | 1 | – | 5 | – | 0 | 5 | – | 5 | – | 0 |
| LSU | 0 | – | 2 | – | 1 | 5 | – | 3 | – | 1 |
| NC State | 0 | – | 4 | – | 1 | 3 | – | 5 | – | 1 |
| Ole Miss | 0 | – | 4 | – | 0 | 5 | – | 5 | – | 0 |
| Clemson | 0 | – | 4 | – | 0 | 1 | – | 7 | – | 0 |
| Maryland | 0 | – | 4 | – | 0 | 2 | – | 5 | – | 1 |
+ – Conference co-champions; Rankings from Dickinson System

The 1925 NC State Wolfpack football team was an American football team that represented North Carolina State University as a member of the Southern Conference during the 1925 season. In its first season under head coach Gus Tebell, NC State compiled a 3–5–1 record (0–4–1 against conference opponent), finished in 19th place in the conference, and was outscored by a total of 72 to 51. The team played its home games at Riddick Stadium in Raleigh, North Carolina.

== Schedule ==
| Date | Opponent | Site | Result | Source |
|---|---|---|---|---|
| September 25 | Richmond* | Riddick Stadium; Raleigh, NC | W 20–0 | |
| October 3 | at Duke* | Hanes Field; Durham, NC (rivalry) | W 13–0 | |
| October 10 | South Carolina | Riddick Stadium; Raleigh, NC (rivalry) | L 6–7 | |
| October 15 | North Carolina | Riddick Stadium; Raleigh, NC (rivalry) | L 0–17 | |
| October 24 | at VMI | Mayo Island Field; Richmond, VA | L 6–27 | |
| October 31 | at Davidson* | Richardson Field; Davidson, NC | L 0–9 | |
| November 7 | at VPI | Miles Field; Blacksburg, VA | T 0–0 | |
| November 14 | Wake Forest* | Riddick Stadium; Raleigh, NC (rivalry) | W 6–0 | |
| November 21 | at Washington and Lee | Wilson Field; Lexington, VA | L 0–12 | |
*Non-conference game
