= 1925 North Carolina Tar Heels football team =

American college football season

1925 North Carolina Tar Heels football
- Conference: Southern Conference
- Record: 7–1–1 (4–0–1 SoCon)
- Head coach: Bill Fetzer (5th season)
- Captain: Herman McIver
- Home stadium: Emerson Field

1925 Southern Conference football standings
	Conf.					Overall
Team	W		L		T	W		L		T
No. 2 Alabama +	7	–	0	–	0	10	–	0	–	0
No. 6 Tulane +	5	–	0	–	0	9	–	0	–	1
North Carolina	4	–	0	–	1	7	–	1	–	1
Washington and Lee	5	–	1	–	0	5	–	5	–	0
Virginia	4	–	1	–	1	7	–	1	–	1
Georgia Tech	4	–	1	–	1	6	–	2	–	1
Kentucky	4	–	2	–	0	6	–	3	–	0
Florida	3	–	2	–	0	8	–	2	–	0
Auburn	3	–	2	–	1	5	–	3	–	1
VPI	3	–	3	–	1	5	–	3	–	2
Vanderbilt	3	–	3	–	0	6	–	3	–	0
Tennessee	2	–	2	–	1	5	–	2	–	1
South Carolina	2	–	2	–	0	7	–	3	–	0
Georgia	2	–	4	–	0	4	–	5	–	0
Sewanee	1	–	4	–	0	4	–	4	–	1
Mississippi A&M	1	–	4	–	0	3	–	4	–	1
VMI	1	–	5	–	0	5	–	5	–	0
LSU	0	–	2	–	1	5	–	3	–	1
NC State	0	–	4	–	1	3	–	5	–	1
Ole Miss	0	–	4	–	0	5	–	5	–	0
Clemson	0	–	4	–	0	1	–	7	–	0
Maryland	0	–	4	–	0	2	–	5	–	1
+ – Conference co-champions; Rankings from Dickinson System

The 1925 North Carolina Tar Heels football team was an American football team that represented the University of North Carolina as a member of the Southern Conference during the 1925 season. North Carolina compiled a 7–1–1 record (4–0–1 against conference opponents, finished third in the conference, shut out six of nine opponents, and outscored all opponents by a total of 123 to 20. The team played its home games at Emerson Field in Chapel Hill, North Carolina.

Bill Fetzer was the team's head coach, and his brother Bob Fetzer was the school's athletic director. In January 1926, Bill Fetzer resigned as head coach to pursue more lucrative opportunities in the real estate business.

== Schedule ==
Date	Time	Opponent	Site	Result	Attendance	Source
September 26	3:00 p.m.	Wake Forest*	Emerson Field; Chapel Hill, NC (rivalry)	L 0–6	7,000	
October 3		at South Carolina	University Field; Columbia, SC (rivalry)	W 7–0		
October 10	3:00 p.m.	at Duke*	Hanes Field; Durham, NC (rivalry)	W 41–0	6,500	
October 15	2:30 p.m.	at NC State	Riddick Field; Raleigh, NC (rivalry)	W 17–0	12,000	
October 24	3:00 p.m.	at Mercer*	Centennial Stadium; Macon, GA	W 3–0		
October 31		vs. Maryland	Municipal Stadium; Baltimore, MD	W 16–0		
November 7	2:35 p.m.	vs. VMI	Mayo Island Park; Richmond, VA	W 23–11	8,000	
November 14	2:30 p.m.	Davidson*	Emerson Field; Chapel Hill, NC	W 13–0		
November 26	2:00 p.m.	Virginia	Emerson Field; Chapel Hill, NC (South's Oldest Rivalry)	T 3–3	15,000	
*Non-conference game; All times are in Eastern time
