= 1925 Washington and Lee Generals football team =

American college football season

1925 Washington and Lee Generals football
- Conference: Southern Conference
- Record: 5–5 (5–1 SoCon)
- Head coach: Jimmy DeHart (4th season)
- Captain: James Kay Thomas
- Home stadium: Wilson Field

1925 Southern Conference football standings
	Conf.					Overall
Team	W		L		T	W		L		T
No. 2 Alabama +	7	–	0	–	0	10	–	0	–	0
No. 6 Tulane +	5	–	0	–	0	9	–	0	–	1
North Carolina	4	–	0	–	1	7	–	1	–	1
Washington and Lee	5	–	1	–	0	5	–	5	–	0
Virginia	4	–	1	–	1	7	–	1	–	1
Georgia Tech	4	–	1	–	1	6	–	2	–	1
Kentucky	4	–	2	–	0	6	–	3	–	0
Florida	3	–	2	–	0	8	–	2	–	0
Auburn	3	–	2	–	1	5	–	3	–	1
VPI	3	–	3	–	1	5	–	3	–	2
Vanderbilt	3	–	3	–	0	6	–	3	–	0
Tennessee	2	–	2	–	1	5	–	2	–	1
South Carolina	2	–	2	–	0	7	–	3	–	0
Georgia	2	–	4	–	0	4	–	5	–	0
Sewanee	1	–	4	–	0	4	–	4	–	1
Mississippi A&M	1	–	4	–	0	3	–	4	–	1
VMI	1	–	5	–	0	5	–	5	–	0
LSU	0	–	2	–	1	5	–	3	–	1
NC State	0	–	4	–	1	3	–	5	–	1
Ole Miss	0	–	4	–	0	5	–	5	–	0
Clemson	0	–	4	–	0	1	–	7	–	0
Maryland	0	–	4	–	0	2	–	5	–	1
+ – Conference co-champions; Rankings from Dickinson System

The 1925 Washington and Lee Generals football team was an American football team that represented Washington and Lee University as a member of the Southern Conference during the 1925 football season. In its fourth and final season under head coach Jimmy DeHart, Washington and Lee compiled a 5–5 record (5–1 against conference opponents), finished in fourth place in the conference, and outscored opponents by a total of 111 to 104.

Washington and Lee's team captain James Kay Thomas was selected as a first-team end on the All-Southern team compiled by the Associated Press.

== Schedule ==
Date	Opponent	Site	Result	Attendance	Source
September 26	at Pittsburgh*	Pitt Stadium; Pittsburgh, PA	L 0–28	20,000	
October 3	Furman*	Wilson Field; Lexington, VA	L 15–20		
October 10	at Princeton*	Palmer Stadium; Princeton, NJ	L 6–15	8,000	
October 17	at Kentucky	Stoll Field; Lexington, KY	W 25–0		
October 24	vs. VPI	Lynchburg, VA	W 20–0		
October 31	at West Virginia*	Charleston, WV	L 0–21		
November 7	Virginia	Wilson Field; Lexington, VA	W 12–0		
November 14	at Maryland	Old Byrd Stadium; College Park, MD	W 7–3		
November 21	NC State	Wilson Field; Lexington, VA	W 12–0		
November 26	at Florida	Barrs Field; Jacksonville, FL	L 14–17	15,000	
*Non-conference game
