= 1925 Tulane Green Wave football team =

American college football season

1925 Tulane Green Wave football
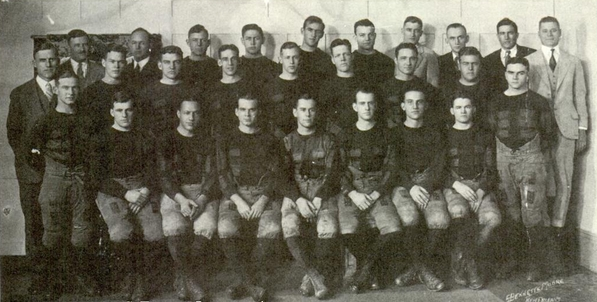

SoCon co-champion
- Conference: Southern Conference
- Record: 9–0–1 (5–0 SoCon)
- Head coach: Clark Shaughnessy (10th season)
- Offensive scheme: Single wing
- Captain: Lester Lautenschlaeger
- Home stadium: Second Tulane Stadium

Uniform
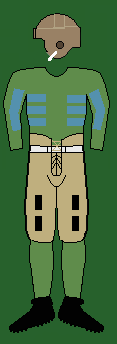

1925 Southern Conference football standings
	Conf.					Overall
Team	W		L		T	W		L		T
No. 2 Alabama +	7	–	0	–	0	10	–	0	–	0
No. 6 Tulane +	5	–	0	–	0	9	–	0	–	1
North Carolina	4	–	0	–	1	7	–	1	–	1
Washington and Lee	5	–	1	–	0	5	–	5	–	0
Virginia	4	–	1	–	1	7	–	1	–	1
Georgia Tech	4	–	1	–	1	6	–	2	–	1
Kentucky	4	–	2	–	0	6	–	3	–	0
Florida	3	–	2	–	0	8	–	2	–	0
Auburn	3	–	2	–	1	5	–	3	–	1
VPI	3	–	3	–	1	5	–	3	–	2
Vanderbilt	3	–	3	–	0	6	–	3	–	0
Tennessee	2	–	2	–	1	5	–	2	–	1
South Carolina	2	–	2	–	0	7	–	3	–	0
Georgia	2	–	4	–	0	4	–	5	–	0
Sewanee	1	–	4	–	0	4	–	4	–	1
Mississippi A&M	1	–	4	–	0	3	–	4	–	1
VMI	1	–	5	–	0	5	–	5	–	0
LSU	0	–	2	–	1	5	–	3	–	1
NC State	0	–	4	–	1	3	–	5	–	1
Ole Miss	0	–	4	–	0	5	–	5	–	0
Clemson	0	–	4	–	0	1	–	7	–	0
Maryland	0	–	4	–	0	2	–	5	–	1
+ – Conference co-champions; Rankings from Dickinson System

The 1925 Tulane Green Wave football team was an American football team that represented Tulane University as a member of the Southern Conference (SoCon) during the 1925 Southern Conference football season. In its tenth year under head coach Clark Shaughnessy, Tulane compiled a 9–0–1 record (5–0 in conference games), tied for the SoCon championship, shut out five opponents, and outscored all opponents by a total of 246 to 32. The team's only setback was a tie with Missouri Valley champion Missouri.

For the second year in a row, Tulane set a school record for wins in a season. Most notable was the defeat of Northwestern, a game which helped herald the arrival of Southern football. Tulane was ranked No. 6 nationally in the Dickinson System ratings released in January 1926.

Peggy Flournoy was the nation's leading scorer with 128 points.

== Before the season ==
Coach Shaughnessy never had such a wealth of material as 1925. The backfield included captain and Hall of Fame quarterback Lester Lautenschlaeger and halfback Peggy Flournoy. Though he was famous for later using the T formation, at Tulane coach Shaughnessy employed the single wing. Assistant Bierman left for the Mississippi A&M job.

1925 saw the south's widespread use of the forward pass.

== Schedule ==
Date	Time	Opponent	Site	Result	Attendance	Source
September 26	2:30 p. m.	Louisiana College*	Tulane Stadium; New Orleans, LA	W 77–0	4,500	
October 3	2:30 p. m.	Missouri*	Tulane Stadium; New Orleans, LA	T 6–6	8,500	
October 10	2:30 p. m.	Ole Miss	Tulane Stadium; New Orleans, LA (rivalry)	W 26–7		
October 17		Mississippi A&M	Tulane Stadium; New Orleans, LA	W 25–3		
October 24		at Northwestern*	Stagg Field; Chicago, IL	W 18–7	15,000	
October 31		at Auburn	Cramton Bowl; Montgomery, AL (rivalry)	W 13–0	8,000	
November 7		Louisiana Tech*	Tulane Stadium; New Orleans, LA	W 37–0		
November 14		Sewanee	Tulane Stadium; New Orleans, LA	W 14–0	15,000	
November 21		at LSU	Tiger Stadium; Baton Rouge, LA (rivalry)	W 16–0	21,000	
November 26		at Centenary*	Centenary Field; Shreveport, LA	W 14–0	10,000	
*Non-conference game

== Game summaries ==
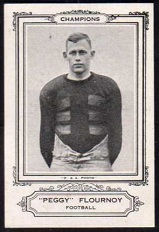
Flournoy

=== Louisiana College ===
Louisiana College at Tulane

Team	1	2	3	4	Total
Louisiana	0	0	0	0	0
• Tulane	20	6	25	26	77

- Date: September 26
- Location: New Orleans, LA
- Game start: 2:30 p. m.
- Game attendance: 4,500

The season opened on a wet, sloppy field. Tulane beat Louisiana College of Pineville 77–0. Coach Shaughnessy only allowed his regulars to play half of the game. Lester Lautenschlaeger was probably the star of the game.

=== Missouri ===
Missouri at Tulane

Team	1	2	3	4	Total
Missouri	6	0	0	0	6
Tulane	0	6	0	0	6

- Date: October 3
- Location: New Orleans, LA
- Game start: 2:30 p. m.
- Game attendance: 8,500

The only blemish on the year was a 6–6 tie to Missouri. Missouri scored on a 30-yard pass. Peggy Flournoy plunged over for the tying touchdown.

The starting lineup was Gamble (left end), Wight (left tackle), Levy (left guard), H. Wilson (center), Blackledge (right guard), Talbot (right tackle), Brown (right end), Lautenschlaeger (quarterback), Morgan (left halfback), Flournoy (right halfback), Norman (fullback).

=== Ole Miss ===
Ole Miss at Tulane

Team	1	2	3	4	Total
Miss.	0	0	0	7	7
• Tulane	13	7	0	6	26

- Date: October 10
- Location: New Orleans, LA
- Game start: 2:30 p. m.

The Green Wave used the forward pass to beat coach Homer Hazel's Ole Miss Rebels 26–7.

The starting lineup was Gamble (left end), Wight (left tackle), Levy (left guard), H. Wilson (center), Blackledge (right guard), Talbot (right tackle), G. Wilson (right end), Lautenschlaeger (quarterback), Morgan (left halfback), Flournoy (right halfback), Lamprecht (fullback).

=== Mississippi A&M ===
Mississippi A&M at Tulane

Team	1	2	3	4	Total
Miss. A&M	3	0	0	0	3
• Tulane	0	6	13	6	25

- Date: October 17
- Location: New Orleans, LA

Former assistant Bernie Bierman's Mississippi Aggies took the lead 3–0 in the opening quarter with a drop kick. Harry P. Gamble blocked a couple of kicks and Tulane came back to win 25–3. After the defeat of the Aggies, some Tulane supporters felt the Wave would defeat Alabama.

The starting lineup was Gamble (left end), Wight (left tackle), Levy (left guard), H. Wilson (center), Blackledge (right guard), P. Brown (right tackle), D. Wilson (right end), Lautenschlaeger (quarterback), Flournoy (left halfback), Morgan (right halfback), Lamprecht (fullback).

=== Northwestern ===
Tulane at Northwestern

Team	1	2	3	4	Total
• Tulane	6	6	6	0	18
Northwestern	0	7	0	0	7

- Date: November 14
- Location: Stagg Field
  Chicago, IL

In the 18–7 triumph over Northwestern, Flournoy scored three touchdowns and skied his punts. Northwestern's score came in the second period.

The starting lineup was Gamble (left end), Wight (left tackle), Levy (left guard), H. Wilson (center), Blackledge (right guard), Talbot (right tackle), Wilson (right end), Lautenschlaeger (quarterback), Flournoy (left halfback), Morgan (right halfback), Lamprecht (fullback).

=== Auburn ===
Auburn at Tulane

Team	1	2	3	4	Total
Auburn	0	0	0	0	0
• Tulane	0	0	7	6	13

- Date: October 30
- Location: Montgomery, Alabama

On a field thick with muddy, Alabama clay in Montgomery, the Green Wave won over the Auburn Tigers 13–0, scoring all points in the second half.

=== Louisiana Tech ===
Flournoy scored 31 of Tulane's 37 points in the win over Louisiana Polytechnic despite Tulane using mostly reserves.

The starting lineup was Gamble (left end), Browne (left tackle), Levy (left guard), H. Wilson (center), Blackledge (right guard), Wight (right tackle), D. Wilson (right end), Lautenschlaeger (quarterback), Menville (left halfback), Flournoy (right halfback), Lamprecht (fullback).

=== Sewanee ===
Sewanee at Tulane

Team	1	2	3	4	Total
Sewanee	0	0	0	0	0
• Tulane	0	0	14	0	14

- Date: November 14
- Location: New Orleans, LA
- Game attendance: 15,000

Tulane defeated the Sewanee Tigers 14–0. All scores took place in the third quarter. A 32-yard pass from Lautenschlaeger to Brown set up the first score. On the second, Flournoy got loose for a 68-yard run off tackle.

=== LSU ===
Tulane at LSU

Team	1	2	3	4	Total
• Tulane	0	0	7	9	16
LSU	0	0	0	0	0

- Date: November 21
- Location: Baton Rouge, LA
- Game attendance: 21,000
- Referee: Ed Finlay

After a scoreless first half, Tulane beat the rival LSU Tigers by a 16–0 score. A pass from Lautenschlaeger to Menville got the first touchdown. The final points were scored by Irish Levy dropping the LSU quarterback for a safety.

=== Centenary ===
Something of an anticlimax after the LSU game, Tulane beat Centenary 14–0 to cap an undefeated season.

== Postseason ==
Tulane shared the SoCon title with Wallace Wade's Alabama Crimson Tide, which went on to win the Rose Bowl. Tulane's administration declined a Rose Bowl invitation, in order to keep their student-athletes in class.

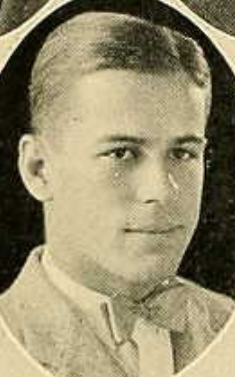
Lester Lautenschlaeger

One account reads "In the South they call "Peggy" Flournoy of Tulane University, the greatest all-round gridder in that section." Flournoy led the nation in scoring in scoring with 128 points, and was awarded the Most Valuable Player (MVP) award by the Veteran Athletic's Association. He was selected by Billy Evans and Norman E. Brown as a first-team halfback on their 1925 College Football All-America Teams. He was also named a second-team All-American by the Associated Press and the All-America Board. Flournoy and Irish Levy were All-Southern. Levy was never taken out of a game for an injury during his playing career. Lautenschlaeger made Billy Evans' Southern Honor Roll.

Flournoy's school record of 128 points was not broken until 2007 by Matt Forte.

== Personnel ==
=== Depth chart ===
The following chart provides a visual depiction of Tulane's lineup during the 1925 season with games started at the position reflected in parentheses. The chart mimics a single wing on offense.

LE Harry Gamble (5)	LG Irish Levy (5)	C Harvey Wilson (5)	RG Roy Blackledge (5)	LT Benny Wight (4) Pat Brown (1)	RT Hoss Talbot (3) Pat Brown (1) Benny Wight (1)	RE Doc Wilson (5)
				QB Lester Lautenschlaeger (5)			RHB Eddie Morgan (3) Peggy Flournoy (2)
			FB George Lamprecht (4) David Norman (1)
	LHB Peggy Flournoy (2) Eddie Morgan (2) Johnny Menville (1)

=== Line ===
Number	Player	Position	Games started	Hometown	Prep school	Height	Weight	Age
27	Roy Blackledge	guard						
12	Pat Browne	tackle			Spring Hill College			
7	Harry P. Gamble	end		New Orleans	Warren Easton High		165	21
23	Irish Levy	guard		New Orleans				21
19	Virgil Robinson	guard						
22	Hoss Talbot	tackle						
31	Benny Wight	tackle						
6	Doc Wilson	end						
24	Harvey Wilson	end						

=== Backfield ===
Number	Player	Position	Games started	Hometown	Prep school	Height	Weight	Age
15	Peggy Flournoy	halfback			Rugby Academy	6'1"	165	21
11	Ellis Henican	back		New Orleans				
1	Lester Lautenschlaeger	quarterback		New Orleans				
10	Fred Lamprecht	fullback						
3	Cajin Lorio	back						
21	Johnny Menville	halfback		New Orleans	Jesuit High			
17	Eddie Morgan	halfback						
25	David Norman	fullback						

=== Unlisted ===
Number	Player	Position	Games started	Hometown	Prep school	Height	Weight	Age
2	Thomas Killeen							
5	Walter Moss							
13	Alfred Stoessel							
14	Earl Evans							
16	Reginald Watson							
18	Bill Duren							
26	Rosenhouse							
28	Carre							
32	Pascal Palermo							

== Bibliography ==
- Jambalaya. 1926.
- Woodruff, Fuzzy (1928). A History of Southern Football 1890–1928. Vol. 3.
