= 1925 Virginia Cavaliers football team =

American college football season

1925 Virginia Cavaliers football
- Conference: Southern Conference
- Record: 7–1–1 (4–1–1 SoCon)
- Head coach: Greasy Neale (3rd season)
- Captain: Carter Diffey
- Home stadium: Lambeth Field

1925 Southern Conference football standings
	Conf.					Overall
Team	W		L		T	W		L		T
No. 2 Alabama +	7	–	0	–	0	10	–	0	–	0
No. 6 Tulane +	5	–	0	–	0	9	–	0	–	1
North Carolina	4	–	0	–	1	7	–	1	–	1
Washington and Lee	5	–	1	–	0	5	–	5	–	0
Virginia	4	–	1	–	1	7	–	1	–	1
Georgia Tech	4	–	1	–	1	6	–	2	–	1
Kentucky	4	–	2	–	0	6	–	3	–	0
Florida	3	–	2	–	0	8	–	2	–	0
Auburn	3	–	2	–	1	5	–	3	–	1
VPI	3	–	3	–	1	5	–	3	–	2
Vanderbilt	3	–	3	–	0	6	–	3	–	0
Tennessee	2	–	2	–	1	5	–	2	–	1
South Carolina	2	–	2	–	0	7	–	3	–	0
Georgia	2	–	4	–	0	4	–	5	–	0
Sewanee	1	–	4	–	0	4	–	4	–	1
Mississippi A&M	1	–	4	–	0	3	–	4	–	1
VMI	1	–	5	–	0	5	–	5	–	0
LSU	0	–	2	–	1	5	–	3	–	1
NC State	0	–	4	–	1	3	–	5	–	1
Ole Miss	0	–	4	–	0	5	–	5	–	0
Clemson	0	–	4	–	0	1	–	7	–	0
Maryland	0	–	4	–	0	2	–	5	–	1
+ – Conference co-champions; Rankings from Dickinson System

The 1925 Virginia Cavaliers football team was an American football team that represented the University of Virginia as a member of the Southern Conference during the 1925 season. In its third season under head coach Greasy Neale, Virginia compiled a 7–1–1 record (4–1–1 against conference opponents) and outscored opponents by a total of 144 to 31. The team played its home games at Lambeth Field in Charlottesville, Virginia.

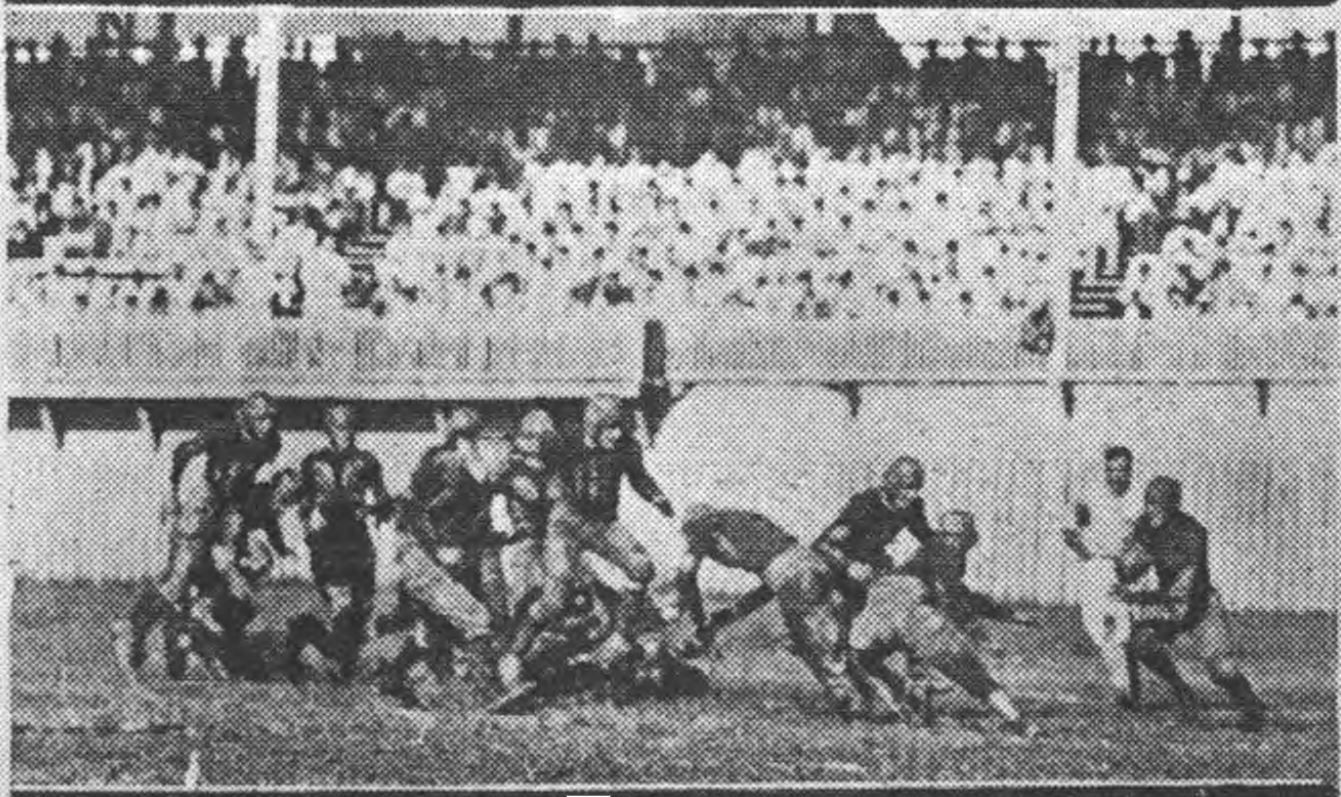
The Georgia game at Sanford Field

== Schedule ==
Date	Opponent	Site	Result	Attendance	Source
September 26	Hampden–Sydney*	Lambeth Field; Charlottesville, VA	W 40–0		
October 3	at Georgia	Sanford Field; Athens, GA	W 7–6		
October 10	Richmond*	Lambeth Field; Charlottesville, VA	W 19–0		
October 17	VMI	Lambeth Field; Charlottesville, VA	W 18–10		
October 24	Maryland	Lambeth Field; Charlottesville, VA	W 6–0		
November 7	at Washington and Lee	Wilson Field; Lexington, VA	L 0–12		
November 14	VPI^{†}	Lambeth Field; Charlottesville, VA (rivalry)	W 10–0		
November 17	Randolph–Macon*	Lambeth Field; Charlottesville, VA	W 41–0		
November 26	at North Carolina	Emerson Field; Chapel Hill, NC (rivalry)	T 3–3	> 18,000	
*Non-conference game; ^{†}Homecoming
