= 1925 Ole Miss Rebels football team =

American college football season

1925 Ole Miss Rebels football
- Conference: Southern Conference
- Record: 5–5 (0–4 SoCon)
- Head coach: Homer Hazel (1st season)
- Home stadium: Hemingway Stadium

1925 Southern Conference football standings
	Conf.					Overall
Team	W		L		T	W		L		T
No. 2 Alabama +	7	–	0	–	0	10	–	0	–	0
No. 6 Tulane +	5	–	0	–	0	9	–	0	–	1
North Carolina	4	–	0	–	1	7	–	1	–	1
Washington and Lee	5	–	1	–	0	5	–	5	–	0
Virginia	4	–	1	–	1	7	–	1	–	1
Georgia Tech	4	–	1	–	1	6	–	2	–	1
Kentucky	4	–	2	–	0	6	–	3	–	0
Florida	3	–	2	–	0	8	–	2	–	0
Auburn	3	–	2	–	1	5	–	3	–	1
VPI	3	–	3	–	1	5	–	3	–	2
Vanderbilt	3	–	3	–	0	6	–	3	–	0
Tennessee	2	–	2	–	1	5	–	2	–	1
South Carolina	2	–	2	–	0	7	–	3	–	0
Georgia	2	–	4	–	0	4	–	5	–	0
Sewanee	1	–	4	–	0	4	–	4	–	1
Mississippi A&M	1	–	4	–	0	3	–	4	–	1
VMI	1	–	5	–	0	5	–	5	–	0
LSU	0	–	2	–	1	5	–	3	–	1
NC State	0	–	4	–	1	3	–	5	–	1
Ole Miss	0	–	4	–	0	5	–	5	–	0
Clemson	0	–	4	–	0	1	–	7	–	0
Maryland	0	–	4	–	0	2	–	5	–	1
+ – Conference co-champions; Rankings from Dickinson System

The 1925 Ole Miss Rebels football team was an American football team that represented the University of Mississippi as a member of the Southern Conference during its 1925 season. The team compiled a 5–5 record (0–4 against conference opponents), tied for last place in the conference, and outscored opponents by a total of 147 to 87. In February 1925, Homer Hazel signed to become the head football coach at Ole Miss.

Four Ole Miss players were selected by the Daily Clarion-Ledger as first-team players on its 1925 All-Mississippi football team: Mitchell Salloum at left tackle; V. K. Smith at left guard; Ap Applewhite at right end; and Sollie Cohen at fullback. Quarterback Dick Cook and left halfback Van Martin were named to the second team. Other key players included Webb Burke at center.

== Schedule ==
Date	Opponent	Site	Result	Attendance	Source
September 26	Jonesboro A&M*	Hemingway Stadium; Oxford, MS	W 53–0		
October 3	at Texas*	Memorial Stadium; Austin, TX	L 0–25		
October 10	at Tulane	Tulane Stadium; New Orleans, LA (rivalry)	L 7–26		
October 17	Union (TN)*	Hemingway Stadium; Oxford, MS	W 7–6		
October 24	vs. Mississippi A&M	Jackson, MS (rivalry)	L 0–6	10,000	
October 31	at Vanderbilt	Dudley Field; Nashville, TN (rivalry)	L 0–7		
November 7	at Sewanee	Chamberlain Field; Chattanooga, TN	L 9–10		
November 14	at Mississippi College*	Provine Field; Clinton, MS	W 19–7		
November 21	Southwestern Presbyterian*^{†}	Hemingway Stadium; Oxford, MS	W 31–0		
November 26	at Millsaps*	Jackson, MS	W 21–0	3,500	
*Non-conference game; ^{†}Homecoming
