= 1925 Roanoke Maroons football team =

American college football season

1925 Roanoke Maroons football
- Conference: Virginia–North Carolina Intercollegiate Athletic Conference
- Record: 5–2–2 (5–1 V–NCIAC)
- Head coach: Pinky Spruhan (12th season)
- Home stadium: College Field; Maher Field

The 1925 Roanoke Maroons football team represented Roanoke College as a member of the Virginia–North Carolina Intercollegiate Athletic Conference (V–NCIAC) during the 1925 college football season. Led by 12th-year head coach Pinky Spruhan, the Maroons compiled an overall record of 5–2–2, with a mark of 5–1 in conference play.

== Schedule ==
Date	Opponent	Site	Result	Attendance	Source
September 26	at VPI*	Miles Field; Blacksburg, VA	T 0–0	4,500	
October 3	Randolph–Macon	College Field; Salem, VA	W 30–0		
October 10	at VMI*	Alumni Field; Lexington, VA	L 14–17		
October 24	at Hampden–Sydney	Hampden-Sydney, VA	W 6–0		
October 31	Lenoir–Rhyne	College Field; Salem, VA	W 13–0		
November 7	Richmond	Maher Field; Roanoke, VA	W 6–0		
November 14	Gettysburg*	Maher Field; Roanoke, VA	T 0–0		
November 21	William & Mary	Mahar Field; Roanoke, VA	L 0–23		
November 28	at Lynchburg	Municipal Stadium; Lynchburg, VA	W 9–6		
*Non-conference game
