= 1925 Florida Gators football team =

American college football season

1925 Florida Gators football
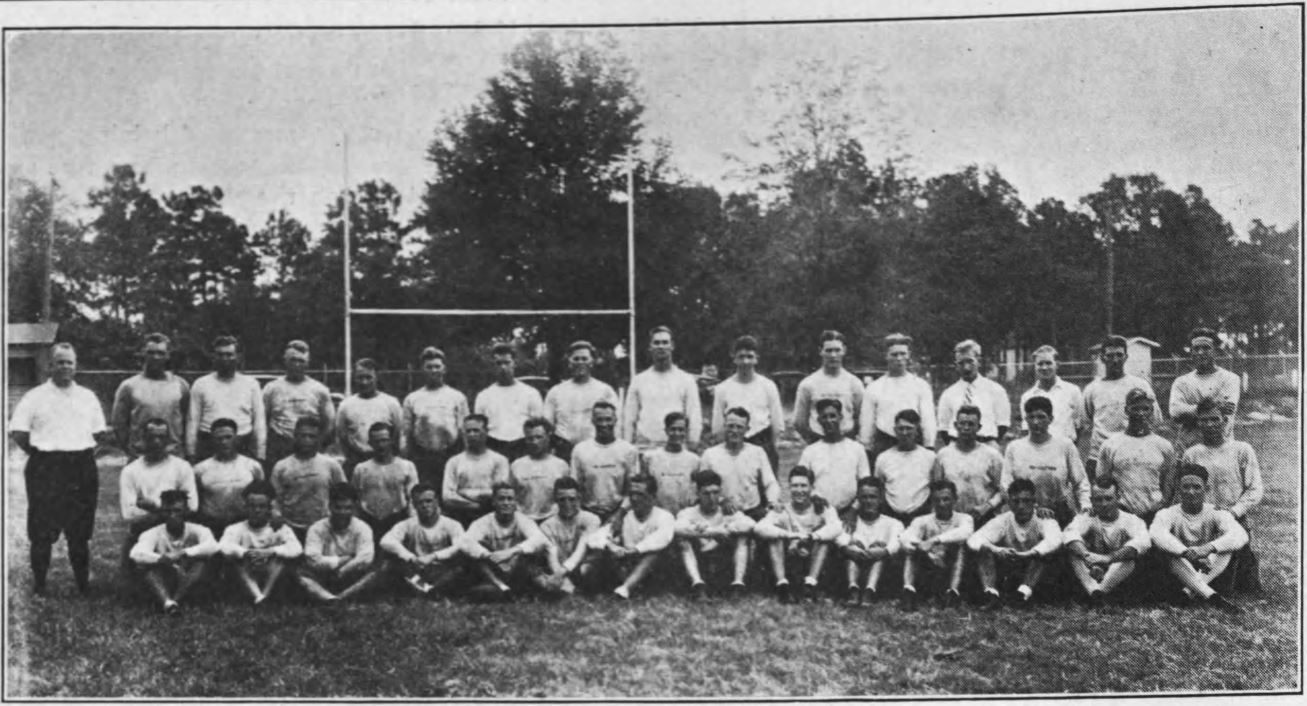
- Conference: Southern Conference
- Record: 8–2 (3–2 SoCon)
- Head coach: Harold Sebring (1st season)
- Offensive scheme: Notre Dame Box
- Captain: Edgar C. Jones
- Home stadium: Fleming Field

Uniform
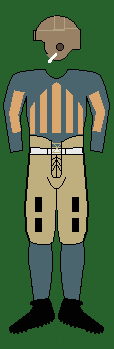

1925 Southern Conference football standings
	Conf.					Overall
Team	W		L		T	W		L		T
No. 2 Alabama +	7	–	0	–	0	10	–	0	–	0
No. 6 Tulane +	5	–	0	–	0	9	–	0	–	1
North Carolina	4	–	0	–	1	7	–	1	–	1
Washington and Lee	5	–	1	–	0	5	–	5	–	0
Virginia	4	–	1	–	1	7	–	1	–	1
Georgia Tech	4	–	1	–	1	6	–	2	–	1
Kentucky	4	–	2	–	0	6	–	3	–	0
Florida	3	–	2	–	0	8	–	2	–	0
Auburn	3	–	2	–	1	5	–	3	–	1
VPI	3	–	3	–	1	5	–	3	–	2
Vanderbilt	3	–	3	–	0	6	–	3	–	0
Tennessee	2	–	2	–	1	5	–	2	–	1
South Carolina	2	–	2	–	0	7	–	3	–	0
Georgia	2	–	4	–	0	4	–	5	–	0
Sewanee	1	–	4	–	0	4	–	4	–	1
Mississippi A&M	1	–	4	–	0	3	–	4	–	1
VMI	1	–	5	–	0	5	–	5	–	0
LSU	0	–	2	–	1	5	–	3	–	1
NC State	0	–	4	–	1	3	–	5	–	1
Ole Miss	0	–	4	–	0	5	–	5	–	0
Clemson	0	–	4	–	0	1	–	7	–	0
Maryland	0	–	4	–	0	2	–	5	–	1
+ – Conference co-champions; Rankings from Dickinson System

The 1925 Florida Gators football team represented the University of Florida during the 1925 Southern Conference football season. This was law student Harold Sebring's first of three seasons as the head coach of the Florida Gators football team. Sebring's 1925 Florida Gators finished 8–2 overall, and 3–2 in the Southern Conference, placing eighth of twenty-two teams in the conference standings.

The Gators compiled their best win–loss record to date, losing only to the Georgia Tech Yellow Jackets 7–23 in Atlanta, Georgia and coach Wallace Wade's undefeated Alabama Crimson Tide 0–34 in Montgomery, Alabama. The highlights of the season included conference victories over the Wake Forest Demon Deacons, Clemson Tigers, Mississippi A&M Aggies and Washington & Lee Generals.

Captain and halfback Edgar C. Jones set a Florida single-season scoring record (108 points) that lasted until 1969.

== Before the season ==
Practice began on September 14. Coaches Tom Sebring, A. C. Tipton, Everett Yon, and Herb Bunker were in charge of the first workout. Though he graduated, Clyde Norton was eligible to return. Despite losing eight players, prospects were bright. 1925 saw the south's widespread use of the forward pass. As coach Sebring recalled, quarterback Edgar C. Jones "held back from calling plays for himself the year before. I told him not to hold back."

== Schedule ==
Date	Opponent	Site	Result	Attendance	Source
October 3	Mercer*	Fleming Field; Gainesville, FL	W 24–0	8,000	
October 10	Southern College*	Fleming Field; Gainesville FL	W 9–0		
October 10	Hampden–Sydney*	Fleming Field; Gainesville, FL	W 22–6		
October 17	at Georgia Tech	Grant Field; Atlanta, GA	L 7–23		
October 24	Wake Forest*^{†}	Fleming Field; Gainesville, FL	W 24–3		
October 31	Rollins*	Fleming Field; Gainesville, FL	W 61–0		
November 7	at Clemson	Riggs Field; Clemson, SC	W 42–0		
November 14	at Alabama	Cramton Bowl; Montgomery, AL (rivalry)	L 0–34		
November 21	vs. Mississippi A&M	Plant Field; Tampa, FL	W 12–0	12,000	
November 26	vs. Washington & Lee	Barrs Field; Jacksonville, FL	W 17–14	15,000	
*Non-conference game; ^{†}Homecoming

== Game summaries ==
=== Week 1: Mercer ===
Week 1: Mercer at Florida

Team	1	2	3	4	Total
Mercer	0	0	0	0	0
• Florida	7	0	10	7	24

- Date: October 3
- Location: Fleming Field
  Gainesville, FL

In the opening contest at Fleming Field in Gainesville on October 3 against coach Stanley L. Robinson's Mercer Bears, Florida won 24–0.

Horse Bishop scored in the first five minutes. Dick Brown added the extra point. In the third quarter, Brown added a field goal, and Cy Williams recovered a Mercer fumble in the endzone. Brown again converted the extra point. Cecil Beck ran across the final touchdown; Edgar C. Jones added the extra point.

=== Week 2: Southern College and Hampden-Sydney ===
==== Week 2a: Southern College ====
Week 2a: Southern College at Florida

Team	1	2	3	4	Total
Fla. Southern	0	0	0	0	0
• Florida	0	3	6	0	9

- Date: October 10
- Location: Fleming Field
  Gainesville, FL

In the first game of a doubleheader in Gainesville on October 10, the Gators defeated Southern College 9–0, using mostly reserves.

Tom Fuller made a field goal, the lone score of the first half. In the third period, Glen Whitaker intercepted a Southern pass and raced 20 yards for a touchdown.

==== Week 2b: Hampden–Sydney ====
Week 2b: Hampden–Sydney at Florida

Team	1	2	3	4	Total
Hamp.–Sydney	0	0	0	6	6
• Florida	3	7	6	6	22

- Date: October 10
- Location: Fleming Field
  Gainesville, FL

Florida defeated Hampden–Sydney College 22–6 in the second game of the doubleheader.

Edgar C. Jones scored first with a field goal. Lamar Sarra once scored after blocking a punt, gathering the ball, and running 10 yards to the endzone. Burnett added the extra point. Tiny Chaplin made the next touchdown; and the final touchdown was a 22-yard run by Jones.

Hampden–Sydney's score came when Atkins picked up a Florida fumble and raced 40 yards for a touchdown.

=== Week 3: at Georgia Tech ===
Week 3: Florida at Georgia Tech

Team	1	2	3	4	Total
Florida	0	0	7	0	7
• Ga. Tech	7	3	13	0	23

- Date: October 17
- Location: Grant Field
  Atlanta, GA

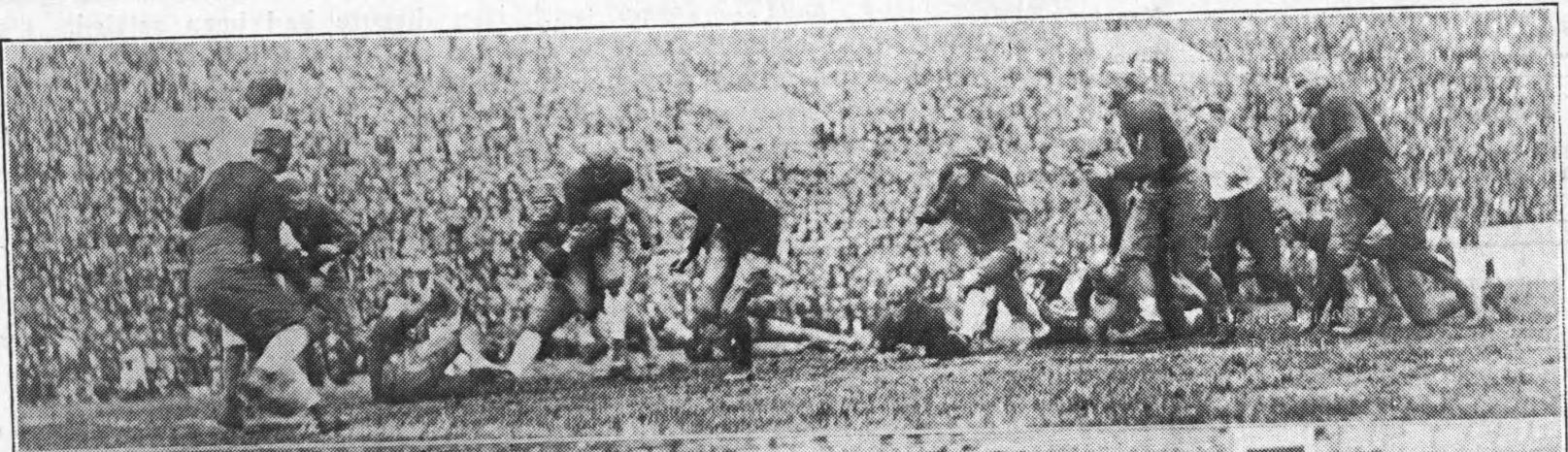
A view of the game against Georgia Tech at Grant Field

Florida lost big to Bill Alexander's Georgia Tech Yellow Jackets 23–7. The Gators made just five first downs to Tech's 15. "After 5,000 fans had journeyed to Atlanta certain that captain Edgar Jones...would lead the Saurians to a glorious victory."

Tech's Doug Wycoff scored two touchdowns. Wycoff scored first, and Ike Williams added the extra point. In the second period, Williams made a 12-yard field goal. Wycoff and Sam Murray scored in the third period, with one extra point converted by Williams.

The lone Gator touchdown came after a series of forward passes put them within Tech territory, including one of nearly 20 yards from Edgar C. Jones to Livingston. A 26-yard end run from Jones brought Florida to Tech's 4-yard line. Jones then scored through the line and kicked goal.

The starting lineup was: Anderson (left end), Williams (left tackle), Stewart (left guard), Sarra (center), Norton (right guard), Goldstein (right tackle), Todd (right end), Stanley (quarterback), Ihrig (left halfback), Bishop (right halfback), Chaplin (fullback).

=== Week 4: Wake Forest ===
Week 4: Wake Forest at Florida

Team	1	2	3	4	Total
Wake	3	0	0	0	3
• Florida	0	10	7	7	24

- Date: October 24
- Location: Fleming Field
  Gainesville, FL

The Gators practiced at night with whitewashed footballs in preparation for the homecoming contest with the Wake Forest Demon Deacons. On the back of Edgar C. Jones, who accounted for every point for his squad, Florida won 24–3.

A field goal by Wake's Rackley gave the Demon Deacons a 3–0 lead at the end of the first quarter. Jones then scored a touchdown, extra point, and converted a field goal by half's end. A pass from Burnett to Jones made Florida's next touchdown. Jones went through tackle for the final score.

=== Week 5: Rollins ===
Florida rolled up a 61–0 score on the Rollins Tars, scoring 26 in the first quarter.

=== Week 6: at Clemson ===
Week 6: Florida at Clemson

Team	1	2	3	4	Total
• Florida	6	0	21	15	42
Clemson	0	0	0	0	0

- Date: November 7
- Location: Riggs Field
  Clemson, SC
- Referee: Perr (Sewanee)

In the most impressive win of the season, the Gators beat the Clemson Tigers 42–0 on the road.

Edgar C. Jones had a 28-yard run lead to a touchdown and another 30-yard touchdown run. Fullback Horse Bishop accounted for three touchdowns: one a run of 20 yards from scrimmage and two 30-yard interception returns. Capt. Jones was declared the best back to run on a South Carolina gridiron in a number of years.

The starting lineup was: Green (left end), Williams (left tackle), Norton (left guard), Sarra (center), Davis (right guard), Petronis (right tackle), Whitaker (right end), Stanley (quarterback), Brown (left halfback), Jones (right halfback), Bishop (fullback).

=== Week 7: at Alabama ===
Week 7: Florida at Alabama

Team	1	2	3	4	Total
Florida	0	0	0	0	0
• Alabama	7	6	7	14	34

- Date: November 14
- Location: Cramton Bowl
  Montgomery, AL
- Referee: Kittleman

A large crowd was expected in Montgomery for the game against coach Wallace Wade's Alabama Crimson Tide. The return to the lineup of Tide center Gordon Holmes, injured against Georgia Tech, and the battle between backs Mack Brown and Edgar C. Jones brought intrigue.

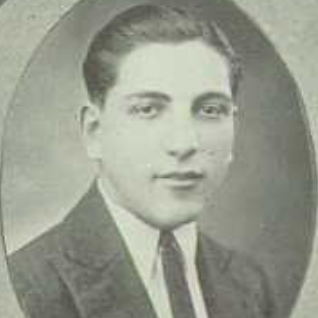
Goldy Goldstein.

Mack Brown made two touchdowns; Red Barnes two, and Pooley Hubert one on an interception. Brown's first score came when he caught the ball on a pass from Hubert at the 15-yard line, dodged Jones and scored. A pass from Hubert to Brown in the end zone netted the second score. Florida's Scott returned the kickoff to Alabama's 20-yard line, nearly breaking the tackle there. Two Barnes interceptions set up his touchdowns, one a 16-yard run after catch and another an end run. Jones attempted a drop kick, which was short and returned by Brown for 35 yards. A drive and a pass to Barnes got Alabama to Florida's 3-yard line, and Hubert scored over center.

Goldy Goldstein was the undisputed star for the Gators.

The starting lineup was: Green (left end), Williams (left tackle), Norton (left guard), Sarra (center), Stewart (right guard), Goldstein (right tackle), E. Jones (right end), W. Jones (quarterback), Brown (left halfback), Burnett (right halfback), Bishop (fullback).

=== Week 8: Mississippi A&M ===
Week 8: Mississippi A&M at Florida

Team	1	2	3	4	Total
Miss. A&M	0	0	0	0	0
• Florida	0	6	6	0	12

- Date: November 21
- Location: Plant Field
  Tampa, FL
- Game attendance: 20,000

For the ninth week of play, the Gators met coach Bernie Bierman's Mississippi Aggies in Tampa on Plant Field and won 12–0.

Edgar C. Jones, Lamar Sarra, and Greek Petronis were nursing injuries from the Alabama loss, and the Mississippi Aggies had lost to Alabama by just a touchdown. Despite this, Jones kicked two field goals and scored the only touchdown in a 12–0 victory.

After a bitterly fought first quarter, Jones netted 27-yard and 40-yard field goals for a 6–0 lead at the half. Jones ran off tackle for the game's only touchdown. Some 20,000 were in attendance.

=== Week 9: Washington & Lee ===
Week 9: Washington & Lee at Florida

Team	1	2	3	4	Total
W&L	0	7	7	0	14
• Florida	3	0	7	7	17

- Date: November 26
- Location: Barrs Field
  Jacksonville, FL
- Game attendance: 15,000

The annual Thanksgiving game in Jacksonville with coach James DeHart's Washington & Lee Generals was marked by both teams' use of the forward pass and brought the highlight of the season. Once behind by a 14–3 deficit, Florida came back and won 17–14.

The yearbook remarked: "Not since the 1923 Alabama game has Florida participated in a more brilliant, thrilling, and colorful football game." Edgar C. Jones made a 29-yard field goal in the first quarter, but the Generals responded with a touchdown from Palmer in the second. A 25-yard finger-tip touchdown catch by Spotts put the Gators behind 14–3. Jones ran in a touchdown; 14–10. Then in the fourth quarter Cy Williams blocked a Generals' punt. On fourth down, Jones caught the winning touchdown from Horse Bishop.

== Postseason ==
For the third year in a row, Goldy Goldstein made composite All-Southern. Captain Edgar C. Jones played in a charity game.

== Players ==
=== Depth chart ===
The following chart provides a visual depiction of Florida's lineup during the 1925 season with games started at the position reflected in parentheses. The chart mimics a Notre Dame Box on offense.

LE
Tom Green (2)
Stonebruise Anderson (1)

LT	LG	C	RG	RT
Cy Williams (3)	Clyde Norton (2)	Lamar Sarra (3)	Clyde Davis (1)	Goldy Goldstein (2)
	Jack Stewart (1)		Clyde Norton (1)	Greek Petronis (1)
			Jack Stewart (1)	

RE
Edgar Jones (1)
Todd (1)
Whitaker (1)

QB
Spic Stanley (2)
W. Jones (1)

RHB
Horse Bishop (1)
Burnett (1)
Edgar C. Jones (1)

LHB
Dick Brown (2)
Elmer Ihrig (1)

FB
Horse Bishop (2)
Tiny Chaplin (1)

=== Line ===
Player	Position	Games started	Hometown	Prep school	Height	Weight	Age
W. F. "Stonebruise" Anderson	guard						
Ralph Champlain	tackle						
Clyde Davis	guard						
Goldy Goldstein	guard		Jacksonville, Florida	Duval High	6'3"	210	21
Tom Green	end						
Cadillac Harry	tackle						
Clyde Norton	guard						
Frank Oosterhoudt	end						
Greek Petronis	tackle						
Ralph Proctor	center						
Lamar Sarra	center						
Jack Stewart	guard						
Edgar Todd	end						
Glen Whitaker	end						
Cy Williams	tackle		Sopchoppy, Florida		6'0"	200	

=== Backfield ===
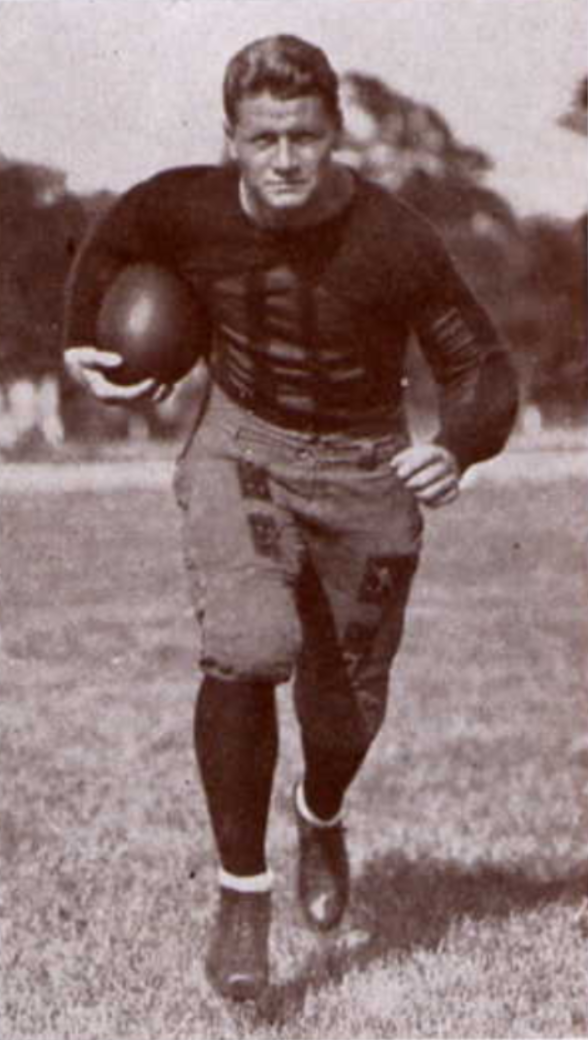
Edgar C. Jones

Player	Position	Games started	Hometown	Prep school	Height	Weight	Age
Cecil Beck	halfback						
Horse Bishop	fullback						
Dick Brown	halfback						
Tiny Chaplin	fullback				6'1"	195	
Tom Fuller	fullback						
Elmer Ihrig	fullback		Fort Myers, Florida	Fort Myers High	5'8"	174	21
Edgar C. Jones	halfback/quarterback		Jacksonville, Florida	Jacksonville High			
Spic Stanley	halfback						

== See also ==
- 1925 College Football All-Southern Team

== Bibliography ==
- Carlson, Norm (2007). University of Florida Football Vault: The History of the Florida Gators. Atlanta, Georgia: Whitman Publishing, LLC. ISBN 978-0-7948-2298-9.
- University of Florida (1926). The Seminole. Vol. 17.
- Woodruff, Fuzzy (1928). A History of Southern Football 1890–1928. Vol. 3.
