= 1925 Vanderbilt Commodores football team =

American college football season

1925 Vanderbilt Commodores football
- Conference: Southern Conference
- Record: 6–3 (3–3 SoCon)
- Head coach: Dan McGugin (21st season)
- Captain: Gil Reese
- Home stadium: Dudley Field

Uniform
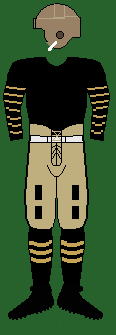

1925 Southern Conference football standings
	Conf.					Overall
Team	W		L		T	W		L		T
No. 2 Alabama +	7	–	0	–	0	10	–	0	–	0
No. 6 Tulane +	5	–	0	–	0	9	–	0	–	1
North Carolina	4	–	0	–	1	7	–	1	–	1
Washington and Lee	5	–	1	–	0	5	–	5	–	0
Virginia	4	–	1	–	1	7	–	1	–	1
Georgia Tech	4	–	1	–	1	6	–	2	–	1
Kentucky	4	–	2	–	0	6	–	3	–	0
Florida	3	–	2	–	0	8	–	2	–	0
Auburn	3	–	2	–	1	5	–	3	–	1
VPI	3	–	3	–	1	5	–	3	–	2
Vanderbilt	3	–	3	–	0	6	–	3	–	0
Tennessee	2	–	2	–	1	5	–	2	–	1
South Carolina	2	–	2	–	0	7	–	3	–	0
Georgia	2	–	4	–	0	4	–	5	–	0
Sewanee	1	–	4	–	0	4	–	4	–	1
Mississippi A&M	1	–	4	–	0	3	–	4	–	1
VMI	1	–	5	–	0	5	–	5	–	0
LSU	0	–	2	–	1	5	–	3	–	1
NC State	0	–	4	–	1	3	–	5	–	1
Ole Miss	0	–	4	–	0	5	–	5	–	0
Clemson	0	–	4	–	0	1	–	7	–	0
Maryland	0	–	4	–	0	2	–	5	–	1
+ – Conference co-champions; Rankings from Dickinson System

The 1925 Vanderbilt Commodores football team was an American football team that represented Vanderbilt University as a member of the Southern Conference during the 1925 football season. In its 21st year under head coach Dan McGugin, the team compiled a 6–3 record (3–3 against conference opponents), finished in 11th place in the conference, and outscored opponents by a total of 158 to 63.

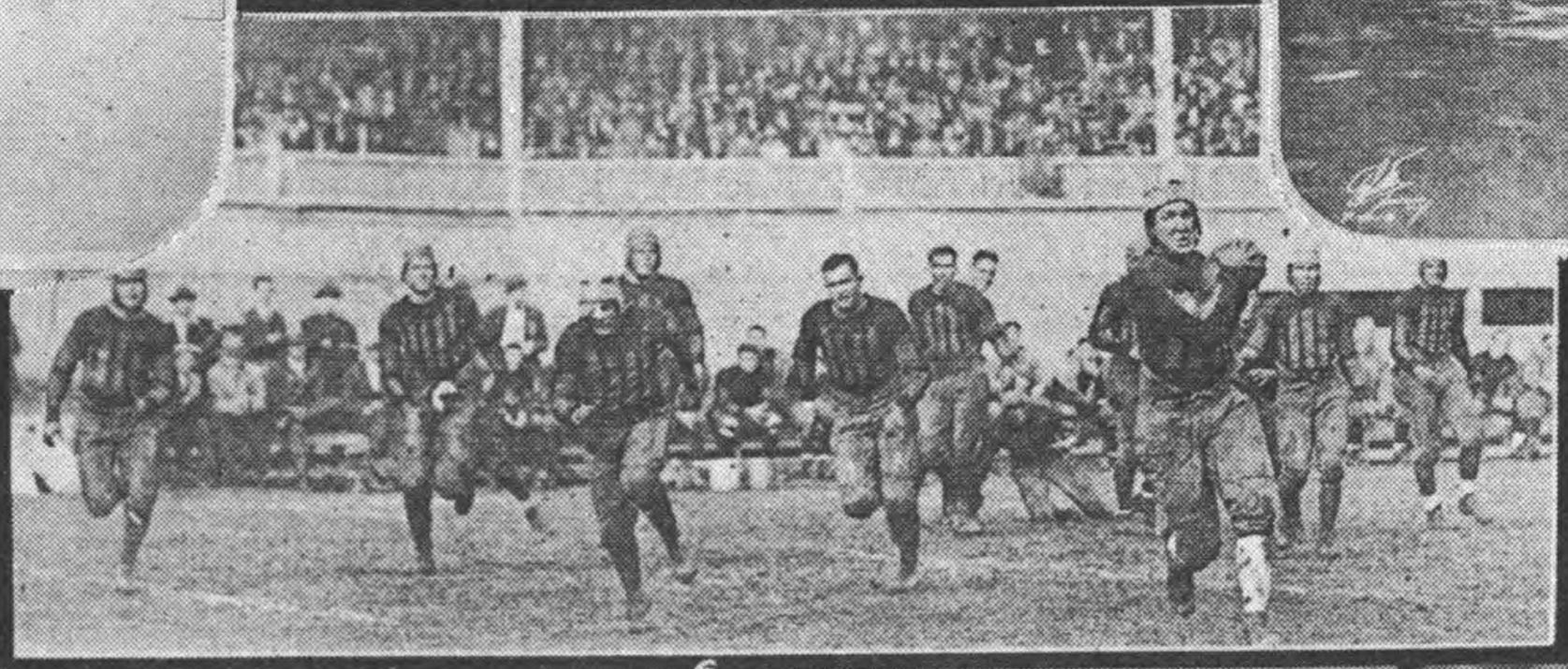
The Georgia game at Sanford Field

== Schedule ==
Date	Opponent	Site	Result	Attendance	Source
September 26	Middle Tennessee State Teachers*	Dudley Field; Nashville, TN	W 27–0		
October 3	Henderson-Brown	Dudley Field; Nashville, TN	W 41–0		
October 10	Texas	Dudley Field; Nashville, Tennessee	W 14–6		
October 17	Tennessee	Dudley Field; Nashville, TN (rivalry)	W 34–7		
October 24	at Georgia	Sanford Field; Athens, GA (rivalry)	L 7–26	7,000	
October 31	Ole Miss	Dudley Field; Nashville, TN (rivalry)	W 7–0		
November 7	Georgia Tech	Dudley Field; Nashville, TN (rivalry)	L 0–7		
November 14	at Auburn	Rickwood Field; Birmingham, AL	L 9–10		
November 26	Sewanee	Dudley Field; Nashville, TN (rivalry)	W 19–7		
*Non-conference game
