= 1925 Tennessee Volunteers football team =

American college football season

1925 Tennessee Volunteers football
- Conference: Southern Conference
- Record: 5–2–1 (2–2–1 SoCon)
- Head coach: M. B. Banks (5th season)
- Captain: J. G. Lowe
- Home stadium: Shields–Watkins Field

Uniform
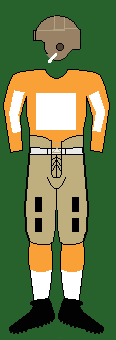

1925 Southern Conference football standings
	Conf.					Overall
Team	W		L		T	W		L		T
No. 2 Alabama +	7	–	0	–	0	10	–	0	–	0
No. 6 Tulane +	5	–	0	–	0	9	–	0	–	1
North Carolina	4	–	0	–	1	7	–	1	–	1
Washington and Lee	5	–	1	–	0	5	–	5	–	0
Virginia	4	–	1	–	1	7	–	1	–	1
Georgia Tech	4	–	1	–	1	6	–	2	–	1
Kentucky	4	–	2	–	0	6	–	3	–	0
Florida	3	–	2	–	0	8	–	2	–	0
Auburn	3	–	2	–	1	5	–	3	–	1
VPI	3	–	3	–	1	5	–	3	–	2
Vanderbilt	3	–	3	–	0	6	–	3	–	0
Tennessee	2	–	2	–	1	5	–	2	–	1
South Carolina	2	–	2	–	0	7	–	3	–	0
Georgia	2	–	4	–	0	4	–	5	–	0
Sewanee	1	–	4	–	0	4	–	4	–	1
Mississippi A&M	1	–	4	–	0	3	–	4	–	1
VMI	1	–	5	–	0	5	–	5	–	0
LSU	0	–	2	–	1	5	–	3	–	1
NC State	0	–	4	–	1	3	–	5	–	1
Ole Miss	0	–	4	–	0	5	–	5	–	0
Clemson	0	–	4	–	0	1	–	7	–	0
Maryland	0	–	4	–	0	2	–	5	–	1
+ – Conference co-champions; Rankings from Dickinson System

The 1925 Tennessee Volunteers football team (variously "Tennessee", "UT" or the "Vols") was an American football team that represented the University of Tennessee as a member of the Southern Conference during the 1925 season. In its fifth and final year under head coach M. B. Banks, Tennessee compiled a 5–2–1 record (2–2–1 against conference opponents), finished in 12th place in the conference, shut out four of eight opponents, and outscored all opponents by a total of 129 to 73. The team played its home games at Shields–Watkins Field in Knoxville, Tennessee.

== Schedule ==
Date	Opponent	Site	Result	Attendance	Source
October 3	Emory and Henry*	Shields–Watkins Field; Knoxville, TN	W 51–0		
October 10	Maryville (TN)*	Shields–Watkins Field; Knoxville, TB	W 13–0		
October 17	at Vanderbilt	Dudley Field; Nashville, Tennessee (rivalry)	L 7–34		
October 24	LSU	Shields–Watkins Field; Knoxville, TN	T 0–0		
October 31	Georgia	Shields–Watkins Field; Knoxville, TN (rivalry)	W 12–7		
November 7	at Centre*	Cheek Field and Farris Stadium; Danville, KY	W 12–0	1,000	
November 14	Mississippi A&M^{†}	Shields–Watkins Field; Knoxville, TN	W 14–9		
November 26	at Kentucky	Stoll Field; Lexington, KY (rivalry)	L 20–23		
*Non-conference game; ^{†}Homecoming
