= 1925 Auburn Tigers football team =

American college football season

1925 Auburn Tigers football
- Conference: Southern Conference
- Record: 5–3–1 (3–2–1 SoCon)
- Head coach: Dave Morey (1st season)
- Captain: Edward M. "Red" Harkins
- Home stadium: Drake Field; Rickwood Field; Cramton Bowl

1925 Southern Conference football standings
	Conf.					Overall
Team	W		L		T	W		L		T
No. 2 Alabama +	7	–	0	–	0	10	–	0	–	0
No. 6 Tulane +	5	–	0	–	0	9	–	0	–	1
North Carolina	4	–	0	–	1	7	–	1	–	1
Washington and Lee	5	–	1	–	0	5	–	5	–	0
Virginia	4	–	1	–	1	7	–	1	–	1
Georgia Tech	4	–	1	–	1	6	–	2	–	1
Kentucky	4	–	2	–	0	6	–	3	–	0
Florida	3	–	2	–	0	8	–	2	–	0
Auburn	3	–	2	–	1	5	–	3	–	1
VPI	3	–	3	–	1	5	–	3	–	2
Vanderbilt	3	–	3	–	0	6	–	3	–	0
Tennessee	2	–	2	–	1	5	–	2	–	1
South Carolina	2	–	2	–	0	7	–	3	–	0
Georgia	2	–	4	–	0	4	–	5	–	0
Sewanee	1	–	4	–	0	4	–	4	–	1
Mississippi A&M	1	–	4	–	0	3	–	4	–	1
VMI	1	–	5	–	0	5	–	5	–	0
LSU	0	–	2	–	1	5	–	3	–	1
NC State	0	–	4	–	1	3	–	5	–	1
Ole Miss	0	–	4	–	0	5	–	5	–	0
Clemson	0	–	4	–	0	1	–	7	–	0
Maryland	0	–	4	–	0	2	–	5	–	1
+ – Conference co-champions; Rankings from Dickinson System

The 1925 Auburn Tigers football team was an American football team that represented Auburn University as a member of the Southern Conference during the 1925 season. In its first season under head coach Dave Morey, Auburn compiled a 5–3–1 record (3–2–1 against conference opponents), finished ninth in the conference, and was outscored by a total of 114 to 81. The team played its home games at Drake Field in Auburn, Alabama (two games), Rickwood Field in Birmingham, Alabama (one game), and the Cramton Bowl in Montgomery, Alabama (one game).

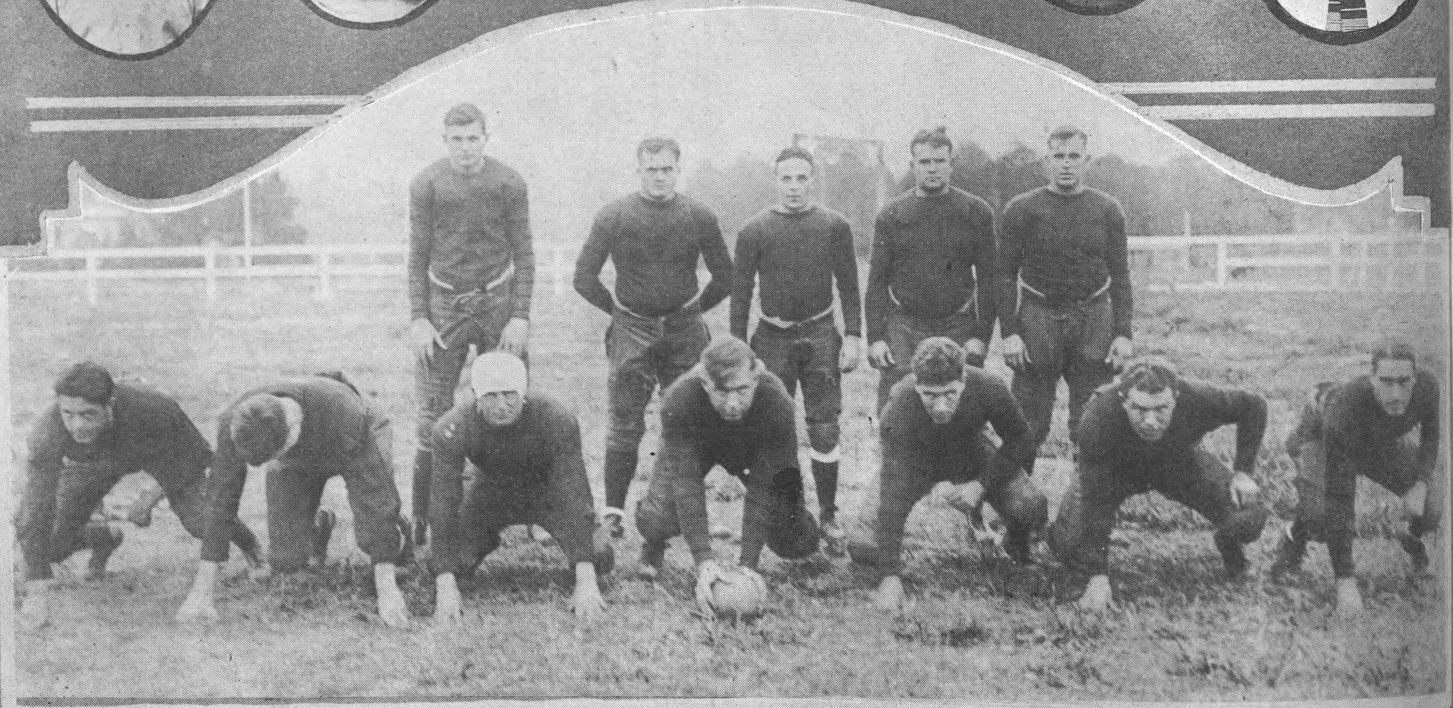
The first-string players for the team

== Schedule ==
Date	Opponent	Site	Result	Attendance	Source
September 26	at Birmingham–Southern*	Munger Bowl; Birmingham, AL	W 25–6		
October 3	at Clemson	Riggs Field; Clemson, SC (rivalry)	W 13–6		
October 10	VPI^{†}	Drake Field; Auburn, AL	W 19–0	5,000	
October 17	at Texas*	Fair Park Stadium; Dallas, TX	L 0–33		
October 24	Howard (AL)*	Drake Field; Auburn, AL	W 7–6		
October 31	Tulane	Cramton Bowl; Montgomery, AL (rivalry)	L 0–13	8,000	
November 7	vs. Georgia	Memorial Stadium; Columbus, GA (rivalry)	L 0–34	10,000	
November 14	Vanderbilt	Rickwood Field; Birmingham, AL	W 10–9		
November 26	at Georgia Tech	Grant Field; Atlanta, GA (rivalry)	T 7–7	20,000	
*Non-conference game; ^{†}Homecoming
