= 1925 Clemson Tigers football team =

American college football season

1925 Clemson Tigers football
- Conference: Southern Conference
- Record: 1–7 (0–4 SoCon)
- Head coach: Bud Saunders (3rd season)
- Captain: G. I. Finklea
- Home stadium: Riggs Field

1925 Southern Conference football standings
	Conf.					Overall
Team	W		L		T	W		L		T
No. 2 Alabama +	7	–	0	–	0	10	–	0	–	0
No. 6 Tulane +	5	–	0	–	0	9	–	0	–	1
North Carolina	4	–	0	–	1	7	–	1	–	1
Washington and Lee	5	–	1	–	0	5	–	5	–	0
Virginia	4	–	1	–	1	7	–	1	–	1
Georgia Tech	4	–	1	–	1	6	–	2	–	1
Kentucky	4	–	2	–	0	6	–	3	–	0
Florida	3	–	2	–	0	8	–	2	–	0
Auburn	3	–	2	–	1	5	–	3	–	1
VPI	3	–	3	–	1	5	–	3	–	2
Vanderbilt	3	–	3	–	0	6	–	3	–	0
Tennessee	2	–	2	–	1	5	–	2	–	1
South Carolina	2	–	2	–	0	7	–	3	–	0
Georgia	2	–	4	–	0	4	–	5	–	0
Sewanee	1	–	4	–	0	4	–	4	–	1
Mississippi A&M	1	–	4	–	0	3	–	4	–	1
VMI	1	–	5	–	0	5	–	5	–	0
LSU	0	–	2	–	1	5	–	3	–	1
NC State	0	–	4	–	1	3	–	5	–	1
Ole Miss	0	–	4	–	0	5	–	5	–	0
Clemson	0	–	4	–	0	1	–	7	–	0
Maryland	0	–	4	–	0	2	–	5	–	1
+ – Conference co-champions; Rankings from Dickinson System

The 1925 Clemson Tigers football team was an American football team that represented Clemson Agricultural College as a member of the Southern Conference during its 1925 football season. In its third season under head coach Bud Saunders, Clemson compiled a 1–7 record (0–4 against conference opponents), tied for last place in the conference, was shut out in five of its eight games, and was outscored by a total of 160 to 18. The team played its home games at Riggs Field in Clemson, South Carolina (then known as Calhoun, South Carolina).

== Schedule ==
Date	Opponent	Site	Result	Attendance	Source
September 26	Presbyterian	Riggs Field; Calhoun, SC	L 9–14		
October 3	Auburn	Riggs Field; Calhoun, SC (rivalry)	L 6–13		
October 10	at Kentucky	Stoll Field; Lexington, KY	L 6–19		
October 22	at South Carolina	University Field; Columbia, SC (rivalry)	L 0–33	> 12,000	
October 29	at Wofford	Spartanburg, SC	L 0–13		
November 7	Florida	Riggs Field; Calhoun, SC	L 0–42		
November 14	at The Citadel	College Park Stadium; Charleston, SC	W 6–0		
November 26	Furman	Manly Field; Greenville, SC	L 0–26		
