= 1925 LSU Tigers football team =

American college football season

1925 LSU Tigers football
- Conference: Southern Conference
- Record: 5–3–1 (0–2–1 SoCon)
- Head coach: Mike Donahue (3rd season)
- Captain: Jonathan E. Steele
- Home stadium: Tiger Stadium

1925 Southern Conference football standings
	Conf.					Overall
Team	W		L		T	W		L		T
No. 2 Alabama +	7	–	0	–	0	10	–	0	–	0
No. 6 Tulane +	5	–	0	–	0	9	–	0	–	1
North Carolina	4	–	0	–	1	7	–	1	–	1
Washington and Lee	5	–	1	–	0	5	–	5	–	0
Virginia	4	–	1	–	1	7	–	1	–	1
Georgia Tech	4	–	1	–	1	6	–	2	–	1
Kentucky	4	–	2	–	0	6	–	3	–	0
Florida	3	–	2	–	0	8	–	2	–	0
Auburn	3	–	2	–	1	5	–	3	–	1
VPI	3	–	3	–	1	5	–	3	–	2
Vanderbilt	3	–	3	–	0	6	–	3	–	0
Tennessee	2	–	2	–	1	5	–	2	–	1
South Carolina	2	–	2	–	0	7	–	3	–	0
Georgia	2	–	4	–	0	4	–	5	–	0
Sewanee	1	–	4	–	0	4	–	4	–	1
Mississippi A&M	1	–	4	–	0	3	–	4	–	1
VMI	1	–	5	–	0	5	–	5	–	0
LSU	0	–	2	–	1	5	–	3	–	1
NC State	0	–	4	–	1	3	–	5	–	1
Ole Miss	0	–	4	–	0	5	–	5	–	0
Clemson	0	–	4	–	0	1	–	7	–	0
Maryland	0	–	4	–	0	2	–	5	–	1
+ – Conference co-champions; Rankings from Dickinson System

The 1925 LSU Tigers football team was an American football team that represented Louisiana State University (LSU) as a member of the Southern Conference during the 1925 college football season. In its third season under head coach Mike Donahue, LSU compiled a 5–3–1 record (0–2–1 against conference opponents). LSU's first official homecoming game occurred in 1925.

== Schedule ==
Date	Opponent	Site	Result	Attendance	Source
September 26	Louisiana Normal*	Tiger Stadium; Baton Rouge, LA	W 27–0		
October 3	Southwestern Louisiana*	Tiger Stadium; Baton Rouge, LA	W 38–6		
October 10	Alabama^{†}	Tiger Stadium; Baton Rouge, LA (rivalry)	L 0–42	8,000	
October 17	LSU freshmen*	Tiger Stadium; Baton Rouge, LA	W 6–0		
October 24	at Tennessee	Shields–Watkins Field; Knoxville, TN	T 0–0		
October 31	vs. Arkansas*	Fair Grounds; Shreveport, LA (rivalry)	L 0–12	8,000	
November 7	Rice*	Tiger Stadium; Baton Rouge, LA	W 6–0		
November 13	at Loyola (LA)*	Loyola Stadium; New Orleans, LA	W 13–0		
November 21	Tulane	Tiger Stadium; Baton Rouge, LA (Battle for the Rag)	L 0–16		
*Non-conference game; ^{†}Homecoming
