= 1925 Sewanee Tigers football team =

American college football season

1925 Sewanee Tigers football
- Conference: Southern Conference
- Record: 4–4–1 (1–4 SoCon)
- Head coach: M. S. Bennett (3rd season)
- Captain: George H. Barker
- Home stadium: Hardee Field

1925 Southern Conference football standings
	Conf.					Overall
Team	W		L		T	W		L		T
No. 2 Alabama +	7	–	0	–	0	10	–	0	–	0
No. 6 Tulane +	5	–	0	–	0	9	–	0	–	1
North Carolina	4	–	0	–	1	7	–	1	–	1
Washington and Lee	5	–	1	–	0	5	–	5	–	0
Virginia	4	–	1	–	1	7	–	1	–	1
Georgia Tech	4	–	1	–	1	6	–	2	–	1
Kentucky	4	–	2	–	0	6	–	3	–	0
Florida	3	–	2	–	0	8	–	2	–	0
Auburn	3	–	2	–	1	5	–	3	–	1
VPI	3	–	3	–	1	5	–	3	–	2
Vanderbilt	3	–	3	–	0	6	–	3	–	0
Tennessee	2	–	2	–	1	5	–	2	–	1
South Carolina	2	–	2	–	0	7	–	3	–	0
Georgia	2	–	4	–	0	4	–	5	–	0
Sewanee	1	–	4	–	0	4	–	4	–	1
Mississippi A&M	1	–	4	–	0	3	–	4	–	1
VMI	1	–	5	–	0	5	–	5	–	0
LSU	0	–	2	–	1	5	–	3	–	1
NC State	0	–	4	–	1	3	–	5	–	1
Ole Miss	0	–	4	–	0	5	–	5	–	0
Clemson	0	–	4	–	0	1	–	7	–	0
Maryland	0	–	4	–	0	2	–	5	–	1
+ – Conference co-champions; Rankings from Dickinson System

The 1925 Sewanee Tigers football team was an American football team that represented the Sewanee Tigers of Sewanee: The University of the South as a member of the Southern Conference during the 1925 college football season. In its third season under head coach M. S. Bennett, the team compiled a 4–4–1 record (1–4 against conference opponents).

== Schedule ==
Date	Opponent	Site	Result	Source
September 26	Bryson College*	Hardee Field; Sewanee, TN	W 14–0	
October 3	Middle Tennessee State*	Hardee Field; Sewanee, TN	W 53–0	
October 10	at Texas A&M*	Fair Park Stadium; Dallas, TX	T 6–6	
October 17	at Alabama	Rickwood Field; Birmingham, AL	L 0–27	
October 24	at Kentucky	Stoll Field; Lexington, KY	L 0–14	
October 31	at Chattanooga*	Chamberlain Field; Chattanooga, TN	W 28–0	
November 7	vs. Ole Miss	Chamberlain Field; Chattanooga, TN	W 10–9	
November 14	at Tulane	Tulane Stadium; New Orleans, LA	L 0–14	
November 26	at Vanderbilt	Dudley Field; Nashville, TN (rivalry)	L 7–19	
*Non-conference game
