= 1925 South Carolina Gamecocks football team =

American college football season

1925 South Carolina Gamecocks football
- Conference: Southern Conference
- Record: 7–3 (2–2 SoCon)
- Head coach: Branch Bocock (1st season)
- Captain: J. C. Long
- Home stadium: University Field

1925 Southern Conference football standings
	Conf.					Overall
Team	W		L		T	W		L		T
No. 2 Alabama +	7	–	0	–	0	10	–	0	–	0
No. 6 Tulane +	5	–	0	–	0	9	–	0	–	1
North Carolina	4	–	0	–	1	7	–	1	–	1
Washington and Lee	5	–	1	–	0	5	–	5	–	0
Virginia	4	–	1	–	1	7	–	1	–	1
Georgia Tech	4	–	1	–	1	6	–	2	–	1
Kentucky	4	–	2	–	0	6	–	3	–	0
Florida	3	–	2	–	0	8	–	2	–	0
Auburn	3	–	2	–	1	5	–	3	–	1
VPI	3	–	3	–	1	5	–	3	–	2
Vanderbilt	3	–	3	–	0	6	–	3	–	0
Tennessee	2	–	2	–	1	5	–	2	–	1
South Carolina	2	–	2	–	0	7	–	3	–	0
Georgia	2	–	4	–	0	4	–	5	–	0
Sewanee	1	–	4	–	0	4	–	4	–	1
Mississippi A&M	1	–	4	–	0	3	–	4	–	1
VMI	1	–	5	–	0	5	–	5	–	0
LSU	0	–	2	–	1	5	–	3	–	1
NC State	0	–	4	–	1	3	–	5	–	1
Ole Miss	0	–	4	–	0	5	–	5	–	0
Clemson	0	–	4	–	0	1	–	7	–	0
Maryland	0	–	4	–	0	2	–	5	–	1
+ – Conference co-champions; Rankings from Dickinson System

The 1925 South Carolina Gamecocks football team was an American football team that represented the University of South Carolina during the 1925 Southern Conference football season. In its first season under head coach Branch Bocock, South Carolina compiled a 7–3 record (2–2 against conference opponents), tied for 10th place in the conference, shut out five of ten opponents, and outscored all opponents by a total of 150 to 27.

== Schedule ==
Date	Time	Opponent	Site	Result	Attendance	Source
September 26		Erskine*	University Field; Columbia, SC	W 33–0		
October 3		North Carolina	University Field; Columbia, SC (rivalry)	L 0–7		
October 10		at NC State	Riddick Stadium; Raleigh, NC (rivalry)	W 7–6		
October 16		Wofford*	University Field; Columbia, SC	W 6–0		
October 22		Clemson	University Field; Columbia, SC (rivalry)	W 33–0	> 12,000	
October 28		vs. The Citadel*	County Fairgrounds; Orangeburg, SC	W 30–6		
October 31	2:30 p.m.	vs. VPI	Mayo Island Park; Richmond, VA	L 0–6		
November 14		at Furman*	Manly Field; Greenville, SC	L 0–2		
November 20		Presbyterian*	University Field; Columbia, SC	W 21–0	4,500	
November 28	2:30 p.m.	Centre*	University Field; Columbia, SC	W 20–0		
*Non-conference game; All times are in Eastern time
