= 1925 Kentucky Wildcats football team =

American college football season

1925 Kentucky Wildcats football
- Conference: Southern Conference
- Record: 6–3 (4–2 SoCon)
- Head coach: Fred J. Murphy (2nd season)
- Captain: Albert D. Kirwan
- Home stadium: Stoll Field

1925 Southern Conference football standings
	Conf.					Overall
Team	W		L		T	W		L		T
No. 2 Alabama +	7	–	0	–	0	10	–	0	–	0
No. 6 Tulane +	5	–	0	–	0	9	–	0	–	1
North Carolina	4	–	0	–	1	7	–	1	–	1
Washington and Lee	5	–	1	–	0	5	–	5	–	0
Virginia	4	–	1	–	1	7	–	1	–	1
Georgia Tech	4	–	1	–	1	6	–	2	–	1
Kentucky	4	–	2	–	0	6	–	3	–	0
Florida	3	–	2	–	0	8	–	2	–	0
Auburn	3	–	2	–	1	5	–	3	–	1
VPI	3	–	3	–	1	5	–	3	–	2
Vanderbilt	3	–	3	–	0	6	–	3	–	0
Tennessee	2	–	2	–	1	5	–	2	–	1
South Carolina	2	–	2	–	0	7	–	3	–	0
Georgia	2	–	4	–	0	4	–	5	–	0
Sewanee	1	–	4	–	0	4	–	4	–	1
Mississippi A&M	1	–	4	–	0	3	–	4	–	1
VMI	1	–	5	–	0	5	–	5	–	0
LSU	0	–	2	–	1	5	–	3	–	1
NC State	0	–	4	–	1	3	–	5	–	1
Ole Miss	0	–	4	–	0	5	–	5	–	0
Clemson	0	–	4	–	0	1	–	7	–	0
Maryland	0	–	4	–	0	2	–	5	–	1
+ – Conference co-champions; Rankings from Dickinson System

The 1925 Kentucky Wildcats football team was an American football team that represented the University of Kentucky as a member of the Southern Conference (SoCon) during the 1925 season. In its second season under head coach Fred J. Murphy, Kentucky compiled an overall record of 6–3 with a mark of 4–2 against conference opponents, finished seventh in the SoCon, and was outscored by a total of 97 to 92. The team played its home games at Stoll Field in Lexington, Kentucky.

== Schedule ==
Date	Opponent	Site	Result	Attendance	Source
September 26	Maryville (TN)*	Stoll Field; Lexington, KY	W 13–6		
October 3	at Chicago*	Stagg Field; Chicago, IL	L 0–9	32,000	
October 10	Clemson	Stoll Field; Lexington, KY	W 19–6		
October 17	Washington and Lee	Stoll Field; Lexington, KY	L 0–25		
October 24	Sewanee	Stoll Field; Lexington, KY	W 14–0		
October 31	at Centre*	Cheek Field; Danville, KY (rivalry)	W 16–0	11,000	
November 7	at Alabama	Rickwood Field; Birmingham, AL	L 0–31		
November 14	vs. VMI	Laidley Field; Charleston, WV	W 7–0		
November 26	Tennessee	Stoll Field; Lexington, KY (rivalry)	W 23–20		
*Non-conference game
