= 1925 Mississippi A&M Aggies football team =

American college football season

1925 Mississippi A&M Aggies football

Mississippi state champion
- Conference: Southern Conference
- Record: 3–4–1 (1–4 SoCon)
- Head coach: Bernie Bierman (1st season)
- Home stadium: Scott Field

1925 Southern Conference football standings
	Conf.					Overall
Team	W		L		T	W		L		T
No. 2 Alabama +	7	–	0	–	0	10	–	0	–	0
No. 6 Tulane +	5	–	0	–	0	9	–	0	–	1
North Carolina	4	–	0	–	1	7	–	1	–	1
Washington and Lee	5	–	1	–	0	5	–	5	–	0
Virginia	4	–	1	–	1	7	–	1	–	1
Georgia Tech	4	–	1	–	1	6	–	2	–	1
Kentucky	4	–	2	–	0	6	–	3	–	0
Florida	3	–	2	–	0	8	–	2	–	0
Auburn	3	–	2	–	1	5	–	3	–	1
VPI	3	–	3	–	1	5	–	3	–	2
Vanderbilt	3	–	3	–	0	6	–	3	–	0
Tennessee	2	–	2	–	1	5	–	2	–	1
South Carolina	2	–	2	–	0	7	–	3	–	0
Georgia	2	–	4	–	0	4	–	5	–	0
Sewanee	1	–	4	–	0	4	–	4	–	1
Mississippi A&M	1	–	4	–	0	3	–	4	–	1
VMI	1	–	5	–	0	5	–	5	–	0
LSU	0	–	2	–	1	5	–	3	–	1
NC State	0	–	4	–	1	3	–	5	–	1
Ole Miss	0	–	4	–	0	5	–	5	–	0
Clemson	0	–	4	–	0	1	–	7	–	0
Maryland	0	–	4	–	0	2	–	5	–	1
+ – Conference co-champions; Rankings from Dickinson System

The 1925 Mississippi A&M Aggies football team was an American football team that represented the Agricultural and Mechanical College of the State of Mississippi (later renamed Mississippi State University) as a member of the Southern Conference during the 1925 season. In its first season under head coach Bernie Bierman, the team compiled a 3–4–1 record (1–4 against conference opponents), tied for 16th place in the conference, and outscored all opponents by a total of 101 to 60. The team played its home games at Davis Wade Stadium in Starkville, Mississippi. With victories over Millsaps, Ole Miss, and Mississippi College, Mississippi A&M was recognized as the 1925 Mississippi state champion.

Four Mississippi A&M players were selected by the Daily Clarion-Ledger as first-team players on its 1925 All-Mississippi football team: Meeks at quarterback; Clark at right halfback; Stone at left end; and Jones at center.

== Schedule ==
Date	Opponent	Site	Result	Attendance	Source
October 3	Millsaps*	Scott Field; Starkville, MS	W 34–0		
October 10	Ouachita Baptist*	Scott Field; Starkville, MS	T 3–3		
October 17	at Tulane	Tulane Stadium; New Orleans, LA	L 3–25		
October 24	vs. Ole Miss	Jackson, MS (rivalry)	W 6–0	10,000	
October 31	at Alabama	Denny Field; Tuscaloosa, AL (rivalry)	L 0–6	7,000	
November 7	Mississippi College*	Scott Field; Starkville, MS	W 46–0		
November 14	at Tennessee	Shields–Watkins Field; Knoxville, TN	L 9–14		
November 21	at Florida	Plant Field; Tampa, FL	L 0–12		
*Non-conference game
