= 1925 Maryland Aggies football team =

American college football season

1925 Maryland Aggies football
- Conference: Southern Conference
- Record: 2–5–1 (0–4 SoCon)
- Head coach: Curley Byrd (15th season)
- Home stadium: Byrd Stadium (original)

1925 Southern Conference football standings
	Conf.					Overall
Team	W		L		T	W		L		T
No. 2 Alabama +	7	–	0	–	0	10	–	0	–	0
No. 6 Tulane +	5	–	0	–	0	9	–	0	–	1
North Carolina	4	–	0	–	1	7	–	1	–	1
Washington and Lee	5	–	1	–	0	5	–	5	–	0
Virginia	4	–	1	–	1	7	–	1	–	1
Georgia Tech	4	–	1	–	1	6	–	2	–	1
Kentucky	4	–	2	–	0	6	–	3	–	0
Florida	3	–	2	–	0	8	–	2	–	0
Auburn	3	–	2	–	1	5	–	3	–	1
VPI	3	–	3	–	1	5	–	3	–	2
Vanderbilt	3	–	3	–	0	6	–	3	–	0
Tennessee	2	–	2	–	1	5	–	2	–	1
South Carolina	2	–	2	–	0	7	–	3	–	0
Georgia	2	–	4	–	0	4	–	5	–	0
Sewanee	1	–	4	–	0	4	–	4	–	1
Mississippi A&M	1	–	4	–	0	3	–	4	–	1
VMI	1	–	5	–	0	5	–	5	–	0
LSU	0	–	2	–	1	5	–	3	–	1
NC State	0	–	4	–	1	3	–	5	–	1
Ole Miss	0	–	4	–	0	5	–	5	–	0
Clemson	0	–	4	–	0	1	–	7	–	0
Maryland	0	–	4	–	0	2	–	5	–	1
+ – Conference co-champions; Rankings from Dickinson System

The 1925 Maryland Aggies football team represented the University of Maryland in the 1925 college football season. In their 15th season under head coach Curley Byrd, the Aggies compiled a 3–5 record (0–4 in conference), finished in a tie for last place in the Southern Conference, and were outscored by their opponents 82 to 53.

== Schedule ==
Date	Opponent	Site	Result	Source
September 26	Washington College*	Byrd Stadium; College Park, MD	W 13–0	
October 10	vs. Rutgers*	Franklin Field; Philadelphia, PA	W 16–0	
October 17	vs. VPI	Griffith Stadium; Washington, DC	L 0–3	
October 24	at Virginia	Lambeth Field; Charlottesville, VA	L 0–6	
October 31	vs. North Carolina	Baltimore Stadium; Baltimore, MD	L 0–16	
November 7	at Yale*	Yale Bowl; New Haven, CT	L 14–43	
November 14	Washington & Lee^{†}	Byrd Stadium; College Park, MD	L 3–7	
November 26	vs. Johns Hopkins*	Baltimore Stadium; Baltimore, MD	T 7–7	
*Non-conference game; ^{†}Homecoming
