= 1925 VMI Keydets football team =

American college football season

1925 VMI Keydets football
- Conference: Southern Conference
- Record: 5–5 (1–5 SoCon)
- Head coach: Blandy Clarkson (6th season)
- Home stadium: Alumni Field

1925 Southern Conference football standings
	Conf.					Overall
Team	W		L		T	W		L		T
No. 2 Alabama +	7	–	0	–	0	10	–	0	–	0
No. 6 Tulane +	5	–	0	–	0	9	–	0	–	1
North Carolina	4	–	0	–	1	7	–	1	–	1
Washington and Lee	5	–	1	–	0	5	–	5	–	0
Virginia	4	–	1	–	1	7	–	1	–	1
Georgia Tech	4	–	1	–	1	6	–	2	–	1
Kentucky	4	–	2	–	0	6	–	3	–	0
Florida	3	–	2	–	0	8	–	2	–	0
Auburn	3	–	2	–	1	5	–	3	–	1
VPI	3	–	3	–	1	5	–	3	–	2
Vanderbilt	3	–	3	–	0	6	–	3	–	0
Tennessee	2	–	2	–	1	5	–	2	–	1
South Carolina	2	–	2	–	0	7	–	3	–	0
Georgia	2	–	4	–	0	4	–	5	–	0
Sewanee	1	–	4	–	0	4	–	4	–	1
Mississippi A&M	1	–	4	–	0	3	–	4	–	1
VMI	1	–	5	–	0	5	–	5	–	0
LSU	0	–	2	–	1	5	–	3	–	1
NC State	0	–	4	–	1	3	–	5	–	1
Ole Miss	0	–	4	–	0	5	–	5	–	0
Clemson	0	–	4	–	0	1	–	7	–	0
Maryland	0	–	4	–	0	2	–	5	–	1
+ – Conference co-champions; Rankings from Dickinson System

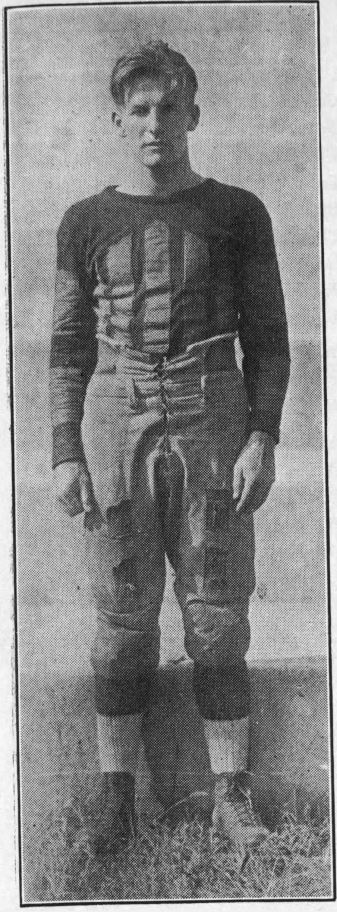
Team captain Paul Caldwell

The 1925 VMI Keydets football team was an American football team that represented the Virginia Military Institute (VMI) during the 1925 college football season as a member of the Southern Conference. In their sixth year under head coach Blandy Clarkson, the team compiled an overall record of 5–5.

== Schedule ==
Date	Opponent	Site	Result	Source
September 19	Wofford*	Alumni Field; Lexington, VA	W 9–0	
September 26	Emory & Henry*	Alumni Field; Lexington, VA	W 46–0	
October 2	at Georgia Tech	Grant Field; Atlanta, GA	L 0–33	
October 10	Roanoke*	Alumni Field; Lexington, VA	W 17–14	
October 17	at Virginia	Lambeth Field; Charlottesville, VA	L 10–18	
October 24	vs. NC State	Mayo Park; Richmond, VA	W 27–6	
October 31	Lynchburg*	Alumni Field; Lexington, VA	W 33–0	
November 7	vs. North Carolina	Mayo Park; Richmond, VA	L 11–23	
November 14	vs. Kentucky	Laidley Field; Charleston, WV	L 0–7	
November 26	vs. VPI	Maher Field; Roanoke, VA (rivalry)	L 0–7	
*Non-conference game
