= 1925 Georgia Bulldogs football team =

American college football season

1925 Georgia Bulldogs football
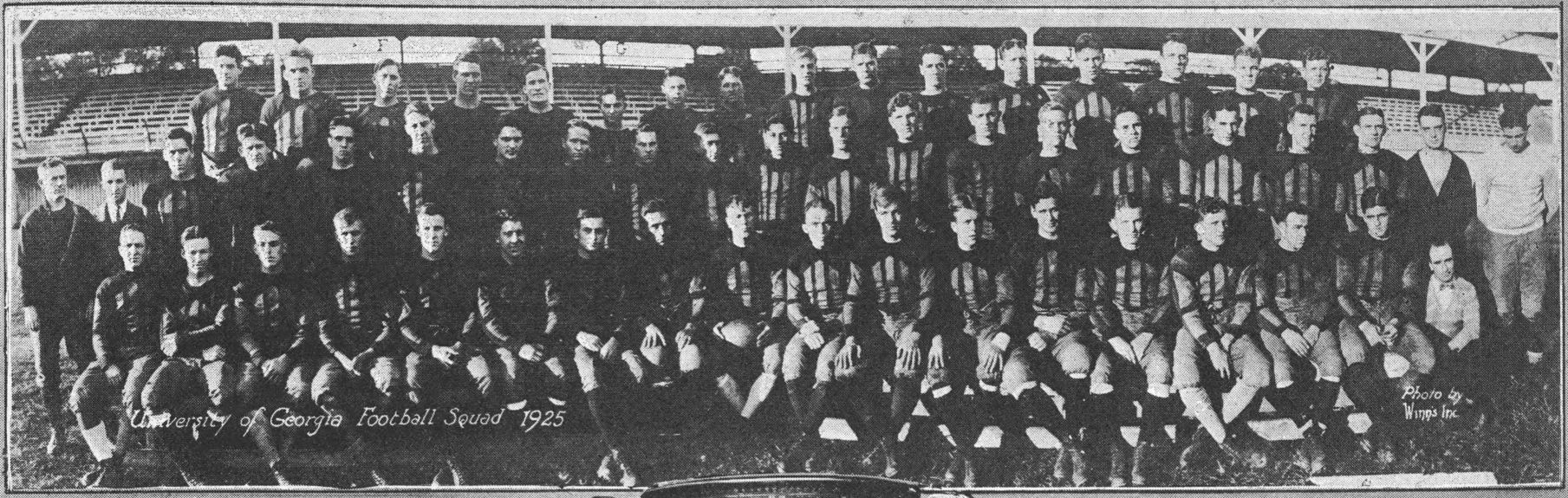
- Conference: Southern Conference
- Record: 4–5 (2–4 SoCon)
- Head coach: George Cecil Woodruff (3rd season)
- Captain: Smack Thompson
- Home stadium: Sanford Field

1925 Southern Conference football standings
	Conf.					Overall
Team	W		L		T	W		L		T
No. 2 Alabama +	7	–	0	–	0	10	–	0	–	0
No. 6 Tulane +	5	–	0	–	0	9	–	0	–	1
North Carolina	4	–	0	–	1	7	–	1	–	1
Washington and Lee	5	–	1	–	0	5	–	5	–	0
Virginia	4	–	1	–	1	7	–	1	–	1
Georgia Tech	4	–	1	–	1	6	–	2	–	1
Kentucky	4	–	2	–	0	6	–	3	–	0
Florida	3	–	2	–	0	8	–	2	–	0
Auburn	3	–	2	–	1	5	–	3	–	1
VPI	3	–	3	–	1	5	–	3	–	2
Vanderbilt	3	–	3	–	0	6	–	3	–	0
Tennessee	2	–	2	–	1	5	–	2	–	1
South Carolina	2	–	2	–	0	7	–	3	–	0
Georgia	2	–	4	–	0	4	–	5	–	0
Sewanee	1	–	4	–	0	4	–	4	–	1
Mississippi A&M	1	–	4	–	0	3	–	4	–	1
VMI	1	–	5	–	0	5	–	5	–	0
LSU	0	–	2	–	1	5	–	3	–	1
NC State	0	–	4	–	1	3	–	5	–	1
Ole Miss	0	–	4	–	0	5	–	5	–	0
Clemson	0	–	4	–	0	1	–	7	–	0
Maryland	0	–	4	–	0	2	–	5	–	1
+ – Conference co-champions; Rankings from Dickinson System

The 1925 Georgia Bulldogs football team was an American football team that represented the University of Georgia as a member of the Southern Conference during the 1925 season. In its third season under head coach George Cecil Woodruff, Georgia compiled a 4–5 season (2–4 against conference opponents) and outscored opponents by a total of 133 to 91. Smack Thompson was the team captain. The team played its home games at Sanford Field in Athens, Georgia.

The 1925 season was George Cecil Woodruff's only losing season during his five-year tenure as Georgia's head coach. In 1925, Georgia played Georgia Tech for the first time since 1916, losing 3–0 in Atlanta.

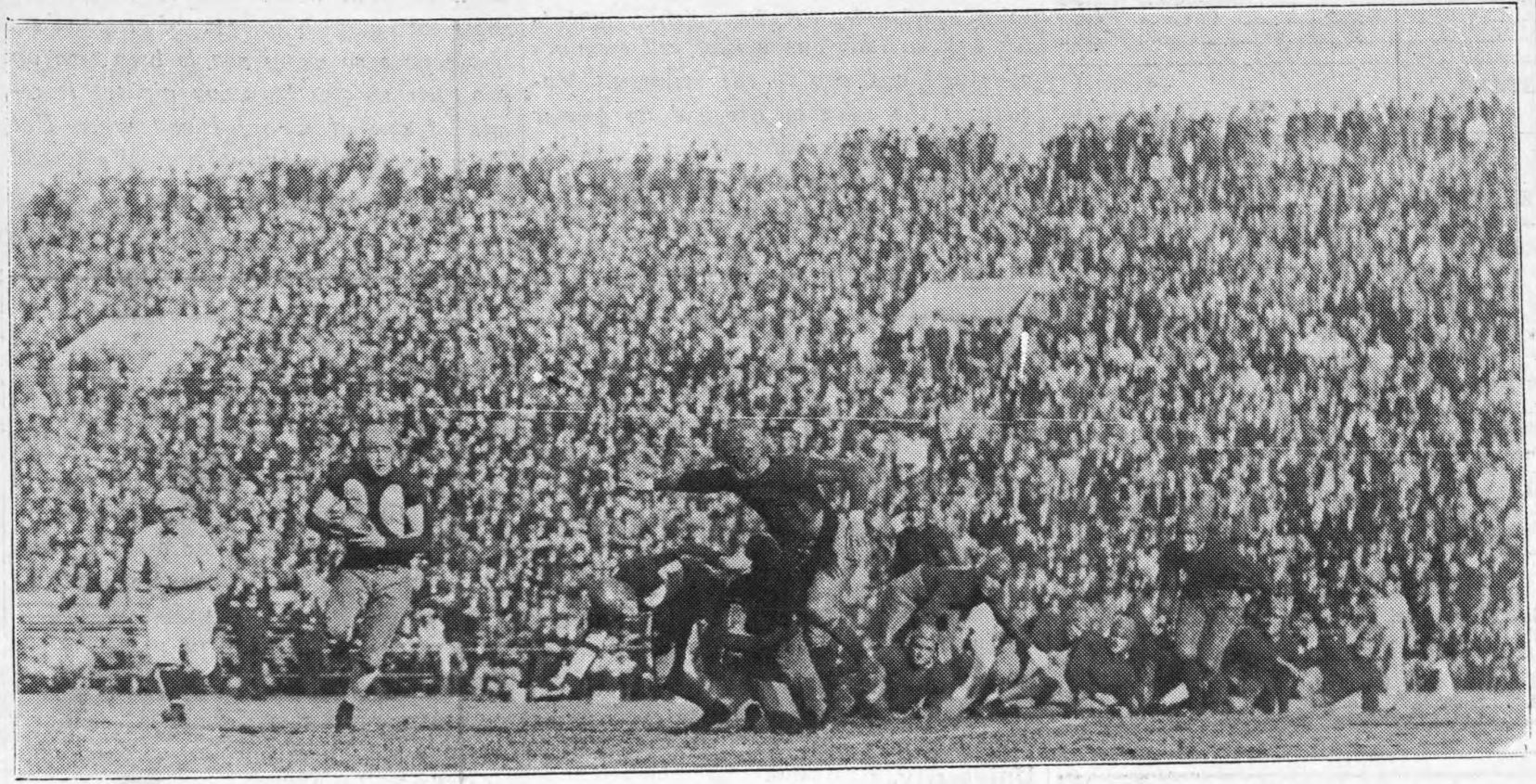
Georgia Tech's Doug Wycoff rushes with the ball during their November 14 game

== Schedule ==
Date	Opponent	Site	Result	Attendance	Source
September 26	at Mercer*	Centennial Stadium; Macon, GA	W 32–0		
October 3	Virginia	Sanford Field; Athens, GA	L 6–7		
October 10	at Yale*	Yale Bowl; New Haven, CT	L 7–35		
October 17	vs. Furman*	Academy Field; Augusta, GA	W 21–0	5,000	
October 24	Vanderbilt^{†}	Sanford Field; Athens, GA (rivalry)	W 26–7	7,000	
October 31	at Tennessee	Shields–Watkins Field; Knoxville, TN (rivalry)	L 7–12		
November 7	vs. Auburn	A. J. McClung Memorial Stadium; Columbus, GA (rivalry)	W 34–0	10,000	
November 14	at Georgia Tech	Grant Field; Atlanta, GA (rivalry)	L 0–3	33,000	
November 26	at Alabama	Rickwood Field; Birmingham, AL (rivalry)	L 0–27		
*Non-conference game; ^{†}Homecoming
