= Milton Levy =

American football player (1903–1958)

No. 19 – Tulane Green Wave
- Positions: Guard, center

Personal information
- Born: December 22, 1903; New Orleans, Louisiana, U.S.
- Died: April 26, 1958 (aged 54); New Orleans, Louisiana, U.S.

Career information
- College: Tulane (1923–1925)

Awards and highlights
- SoCon championship (1925); All-Southern (1925); Second-team All-American (1925); New York Sun All-Time Tulane team; Tulane Athletics Hall of Fame

Milton Lambert "Irish" Levy (December 22, 1903 – April 26, 1958) was an American football guard for the Tulane Green Wave of Tulane University. He was twice selected All-Southern, and once selected second-team All-American by The New York Times. Levy was selected for the New York Sun's All-Time Tulane team and inducted into the Tulane Hall Of Fame ("the T Club") in 1986.

== Early life ==
Milton Lambert Levy was born on December 22, 1903, in New Orleans, Louisiana, to Lazare Levy and Isabelle G. Cain.

=== Tulane University ===
Levy was a prominent guard for the Tulane Green Wave football team of Tulane University, and is considered one of the greatest ever to play for the school.

==== 1925 ====
The 1925 team were undefeated and claimed a Southern Conference championship. Levy was never taken out of a game for an injury during his playing career. He was the only lineman lost for the 1926 season, but assisted his alma mater as a coach that year.
