= J. G. Lowe =

American football player and coach (1903–1986)

Biographical details
- Born: June 24, 1903
- Died: September 1986; Knoxville, Tennessee, U.S.

Playing career
- 1922–1925: Tennessee
- Position: End

Coaching career (HC unless noted)
- 1926–1927: Tennessee HS (TN)
- 1928–1929: King
- 1930: The Citadel (assistant)

Head coaching record
- Overall: 8–9 (college)

Accomplishments and honors

Awards
- Third-team All-American (1925); All-Southern (1925)

Jesse Grant Lowe Jr. (June 24, 1903 – September 1986) was an American football player and coach. He played college football as an End as the University of Tennessee and was captain of the 1924 and 1925 teams. Lowe served as the head football coach at King University in Bristol, Tennessee for two seasons, from 1928 to 1929.

== Early years ==
Grant's father, Jesse Grant Lowe, was a teacher.

== College football ==
Lowe was an end on M. B. Banks's Tennessee Volunteers of the University of Tennessee, captain of both the 1924 and 1925 teams. His first three years he played next to Estes Kefauver on the line. Lowe was the last to be elected captain of the football team in consecutive years until 2004. Lowe and his three brothers (Andy Lowe, Chink Lowe, and Ted Lowe) all played for Tennessee. J. G. was selected All-Southern in 1925, an honor predicted by his brother. "Chink" once wrote "We practiced pretty hard today...The boys showed great improvement over yesterday, so I am somewhat encouraged. . . . J.G. showed up good today and although he doesn't know it all, he seems sure of making the team. I believe he will run some one a good race for All Southern." J. G. was also selected a third-team All-American in 1925.

== Coaching career ==
Lowe began his coaching career at Tennessee High School in Bristol, Tennessee in 1926. He left Tennessee High in June 1928 to become head coach at King University, also in Bristol. Lowe was succeeded by fellow Tennessee alumnus John Barnhill at Tennessee High. In 1930, Lowe moved on to The Citadel in Charleston, South Carolina to assist Johnny Floyd, who had been hired as the school's new head football coach.

== Personal life ==
Lowe married Dorothy Montague Sevier on December 6, 1931, in Hendersonville, North Carolina.

== Head coaching record ==
=== College ===
| Year | Team | Overall | Conference | Standing | Bowl/playoffs |
|---|---|---|---|---|---|
King Tornado (Smoky Mountain Conference) (1928–1929)
| 1928 | King | 3–5 | 2–3 | 4th | |
| 1929 | King | 5–4 | 2–3 | 4th | |
| King: | | 8–9 | 4–6 | | |
| Total: | | 8–9 | | | |
