= Miles Field (Virginia Tech) =

Athletics venue in Blacksburg, Virginia

- Former names: Sheib Field (1894–1902); Gibboney Field (1902–1909)
- Location: Blacksburg, Virginia
- Owner: Virginia Tech

Construction
- Opened: 1894

Miles Field was an outdoor athletics venue of Virginia Agricultural and Mechanical College and Polytechnic Institute in Blacksburg, Virginia. It was in use from 1894 to 1926, hosting football, baseball, and track events.

== History ==
University president John McLaren McBryde designated part of an horticulture farm known as Sheib Field for athletic and military drill use in 1894. In 1902, a grandstand was built and the name changed to Gibboney Field. The area was graded and leveled, grandstand enlarged, and then renamed as Miles Field in 1909.

Miles Field was succeeded with the completion of Miles Stadium in 1926.
