= 1926 Southern Conference football season =

- League: NCAA
- Sport: College football
- Duration: September 18, 1926 through January 1, 1927
- Teams: 22

Regular Season
- Season champions: Alabama

Football seasons
- ← 1925 1927 →

1926 Southern Conference football standings
	Conf.					Overall
Team	W		L		T	W		L		T
No. 7 Alabama $	8	–	0	–	0	9	–	0	–	1
Tennessee	5	–	1	–	0	8	–	1	–	0
Vanderbilt	4	–	1	–	0	8	–	1	–	0
South Carolina	4	–	2	–	0	6	–	4	–	0
Georgia	4	–	2	–	0	5	–	4	–	0
Virginia	4	–	2	–	1	6	–	2	–	2
VPI	3	–	2	–	1	5	–	3	–	1
Washington and Lee	3	–	2	–	1	4	–	3	–	2
Georgia Tech	4	–	3	–	0	4	–	5	–	0
North Carolina	3	–	3	–	0	4	–	5	–	0
Auburn	3	–	3	–	0	5	–	4	–	0
LSU	3	–	3	–	0	6	–	3	–	0
Ole Miss	2	–	2	–	0	5	–	4	–	0
Mississippi A&M	2	–	3	–	0	5	–	4	–	0
VMI	2	–	4	–	0	5	–	5	–	0
Tulane	2	–	4	–	0	3	–	5	–	1
Maryland	1	–	3	–	1	5	–	4	–	1
Clemson	1	–	3	–	0	2	–	7	–	0
Florida	1	–	4	–	1	2	–	6	–	2
Kentucky	1	–	4	–	1	2	–	6	–	1
NC State	0	–	4	–	0	4	–	6	–	0
Sewanee	0	–	5	–	0	2	–	6	–	0
$ – Conference champion; Rankings from Dickinson System

The 1926 Southern Conference football season was the college football games played by the member schools of the Southern Conference as part of the 1926 college football season. The season began on September 18.

In the annual Rose Bowl game, the SoCon champion Alabama Crimson Tide tied the PCC champion, and #1 ranked team under the Dickinson System, Stanford 7–7. Alabama and Stanford therefore were amongst those named a national champion. Alabama guard Fred Pickhard was the Rose Bowl game's MVP.

Robert Neyland was hired to coach Tennessee in 1926 by Nathan Dougherty with the explicit goal to "even the score with Vanderbilt."

== Season overview ==
=== Results and team statistics ===
Conf. Rank	Team	Head coach	Overall record	Conf. record	PPG	PAG
1	Alabama	Wallace Wade	9–0–1	8–0	24.9	**2.7**
2	Vanderbilt	Dan McGugin	8–1	4–1	**26.8**	4.7
3	Tennessee	Robert Neyland	8–1	5–1	16.8	3.8
4 (tie)	South Carolina	Branch Bocock	5–4	4–2	15.9	6.2
4 (tie)	Georgia	Kid Woodruff	4–5	2–4	15.0	12.8
6	Virginia	Greasy Neale	6–2–1	4–2–1	16.1	5.3
7 (tie)	VPI	Andy Gustafson	5–3–1	3–2–1	14.9	8.9
7 (tie)	Washington and Lee	Pat Herron	4–3–2	3–2–1	10.3	10.4
9	Georgia Tech	William Alexander	4–5	4–3	9.7	9.7
10 (tie)	LSU	Mike Donahue	6–3	3–3	14.2	5.0
10 (tie)	Auburn	Dave Morey	5–4	3–3	13.6	9.4
10 (tie)	North Carolina	Chuck Collins	4–5	3–3	6.6	8.2
10 (tie)	Ole Miss	Homer Hazel	5–4	2–2	12.6	12.2
14	Mississippi A&M	Bernie Bierman	5–4	2–3	14.9	10.9
15 (tie)	VMI	Blandy Clarkson	5–5	2–4	8.0	9.8
15 (tie)	Tulane	Clark Shaughnessy	3–5–1	2–4	7.9	6.7
17	Maryland	Curley Byrd	5–4–1	1–3–1	16.1	9.3
18	Clemson	Bud Saunders	2–7	1–3	2.2	18.8
19 (tie)	Florida	Tom Sebring	2–6–2	1–4–1	9.4	13.6
19 (tie)	Kentucky	Fred Murphy	2–6–1	1–4–1	9.3	10.1
20	NC State	Gus Tebell	4–6	0–4	6.6	10.2
21	Sewanee	M. S. Bennett	2–6	0–5	9.1	8.4

Key

PPG = Average of points scored per game
PAG = Average of points allowed per game

=== Regular season ===
Index to colors and formatting
Non-conference matchup; SoCon member won
Non-conference matchup; SoCon member lost
Non-conference matchup; tie
Conference matchup

SoCon teams in bold.

==== Week One ====
Date	Visiting team	Home team	Site	Result	Attendance	Reference
September 18	Erskine	**Clemson**	Riggs Field • Calhoun, South Carolina	**W** 7–0		
September 18	Wofford	**VMI**	Alumni Field • Lexington, Virginia	**W** 20–0		

==== Week Two ====
Date	Visiting team	Home team	Site	Result	Attendance	Reference
September 24	Millsaps	**Alabama**	Denny Field • Tuscaloosa, Alabama	**W** 54–0	4,000	
September 24	Elon	**NC State**	Riddick Stadium • Raleigh, North Carolina	**W** 13–0		
September 25	Chattanooga	**Auburn**	Drake Field • Auburn, Alabama	**W** 15–6		
September 25	Southern College	**Florida**	Fleming Field • Gainesville, Florida	**W** 16–0		
September 25	Presbyterian	**Clemson**	Riggs Field • Calhoun, South Carolina	**L** 14–0		
September 25	Mercer	**Georgia**	Sanford Field • Athens, Georgia	**W** 20–0	4,500	
September 25	Oglethorpe	**Georgia Tech**	Grant Field • Atlanta, Georgia	**L** 7–6	10,000	
September 25	Louisiana Normal	**LSU**	Tiger Stadium • Baton Rouge, Louisiana	**W** 47–0		
September 25	Washington College	**Maryland**	Byrd Stadium • College Park, Maryland	**W** 63–0		
September 25	Jonesboro A&M	**Ole Miss**	Hemingway Stadium • Oxford, Mississippi	**W** 28–0		
September 25	**Mississippi A&M**	Birmingham–Southern	Munger Bowl • Birmingham, Alabama	**W** 19–7		
September 25	**North Carolina**	Wake Forest	Gore Athletic Field • Wake Forest, North Carolina	**L** 6–0	8,000	
September 25	Bryson College	**Sewanee**	Hardee Field • Sewanee, Tennessee	**W** 15–6		
September 25	Erskine	**South Carolina**	Melton Field • Columbia, South Carolina	**W** 41–0		
September 25	Carson–Newman	**Tennessee**	Shields–Watkins Field • Knoxville, Tennessee	**W** 13–0		
September 25	Louisiana Tech	**Tulane**	Tulane Stadium • New Orleans, Louisiana	**W** 40–0	7,000	
September 25	Middle Tennessee State Teachers	**Vanderbilt**	Dudley Field • Nashville, Tennessee	**W** 69–0		
September 25	Hampden–Sydney	**Virginia**	Lambeth Field • Charlottesville, Virginia	**T** 0–0		
September 25	Richmond	**VMI**	Alumni Field • Lexington, Virginia	**W** 10–0		
September 25	Roanoke	**VPI**	Miles Stadium • Blacksburg, Virginia	**W** 47–0		
September 25	Lynchburg	**Washington & Lee**	Wilson Field • Lexington, Virginia	**W** 35–0		

==== Week Three ====
Date	Visiting team	Home team	Site	Result	Attendance	Reference
October 2	**Alabama**	**Vanderbilt**	Dudley Field • Nashville, Tennessee	**ALA** 19–7	16,000	
October 2	**Clemson**	**Auburn**	Drake Field • Auburn, Alabama	**AUB** 47–0		
October 2	**Florida**	Chicago	Stagg Field • Chicago, Illinois	**L** 12–6	30,000	
October 2	**VMI**	**Georgia Tech**	Grant Field • Atlanta, Georgia	**GT** 13–0		
October 2	Maryville (TN)	**Kentucky**	Stoll Field • Lexington, Kentucky	**W** 25–0		
October 2	Southwestern Louisiana	**LSU**	Tiger Stadium • Baton Rouge, Louisiana	**W** 34–0		
October 2	**Ole Miss**	Arkansas	The Hill • Fayetteville, Arkansas	**L** 21–6		
October 2	Mississippi College	**Mississippi A&M**	Scott Field • Starkville, Mississippi	**W** 41–0		
October 2	**Maryland**	**South Carolina**	Melton Field • Columbia, South Carolina	**SCAR** 12–0		
October 2	Furman	**NC State**	Riddick Stadium • Raleigh, North Carolina	**L** 31–0		
October 2	Middle Tennessee State Teachers	**Sewanee**	Hardee Field • Sewanee, Tennessee	**W** 48–0		
October 2	**North Carolina**	**Tennessee**	Shields–Watkins Field • Knoxville, Tennessee	**TENN** 34–0		
October 2	**Tulane**	Missouri	Memorial Stadium • Columbia, Missouri	**T** 6–6		
October 2	**Georgia**	**Virginia**	Lambeth Field • Charlottesville, Virginia	**UGA** 27–7		
October 2	Hampden–Sydney	**VPI**	Miles Stadium • Blacksburg, Virginia	**W** 30–0		
October 2	**Washington & Lee**	West Virginia	Laidley Field • Charleston, West Virginia	**L** 18–0		

==== Week Four ====
Date	Visiting team	Home team	Site	Result	Attendance	Reference
October 9	**Alabama**	**Mississippi A&M**	Meridian Fairgrounds • Meridian, Mississippi	**ALA** 26–7		
October 9	**Auburn**	Howard (AL)	Rickwood Field • Birmingham, Alabama	**W** 33–14		
October 9	**NC State**	**Clemson**	Riggs Field • Calhoun, South Carolina	**CLEM** 7–3		
October 9	**Florida**	**Ole Miss**	Hemingway Stadium • Oxford, Mississippi	**MISS** 12–7		
October 9	**Georgia**	Yale	Yale Bowl • New Haven, Connecticut	**L** 19–0		
October 9	**Tulane**	**Georgia Tech**	Grant Field • Atlanta, Georgia	**GT** 9–6		
October 9	**Kentucky**	Indiana	Memorial Stadium • Bloomington, Indiana	**L** 14–6		
October 9	**Tennessee**	**LSU**	Tiger Stadium • Baton Rouge, Louisiana	**TENN** 14–7		
October 9	**Maryland**	Chicago	Stagg Field • Chicago, Illinois	**L** 21–0	35,000	
October 9	**South Carolina**	**North Carolina**	Emerson Field • Chapel Hill, North Carolina	**UNC** 7–0		
October 9	**Sewanee**	Texas A&M	Fair Park Stadium • Dallas, Texas	**L** 6–3		
October 9	Bryson College	**Vanderbilt**	Dudley Field • Nashville, Tennessee	**W** 48–0		
October 9	Lynchburg	**Virginia**	Lambeth Field • Charlottesville, Virginia	**W** 38–0		
October 9	**VPI**	Dartmouth	Memorial Field • Hanover, New Hampshire	**L** 20–0		
October 9	Roanoke	**VMI**	Alumni Field • Lexington, Virginia	**L** 13–7		
October 9	**Washington & Lee**	Princeton	Palmer Stadium • Princeton, New Jersey	**T** 7–7		

==== Week Five ====
Date	Visiting team	Home team	Site	Result	Attendance	Reference
October 15	Wofford	**South Carolina**	Melton Field • Columbia, South Carolina	**W** 27–13		
October 15	Maryville (TN)	**Tennessee**	Shields–Watkins Field • Knoxville, Tennessee	**W** 6–0		
October 16	**Alabama**	**Georgia Tech**	Grant Field • Atlanta, Georgia	**ALA** 21–0	20,000	
October 16	**LSU**	**Auburn**	Cramton Bowl • Montgomery, Alabama	**LSU** 10–0		
October 16	**Florida**	Mercer	Centennial Stadium • Macon, GA	**L** 6–3	6,000	
October 16	Furman	**Georgia**	Sanford Field • Athens, Georgia	**L** 14–7		
October 16	**VPI**	**Maryland**	League Park • Norfolk, Virginia	**VPI** 24–8	12,000	
October 16	Loyola (IL)	**Ole Miss**	Hemingway Stadium • Oxford, Mississippi	**W** 13–7		
October 16	Millsaps	**Mississippi A&M**	Scott Field • Starkville, Mississippi	**W** 34–0		
October 16	Duke	**North Carolina**	Emerson Field • Chapel Hill, North Carolina	**W** 6–0		
October 16	Davidson	**NC State**	Riddick Stadium • Raleigh, North Carolina	**L** 3–0		
October 16	**Tulane**	NYU	Yankee Stadium • Bronx, New York	**L** 0–21	25,000	
October 16	**Vanderbilt**	Texas	Fair Park Stadium • Dallas, Texas	**W** 7–0		
October 16	**Virginia**	**VMI**	Alumni Field • Lexington, Virginia	**UVA** 14–7		
October 16	**Washington & Lee**	**Kentucky**	Stoll Field • Lexington, Kentucky	**W&L** 14–13		

==== Week Six ====
Date	Visiting team	Home team	Site	Result	Attendance	Reference
October 21	**Clemson**	South Carolina	State Fairgrounds • Columbia, South Carolina	**SCAR** 24–0	12,000	
October 23	**Sewanee**	Alabama	Rickwood Field • Birmingham, Alabama	**ALA** 2–0		
October 23	**Auburn**	Tulane	Tulane Stadium • New Orleans, Louisiana	**AUB** 2–0		
October 23	**Kentucky**	Florida	Durkee Field • Jacksonville, Florida	**UK** 18–13		
October 23	**Washington & Lee**	Georgia Tech	Grant Field • Atlanta, Georgia	**GT** 19–7		
October 23	**Mississippi A&M**	LSU	State Fairgrounds • Jackson, Mississippi	**MSA&M** 7–6		
October 23	**North Carolina**	Maryland	Byrd Stadium • College Park, Maryland	**MD** 14–6	3,500	
October 23	Centre	Tennessee	Shields–Watkins Field • Knoxville, Tennessee	**W** 30–7		
October 23	**Georgia**	Vanderbilt	Dudley Field • Nashville, Tennessee	**VAN** 14–13		
October 23	**NC State**	VMI	Tate Field • Richmond, Virginia	**VMI** 7–0		
October 23	**Virginia**	VPI	Miles Stadium • Blacksburg, Virginia	**VPI** 6–0		

==== Week Seven ====
Date	Visiting team	Home team	Site	Result	Attendance	Reference
October 28	**South Carolina**	The Citadel	County Fairgrounds • Orangeburg, South Carolina	**L** 12–9		
October 28	**Clemson**	Wofford	Snyder Field • Spartanburg, South Carolina	**L** 3–0		
October 30	**LSU**	**Alabama**	Denny Field • Tuscaloosa, Alabama	**ALA** 24–0		
October 30	**Sewanee**	**Auburn**	Cramton Bowl • Montgomery, Alabama	**AUB** 9–0		
October 30	**Florida**	**Georgia**	Sanford Field • Athens, Georgia	**UGA** 32–9		
October 30	**Georgia Tech**	Notre Dame	Cartier Field • South Bend, Indiana	**L** 12–0	11,000	
October 30	Gallaudet	**Maryland**	Byrd Stadium • College Park, Maryland	**W** 38–7		
October 30	**Ole Miss**	**Tulane**	Tulane Stadium • New Orleans, Louisiana	**TUL** 6–0		
October 30	**Tennessee**	**Mississippi A&M**	Scott Field • Starkville, Mississippi	**TENN** 33–0		
October 30	**NC State**	**North Carolina**	Emerson Field • Chapel Hill, North Carolina	**UNC** 12–0		
October 30	**VPI**	**Kentucky**	Stoll Field • Lexington, Kentucky	**T** 13–13		
October 30	**Virginia**	**South Carolina**	Melton Field • Columbia, South Carolina	**UVA** 6–0		
October 30	Southwestern (TN)	**Vanderbilt**	Dudley Field • Nashville, Tennessee	**W** 50–0		
October 30	Davidson	**VMI**	Lynchburg, Virginia	**W** 12–7		

==== Week Eight ====
Date	Visiting team	Home team	Site	Result	Attendance	Reference
November 6	**Kentucky**	**Alabama**	Rickwood Field • Birmingham, Alabama	**ALA** 14–0		
November 6	**Auburn**	**Georgia**	McClung Stadium • Columbus, Georgia	**UGA** 16–6		
November 6	**Clemson**	**Florida**	Fleming Field • Gainesville, Florida	**FLA** 33–0		
November 6	**Vanderbilt**	**Georgia Tech**	Grant Field • Atlanta, Georgia	**VAN** 13–7		
November 6	Arkansas	**LSU**	State Fair Stadium • Shreveport, Louisiana	**W** 14–0		
November 6	**Maryland**	Yale	Yale Bowl • New Haven, Connecticut	**W** 15–0		
November 6	**Ole Miss**	Southwestern (TN)	Fargason Field • Memphis, Tennessee	**W** 32–27		
November 6	**Mississippi A&M**	**Tulane**	Tulane Stadium • New Orleans, Louisiana	**MSA&M** 14–0		
November 6	**VMI**	**North Carolina**	Emerson Field • Chapel Hill, North Carolina	**UNC** 28–0		
November 6	Lenoir–Rhyne	**NC State**	Riddick Stadium • Raleigh, North Carolina	**W** 6–0		
November 6	**South Carolina**	**VPI**	Tate Field • Richmond, Virginia	**SCAR** 19–0		
November 6	**Sewanee**	**Tennessee**	Shields–Watkins Field • Knoxville, Tennessee	**TENN** 12–0		
November 6	**Washington & Lee**	**Virginia**	Lambeth Field • Charlottesville, Virginia	**UVA** 30–7		

==== Week Nine ====
Date	Visiting team	Home team	Site	Result	Attendance	Reference
November 11	Duke	**NC State**	Riddick Stadium • Raleigh, North Carolina	**W** 26–19		
November 13	**Florida**	**Alabama**	Cramton Bowl • Montgomery, Alabama	**ALA** 49–0		
November 13	Marquette	**Auburn**	Rickwood Field • Birmingham, Alabama	**L** 19–3		
November 13	The Citadel	**Clemson**	Riggs Field • Calhoun, South Carolina	**L** 15–6		
November 13	**Georgia**	**Georgia Tech**	Grant Field • Atlanta, Georgia	**UGA** 14–13		
November 13	**Kentucky**	**VMI**	Laidley Field • Charleston, West Virginia	**VMI** 10–9		
November 13	**Ole Miss**	**LSU**	Tiger Stadium • Baton Rouge, Louisiana	**LSU** 3–0		
November 13	**Mississippi A&M**	Indiana	Memorial Stadium • Bloomington, Indiana	**L** 19–6		
November 13	**North Carolina**	Davidson	Richardson Field • Davidson, North Carolina	**L** 10–0		
November 13	Furman	**South Carolina**	Melton Field • Columbia, South Carolina	**L** 10–7		
November 13	**Tennessee**	**Vanderbilt**	Dudley Field • Nashville, Tennessee	**VAN** 20–3		
November 13	**Sewanee**	**Tulane**	Tulane Stadium • New Orleans, Louisiana	**TUL** 19–7		
November 13	**Virginia**	**Maryland**	Byrd Stadium • College Park, Maryland	**T** 6–6		
November 13	**VPI**	**Washington & Lee**	Municipal Stadium • Lynchburg, Virginia	**W&L** 13–0		

==== Week Ten ====
Date	Visiting team	Home team	Site	Result	Attendance	Reference
November 20	Centre	**Kentucky**	Stoll Field • Lexington, Kentucky	**L** 7–0		
November 20	**NC State**	**South Carolina**	Melton Field • Columbia, South Carolina	**SCAR** 20–14		
November 20	Randolph–Macon	**Virginia**	Lambeth Field • Charlottesville, Virginia	**W** 57–0		
November 20	**Maryland**	**Washington & Lee**	Wilson Field • Lexington, Virginia	**W&L** 3–0		

==== Week Eleven ====
Date	Visiting team	Home team	Site	Result	Attendance	Reference
November 23	**North Carolina**	**Virginia**	Lambeth Field • Charlottesville, Virginia	**UVA** 3–0		
November 25	**Georgia**	**Alabama**	Rickwood Field • Birmingham, Alabama	**ALA** 33–6	17,000	
November 25	**Auburn**	**Georgia Tech**	Grant Field • Atlanta, Georgia	**GT** 20–7		
November 25	**Clemson**	Furman	Manly Field • Greenville, South Carolina	**L** 30–0		
November 25	**LSU**	**Tulane**	Tulane Stadium • New Orleans, Louisiana	**LSU** 7–0		
November 25	**Washington & Lee**	**Florida**	Durkee Field • Jacksonville, Florida	**T** 7–7		
November 25	**Maryland**	Johns Hopkins	Baltimore Stadium • Baltimore, Maryland	**W** 17–14		
November 25	**Ole Miss**	**Mississippi A&M**	Scott Field • Starkville, Mississippi	**MISS** 7–6		
November 25	**Kentucky**	**Tennessee**	Shields–Watkins Field • Knoxville, Tennessee	**TENN** 6–0		
November 25	**Sewanee**	**Vanderbilt**	Dudley Field • Nashville, Tennessee	**TENN** 6–0		
November 25	**VMI**	**VPI**	Maher Field • Roanoke, Virginia	**VPI** 14–7		
November 27	Wake Forest	**NC State**	Riddick Stadium • Raleigh, North Carolina	**W** 7–3	11,000	

=== Postseason ===
==== Bowl games ====
Date	Bowl Game	Site	SIAA Team	Opponent	Score
January 1, 1927	Rose Bowl	Rose Bowl • Pasadena, California	**Alabama**	Stanford	**T** 7–7

== Awards and honors ==
=== All-Americans ===
- E – Hoyt Winslett, Alabama (AP-1; INS; NEA; CP-2; NYS-2; BE-1; RWJ-2; DW-1; ES-2; BEHR)
- T – Fred Pickhard, Alabama (BE-2; BEHR)
- T – Mack Tharpe, Georgia Tech (BEHR)
- G – John Barnhill, Tennessee (BEHR)
- C – Vernon Sharpe, Vanderbilt (BEHR)
- QB – Bill Spears, Vanderbilt (AP-2; NYS-2; BE-2; RWJ-3 [as hb]; DW-2; BEHR)
- HB – Tolbert "Red" Brown, Alabama (BEHR)
- FB – Ty Rauber, Washington & Lee (AP-3; BEHR)

=== All-Southern team ===
The following is the composite All-Southern team compiled by the Associated Press.

Position	Name	First-team selectors	Team
QB	Bill Spears	AP	Vanderbilt
HB	George Morton	AP	Georgia
HB	Red Barnes	AP	Alabama
FB	Ty Rauber	AP	Washington & Lee
E	Hoyt Winslett	AP	Alabama
T	Curtis Luckey	AP	Georgia
G	Fred Pickhard	AP	Alabama
C	Gordon Holmes	AP	Alabama
G	Charles Mackall	AP	Virginia
T	John Barnhill	AP	Tennessee
E	Herschel Caldwell	AP	Alabama
