= 1926 VPI Gobblers football team =

American college football season

1926 VPI Gobblers football
- Conference: Southern Conference
- Record: 5–3–1 (3–2–1 SoCon)
- Head coach: Andy Gustafson (1st season)
- Captains: V. E. Miles; Joseph Henry Moran
- Home stadium: Miles Stadium

1926 Southern Conference football standings
	Conf.					Overall
Team	W		L		T	W		L		T
No. 7 Alabama $	8	–	0	–	0	9	–	0	–	1
Tennessee	5	–	1	–	0	8	–	1	–	0
Vanderbilt	4	–	1	–	0	8	–	1	–	0
South Carolina	4	–	2	–	0	6	–	4	–	0
Georgia	4	–	2	–	0	5	–	4	–	0
Virginia	4	–	2	–	1	6	–	2	–	2
VPI	3	–	2	–	1	5	–	3	–	1
Washington and Lee	3	–	2	–	1	4	–	3	–	2
Georgia Tech	4	–	3	–	0	4	–	5	–	0
North Carolina	3	–	3	–	0	4	–	5	–	0
Auburn	3	–	3	–	0	5	–	4	–	0
LSU	3	–	3	–	0	6	–	3	–	0
Ole Miss	2	–	2	–	0	5	–	4	–	0
Mississippi A&M	2	–	3	–	0	5	–	4	–	0
VMI	2	–	4	–	0	5	–	5	–	0
Tulane	2	–	4	–	0	3	–	5	–	1
Maryland	1	–	3	–	1	5	–	4	–	1
Clemson	1	–	3	–	0	2	–	7	–	0
Florida	1	–	4	–	1	2	–	6	–	2
Kentucky	1	–	4	–	1	2	–	6	–	1
NC State	0	–	4	–	0	4	–	6	–	0
Sewanee	0	–	5	–	0	2	–	6	–	0
$ – Conference champion; Rankings from Dickinson System

The 1926 VPI Gobblers football team represented Virginia Polytechnic Institute in the 1926 college football season. The team was led by their head coach Andy Gustafson and finished with a record of five wins, three losses and one tie (5–3–1). This was the first season played in Miles Stadium.

== Schedule ==
Date	Time	Opponent	Site	Result	Attendance	Source
September 25		Roanoke*	Miles Stadium; Blacksburg, VA	W 47–0		
October 2		Hampden–Sydney*	Miles Stadium; Blacksburg, VA	W 30–0		
October 9		at Dartmouth*	Memorial Field; Hanover, NH	L 0–21		
October 16		vs. Maryland	League Park; Norfolk, VA	W 24–8	11,000	
October 23		Virginia^{†}	Miles Stadium; Blacksburg, VA (rivalry)	W 6–0	7,000	
October 30	2:00 p.m.	at Kentucky	McLean Stadium; Lexington, KY	T 13–13	5,000	
November 6	2:30 p.m.	vs. South Carolina	Tate Field; Richmond, VA	L 0–19		
November 13	2:30 p.m.	vs. Washington and Lee	Municipal Stadium; Lynchburg, VA	L 0–13	8,000-10,000	
November 25		vs. VMI	Maher Field; Roanoke, VA (rivalry)	W 14–7	15,000	
*Non-conference game; ^{†}Homecoming; All times are in Eastern time

== Before the season ==
The 1925 VPI Gobblers football team compiled a 5–3–2 record and were led by B. C. Cubbage in his fifth season as head coach.

== Game summaries ==
=== Roanoke ===
VPI's first game of the season was a victory over Roanoke at Miles Stadium.

The starting lineup for VPI was: Nutter (left end), Moss (left tackle), Jones (left guard), Moran (center), Miles (right guard), Bailey (right tackle), Petty (right end), MacArthur (quarterback), Peake (left halfback), Tomko (right halfback), McEver (fullback). The substitutes were: Brown, Erickson, Esleeck, Fussell, Gray, Hotchkiss, Hudgins, Jacobs, Looney and Rice.

The starting lineup for Roanoke was: Charles Wilson (left end), George Marsh (left tackle), Maurice Givens (left guard), Harold Nank (center), Claudius Mitchell (right guard), Roland Sturdevant (right tackle), Milton Etris (right end), John Dietrich (quarterback), Merrill Jones (left halfback), John Miller (right halfback), Lloyd Seay (fullback). The substitutes were: W. T. "Ted" Fix, Raymond Haislip, William Logan, James Shannon and G. E. Sheppard.

=== Hampden–Sydney ===
Hampden–Sydney vs. VPI

Team	1	2	3	4	Total
HS	0	0	0	0	0
• VPI	9	7	7	7	30

- Date: October 2, 1926
- Location: Miles Stadium
  Blacksburg, VA
- Referee: Richard Carrington (UVA)

After their victory over Roanoke, VPI played Hampden–Sydney College at Miles Stadium.

The starting lineup for VPI was: Nutter (left end), Moss (left tackle), Jones (left guard), Moran (center), Miles (right guard), Bailey (right tackle), Petty (right end), MacArthur (quarterback), Peake (left halfback), Esleeck (right halfback), McEver (fullback). The substitutes were: Brown, Handy, Hotchkiss, Jacobs, Jeffries, Looney, Mahaney, Mattox and Rice.

The starting lineup for Hampden–Sydney was: Charles Turley (left end), Stuart Worden (left tackle), Robert Nance (left guard), Alfred Dudley (center), Hugh Blanton (right guard), Harry Myles (right tackle), Roberts (right end), John Brinser (quarterback), Ward Palmer (left halfback), Alfred Adkins (right halfback), William Richardson (fullback). The substitutes were: Allen, Ayres, Carter, Garrett, Hovy, Ruffner and Savage.

=== Dartmouth ===
VPI at Dartmouth

Team	1	2	3	4	Total
VPI	0	0	0	0	0
• Dartmouth	0	14	0	7	21

- Date: October 9, 1926
- Location: Memorial Field
  Hanover, NH
- Referee: W. R. Crowley (Bowdoin)

The starting lineup for VPI was: Petty (left end), Moss (left tackle), Miles (left guard), Moran (center), Jones (right guard), Bailey (right tackle), Nutter (right end), MacArthur (quarterback), Esleeck (left halfback), Peake (right halfback), McEver (fullback).

The starting lineup for Dartmouth was: Jim Picken (left end), Hardy (left tackle), Phillips (left guard), Davis (center), Rubin (right guard), Langdell (right tackle), Cole (right end), Edwin B. Dooley (quarterback), Myles Lane (left halfback), MacPhail (right halfback), Horton (fullback). The substitutes were: Black, Breihut and John C. McAvoy.

=== Maryland ===
Maryland vs. VPI

Team	1	2	3	4	Total
Maryland	2	0	0	6	8
• VPI	7	10	7	0	24

- Date: October 16, 1926
- Location: League Park
  Norfolk, VA
- Game attendance: 11,000
- Referee: Ernest C. Quigley

The starting lineup for VPI was: Petty (left end), Brown (left tackle), Miles (left guard), Moran (center), Jones (right guard), Bailey (right tackle), Nutter (right end), MacArthur (quarterback), Esleeck (left halfback), Peake (right halfback), McEver (fullback). The substitutes were: Anderson, Handy, Jacobs, Looney, Mattox, Moss and Rice.

The starting lineup for Maryland was: Donald Adams (left end), Earl Zulick (left tackle), Arthur Wondrack (left guard), Harold Bafford (center), Omar D. Crothers Jr. (right guard), John Leatherman (right tackle), Jack Keenan (right end), Gordon Kessler (quarterback), Fred Linkous (left halfback), Myron Stevens (right halfback), Lewis "Knocky" Thomas (fullback). The substitutes were: Arthur Boyd, Gil Dent, Frederick Herzog, John Parson, Pugh, Edwin Rothgeb, Floyd Schrader, Gerald Snyder and Winterberg.

=== Virginia ===
Virginia vs. VPI

Team	1	2	3	4	Total
UVA	0	0	0	0	0
• VPI	6	0	0	0	6

- Date: October 23, 1926
- Location: Miles Stadium
  Blacksburg, VA
- Game attendance: 7,000
- Referee: Ernest C. Quigley

The starting lineup for VPI was: Petty (left end), Brown (left tackle), Miles (left guard), Moran (center), Jones (right guard), Bailey (right tackle), Nutter (right end), MacArthur (quarterback), Peake (left halfback), Esleeck (right halfback), McEver (fullback).

The starting lineup for Virginia was: McCaferty (left end), William Luke (left tackle), Charles Mackall (left guard), Theodore Phillips (center), Joseph Finck (right guard), Garland Daniel (right tackle), Samuel Friedburg (right end), John Hushion (quarterback), Curtis Cuddy (left halfback), William Ahner (right halfback), Quintus Hutter (fullback).

=== Kentucky ===
VPI at Kentucky

Team	1	2	3	4	Total
VPI	0	7	6	0	13
Kentucky	7	0	0	6	13

- Date: October 30, 1926
- Location: McLean Stadium
  Lexington, KY
- Game start: 2:00 p.m.
- Game attendance: 5,000
- Game weather: Drizzling rain
- Referee: Fonsa "F.A." Lambert

The starting lineup for VPI was: Nutter (left end), Miles (left tackle), Jones (left guard), Moran (center), Bailey (right guard), Brown (right tackle), Petty (right end), MacArthur (quarterback), Peake (left halfback), Esleeck (right halfback), Looney (fullback). The substitutes were: Handy, Jacobs, Mahaney, Mattox, Moss and Rice.

The starting lineup for Kentucky was: Elmer Gilb (left end), Frank Phipps (left tackle), Sylvan Belt (left guard), Jim Pence (center), Charles Wert (right guard), Henry Portwood (right tackle), Ray Schulte (right end), Paul Jenkins (quarterback), Frank Smith (left halfback), Ray Ellis (right halfback), John Ross (fullback). The substitutes were: Ted Creech, Denver DeHaven, Adolph Edwards, Mark Franklin, James Kirkendall and Gayle Mohney.

=== South Carolina ===
South Carolina vs. VPI

Team	1	2	3	4	Total
South Carolina	0	0	0	0	0
• VPI	0	13	0	6	19

- Date: November 6, 1926
- Location: Tate Field
  Richmond, VA
- Game weather: "Balmy"
- Referee: Foster (Hampden-Sydney)

The starting lineup for VPI was: Petty (left end), Brown (left tackle), Miles (left guard), Moran (center), Jones (right guard), Bailey (right tackle), Nutter (right end), MacArthur (quarterback), Peake (left halfback), Esleeck (right halfback), Looney (fullback). The substitutes were: Handy, Jeffries, Mahaney, Mattox and Rice.

The starting lineup for South Carolina was: Samuel Burke (left end), E. Power Rogers (left tackle), Ralph Guarino (left guard), William Boyd (center), W. R. Price (right guard), Floyd Thomas (right tackle), George Keels (right end), Bill Rogers (quarterback), J. F. Cooper (left halfback), Eli Wingfield (right halfback), Robert Wimberly (fullback). The substitutes were: W. W. "Red" Swink, James Verner, Mike Windus and Harry Wolf.

=== Washington and Lee ===
Washington & Lee vs. VPI

Team	1	2	3	4	Total
• W&L	0	6	0	7	13
VPI	0	0	0	0	0

- Date: November 13, 1926
- Location: Municipal Stadium
  Lynchburg, VA
- Game start: 2:30 p.m.
- Game attendance: 8,000-10,000

The starting lineup for VPI was: Nutter (left end), Miles (left tackle), Jones (left guard), Moran (center), Bailey (right guard), Brown (right tackle), Petty (right end), MacArthur (quarterback), Esleeck (left halfback), Peake (right halfback), Looney (fullback). The substitutes were: Handy, Hotchkiss, Jeffries, Mattox and McEver.

The starting lineup for Washington and Lee was: J. E. Bailey (left end), Robert Holt (left tackle), Burnell Tips (left guard), Ira Rector (center), Henry Groop (right guard), Earl Fitzpatrick (right tackle), John Towill (right end), Eugene White (quarterback), Perry Whitlock (left halfback), William Palmer (right halfback), Ty Rauber (fullback). The substitutes were: Charles Eigelbach.

=== VMI ===
VMI vs. VPI

Team	1	2	3	4	Total
VMI	7	0	0	0	7
• VPI	14	0	0	0	14

- Date: November 25, 1926
- Location: Maher Field
  Roanoke, VA
- Game attendance: 15,000
- Game weather: "steady downpour"
- Referee: Ed Thorpe (De LaSalle)

The starting lineup for VPI was: Nutter (left end), Miles (left tackle), Jones (left guard), Moran (center), Handy (right guard), Bailey (right tackle), Petty (right end), McEver (quarterback), Peake (left halfback), Mattox (right halfback), Looney (fullback). The substitutes were: Brown, Esleeck, Jeffries and MacArthur.

The starting lineup for VMI was: John Fain (left end), Herman Kulp (left tackle), Ralph Smith (left guard), Joseph Mondy (center), Luther Hewlett (right guard), J. C. Smith (right tackle), Luther Thornhill (right end), Al Barnes (quarterback), Frank Harner (left halfback), Frank Nabers (right halfback), Carlton Walker (fullback). The substitutes were: Ferdinand Harrington, Theodric Moor, Claude Moorman, Karlyle O'Berry and Kenneth Rugh.

== After the season ==
In December 1926, the VPI players elected V. E. Miles as captain of the 1927 VPI Gobblers football team.

== Players ==
=== Roster ===
VPI 1926 roster
George Claiborne "Speck" Anderson; Albert Ewell Bailey; Joseph Murray Brown; Karl Esleeck; M. B. Fussell; John Gray; Edward Malvern Handy; Philip Smith Hotchkiss; William Coles Hudgins; J. R. Jacobs; John Mercer Jeffries; Alfred Owens Jones; J. B. Jones; John Ote Looney	Scotty MacArthur; Arthur Randolph Mahaney; Cloy Mattox; Herbert McEver; Vernon Edward Miles (Capt.); Joseph Henry Moran (Capt.); Jack Wellford Moss; Lloyd Broderick Nutter; Frank Peake; Douglas Cooper Petty; J. H. Rice; Spear; Cyril Method "Tommy" Tomko; Von Erickson

=== Monogram Club members ===
Fourteen players received monograms for their participation on the 1926 VPI team.

Player	Hometown	Notes
Albert Ewell Bailey (Capt.)	Roanoke, Virginia	
Joseph Murray Brown	Staunton, Virginia	
Karl Esleeck	Portsmouth, Virginia	Head football coach at the University of Richmond from 1948 until 1950, compiling a record of 10–18–2.
Edward Malvern Handy	Hilton Village, Virginia	
Alfred Owens Jones	Richmond, Virginia	World War II, Korean War and Vietnam War veteran (Army).
John Ote Looney	Roanoke, Virginia	
James Bushell "Scotty" MacArthur	Newport News, Virginia	Born in Greenock, Scotland.
Cloy Mattox	Leesville, Virginia	Major League Baseball catcher for the Philadelphia Athletics during the 1929 season.
Herbert McEver	Bristol, Virginia	Head football coach at VPI in 1942 and 1945, compiling a record of 9–8–1. He was also head basketball coach at VPI from 1937 to 1944, amassing a record of 49–71, and the head baseball coach from 1933 to 1939, tallying a mark of 41–72–1.
Vernon Edward Miles	Norfolk, Virginia	
Joseph Henry Moran	Radford, Virginia	
Lloyd Broderick Nutter	Blacksburg, Virginia	World War II veteran (Captain, Army).
Frank Peake	Hampton, Virginia	
Douglas Cooper Petty	Hilton Village, Virginia	

== Coaching and training staff ==
- Head coach: Andy Gustafson
- Assistant coaches
  - Line coach: Zeke Wissinger
- Manager: Samuel McDowell Martin
- Freshman head coach: Henry Redd
- Freshman Manager: John Edmund Tankard
