= 1926 South Carolina Gamecocks football team =

American college football season

1926 South Carolina Gamecocks football
- Conference: Southern Conference
- Record: 6–4 (4–2 SoCon)
- Head coach: Branch Bocock (2nd season)
- Captain: W. M. Boyd
- Home stadium: Melton Field

1926 Southern Conference football standings
	Conf.					Overall
Team	W		L		T	W		L		T
No. 7 Alabama $	8	–	0	–	0	9	–	0	–	1
Tennessee	5	–	1	–	0	8	–	1	–	0
Vanderbilt	4	–	1	–	0	8	–	1	–	0
South Carolina	4	–	2	–	0	6	–	4	–	0
Georgia	4	–	2	–	0	5	–	4	–	0
Virginia	4	–	2	–	1	6	–	2	–	2
VPI	3	–	2	–	1	5	–	3	–	1
Washington and Lee	3	–	2	–	1	4	–	3	–	2
Georgia Tech	4	–	3	–	0	4	–	5	–	0
North Carolina	3	–	3	–	0	4	–	5	–	0
Auburn	3	–	3	–	0	5	–	4	–	0
LSU	3	–	3	–	0	6	–	3	–	0
Ole Miss	2	–	2	–	0	5	–	4	–	0
Mississippi A&M	2	–	3	–	0	5	–	4	–	0
VMI	2	–	4	–	0	5	–	5	–	0
Tulane	2	–	4	–	0	3	–	5	–	1
Maryland	1	–	3	–	1	5	–	4	–	1
Clemson	1	–	3	–	0	2	–	7	–	0
Florida	1	–	4	–	1	2	–	6	–	2
Kentucky	1	–	4	–	1	2	–	6	–	1
NC State	0	–	4	–	0	4	–	6	–	0
Sewanee	0	–	5	–	0	2	–	6	–	0
$ – Conference champion; Rankings from Dickinson System

The 1926 South Carolina Gamecocks football team represented the University of South Carolina during the 1926 Southern Conference football season. Led by Branch Bocock in his second and final season as head coach, the Gamecocks compiled an overall record of 6–4 with a mark of 4–2 in conference play, tying for fourth place in the SoCon.

== Schedule ==
Date	Opponent	Site	Result	Attendance	Source
September 25	Erskine*	Melton Field; Columbia, SC	W 41–0		
October 2	Maryland	Melton Field; Columbia, SC	W 12–0		
October 9	at North Carolina	Emerson Field; Chapel Hill, NC	L 0–7		
October 15	Wofford*	Melton Field; Columbia, SC	W 27–13	4,000	
October 21	Clemson	State Fairgrounds; Columbia, SC	W 24–0	12,000	
October 28	vs. The Citadel*	County Fairgrounds; Orangeburg, SC	L 9–12		
October 30	Virginia	Melton Field; Columbia, SC	L 0–6		
November 6	vs. VPI	Tate Field; Richmond, VA	W 19–0		
November 13	Furman*	Melton Field; Columbia, SC	L 7–10		
November 20	NC State	Melton Field; Columbia, SC	W 20–14		
*Non-conference game
