= 1926 NC State Wolfpack football team =

American college football season

1926 NC State Wolfpack football
- Conference: Southern Conference
- Record: 4–6 (0–4 SoCon)
- Head coach: Gus Tebell (2nd season)
- Home stadium: Riddick Stadium

1926 Southern Conference football standings
	Conf.					Overall
Team	W		L		T	W		L		T
No. 7 Alabama $	8	–	0	–	0	9	–	0	–	1
Tennessee	5	–	1	–	0	8	–	1	–	0
Vanderbilt	4	–	1	–	0	8	–	1	–	0
South Carolina	4	–	2	–	0	6	–	4	–	0
Georgia	4	–	2	–	0	5	–	4	–	0
Virginia	4	–	2	–	1	6	–	2	–	2
VPI	3	–	2	–	1	5	–	3	–	1
Washington and Lee	3	–	2	–	1	4	–	3	–	2
Georgia Tech	4	–	3	–	0	4	–	5	–	0
North Carolina	3	–	3	–	0	4	–	5	–	0
Auburn	3	–	3	–	0	5	–	4	–	0
LSU	3	–	3	–	0	6	–	3	–	0
Ole Miss	2	–	2	–	0	5	–	4	–	0
Mississippi A&M	2	–	3	–	0	5	–	4	–	0
VMI	2	–	4	–	0	5	–	5	–	0
Tulane	2	–	4	–	0	3	–	5	–	1
Maryland	1	–	3	–	1	5	–	4	–	1
Clemson	1	–	3	–	0	2	–	7	–	0
Florida	1	–	4	–	1	2	–	6	–	2
Kentucky	1	–	4	–	1	2	–	6	–	1
NC State	0	–	4	–	0	4	–	6	–	0
Sewanee	0	–	5	–	0	2	–	6	–	0
$ – Conference champion; Rankings from Dickinson System

The 1926 NC State Wolfpack football team was an American football team that represented North Carolina State University as a member of the Southern Conference (SoCon) during the 1926 college football season. In its third season under head coach Gus Tebell, the team compiled a 4–6 record (0–4 against SoCon opponents), finished in last place in the conference, and was outscored by a total of 102 to 66.

== Schedule ==
Date	Opponent	Site	Result	Attendance	Source
September 24	Elon*	Riddick Stadium; Raleigh, NC	W 10–0		
October 2	Furman*	Riddick Stadium; Raleigh, NC	L 0–31		
October 9	at Clemson	Riggs Field; Clemson, SC	L 3–7		
October 14	Davidson*	Riddick Stadium; Raleigh, NC	L 0–3		
October 23	at VMI	Tate Field; Richmond, VA	L 0–7		
October 30	at North Carolina	Emerson Field; Chapel Hill, NC (rivalry)	L 0–12		
November 6	Lenoir–Rhyne*	Riddick Stadium; Raleigh, NC	W 6–0		
November 11	Duke*	Riddick Stadium; Raleigh, NC (rivalry)	W 26–19		
November 20	at South Carolina	Melton Field; Columbia, SC	L 14–20		
November 25	Wake Forest*	Riddick Stadium; Raleigh, NC (rivalry)	W 7–3	11,000	
*Non-conference game
