= 1926 Virginia Cavaliers football team =

American college football season

1926 Virginia Cavaliers football
- Conference: Southern Conference
- Record: 6–2–2 (4–2–1 SoCon)
- Head coach: Greasy Neale (4th season)
- Home stadium: Lambeth Field

1926 Southern Conference football standings
	Conf.					Overall
Team	W		L		T	W		L		T
No. 7 Alabama $	8	–	0	–	0	9	–	0	–	1
Tennessee	5	–	1	–	0	8	–	1	–	0
Vanderbilt	4	–	1	–	0	8	–	1	–	0
South Carolina	4	–	2	–	0	6	–	4	–	0
Georgia	4	–	2	–	0	5	–	4	–	0
Virginia	4	–	2	–	1	6	–	2	–	2
VPI	3	–	2	–	1	5	–	3	–	1
Washington and Lee	3	–	2	–	1	4	–	3	–	2
Georgia Tech	4	–	3	–	0	4	–	5	–	0
North Carolina	3	–	3	–	0	4	–	5	–	0
Auburn	3	–	3	–	0	5	–	4	–	0
LSU	3	–	3	–	0	6	–	3	–	0
Ole Miss	2	–	2	–	0	5	–	4	–	0
Mississippi A&M	2	–	3	–	0	5	–	4	–	0
VMI	2	–	4	–	0	5	–	5	–	0
Tulane	2	–	4	–	0	3	–	5	–	1
Maryland	1	–	3	–	1	5	–	4	–	1
Clemson	1	–	3	–	0	2	–	7	–	0
Florida	1	–	4	–	1	2	–	6	–	2
Kentucky	1	–	4	–	1	2	–	6	–	1
NC State	0	–	4	–	0	4	–	6	–	0
Sewanee	0	–	5	–	0	2	–	6	–	0
$ – Conference champion; Rankings from Dickinson System

The 1926 Virginia Cavaliers football team represented the University of Virginia as a member of the Southern Conference (SoCon) during the 1926 college football season. Led by fourth-year head coach Greasy Neale, the Cavaliers compiled an overall record of 6–2–2 with a mark of 4–2–1 in conference play, placing sixth in the SoCon. The team played its games at Lambeth Field in Charlottesville, Virginia.

== Schedule ==
Date	Opponent	Site	Result	Attendance	Source
September 25	Hampden–Sydney*	Lambeth Field; Charlottesville, VA	T 0–0		
October 2	Georgia	Lambeth Field; Charlottesville, VA	L 7–27		
October 9	Lynchburg*	Lambeth Field; Charlottesville, VA	W 38–0		
October 16	at VMI	Alumni Field; Lexington, VA	W 14–6		
October 23	at VPI	Miles Stadium; Blacksburg, VA (rivalry)	L 0–6		
October 30	at South Carolina	Melton Field; Columbia, SC	W 6–0		
November 6	Washington and Lee^{†}	Lambeth Field; Charlottesville, VA	W 30–7		
November 13	at Maryland	Byrd Stadium; College Park, MD (rivalry)	T 6–6		
November 20	Randolph–Macon*	Lambeth Field; Charlottesville, VA	W 57–0		
November 25	North Carolina	Lambeth Field; Charlottesville, VA (rivalry)	W 3–0	11,500–15,000	
*Non-conference game; ^{†}Homecoming
