= 1926 Georgia Tech Golden Tornado football team =

American college football season

1926 Georgia Tech Golden Tornado football
- Conference: Southern Conference
- Record: 4–5 (4–3 SoCon)
- Head coach: William Alexander (7th season)
- Offensive scheme: Jump shift
- Captain: Owen Poole
- Home stadium: Grant Field

Uniform
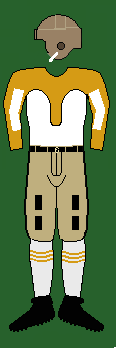

1926 Southern Conference football standings
	Conf.					Overall
Team	W		L		T	W		L		T
No. 7 Alabama $	8	–	0	–	0	9	–	0	–	1
Tennessee	5	–	1	–	0	8	–	1	–	0
Vanderbilt	4	–	1	–	0	8	–	1	–	0
South Carolina	4	–	2	–	0	6	–	4	–	0
Georgia	4	–	2	–	0	5	–	4	–	0
Virginia	4	–	2	–	1	6	–	2	–	2
VPI	3	–	2	–	1	5	–	3	–	1
Washington and Lee	3	–	2	–	1	4	–	3	–	2
Georgia Tech	4	–	3	–	0	4	–	5	–	0
North Carolina	3	–	3	–	0	4	–	5	–	0
Auburn	3	–	3	–	0	5	–	4	–	0
LSU	3	–	3	–	0	6	–	3	–	0
Ole Miss	2	–	2	–	0	5	–	4	–	0
Mississippi A&M	2	–	3	–	0	5	–	4	–	0
VMI	2	–	4	–	0	5	–	5	–	0
Tulane	2	–	4	–	0	3	–	5	–	1
Maryland	1	–	3	–	1	5	–	4	–	1
Clemson	1	–	3	–	0	2	–	7	–	0
Florida	1	–	4	–	1	2	–	6	–	2
Kentucky	1	–	4	–	1	2	–	6	–	1
NC State	0	–	4	–	0	4	–	6	–	0
Sewanee	0	–	5	–	0	2	–	6	–	0
$ – Conference champion; Rankings from Dickinson System

The 1926 Georgia Tech Golden Tornado football team (Note: Although Georgia Tech's teams are officially known as the "Yellow Jackets", northern writers called the team the "Golden Tornado" in 1917; the name was commonly used until 1928 and for many years afterwards as an alternate nickname. It may have been coined by Morgan Blake.) represented the Georgia Tech Golden Tornado of the Georgia Institute of Technology during the 1926 Southern Conference football season. The Tornado was coached by William Alexander in his seventh year as head coach, compiling a record of 4–5.

== Before the season ==
Doug Wycoff had graduated.

== Schedule ==
Date	Opponent	Site	Result	Attendance	Source
September 25	Oglethorpe*	Grant Field; Atlanta, GA	L 6-7	10,000	
October 2	VMI	Grant Field; Atlanta, GA	W 13–0		
October 9	Tulane	Grant Field; Atlanta, GA	W 9–6		
October 16	Alabama	Grant Field; Atlanta, GA (rivalry)	L 0-21	20,000	
October 23	Washington & Lee	Grant Field; Atlanta, GA	W 19–7		
October 30	at Notre Dame*	Cartier Field; South Bend, IN (rivalry)	L 0-12	11,000	
November 6	Vanderbilt	Grant Field; Atlanta, GA (rivalry)	L 7-13		
November 13	Georgia	Grant Field; Atlanta, GA (rivalry)	L 13-14		
November 25	Auburn	Grant Field; Atlanta, GA (rivalry)	W 20–7		
*Non-conference game

== Game summaries ==
=== Oglethorpe ===
Oglethorpe at Georgia Tech

Team	1	2	3	4	Total
• Oglethorpe	0	0	7	0	7
Ga. Tech	0	0	0	6	6

- Location: Grant Field
  Atlanta, GA

The season opened with a great upset and perhaps the greatest victory in the history of the Oglethorpe Stormy Petrels when they downed Tech 7–6. Halfback "Cy" Bell ran for a 42-yard touchdown run, and "Nutty" Campbell got the game-winning extra point. After the game, Oglethorpe fans reacted to the victory by staging a spontaneous parade through downtown Atlanta.

The starting lineup was Irwin (left end), Gaston (left tackle), Lillard (left guard), Poole (center), Drennon (right guard), Hood (right tackle), Hearn (right end), McRae (quarterback), Brewer (left halfback), Parham (right halfback), Holland (fullback)

=== VMI ===
In the second week of play, Tech shutout VMI 13–0. The starting lineup was Marshall (left end), Tharpe (left tackle), Martin (left guard), Poole (center), Angley (right guard), Hood (right tackle), Crowley (right end), McRae (quarterback), Smith (left halfback), Barron (right halfback), Murray (fullback)

=== Tulane ===
Tech edged Tulane 9–6. The starting lineup was Crowley (left end), Tharpe (left tackle), Martin (left guard), Poole (center), Angley (right guard), Hood (right tackle), Marshall (right end), Brewer (quarterback), Parham (left halfback), Barron (right halfback), Murray (fullback).

=== Alabama ===
Wallace Wade's national champion Alabama Crimson Tide surprised and held Georgia Tech to two first downs in a 21–0 victory. Hoyt Winslett passed for all three touchdowns.

The starting lineup was Crowley (left end), Tharpe (left tackle), Martin (left guard), Pund (center), Angley (right guard), Hood (right tackle), Marshall (right end), McRae (quarterback), Smith (left halfback), Reed (right halfback), Murray (fullback).

=== Washington and Lee ===
Tech beat the Washington & Lee Generals 19–7.

=== Notre Dame ===
Knute Rockne's undefeated Notre Dame beat Tech 12–0. Red Barron stood out in the cold weather.

=== Vanderbilt ===
Vanderbilt at Georgia Tech

Team	1	2	3	4	Total
• Vanderbilt	0	0	7	6	13
Ga. Tech	7	0	0	0	7

- Location: Grant Field
  Atlanta, GA

Vanderbilt beat Georgia Tech 13–7. Tech scored on an off-tackle play when Carter Barron got loose for a 50-yard run. Bill Spears faked a pass and ran for 24 yards to spark a drive to tie the game at 7, and added two field goals to beat the Tornado.

The starting lineup was Crowley (left end), Tharpe (left tackle), Martin (left guard), Poole (center), Lillard (right guard), Thrash (right tackle), Marshall (right end), Randolph (quarterback), Horn (left halfback), Barron (right halfback), Murray (fullback).

=== Georgia ===
Down 13 to 0 at the half, rival Georgia came back to beat Tech. Herdis McCrary and captain George Morton made the touchdowns.

The starting lineup was Crowley (left end), Hood (left tackle), Martin (left guard), Poole (center), Angley (right guard), Tharpe (right tackle), Marshall (right end), Brewer (quarterback), Parham (left halfback), Horn (right halfback), Murray (fullback).

=== Auburn ===
In the annual rivalry matchup, Tech beat Auburn 20–7. The starting lineup was Erwin (left end), Tharpe (left tackle), Martin (left guard), Poole (center), Drennon (right guard), Hood (right tackle), Marshall (right end), Brewer (quarterback), Parham (left halfback), Barron (right halfback), Murray (fullback).

== Players ==
=== Depth chart ===
The following chart provides a visual depiction of Tech's lineup during the 1924 season with games started at the position reflected in parentheses. The chart mimics the offense after the jump shift has taken place.

LE
Ed Crowley (4)
Bull Irwin (2)
Johnny Marshall (1)

LT	LG	C	RG	RT
Mack Tharpe (5)	Firpo Martin (5)	Owen Poole (6)	Tom Angley (4)	Papa Hood (5)
Gaston (1)		Peter Pund (1)	Raleigh Drennon (2)	Mack Tharpe (1)
Papa Hood (1)			John Lillard (1)	

RE
Johnny Marshall (5)
Ed Crowley (1)
Tiny Hearn (1)

QB
Finley McRae (4)
John Brewer (3)
Bob Randolph (1)

RHB
Carter Barron (4)
Bob Horn (1)
Bob Parham (1)
Reed (1)

FB
Sam Murray (6)
Ralph Holland (1)

LHB
Bob Parham (3)
Shorty Smith (2)
John Brewer (1)
Bob Horn (1)
