= 1926 Roanoke Maroons football team =

American college football season

1926 Roanoke Maroons football
- Conference: Virginia–North Carolina Intercollegiate Athletic Conference
- Record: 6–3 (5–1 V–NCIAC)
- Head coach: Pinky Spruhan (13th season)
- Home stadium: College Field

The 1926 Roanoke Maroons football team represented Roanoke College as a member of the Virginia–North Carolina Intercollegiate Athletic Conference (V–NCIAC) during the 1926 college football season. Led by 13th-year head coach Pinky Spruhan, the Maroons compiled an overall record of 6–3, with a mark of 5–1 in conference play.

== Schedule ==
Date	Time	Opponent	Site	Result	Source
September 25		at VPI*	Miles Stadium; Blacksburg, VA	L 0–47	
October 2		Randolph–Macon	College Field; Salem, VA	W 20–0	
October 9		at VMI*	Alumni Field; Lexington, VA	W 13–7	
October 16		at Gettysburg*	Memorial Field; Gettysburg, PA	L 2–21	
October 23		Hampden–Sydney	College Field; Salem, VA	W 3–0	
October 30	2:30 p.m.	at Richmond	Tate Field; Richmond, VA	W 6–0	
November 5		Bridgewater	College Field; Salem, VA	W 68–0	
November 20		Lynchburg	College Field; Salem, VA	W 10–7	
November 25		vs. Lenoir–Rhyne	Wearn Field; Charlotte, NC	L 0–3	
*Non-conference game; All times are in Eastern time
