= 1926 Maryland Aggies football team =

American college football season

1926 Maryland Aggies football
- Conference: Southern Conference
- Record: 5–4–1 (1–3–1 SoCon)
- Head coach: Curley Byrd (16th season)
- Home stadium: Byrd Stadium (original)

1926 Southern Conference football standings
	Conf.					Overall
Team	W		L		T	W		L		T
No. 7 Alabama $	8	–	0	–	0	9	–	0	–	1
Tennessee	5	–	1	–	0	8	–	1	–	0
Vanderbilt	4	–	1	–	0	8	–	1	–	0
South Carolina	4	–	2	–	0	6	–	4	–	0
Georgia	4	–	2	–	0	5	–	4	–	0
Virginia	4	–	2	–	1	6	–	2	–	2
VPI	3	–	2	–	1	5	–	3	–	1
Washington and Lee	3	–	2	–	1	4	–	3	–	2
Georgia Tech	4	–	3	–	0	4	–	5	–	0
North Carolina	3	–	3	–	0	4	–	5	–	0
Auburn	3	–	3	–	0	5	–	4	–	0
LSU	3	–	3	–	0	6	–	3	–	0
Ole Miss	2	–	2	–	0	5	–	4	–	0
Mississippi A&M	2	–	3	–	0	5	–	4	–	0
VMI	2	–	4	–	0	5	–	5	–	0
Tulane	2	–	4	–	0	3	–	5	–	1
Maryland	1	–	3	–	1	5	–	4	–	1
Clemson	1	–	3	–	0	2	–	7	–	0
Florida	1	–	4	–	1	2	–	6	–	2
Kentucky	1	–	4	–	1	2	–	6	–	1
NC State	0	–	4	–	0	4	–	6	–	0
Sewanee	0	–	5	–	0	2	–	6	–	0
$ – Conference champion; Rankings from Dickinson System

The 1926 Maryland Aggies football team represented the University of Maryland in the 1926 college football season. In their 16th season under head coach Curley Byrd, the Aggies compiled a 5–4–1 record (1–3–1 in conference), finished in 17th place in the Southern Conference, and outscored their opponents 161 to 93.

== Schedule ==
Date	Opponent	Site	Result	Attendance	Source
September 25	Washington College*	Byrd Stadium; College Park, MD	W 63–0		
October 2	at South Carolina	Melton Field; Columbia, SC	L 0–12		
October 9	at Chicago*	Stagg Field; Chicago, IL	L 0–21	35,000	
October 16	vs. VPI	League Park; Norfolk, VA	L 8–24	12,000	
October 23	North Carolina	Byrd Stadium; College Park, MD	W 14–6	3,500	
October 30	Gallaudet*	Byrd Stadium; College Park, MD	W 38–7		
November 6	at Yale*	Yale Bowl; New Haven, CT	W 15–0		
November 13	Virginia^{†}	Byrd Stadium; College Park, MD	T 6–6		
November 20	at Washington and Lee	Wilson Field; Lexington, VA	L 0–3		
November 25	at Johns Hopkins*	Baltimore Stadium; Baltimore, MD	W 17–14		
*Non-conference game; ^{†}Homecoming
