= 1926 VMI Keydets football team =

American college football season

1926 VMI Keydets football
- Conference: Southern Conference
- Record: 5–5 (2–4 SoCon)
- Head coach: Blandy Clarkson (7th season)
- Home stadium: Alumni Field

1926 Southern Conference football standings
	Conf.					Overall
Team	W		L		T	W		L		T
No. 7 Alabama $	8	–	0	–	0	9	–	0	–	1
Tennessee	5	–	1	–	0	8	–	1	–	0
Vanderbilt	4	–	1	–	0	8	–	1	–	0
South Carolina	4	–	2	–	0	6	–	4	–	0
Georgia	4	–	2	–	0	5	–	4	–	0
Virginia	4	–	2	–	1	6	–	2	–	2
VPI	3	–	2	–	1	5	–	3	–	1
Washington and Lee	3	–	2	–	1	4	–	3	–	2
Georgia Tech	4	–	3	–	0	4	–	5	–	0
North Carolina	3	–	3	–	0	4	–	5	–	0
Auburn	3	–	3	–	0	5	–	4	–	0
LSU	3	–	3	–	0	6	–	3	–	0
Ole Miss	2	–	2	–	0	5	–	4	–	0
Mississippi A&M	2	–	3	–	0	5	–	4	–	0
VMI	2	–	4	–	0	5	–	5	–	0
Tulane	2	–	4	–	0	3	–	5	–	1
Maryland	1	–	3	–	1	5	–	4	–	1
Clemson	1	–	3	–	0	2	–	7	–	0
Florida	1	–	4	–	1	2	–	6	–	2
Kentucky	1	–	4	–	1	2	–	6	–	1
NC State	0	–	4	–	0	4	–	6	–	0
Sewanee	0	–	5	–	0	2	–	6	–	0
$ – Conference champion; Rankings from Dickinson System

The 1926 VMI Keydets football team was an American football team that represented the Virginia Military Institute (VMI) during the 1926 college football season as a member of the Southern Conference. In their seventh year under head coach Blandy Clarkson, the team compiled an overall record of 5–5.

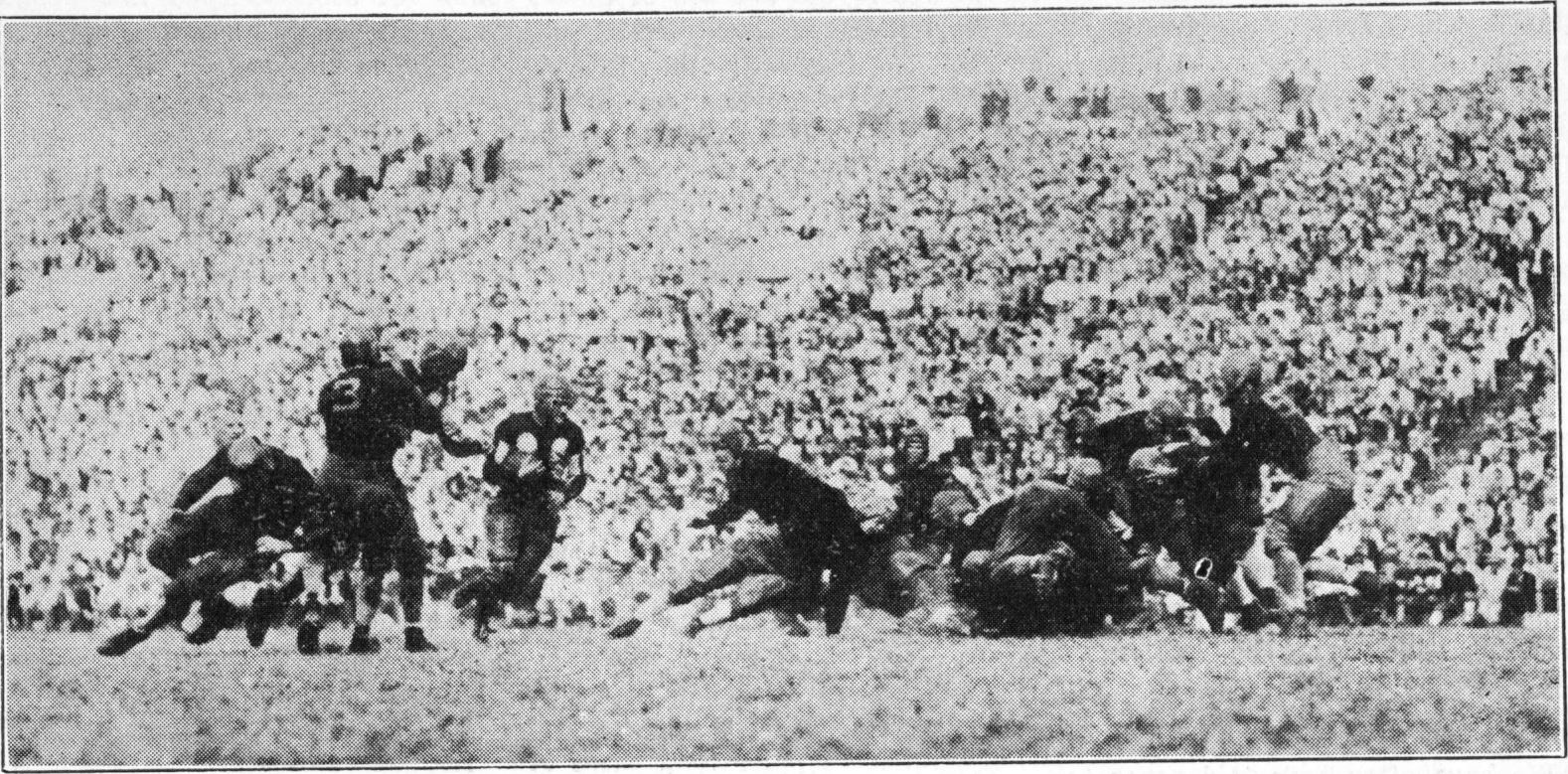
The game against Georgia Tech

== Schedule ==
Date	Opponent	Site	Result	Source
September 18	Wofford*	Alumni Field; Lexington, VA	W 20–0	
September 25	Richmond*	Alumni Field; Lexington, VA (rivalry)	W 10–0	
October 2	at Georgia Tech	Grant Field; Atlanta, GA	L 0–13	
October 9	Roanoke*	Alumni Field; Lexington, VA	L 7–13	
October 16	Virginia	Alumni Field; Lexington, VA	L 6–14	
October 23	vs. NC State	Tate Field; Richmond, VA	W 7–0	
October 30	vs. Davidson*	Lynchburg, VA	W 12–7	
November 6	at North Carolina	Emerson Field; Chapel Hill, NC	L 0–28	
November 13	vs. Kentucky	Laidley Field; Charleston, WV	W 10–9	
November 25	vs. VPI	Maher Field; Roanoke, VA (rivalry)	L 7–14	
*Non-conference game
