= 1926 North Carolina Tar Heels football team =

American college football season

1926 North Carolina Tar Heels football
- Conference: Southern Conference
- Record: 4–5 (3–3 SoCon)
- Head coach: Chuck Collins (1st season)
- Captain: Manly Whisnant
- Home stadium: Emerson Field

1926 Southern Conference football standings
	Conf.					Overall
Team	W		L		T	W		L		T
No. 7 Alabama $	8	–	0	–	0	9	–	0	–	1
Tennessee	5	–	1	–	0	8	–	1	–	0
Vanderbilt	4	–	1	–	0	8	–	1	–	0
South Carolina	4	–	2	–	0	6	–	4	–	0
Georgia	4	–	2	–	0	5	–	4	–	0
Virginia	4	–	2	–	1	6	–	2	–	2
VPI	3	–	2	–	1	5	–	3	–	1
Washington and Lee	3	–	2	–	1	4	–	3	–	2
Georgia Tech	4	–	3	–	0	4	–	5	–	0
North Carolina	3	–	3	–	0	4	–	5	–	0
Auburn	3	–	3	–	0	5	–	4	–	0
LSU	3	–	3	–	0	6	–	3	–	0
Ole Miss	2	–	2	–	0	5	–	4	–	0
Mississippi A&M	2	–	3	–	0	5	–	4	–	0
VMI	2	–	4	–	0	5	–	5	–	0
Tulane	2	–	4	–	0	3	–	5	–	1
Maryland	1	–	3	–	1	5	–	4	–	1
Clemson	1	–	3	–	0	2	–	7	–	0
Florida	1	–	4	–	1	2	–	6	–	2
Kentucky	1	–	4	–	1	2	–	6	–	1
NC State	0	–	4	–	0	4	–	6	–	0
Sewanee	0	–	5	–	0	2	–	6	–	0
$ – Conference champion; Rankings from Dickinson System

The 1926 North Carolina Tar Heels football team represented the University of North Carolina (now known as the University of North Carolina at Chapel Hill) during the 1926 college football season as a member of the Southern Conference (SoCon). The Tar Heels were led by head coach Chuck Collins in his first season and finished with a record of four wins and five losses (4–5 overall, 3–3 in the SoCon).

== Schedule ==
Date	Time	Opponent	Site	Result	Attendance	Source
September 25		at Wake Forest*	Gore Athletic Field; Wake Forest, NC (rivalry)	L 0–13	8,000	
October 2	3:30 p.m.	at Tennessee	Shields–Watkins Field; Knoxville, TN	L 0–34		
October 9	3:00 p.m.	South Carolina	Emerson Field; Chapel Hill, NC (rivalry)	W 7–0		
October 16	3:00 p.m.	Duke*	Emerson Field; Chapel Hill, NC (rivalry)	W 6–0	5,000–7,500	
October 23	2:30 p.m.	at Maryland	Byrd Stadium; College Park, MD	L 6–14	3,500	
October 30	2:30 p.m.	NC State	Emerson Field; Chapel Hill, NC (rivalry)	W 12–0		
November 6	3:00 p.m.	VMI	Emerson Field; Chapel Hill, NC	W 28–0	7,000	
November 13		at Davidson*	Richardson Field; Davidson, NC	L 0–10		
November 25		at Virginia	Lambeth Field; Charlottesville, VA (rivalry)	L 0–3	11,500–15,000	
*Non-conference game; All times are in Eastern time
