= 1926 Florida Gators football team =

American college football season

1926 Florida Gators football
- Conference: Southern Conference
- Record: 2–6–2 (1–4–1 19th SoCon)
- Head coach: Harold Sebring (2nd season)
- Offensive scheme: Notre Dame Box
- Captain: Lamar Sarra
- Home stadium: Fleming Field

Uniform
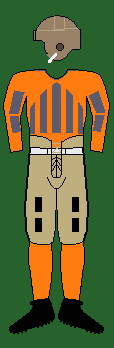

1926 Southern Conference football standings
	Conf.					Overall
Team	W		L		T	W		L		T
No. 7 Alabama $	8	–	0	–	0	9	–	0	–	1
Tennessee	5	–	1	–	0	8	–	1	–	0
Vanderbilt	4	–	1	–	0	8	–	1	–	0
South Carolina	4	–	2	–	0	6	–	4	–	0
Georgia	4	–	2	–	0	5	–	4	–	0
Virginia	4	–	2	–	1	6	–	2	–	2
VPI	3	–	2	–	1	5	–	3	–	1
Washington and Lee	3	–	2	–	1	4	–	3	–	2
Georgia Tech	4	–	3	–	0	4	–	5	–	0
North Carolina	3	–	3	–	0	4	–	5	–	0
Auburn	3	–	3	–	0	5	–	4	–	0
LSU	3	–	3	–	0	6	–	3	–	0
Ole Miss	2	–	2	–	0	5	–	4	–	0
Mississippi A&M	2	–	3	–	0	5	–	4	–	0
VMI	2	–	4	–	0	5	–	5	–	0
Tulane	2	–	4	–	0	3	–	5	–	1
Maryland	1	–	3	–	1	5	–	4	–	1
Clemson	1	–	3	–	0	2	–	7	–	0
Florida	1	–	4	–	1	2	–	6	–	2
Kentucky	1	–	4	–	1	2	–	6	–	1
NC State	0	–	4	–	0	4	–	6	–	0
Sewanee	0	–	5	–	0	2	–	6	–	0
$ – Conference champion; Rankings from Dickinson System

The 1926 Florida Gators football team represented the University of Florida during the 1926 college football season. The season was Harold Sebring's second and least successful campaign as the head coach of the Florida Gators football team. Sebring's 1926 Florida Gators finished 2–6–2 overall, and 1–4–1 in the Southern Conference, placing nineteenth of twenty-two teams in the conference standings.

The highlights of the season were the Gators' two victories home field over the Southern College Moccasins and Clemson Tigers, which were interspersed among four close losses to the Chicago Maroons (6–12), the Ole Miss Rebels (7–12), the Mercer Bears (3–7) and the Kentucky Wildcats (13–18), crushing defeats by the Georgia Bulldogs (9–32) and coach Wallace Wade's undefeated Alabama Crimson Tide (0–49), and two low-scoring ties with the Hampden–Sydney Tigers (0–0) and the Washington & Lee Generals.

== Before the season ==
Florida was set to play one of its hardest schedules. Former fullback Ray Dickson assisted Sebring.

Bill Middlekauff, a fullback who played on the 1923 and 1924 teams, returned to the squad. Key losses from the previous year included Edgar C. Jones.

== Schedule ==
Date	Opponent	Site	Result	Attendance	Source
September 25	Southern College*	Fleming Field; Gainesville, FL	W 16–0		
October 2	at Chicago*	Stagg Field; Chicago, IL	L 6–12	30,000	
October 6	Ole Miss	Fleming Field; Gainesville, FL	L 7–12		
October 16	at Mercer*	Centennial Stadium; Macon, GA	L 3–7	6,000	
October 23	vs. Kentucky	Durkee Field; Jacksonville, FL (rivalry)	L 13–18		
October 30	at Georgia	Sanford Field; Athens, GA (rivalry)	L 9–32		
November 6	Clemson^{†}	Fleming Field; Gainesville, FL	W 33–0		
November 13	at Alabama	Cramton Bowl; Montgomery, AL (rivalry)	L 0–49		
November 20	vs. Hampden–Sydney*	Plant Field; Tampa, FL	T 0–0	4,500	
November 27	vs. Washington & Lee	Durkee Field; Jacksonville, FL	T 7–7		
*Non-conference game; ^{†}Homecoming

== Game summaries ==
=== Southern College ===
The season opened with a 16–0 home victory over Southern College.

=== Chicago ===
Week 2: Florida at Chicago

Team	1	2	3	4	Total
Florida	6	0	0	0	6
• Chicago	6	3	0	3	12

- Date: October 2
- Location: Stagg Field, Chicago, IL
- Game attendance: 20,000

Amos Stagg's Chicago Maroons defeated Florida 12–6. A 60-yard forward pass from Wally Marks to Laurie Apitz scored first for Chicago. Stanley Rouse added two more field goals.

=== Ole Miss ===
Week 3: Ole Miss vs. Florida

Team	1	2	3	4	Total
• Ole Miss	6	0	0	6	12
Florida	0	0	0	7	7

- Date: October 6
- Location: Gainesville, FL

Ole Miss beat Florida with a "lucky pass." from Petty to Ap Applewhite.

The starting lineup was Stanley (left end), Davis (left tackle), Allen (left guard), Sarra (center), Tucker (right guard), Clemons (right tackle), Oosterhoudt (right end), Walker (quarterback), Owens (left halfback), Merrin (right halfback), Bishop (fullback).

=== Mercer ===
Week 4: Florida at Mercer

Team	1	2	3	4	Total
• Florida	6	0	0	0	6
Mercer	0	3	0	0	3

- Date: October 9
- Location: Macon, GA
- Referee: Herman Stegeman

The Mercer Bears surprised and beat Florida in a close loss, 7–3. Florida's Bishop made a 30-yard field goal. The game's umpire was Buck Flowers.

The starting lineup was Oosterhoudt (left end), Davis (left tackle), J. Stewart (left guard), Sarra (center), Tucker (right guard), Clemmons (right tackle), Stanley (right end), Bowyer (quarterback), Owens (left halfback), Beck (right halfback), Bishop (fullback).

=== Kentucky ===
Week 5: Kentucky at Florida

Team	1	2	3	4	Total
• Kentucky	12	0	0	6	18
Florida	7	6	0	0	13

- Date: October 20
- Location: Jacksonville, FL
- Game weather: Hot
- Referee: Alex Cunningham

Once after three days practice, Sebring took his men to Kingsley Lake. Injuries plagued the season. Florida lost to Kentucky 13–18. The game was hot, "with the thermometer standing in the eihties. A spectator, J. D. Alverman, 50, dropped dead during an exciting moment of the game.

Kentucky scored first, when captain Frank Smith bucked across the goal line. The extra point was missed. Florida took the lead after a Kentucky fumble on a punt was recovered by Tommy Owens. Beck went over, and Owens added the extra point. By a series of forward passes, Kentucky got another touchdown. Owens went right around end for Florida to regain the lead. After a scoreless third period, Kentucky put together a winning touchdown drive in the fourth quarter.

The starting lineup was Oosterhoudt (left end), Clemons (left tackle), Tucker (left guard), Harris (center), Stewart (right guard), Chaplin (right tackle), Dehoff (right end), Bowyer (quarterback), Beck (left halfback), Owens (right halfback), Ihrig (fullback).

=== Georgia ===
Week 6: Florida at Georgia

Team	1	2	3	4	Total
Florida	0	2	7	0	9
• Georgia	6	13	13	0	32

- Date: October 30
- Location: Athens, GA
- Game attendance: 5,000
- Game weather: Warm
- Referee: Hull

Georgia crushed the Gators 32–9. The weather was too warm, and the game suffered from several penalties.

The starting lineup was Oosterhoudt (left end), Clemons (left tackle), Ripley (left guard), Sarra (center), Tucker (right guard), Chaplin (right tackle), Trogden (right end), Bowyer (quarterback), Owens (left halfback), Larson (right halfback), Davis (fullback).

=== Clemson ===
At home, Florida defeated the Clemson Tigers 33–0. Willie DeHoff caught two touchdowns.

=== Alabama ===
Wallace Wade's undefeated national champion Alabama Crimson Tide rolled over the Gators 49–0.

The starting lineup was Stanley (left end), Green (left tackle), Tucker (left guard), Sarra (center), Allen (right guard), Clemons (right tackle), Oosterhoudt (right end), Bowyer (quarterback), Owens (left halfback), Livingston (right halfback), Ihrig (fullback).

=== Hampden–Sydney ===
Week 9: Hampden–Sydney vs. Florida

Team	1	2	3	4	Total
Hampden–Sydney	0	0	0	0	0
Florida	0	0	0	0	0

- Date: November 20
- Location: Plant Field
  Tampa, FL
- Game attendance: 10,000

The Gators and the Hampden–Sydney Tigers fought to a scoreless tie. Tommy Owens suffered a broken collarbone.

=== Washington & Lee ===
Coach Pat Herron's Washington and Lee Generals tied Florida 7–7.

== Postseason ==
"The wolves began to clamor for Sebring's scalp as the 1926 season ended" wrote Pete Norton.

== Players ==
=== Depth chart ===
The following chart provides a visual depiction of Florida's lineup during the 1926 season with games started at the position reflected in parentheses. The chart mimics a Notre Dame Box on offense.

LE
Frank Oosterhoudt (3)
Dutch Stanley (2)

LT	LG	C	RG	RT
Jus Clemons (2)	Tucker (2)	Lamar Sarra (4)	Tucker (3)	Jus Clemons (3)
Davis (2)	Allen (1)	Harris (1)	Allen (1)	Tiny Chaplin (2)
Green (1)	Ripley (1)		Stewart (1)	
	Stewart (1)			

RE
Frank Oosterhoudt (2)
Willie DeHoff (1)
Dutch Stanley (1)
Trogden (1)

QB
Goof Bowyer (4)
Speedy Walker (1)

RHB
Tommy Owens (4)
Cecil Beck (1)

LHB
Cecil Beck (1)
Larson (1)
Livingston (1)
Joe Merrin (1)
Tommy Owens (1)

FB
Horse Bishop (2)
Elmer Ihrig (2)
Davis (1)
