= 1926 Clemson Tigers football team =

American college football season

1926 Clemson Tigers football
- Conference: Southern Conference
- Record: 2–7 (1–3 SoCon)
- Head coach: Bud Saunders (4th season; first 4 games); Bob Williams (6th season, last 5 games)
- Captain: B. C. Harvey
- Home stadium: Riggs Field

1926 Southern Conference football standings
	Conf.					Overall
Team	W		L		T	W		L		T
No. 7 Alabama $	8	–	0	–	0	9	–	0	–	1
Tennessee	5	–	1	–	0	8	–	1	–	0
Vanderbilt	4	–	1	–	0	8	–	1	–	0
South Carolina	4	–	2	–	0	6	–	4	–	0
Georgia	4	–	2	–	0	5	–	4	–	0
Virginia	4	–	2	–	1	6	–	2	–	2
VPI	3	–	2	–	1	5	–	3	–	1
Washington and Lee	3	–	2	–	1	4	–	3	–	2
Georgia Tech	4	–	3	–	0	4	–	5	–	0
North Carolina	3	–	3	–	0	4	–	5	–	0
Auburn	3	–	3	–	0	5	–	4	–	0
LSU	3	–	3	–	0	6	–	3	–	0
Ole Miss	2	–	2	–	0	5	–	4	–	0
Mississippi A&M	2	–	3	–	0	5	–	4	–	0
VMI	2	–	4	–	0	5	–	5	–	0
Tulane	2	–	4	–	0	3	–	5	–	1
Maryland	1	–	3	–	1	5	–	4	–	1
Clemson	1	–	3	–	0	2	–	7	–	0
Florida	1	–	4	–	1	2	–	6	–	2
Kentucky	1	–	4	–	1	2	–	6	–	1
NC State	0	–	4	–	0	4	–	6	–	0
Sewanee	0	–	5	–	0	2	–	6	–	0
$ – Conference champion; Rankings from Dickinson System

The 1926 Clemson Tigers football team represented Clemson College—now known as Clemson University—as a member of the Southern Conference (SoCon) during the 1924 college football season. The Tigers were led by fourth-year head coach Bud Saunders for the first four game of the season, before he resigned. Bob Williams, who has previously served as the team's head coach in 1906, 1909, and from 1913 to 1915, replaced Saunders the final five games of the season. Clemson compiled and overall record of 2–7 with a mark of 1–3 in conference play, placing 18th in the SoCon.

== Schedule ==
Date	Opponent	Site	Result	Attendance	Source
September 18	Erskine*	Riggs Field; Calhoun, SC	W 7–0		
September 25	Presbyterian*	Riggs Field; Calhoun, SC	L 0–14		
October 2	at Auburn	Drake Field; Auburn, AL (rivalry)	L 0–47		
October 9	NC State	Riggs Field; Calhoun, SC (rivalry)	W 7–3		
October 21	at South Carolina	State Fairgrounds; Columbia, SC (rivalry)	L 0–24	12,000	
October 28	at Wofford*	Snyder Field; Spartanburg, SC	L 0–3		
November 6	at Florida	Fleming Field; Gainesville, FL	L 0–33		
November 13	The Citadel*	Riggs Field; Calhoun, SC	L 6–15		
November 25	at Furman*	Manly Field; Greenville, SC	L 0–30		
*Non-conference game
