= 1926 Alabama Crimson Tide football team =

American college football season

1926 Alabama Crimson Tide football

National champion (QPRS, Billingsley, CFRA, Poling) Co-national champion (Helms, NCF) SoCon champion

Rose Bowl, T 7–7 vs. Stanford
- Conference: Southern Conference
- Record: 9–0–1 (8–0 SoCon)
- Head coach: Wallace Wade (4th season)
- Offensive scheme: Single-wing
- Captain: Bruce Jones
- Home stadium: Denny Field; Rickwood Field; Cramton Bowl

Uniform
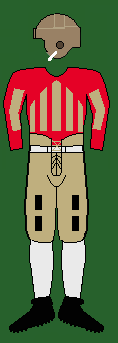

1926 Southern Conference football standings
| | Conf. | | | | | Overall |
| Team | W | | L | | T | W | | L | | T |
|---|---|---|---|---|---|---|---|---|---|---|
| No. 7 Alabama $ | 8 | – | 0 | – | 0 | 9 | – | 0 | – | 1 |
| Tennessee | 5 | – | 1 | – | 0 | 8 | – | 1 | – | 0 |
| Vanderbilt | 4 | – | 1 | – | 0 | 8 | – | 1 | – | 0 |
| South Carolina | 4 | – | 2 | – | 0 | 6 | – | 4 | – | 0 |
| Georgia | 4 | – | 2 | – | 0 | 5 | – | 4 | – | 0 |
| Virginia | 4 | – | 2 | – | 1 | 6 | – | 2 | – | 2 |
| VPI | 3 | – | 2 | – | 1 | 5 | – | 3 | – | 1 |
| Washington and Lee | 3 | – | 2 | – | 1 | 4 | – | 3 | – | 2 |
| Georgia Tech | 4 | – | 3 | – | 0 | 4 | – | 5 | – | 0 |
| North Carolina | 3 | – | 3 | – | 0 | 4 | – | 5 | – | 0 |
| Auburn | 3 | – | 3 | – | 0 | 5 | – | 4 | – | 0 |
| LSU | 3 | – | 3 | – | 0 | 6 | – | 3 | – | 0 |
| Ole Miss | 2 | – | 2 | – | 0 | 5 | – | 4 | – | 0 |
| Mississippi A&M | 2 | – | 3 | – | 0 | 5 | – | 4 | – | 0 |
| VMI | 2 | – | 4 | – | 0 | 5 | – | 5 | – | 0 |
| Tulane | 2 | – | 4 | – | 0 | 3 | – | 5 | – | 1 |
| Maryland | 1 | – | 3 | – | 1 | 5 | – | 4 | – | 1 |
| Clemson | 1 | – | 3 | – | 0 | 2 | – | 7 | – | 0 |
| Florida | 1 | – | 4 | – | 1 | 2 | – | 6 | – | 2 |
| Kentucky | 1 | – | 4 | – | 1 | 2 | – | 6 | – | 1 |
| NC State | 0 | – | 4 | – | 0 | 4 | – | 6 | – | 0 |
| Sewanee | 0 | – | 5 | – | 0 | 2 | – | 6 | – | 0 |
$ – Conference champion; Rankings from Dickinson System

The 1926 Alabama Crimson Tide football team (variously "Alabama", "UA" or "Bama") represented the University of Alabama in the 1926 college football season. It was the Crimson Tide's 33rd overall and 5th season as a member of the Southern Conference (SoCon). The team was led by head coach Wallace Wade, in his fourth year, and played their home games at Denny Field in Tuscaloosa, at Rickwood Field in Birmingham and at the Cramton Bowl in Montgomery, Alabama. They finished the season with a record of nine wins, zero losses and one tie (9–0–1 overall, 8–0 in the SoCon), as Southern Conference champions. They tied undefeated Stanford in the Rose Bowl. The 1926 Alabama team was retroactively named as the 1926 national champion by Berryman QPRS, Billingsley Report, College Football Researchers Association, and Poling System, and as a co-national champion by the Helms Athletic Foundation and National Championship Foundation. The team was ranked No. 9 in the nation in the Dickinson System ratings released in December 1926.

== Schedule ==
| Date | Opponent | Site | Result | Attendance | Source |
|---|---|---|---|---|---|
| September 24 | Millsaps* | Denny Field; Tuscaloosa, AL | W 54–0 | 4,000 | |
| October 2 | at Vanderbilt | Dudley Field; Nashville, TN | W 19–7 | 16,000 | |
| October 9 | at Mississippi A&M | Meridian Fairgrounds; Meridian, MS (rivalry) | W 26–7 | | |
| October 16 | at Georgia Tech | Grant Field; Atlanta, GA (rivalry) | W 21–0 | 20,000 | |
| October 23 | Sewanee | Rickwood Field; Birmingham, AL | W 2–0 | | |
| October 30 | LSU^{†} | Denny Field; Tuscaloosa, AL (rivalry) | W 24–0 | | |
| November 6 | Kentucky | Rickwood Field; Birmingham, AL | W 14–0 | | |
| November 13 | Florida | Cramton Bowl; Montgomery, AL (rivalry) | W 49–0 | | |
| November 25 | Georgia | Rickwood Field; Birmingham, AL (rivalry) | W 33–6 | 17,000 | |
| January 1, 1927 | vs. Stanford* | Rose Bowl Stadium; Pasadena, CA (Rose Bowl) | T 7–7 | 56,000 | |
*Non-conference game; ^{†}Homecoming

== Before the season ==
As they entered the season, only ten lettermen returned from the 1925 squad that won the Rose Bowl. Key players such as Pooley Hubert, Johnny Mack Brown, Bill Buckler and other stars from the 1925 team were not part of the 1926 squad.

== Game summaries ==
=== Millsaps ===
Week 1: Millsaps at Alabama

| Team | 1 | 2 | 3 | 4 | Total |
|---|---|---|---|---|---|
| Millsaps | 0 | 0 | 0 | 0 | 0 |
| • Alabama | 14 | 6 | 15 | 19 | 54 |

- Date: September 24
- Location: Denny Field
  Tuscaloosa, Alabama
- Game attendance: 4,000
- Referee: Charles Kittleman

Alabama opened their 1926 season against the Millsaps Majors on a Friday at Denny Field, winning, 54–0, in what was the first meeting between the schools.

Tolbert Brown starred for Alabama in the contest and scored three touchdowns on runs of 92, 70 and 30 yards. David Rosenfeld and Red Barnes each scored two and Herschel Caldwell one touchdown for the Crimson Tide in the victory.

=== Vanderbilt ===
Week 2: Alabama at Vanderbilt

| Team | 1 | 2 | 3 | 4 | Total |
|---|---|---|---|---|---|
| • Alabama | 13 | 0 | 0 | 6 | 19 |
| Vanderbilt | 0 | 0 | 0 | 7 | 7 |

- Date: October 2
- Location: Dudley Field
  Nashville, Tennessee
- Referee: Finley

Alabama opened conference play with a 19–7 victory against the Vanderbilt Commodores, that saw coach Wade against his former mentor Dan McGugin After each team traded fumbles, the Crimson Tide took a 7–0 lead on an eight-yard Hoyt Winslett touchdown pass to Herschel Caldwell. They extended it further to 13–0 later in the first on a 21-yard Red Barnes touchdown run. Neither team scored again until the fourth quarter when the Commodores scored their only points on a three-yard Bill Hendrix touchdown run. Alabama then made the final score 19–7 on a 36-yard Winslett touchdown pass to Caldwell.

The starting lineup was Enis (left end), Perry (left tackle), Hagler (left guard), Holmes (center), Bowdoin (right guard), Pickhard (right tackle), Winslett (right end), Barnes (quarterback), T. Brown (left halfback), Caldwell (right halfback), Johnson (fullback).

=== Mississippi A&M ===
Week 3: Alabama at Mississippi A&M

| Team | 1 | 2 | 3 | 4 | Total |
|---|---|---|---|---|---|
| • Alabama | 7 | 0 | 7 | 12 | 26 |
| Mississippi A&M | 0 | 7 | 0 | 0 | 7 |

- Date: October 9
- Location: Meridian Fairgrounds
  Meridian, Mississippi
- Referee: Charles Kittleman

Against Mississippi A&M, Alabama had seven interceptions en route to a 26–7 victory at the Meridian Fairgrounds. The Crimson Tide took a 7–0 lead in the first quarter behind a one-yard Red Barnes touchdown run. The Aggies responded in the second with a ten-yard J. H. Meeks touchdown pass to W. B. Ricks that tied the game 7–7 at halftime.

Alabama then took a 14–7 lead in the third quarter behind a Hoyt Winslett touchdown pass to Archie Taylor. They then closed the game with a pair of touchdowns in the fourth quarter that made the final score 26–7. The first was scored by Barnes on a 90-yard interception return and by Melvin Vines on a second interception return.

The starting lineup was Winslett (left end), Pickhard (left tackle), Hagler (left guard), Pearce (center), Leslie Payne (right guard), Perry (right tackle), Enis (right end), Barnes (quarterback), T. Brown (left halfback), Caldwell (right halfback), Johnson (fullback).

=== Georgia Tech ===
Week 4: Alabama at Georgia Tech

| Team | 1 | 2 | 3 | 4 | Total |
|---|---|---|---|---|---|
| • Alabama | 7 | 7 | 0 | 7 | 21 |
| Georgia Tech | 0 | 0 | 0 | 0 | 0 |

- Date: October 16
- Location: Grant Field
  Atlanta
- Game attendance: 20,000
- Referee: Arthur R. Hutchins

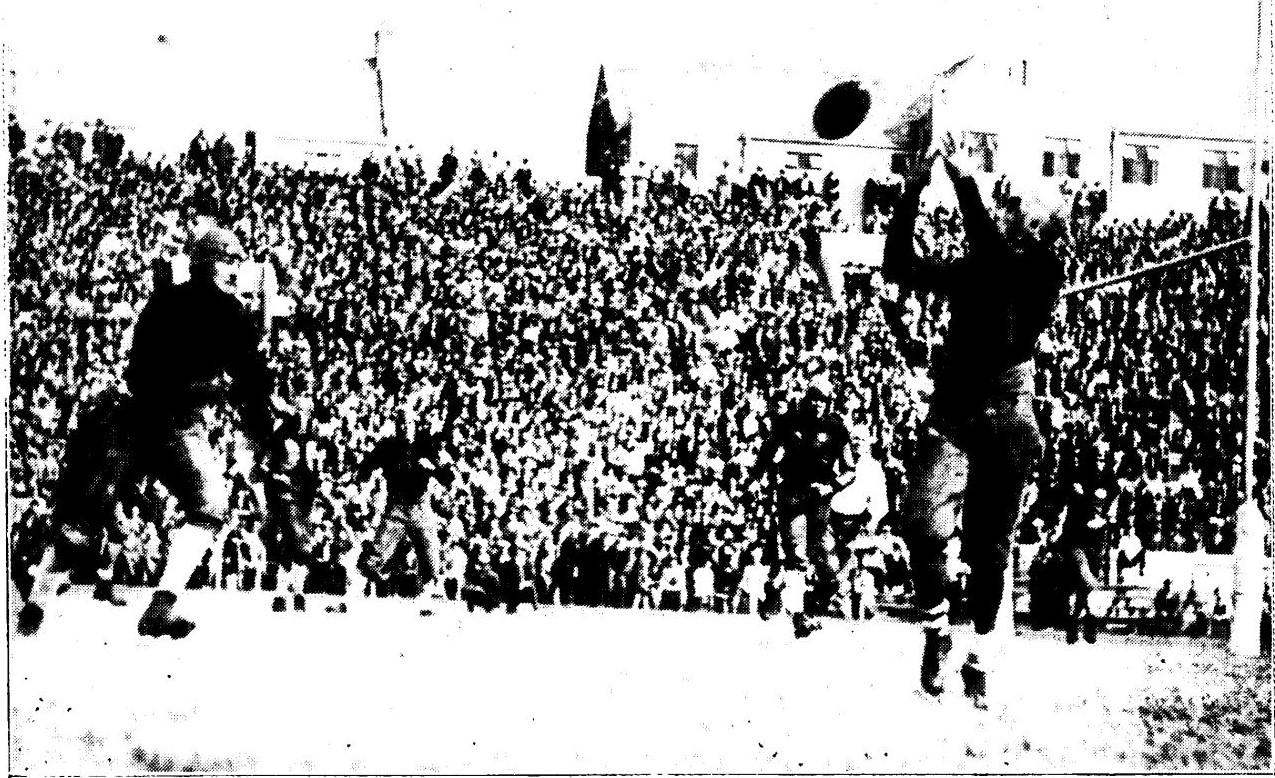
The pass that resulted in Alabama's first touchdown against Georgia Tech

In a game that saw Alabama hold Georgia Tech to only a pair of first downs, the Crimson Tide defeated the Golden Tornado 21–0 at Grant Field in Atlanta.

After an exchange of punts, Alabama scored their first touchdown on a 14-yard Hoyt Winslett pass to Melvin Vines for a 7–0 lead. On the first offensive play after a Red Barnes interception in the second quarter, Winslett connected with Archie Taylor on a 38-yard touchdown pass and a 14–0 lead.

Barnes then made the final score 21–0 with his four-yard touchdown run late in the fourth quarter.

=== Sewanee ===
Week 5: Sewanee at Alabama

| Team | 1 | 2 | 3 | 4 | Total |
|---|---|---|---|---|---|
| Sewanee | 0 | 0 | 0 | 0 | 0 |
| • Alabama | 0 | 0 | 0 | 2 | 2 |

- Date: October 23
- Location: Rickwood Field
  Birmingham, Alabama
- Referee: Everett Strupper

Against Sewanee, Alabama had multiple scoring chances but could not convert and only defeated the Tigers by a score of 2–0. Orin Helvey provided most of Sewanee's defense. Once Bama was stopped at the Sewanee nine-yard line, and in the fourth quarter Alabama was stopped at the Sewanee one-yard line. Sewanee did not move the ball as much as Alabama did but reached the Alabama 6 in the second quarter before a 15-yard penalty threw them back. The game almost ended in a scoreless tie, but late in the fourth Fred Pickhard blocked a Sewanee punt which rolled out the back of the end zone for a safety and a 2–0 Tide victory.

The starting lineup was Enis (left end), Perry (left tackle), Hagler (left guard), Pearce (center), Bowdoin (right guard), Pickhard (right tackle), Winslett (right end), Barnes (quarterback), Vines (left halfback), Caldwell (right halfback), Johnson (fullback).

=== LSU ===
Week 6: LSU at Alabama

| Team | 1 | 2 | 3 | 4 | Total |
|---|---|---|---|---|---|
| LSU | 0 | 0 | 0 | 0 | 0 |
| • Alabama | 0 | 3 | 7 | 14 | 24 |

- Date: October 30
- Location: Denny Field
  Tuscaloosa, Alabama
- Referee: Everett Strupper

On homecoming in Tuscaloosa, Alabama defeated the LSU Tigers 24–0. After a scoreless first quarter, the Crimson Tide took a 3–0 halftime lead behind a 17-yard Herschel Caldwell field goal. Both defenses still played well into the third quarter with Alabama scoring their first touchdown after Fred Pickhard blocked a Charlie Mason punt that was returned by Hoyt Winslett for a 10–0 Crimson Tide lead.

In the fourth quarter, Pickhard blocked a second punt and Ben Enis returned it 15-yards for a touchdown. The Crimson Tide then made the final score 24–0 late in the fourth after Red Barnes scored the only offensive touchdown of the game on a short run.

The starting lineup was Winslett (left end), Pickhard (left tackle), Pearce (left guard), Holmes (center), Hagler (right guard), Perry (right tackle), Enis (right end), Barnes (quarterback), T. Brown (left halfback), Caldwell (right halfback), Reverra (fullback).

=== Kentucky ===
Week 7: Kentucky at Alabama

| Team | 1 | 2 | 3 | 4 | Total |
|---|---|---|---|---|---|
| Kentucky | 0 | 0 | 0 | 0 | 0 |
| • Alabama | 0 | 7 | 7 | 0 | 14 |

- Date: November 6
- Location: Rickwood Field
  Birmingham, Alabama

At Rickwood Field, the Crimson Tide defeated the Kentucky Wildcats 14–0. After a scoreless first quarter, Hoyt Winslett gave Alabama a 7–0 halftime lead with his one-yard touchdown run. Winslett then scored the other Crimson Tide touchdown of the game early in the third quarter that made the final score 14–0.

The starting lineup was Winslett (left end), Perry (left tackle), Pearce (left guard), Holmes (center), Hagler (right guard), Pickhard (right tackle), Enis (right end), Barnes (quarterback), T. Brown (left halfback), Caldwell (right halfback), Reverra (fullback).

=== Florida ===
Week 8: Florida at Alabama

| Team | 1 | 2 | 3 | 4 | Total |
|---|---|---|---|---|---|
| Florida | 0 | 0 | 0 | 0 | 0 |
| • Alabama | 7 | 14 | 14 | 14 | 49 |

- Date: November 13
- Location: Cramton Bowl
  Montgomery, Alabama
- Referee: Springer

At the Cramton Bowl in Montgomery, Alabama scored in all four quarters en route to a 49–0 victory over the Florida Gators. Tolbert Brown scored the Crimson Tide's first three touchdowns and gave Alabama a 21–0 halftime lead. He scored in the first quarter on a short run, and on a second short run and reception from Hoyt Winslett in the second.

Brown continued his scoring in the third quarter with his 47-yard touchdown run. Red Barnes then made the score 35–0 at the end of the third with his short touchdown run. The Crimson tide then closed the game with a short Robert Lee Hamner touchdown run and an Earl Smith touchdown reception from Raymond Pepper that made the final score 49–0.

The starting lineup was Winslett (left end), Perry (left tackle), Bowdoin (left guard), Holmes (center), Hagler (right guard), Pickhard (right tackle), Enis (right end), Barnes (quarterback), T. Brown (left halfback), Vines (right halfback), Caldwell (fullback).

=== Georgia ===
Week 9: Georgia at Alabama

| Team | 1 | 2 | 3 | 4 | Total |
|---|---|---|---|---|---|
| Georgia | 0 | 0 | 0 | 6 | 6 |
| • Alabama | 12 | 0 | 6 | 15 | 33 |

- Date: November 25
- Location: Rickwood Field
  Birmingham, Alabama
- Game attendance: 17,000
- Referee: Springer

In their final regular season game, Alabama defeated the Georgia Bulldogs 33–6 and clinched their third consecutive Southern Conference championship. The Crimson Tide took a 12–0 first quarter lead behind short touchdown runs from Hoyt Winslett and Red Barnes. After a scoreless second quarter, Winslett extended their lead to 18–0 in the third quarter with his touchdown pass to Archie Taylor.

The Crimson Tide then closed the game with 15 fourth quarter points on a 42-yard Taylor run, a 20-yard Jimmy Johnson interception return and when the Bulldogs' punter Frank Dudley was tackled in the endzone for a safety. Georgia then scored their first points against Alabama in four years on the final play of the game when a Crimson Tide punt was blocked by Olin Huff and recovered by Harvey Hill in the endzone for a touchdown and a final score of 33–6.

The starting lineup was Winslett (left end), Perry (left tackle), Pearce (left guard), Holmes (center), Hagler (right guard), Pickhard (right tackle), Enis (right end), Barnes (quarterback), T. Brown (left halfback), Vines (right halfback), Caldwell (fullback).

== Postseason ==
=== Stanford ===
Rose Bowl

| Team | 1 | 2 | 3 | 4 | Total |
|---|---|---|---|---|---|
| Alabama | 0 | 0 | 0 | 7 | 7 |
| Stanford | 7 | 0 | 0 | 0 | 7 |

- Date: January 1
- Location: Rose Bowl
  Pasadena, California

Again the season was extended as Alabama received another invitation to play in the Rose Bowl. The 1927 Rose Bowl was the first sporting event to ever be nationally broadcast on radio. Alabama's opponent was the Stanford Cardinal, also 9–0 and coached by football legend Pop Warner.

Stanford mounted a 63-yard drive in the first quarter to take a 7–0 lead. Stanford dominated play for much of the rest of the game, outgaining Alabama 305 yards to 98, but could not score again. Late in the fourth Bama got the big play it needed: Clark Pearce blocked a punt by Frankie Wilton of Stanford, setting up the Tide at the Cardinal 14. Five plays later, with only seconds remaining, Alabama punched it in from the 1 to make the score 7–6. The two-point conversion would not become a rule in college football for another 32 years, so Alabama lined up for the game-tying extra point. As the teams came to the line, Red Barnes of Alabama shouted "Signals off!". Stanford took that to mean that Alabama was resetting and relaxed. Instead, Alabama promptly snapped and kicked the extra point to tie the game. Stanford ran only two plays before time expired and the game ended a 7–7 tie.

The starting lineup was Ennis (left end), Perry (left tackle), Hagler (left guard), Pearce (center), Bowdon (right guard), Pickard (right tackle), Winslett (right end), Barnes (quarterback), Brown (left halfback), Taylor (right halfback), Caldwell (fullback).

=== Awards and honors ===
The NCAA retroactively named Alabama and Stanford co-national champions for 1926 due to each being chosen by several of the ranking authorities. It was a second consecutive national championship for Wallace Wade and the Crimson Tide. The tie with Stanford snapped a 20-game winning streak that remains the third-longest in school history, behind two 28-game winning streaks from 1978 to 1980 and another from 1991 to 1993, and a 26-game winning streak from 2015 to 2016.

== Personnel ==
=== Varsity letter winners ===
==== Line ====
| Number | Player | Hometown | Position | Games started | Prep school | Height | Weight | Age |
|---|---|---|---|---|---|---|---|---|
| | Ben Enis | Fayette, Alabama | End | 7 | | | | |
| | Gordon Holmes | Springville, Alabama | Center | 5 | | | | |
| | Leslie Payne | Bay Minette, Alabama | Tackle | 1 | | | | |
| | Clark Pearce | Winfield, Alabama | Tackle | 5 | | | | |
| 72 | Fred Pickhard | Mobile, Alabama | Tackle | 7 | Mobile High | 6'2" | 201 | 20 |
| | Earl Smith | Haleyville, Alabama | End | | | | | |
| | Melvin Vines | Bessemer, Alabama | End | 3 | | | | |
| 58 | Hoyt "Wu" Winslett | Dadeville, Alabama | End | 7 | | | 172 | 22 |

==== Backfield ====
| Player | Hometown | Position | Games started | Prep school | Height | Weight | Age |
|---|---|---|---|---|---|---|---|
| Red Barnes | Grove Hill, Alabama | Halfback | 7 | | | 172 | 21 |
| Tolbert "Red" Brown | Dothan, Alabama | Halfback | 6 | Dothan High | | | 20 |
| Herschel Caldwell | Blytheville, Arkansas | Halfback | 7 | | | | 23 |
| Robert Lee Hamner | Fayette, Alabama | Back | | | | | |
| William Morrison | Selma, Alabama | Fullback | | | | | |
| Ray Pepper | Albany, Alabama | Fullback | | | | | |
| David Rosenfeld | Birmingham, Alabama | Halfback | | | | | |
| Archie Taylor | Savannah, Georgia | Back | | | | | |

==== Other ====
| Player | Hometown | Position |
|---|---|---|
| Hugh Dowling | | Manager |

=== Coaching staff ===
| Name | Position | Seasons at Alabama | Alma mater |
|---|---|---|---|
| Wallace Wade | Head coach | 4 | Brown (1917) |
| Hank Crisp | Assistant coach | 6 | VPI (1920) |
| Russell Cohen | Assistant coach | 4 | Vanderbilt (1916) |
| Clyde "Shorty" Propst | Assistant coach | 2 | Alabama (1924) |
| William T. Van de Graaff | Assistant coach | 6 | Alabama (1916) |
