= 1926 Georgia Bulldogs football team =

American college football season

1926 Georgia Bulldogs football
- Conference: Southern Conference
- Record: 5–4 (4–2 SoCon)
- Head coach: George Cecil Woodruff (4th season)
- Captain: George Morton
- Home stadium: Sanford Field

1926 Southern Conference football standings
	Conf.					Overall
Team	W		L		T	W		L		T
No. 7 Alabama $	8	–	0	–	0	9	–	0	–	1
Tennessee	5	–	1	–	0	8	–	1	–	0
Vanderbilt	4	–	1	–	0	8	–	1	–	0
South Carolina	4	–	2	–	0	6	–	4	–	0
Georgia	4	–	2	–	0	5	–	4	–	0
Virginia	4	–	2	–	1	6	–	2	–	2
VPI	3	–	2	–	1	5	–	3	–	1
Washington and Lee	3	–	2	–	1	4	–	3	–	2
Georgia Tech	4	–	3	–	0	4	–	5	–	0
North Carolina	3	–	3	–	0	4	–	5	–	0
Auburn	3	–	3	–	0	5	–	4	–	0
LSU	3	–	3	–	0	6	–	3	–	0
Ole Miss	2	–	2	–	0	5	–	4	–	0
Mississippi A&M	2	–	3	–	0	5	–	4	–	0
VMI	2	–	4	–	0	5	–	5	–	0
Tulane	2	–	4	–	0	3	–	5	–	1
Maryland	1	–	3	–	1	5	–	4	–	1
Clemson	1	–	3	–	0	2	–	7	–	0
Florida	1	–	4	–	1	2	–	6	–	2
Kentucky	1	–	4	–	1	2	–	6	–	1
NC State	0	–	4	–	0	4	–	6	–	0
Sewanee	0	–	5	–	0	2	–	6	–	0
$ – Conference champion; Rankings from Dickinson System

The 1926 Georgia Bulldogs football team represented the University of Georgia during the 1926 college football season. The Bulldogs completed the season with a 5–4 record. This season included Georgia's fifth straight loss to Alabama and fourth straight loss to Yale. Down 13 to 0 at the half, Georgia came back to beat Georgia Tech. Herdis McCrary and captain George Morton made the touchdowns.

== Schedule ==
Date	Opponent	Site	Result	Attendance	Source
September 25	Mercer*	Sanford Field; Athens, GA	W 20–0	4,500	
October 2	at Virginia	Lambeth Field; Charlottesville, VA	W 21–0		
October 9	at Yale*	Yale Bowl; New Haven, CT	L 0–10		
October 16	Furman*	Sanford Field; Athens, GA	L 7–14		
October 23	at Vanderbilt	Dudley Field; Nashville, TN (rivalry)	L 13–14		
October 30	Florida^{†}	Sanford Field; Athens, GA (rivalry)	W 32–9		
November 6	vs. Auburn	Memorial Stadium; Columbus, GA (rivalry)	W 16–6		
November 13	at Georgia Tech	Grant Field; Atlanta, GA (rivalry)	W 14–13		
November 25	at Alabama	Rickwood Field; Birmingham, AL (rivalry)	L 6–33	17,000	
*Non-conference game; ^{†}Homecoming
