= 1926 Ole Miss Rebels football team =

American college football season

1926 Ole Miss Rebels football
- Conference: Southern Conference
- Record: 5–4 (2–2 SoCon)
- Head coach: Homer Hazel (2nd season)
- Home stadium: Hemingway Stadium

1926 Southern Conference football standings
	Conf.					Overall
Team	W		L		T	W		L		T
No. 7 Alabama $	8	–	0	–	0	9	–	0	–	1
Tennessee	5	–	1	–	0	8	–	1	–	0
Vanderbilt	4	–	1	–	0	8	–	1	–	0
South Carolina	4	–	2	–	0	6	–	4	–	0
Georgia	4	–	2	–	0	5	–	4	–	0
Virginia	4	–	2	–	1	6	–	2	–	2
VPI	3	–	2	–	1	5	–	3	–	1
Washington and Lee	3	–	2	–	1	4	–	3	–	2
Georgia Tech	4	–	3	–	0	4	–	5	–	0
North Carolina	3	–	3	–	0	4	–	5	–	0
Auburn	3	–	3	–	0	5	–	4	–	0
LSU	3	–	3	–	0	6	–	3	–	0
Ole Miss	2	–	2	–	0	5	–	4	–	0
Mississippi A&M	2	–	3	–	0	5	–	4	–	0
VMI	2	–	4	–	0	5	–	5	–	0
Tulane	2	–	4	–	0	3	–	5	–	1
Maryland	1	–	3	–	1	5	–	4	–	1
Clemson	1	–	3	–	0	2	–	7	–	0
Florida	1	–	4	–	1	2	–	6	–	2
Kentucky	1	–	4	–	1	2	–	6	–	1
NC State	0	–	4	–	0	4	–	6	–	0
Sewanee	0	–	5	–	0	2	–	6	–	0
$ – Conference champion; Rankings from Dickinson System

The 1926 Ole Miss Rebels football team was an American football team that represented the University of Mississippi in the Southern Conference during the 1926 college football season. In its second season under head coach Homer Hazel, the team compiled a 5–4 record (2–2 against conference opponents). The team played its home games at Hemingway Stadium in Oxford, Mississippi

The team beat Florida and rival Mississippi A&M. Ap Applewhite and Thad Vann were on the team.

== Schedule ==
Date	Opponent	Site	Result	Source
September 25	Jonesboro A&M*	Hemingway Stadium; Oxford, MS	W 28–0	
October 2	at Arkansas*	The Hill; Fayetteville, AR (rivalry)	L 6–21	
October 9	Florida	Hemingway Stadium; Oxford, MS	W 12–7	
October 16	Loyola (IL)*	Hemingway Stadium; Oxford, MS	W 13–7	
October 23	at Drake*	Drake Stadium; Des Moines, IA	L 15–33	
October 30	at Tulane	Tulane Stadium; New Orleans, LA	L 0–6	
November 6	at Southwestern (TN)*	Fargason Field; Memphis, TN	W 32–27	
November 13	at LSU	Tiger Stadium; Baton Rouge, LA (rivalry)	L 0–3	
November 25	at Mississippi A&M	Scott Field; Starkville, MS (rivalry)	W 7–6	
*Non-conference game
