= 1926 Mississippi A&M Aggies football team =

American college football season

1926 Mississippi A&M Aggies football
- Conference: Southern Conference
- Record: 5–4 (2–3 SoCon)
- Head coach: Bernie Bierman (2nd season)
- Home stadium: Scott Field

1926 Southern Conference football standings
	Conf.					Overall
Team	W		L		T	W		L		T
No. 7 Alabama $	8	–	0	–	0	9	–	0	–	1
Tennessee	5	–	1	–	0	8	–	1	–	0
Vanderbilt	4	–	1	–	0	8	–	1	–	0
South Carolina	4	–	2	–	0	6	–	4	–	0
Georgia	4	–	2	–	0	5	–	4	–	0
Virginia	4	–	2	–	1	6	–	2	–	2
VPI	3	–	2	–	1	5	–	3	–	1
Washington and Lee	3	–	2	–	1	4	–	3	–	2
Georgia Tech	4	–	3	–	0	4	–	5	–	0
North Carolina	3	–	3	–	0	4	–	5	–	0
Auburn	3	–	3	–	0	5	–	4	–	0
LSU	3	–	3	–	0	6	–	3	–	0
Ole Miss	2	–	2	–	0	5	–	4	–	0
Mississippi A&M	2	–	3	–	0	5	–	4	–	0
VMI	2	–	4	–	0	5	–	5	–	0
Tulane	2	–	4	–	0	3	–	5	–	1
Maryland	1	–	3	–	1	5	–	4	–	1
Clemson	1	–	3	–	0	2	–	7	–	0
Florida	1	–	4	–	1	2	–	6	–	2
Kentucky	1	–	4	–	1	2	–	6	–	1
NC State	0	–	4	–	0	4	–	6	–	0
Sewanee	0	–	5	–	0	2	–	6	–	0
$ – Conference champion; Rankings from Dickinson System

The 1926 Mississippi A&M Aggies football team was an American football team that represented the Agricultural and Mechanical College of the State of Mississippi (now known as Mississippi State University) as a member of the Southern Conference (SoCon) during the 1926 college football season. In their second season under head coach Bernie Bierman, Mississippi A&M compiled a 5–4 record.

== Schedule ==
Date	Opponent	Site	Result	Source
September 25	at Birmingham–Southern*	Munger Bowl; Birmingham, AL	W 19–7	
October 2	Mississippi College*	Scott Field; Starkville, MS	W 41–0	
October 9	Alabama	Meridian Fairgrounds; Meridian, MS (rivalry)	L 7–26	
October 16	Millsaps*	Scott Field; Starkville, MS	W 34–0	
October 23	LSU	State Fairgrounds; Jackson, MS (rivalry)	W 7–6	
October 30	Tennessee	Scott Field; Starkville, MS	L 0–33	
November 6	at Tulane	Tulane Stadium; New Orleans, LA	W 14–0	
November 13	at Indiana*	Memorial Stadium; Bloomington, IN	L 6–19	
November 25	Ole Miss	Scott Field; Starkville, MS (rivalry)	L 6–7	
*Non-conference game
