= 1926 LSU Tigers football team =

American college football season

1926 LSU Tigers football
- Conference: Southern Conference
- Record: 6–3 (3–3 SoCon)
- Head coach: Mike Donahue (4th season)
- Captain: Babe Godfrey
- Home stadium: Tiger Stadium

1926 Southern Conference football standings
	Conf.					Overall
Team	W		L		T	W		L		T
No. 7 Alabama $	8	–	0	–	0	9	–	0	–	1
Tennessee	5	–	1	–	0	8	–	1	–	0
Vanderbilt	4	–	1	–	0	8	–	1	–	0
South Carolina	4	–	2	–	0	6	–	4	–	0
Georgia	4	–	2	–	0	5	–	4	–	0
Virginia	4	–	2	–	1	6	–	2	–	2
VPI	3	–	2	–	1	5	–	3	–	1
Washington and Lee	3	–	2	–	1	4	–	3	–	2
Georgia Tech	4	–	3	–	0	4	–	5	–	0
North Carolina	3	–	3	–	0	4	–	5	–	0
Auburn	3	–	3	–	0	5	–	4	–	0
LSU	3	–	3	–	0	6	–	3	–	0
Ole Miss	2	–	2	–	0	5	–	4	–	0
Mississippi A&M	2	–	3	–	0	5	–	4	–	0
VMI	2	–	4	–	0	5	–	5	–	0
Tulane	2	–	4	–	0	3	–	5	–	1
Maryland	1	–	3	–	1	5	–	4	–	1
Clemson	1	–	3	–	0	2	–	7	–	0
Florida	1	–	4	–	1	2	–	6	–	2
Kentucky	1	–	4	–	1	2	–	6	–	1
NC State	0	–	4	–	0	4	–	6	–	0
Sewanee	0	–	5	–	0	2	–	6	–	0
$ – Conference champion; Rankings from Dickinson System

The 1926 LSU Tigers football team represented Louisiana State University (LSU) during the 1926 college football season as a member of the Southern Conference (SoCon). The Tigers were led by head coach Mike Donahue in his fourth season and finished with a record of six wins and three losses (6–3 overall, 3–3 in the SoCon).

== Schedule ==
Date	Opponent	Site	Result	Source
September 25	Louisiana Normal*	Tiger Stadium; Baton Rouge, LA	W 47–0	
October 2	Southwestern Louisiana*	Tiger Stadium; Baton Rouge, LA	W 34–0	
October 9	Tennessee	Tiger Stadium; Baton Rouge, LA	L 7–14	
October 16	at Auburn	Cramton Bowl; Montgomery, AL (rivalry)	W 10–0	
October 23	at Mississippi A&M	State Fairgrounds; Jackson, MS (rivalry)	L 6–7	
October 30	at Alabama	Denny Field; Tuscaloosa, AL (rivalry)	L 0–24	
November 6	vs. Arkansas*	State Fair Stadium; Shreveport, LA (rivalry)	W 14–0	
November 13	Ole Miss^{†}	Tiger Stadium; Baton Rouge, LA (rivalry)	W 3–0	
November 25	at Tulane	Tulane Stadium; New Orleans, LA (Battle for the Rag)	W 7–0	
*Non-conference game; ^{†}Homecoming
