= 1926 Kentucky Wildcats football team =

American college football season

1926 Kentucky Wildcats football
- Conference: Southern Conference
- Record: 2–6–1 (1–4–1 SoCon)
- Head coach: Fred J. Murphy (3rd season)
- Captain: Frank Smith
- Home stadium: Stoll Field

1926 Southern Conference football standings
	Conf.					Overall
Team	W		L		T	W		L		T
No. 7 Alabama $	8	–	0	–	0	9	–	0	–	1
Tennessee	5	–	1	–	0	8	–	1	–	0
Vanderbilt	4	–	1	–	0	8	–	1	–	0
South Carolina	4	–	2	–	0	6	–	4	–	0
Georgia	4	–	2	–	0	5	–	4	–	0
Virginia	4	–	2	–	1	6	–	2	–	2
VPI	3	–	2	–	1	5	–	3	–	1
Washington and Lee	3	–	2	–	1	4	–	3	–	2
Georgia Tech	4	–	3	–	0	4	–	5	–	0
North Carolina	3	–	3	–	0	4	–	5	–	0
Auburn	3	–	3	–	0	5	–	4	–	0
LSU	3	–	3	–	0	6	–	3	–	0
Ole Miss	2	–	2	–	0	5	–	4	–	0
Mississippi A&M	2	–	3	–	0	5	–	4	–	0
VMI	2	–	4	–	0	5	–	5	–	0
Tulane	2	–	4	–	0	3	–	5	–	1
Maryland	1	–	3	–	1	5	–	4	–	1
Clemson	1	–	3	–	0	2	–	7	–	0
Florida	1	–	4	–	1	2	–	6	–	2
Kentucky	1	–	4	–	1	2	–	6	–	1
NC State	0	–	4	–	0	4	–	6	–	0
Sewanee	0	–	5	–	0	2	–	6	–	0
$ – Conference champion; Rankings from Dickinson System

The 1926 Kentucky Wildcats football team was an American football team that represented the University of Kentucky as a member of the Southern Conference (SoCon) during the 1926 season. In its third and final season under head coach Fred J. Murphy, Kentucky compiled an overall record of 2–6–1 with a mark of 1–4–1 in conference play, tying for 19th place in the SoCon.

== Schedule ==
Date	Opponent	Site	Result	Source
October 2	Maryville (TN)*	Stoll Field; Lexington, KY	W 25–0	
October 9	at Indiana*	Memorial Stadium; Bloomington, IN (rivalry)	L 6–14	
October 16	Washington and Lee	Stoll Field; Lexington, KY	L 13–14	
October 23	at Florida	Durkee Field; Jacksonville, FL (rivalry)	W 18–13	
October 30	VPI	Stoll Field; Lexington, KY	T 13–13	
November 6	at Alabama	Rickwood Field; Birmingham, AL	L 0–14	
November 13	vs. VMI	Laidley Field; Charleston, WV	L 9–10	
November 20	Centre*	Stoll Field; Lexington, KY (rivalry)	L 0–7	
November 25	at Tennessee	Shields–Watkins Field; Knoxville, TN (rivalry)	L 0–6	
*Non-conference game
