= Lamar Sarra =

American football and basketball player and coach (1904–1995)

Florida Gators
- Position: Center

Personal information
- Born: September 11, 1904; Florida, U.S.
- Died: May 24, 1995 (aged 90); Jacksonville, Florida, U.S.

Career information
- High school: Gainesville
- College: Florida (1925–1926)

Awards and highlights
- University of Florida Athletic Hall of Fame

Ernest Lamar Sarra (September 11, 1904 – May 24, 1995) was an American football and basketball player and coach. Sarra was a prominent center for coach Tom Sebring's Florida Gators football team, captain of the 1926 team. He was a three-year football star and played four seasons of basketball. Sarra was then the coach of the Plant Panthers in the 1930s. He was once chairman of the governor's committee on school building construction. He played high school football at Gainesville High under Rex Farrior.

== See also ==
- List of University of Florida Athletic Hall of Fame members
