= 1926 Washington and Lee Generals football team =

American college football season

1926 Washington and Lee Generals football
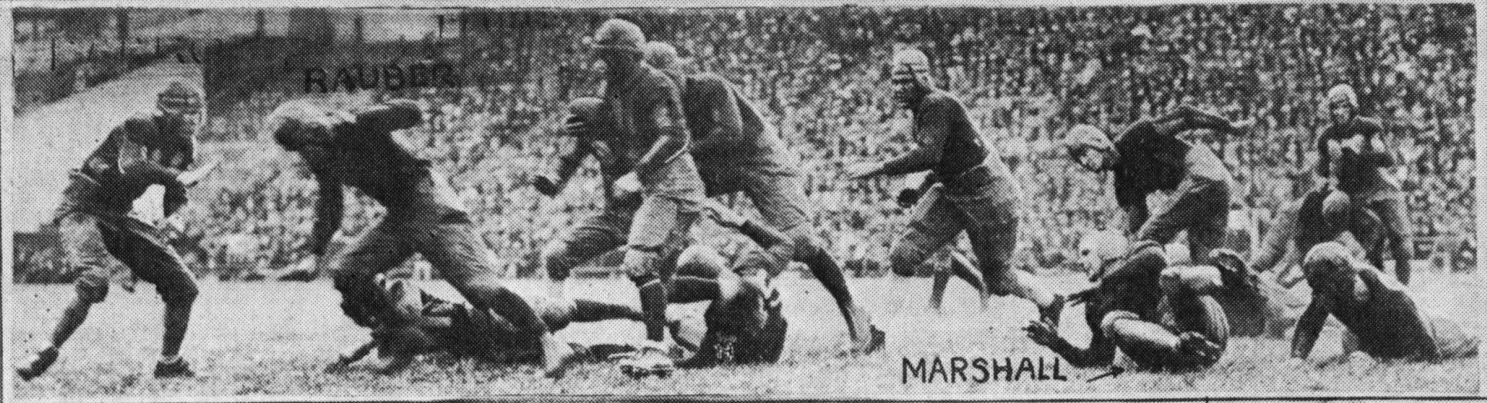
- Conference: Southern Conference
- Record: 4–3–2 (3–2–1 SoCon)
- Head coach: James P. Herron (1st season)
- Captain: Ty Rauber
- Home stadium: Wilson Field

1926 Southern Conference football standings
	Conf.					Overall
Team	W		L		T	W		L		T
No. 7 Alabama $	8	–	0	–	0	9	–	0	–	1
Tennessee	5	–	1	–	0	8	–	1	–	0
Vanderbilt	4	–	1	–	0	8	–	1	–	0
South Carolina	4	–	2	–	0	6	–	4	–	0
Georgia	4	–	2	–	0	5	–	4	–	0
Virginia	4	–	2	–	1	6	–	2	–	2
VPI	3	–	2	–	1	5	–	3	–	1
Washington and Lee	3	–	2	–	1	4	–	3	–	2
Georgia Tech	4	–	3	–	0	4	–	5	–	0
North Carolina	3	–	3	–	0	4	–	5	–	0
Auburn	3	–	3	–	0	5	–	4	–	0
LSU	3	–	3	–	0	6	–	3	–	0
Ole Miss	2	–	2	–	0	5	–	4	–	0
Mississippi A&M	2	–	3	–	0	5	–	4	–	0
VMI	2	–	4	–	0	5	–	5	–	0
Tulane	2	–	4	–	0	3	–	5	–	1
Maryland	1	–	3	–	1	5	–	4	–	1
Clemson	1	–	3	–	0	2	–	7	–	0
Florida	1	–	4	–	1	2	–	6	–	2
Kentucky	1	–	4	–	1	2	–	6	–	1
NC State	0	–	4	–	0	4	–	6	–	0
Sewanee	0	–	5	–	0	2	–	6	–	0
$ – Conference champion; Rankings from Dickinson System

The 1926 Washington and Lee Generals football team was an American football team that represented Washington and Lee University as a member of the Southern Conference (SoCon) during the 1926 college football season. In their first season under head coach James P. Herron, Washington and Lee compiled a 4–3–2 record. Fullback Ty Rauber was All-Southern and third team AP All-America, the school's first player to make any All-America team.

== Schedule ==
Date	Opponent	Site	Result	Source
September 25	Lynchburg*	Wilson Field; Lexington, VA	W 35–0	
October 2	vs. West Virginia*	Laidley Field; Charleston, WV	L 0–18	
October 9	at Princeton*	Palmer Stadium; Princeton, NJ	T 7–7	
October 16	at Kentucky	Stoll Field; Lexington, KY	W 14–13	
October 23	at Georgia Tech	Grant Field; Atlanta, GA	L 7–19	
November 6	at Virginia	Lambeth Field; Charlottesville, VA	L 7–30	
November 13	vs. VPI	Municipal Stadium; Lynchburg, VA	W 13–0	
November 20	Maryland	Wilson Field; Lexington, VA	W 3–0	
November 25	vs. Florida	Durkee Field; Jacksonville, FL	T 7–7	
*Non-conference game

== Coaching staff ==
- Head coach: James P. Herron
- Assistant coach: James Kay Thomas
