= 1926 Auburn Tigers football team =

American college football season

1926 Auburn Tigers football
- Conference: Southern Conference
- Record: 5–4 (3–3 SoCon)
- Head coach: Dave Morey (2nd season)
- Home stadium: Drake Field; Rickwood Field; Cramton Bowl

1926 Southern Conference football standings
	Conf.					Overall
Team	W		L		T	W		L		T
No. 7 Alabama $	8	–	0	–	0	9	–	0	–	1
Tennessee	5	–	1	–	0	8	–	1	–	0
Vanderbilt	4	–	1	–	0	8	–	1	–	0
South Carolina	4	–	2	–	0	6	–	4	–	0
Georgia	4	–	2	–	0	5	–	4	–	0
Virginia	4	–	2	–	1	6	–	2	–	2
VPI	3	–	2	–	1	5	–	3	–	1
Washington and Lee	3	–	2	–	1	4	–	3	–	2
Georgia Tech	4	–	3	–	0	4	–	5	–	0
North Carolina	3	–	3	–	0	4	–	5	–	0
Auburn	3	–	3	–	0	5	–	4	–	0
LSU	3	–	3	–	0	6	–	3	–	0
Ole Miss	2	–	2	–	0	5	–	4	–	0
Mississippi A&M	2	–	3	–	0	5	–	4	–	0
VMI	2	–	4	–	0	5	–	5	–	0
Tulane	2	–	4	–	0	3	–	5	–	1
Maryland	1	–	3	–	1	5	–	4	–	1
Clemson	1	–	3	–	0	2	–	7	–	0
Florida	1	–	4	–	1	2	–	6	–	2
Kentucky	1	–	4	–	1	2	–	6	–	1
NC State	0	–	4	–	0	4	–	6	–	0
Sewanee	0	–	5	–	0	2	–	6	–	0
$ – Conference champion; Rankings from Dickinson System

The 1926 Auburn Tigers football team represented Auburn University in the 1926 college football season. The Tigers were led by head coach Dave Morey in his second season and finished the season with a record of five wins and four losses (5–4 overall, 3–3 in the SoCon).

== Schedule ==
Date	Opponent	Site	Result	Source
September 25	Chattanooga*	Drake Field; Auburn, AL	W 15–6	
October 2	Clemson^{†}	Drake Field; Auburn, AL (rivalry)	W 47–0	
October 9	at Howard (AL)*	Rickwood Field; Birmingham, AL	W 33–14	
October 16	LSU	Cramton Bowl; Montgomery, AL (rivalry)	L 0–10	
October 23	at Tulane	Tulane Stadium; New Orleans, LA (rivalry)	W 2–0	
October 30	Sewanee	Cramton Bowl; Montgomery, AL	W 9–0	
November 6	vs. Georgia	Memorial Stadium; Columbus, GA (rivalry)	L 6–16	
November 13	Marquette*	Rickwood Field; Birmingham, AL	L 3–19	
November 25	at Georgia Tech	Grant Field; Atlanta, GA (rivalry)	L 7–20	
*Non-conference game; ^{†}Homecoming
