= 1926 Tulane Green Wave football team =

American college football season

1926 Tulane Green Wave football
- Conference: Southern Conference
- Record: 3–5–1 (2–4 SoCon)
- Head coach: Clark Shaughnessy (11th season)
- Offensive scheme: Single-wing
- Captain: Harry P. Gamble
- Home stadium: Tulane Stadium

Uniform
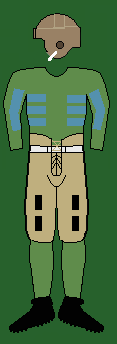

1926 Southern Conference football standings
	Conf.					Overall
Team	W		L		T	W		L		T
No. 7 Alabama $	8	–	0	–	0	9	–	0	–	1
Tennessee	5	–	1	–	0	8	–	1	–	0
Vanderbilt	4	–	1	–	0	8	–	1	–	0
South Carolina	4	–	2	–	0	6	–	4	–	0
Georgia	4	–	2	–	0	5	–	4	–	0
Virginia	4	–	2	–	1	6	–	2	–	2
VPI	3	–	2	–	1	5	–	3	–	1
Washington and Lee	3	–	2	–	1	4	–	3	–	2
Georgia Tech	4	–	3	–	0	4	–	5	–	0
North Carolina	3	–	3	–	0	4	–	5	–	0
Auburn	3	–	3	–	0	5	–	4	–	0
LSU	3	–	3	–	0	6	–	3	–	0
Ole Miss	2	–	2	–	0	5	–	4	–	0
Mississippi A&M	2	–	3	–	0	5	–	4	–	0
VMI	2	–	4	–	0	5	–	5	–	0
Tulane	2	–	4	–	0	3	–	5	–	1
Maryland	1	–	3	–	1	5	–	4	–	1
Clemson	1	–	3	–	0	2	–	7	–	0
Florida	1	–	4	–	1	2	–	6	–	2
Kentucky	1	–	4	–	1	2	–	6	–	1
NC State	0	–	4	–	0	4	–	6	–	0
Sewanee	0	–	5	–	0	2	–	6	–	0
$ – Conference champion; Rankings from Dickinson System

The 1926 Tulane Green Wave football team was an American football team that represented Tulane University as a member of the Southern Conference (SoCon) during the 1926 college football season. In its 11th and final season under head coach Clark Shaughnessy, Tulane compiled a 3–5–1 record (2–4 in conference games), tied for 15th place in the SoCon, and outscored opponents by a total of 71 to 60.

Spirits were high to begin the season as Milton Levy was the only member of the 1925 line to leave, but the losses in the backfield of Lester Lautenschlaeger, Peggy Flournoy, and Fred Lamprecht proved to be costly. Captain Harry P. Gamble was All-Southern.

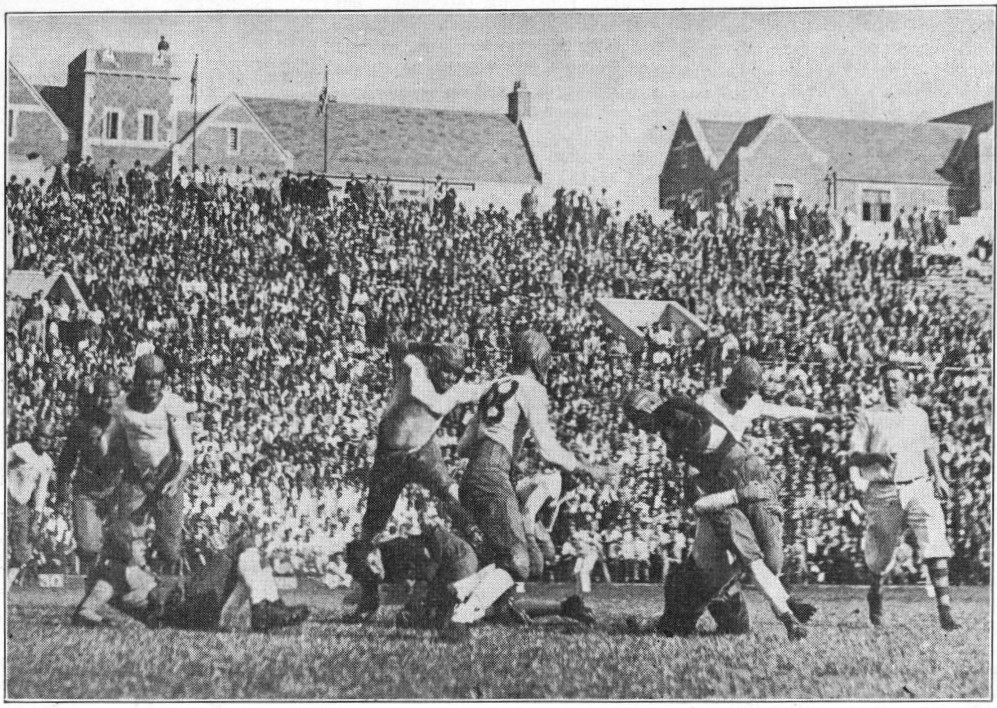
The Georgia Tech game at Grant Field

== Schedule ==
Date	Opponent	Site	Result	Attendance	Source
September 25	Louisiana Tech*	Tulane Stadium; New Orleans, LA	W 40–0	7,000	
October 2	at Missouri*	Memorial Stadium; Columbia, MO	T 0–0	10,000	
October 9	at Georgia Tech	Grant Field; Atlanta, GA	L 6–9		
October 16	at NYU*	Yankee Stadium; Bronx, NY	L 0–21	25,000	
October 23	Auburn	Tulane Stadium; New Orleans, LA (rivalry)	L 0–2		
October 30	Ole Miss	Tulane Stadium; New Orleans, LA (rivalry)	W 6–0		
November 6	Mississippi A&M	Tulane Stadium; New Orleans, LA	L 0–14		
November 13	Sewanee	Tulane Stadium; New Orleans, LA	W 19–7		
November 25	LSU	Tulane Stadium; New Orleans, LA (Battle for the Rag)	L 0–7	25,000	
*Non-conference game
