= 1926 Vanderbilt Commodores football team =

American college football season

1926 Vanderbilt Commodores football
- Conference: Southern Conference
- Record: 8–1 (4–1 SoCon)
- Head coach: Dan McGugin (22nd season)
- Captain: Neil Cargile
- Home stadium: Dudley Field

Uniform
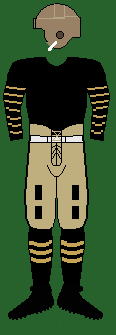

1926 Southern Conference football standings
	Conf.					Overall
Team	W		L		T	W		L		T
No. 7 Alabama $	8	–	0	–	0	9	–	0	–	1
Tennessee	5	–	1	–	0	8	–	1	–	0
Vanderbilt	4	–	1	–	0	8	–	1	–	0
South Carolina	4	–	2	–	0	6	–	4	–	0
Georgia	4	–	2	–	0	5	–	4	–	0
Virginia	4	–	2	–	1	6	–	2	–	2
VPI	3	–	2	–	1	5	–	3	–	1
Washington and Lee	3	–	2	–	1	4	–	3	–	2
Georgia Tech	4	–	3	–	0	4	–	5	–	0
North Carolina	3	–	3	–	0	4	–	5	–	0
Auburn	3	–	3	–	0	5	–	4	–	0
LSU	3	–	3	–	0	6	–	3	–	0
Ole Miss	2	–	2	–	0	5	–	4	–	0
Mississippi A&M	2	–	3	–	0	5	–	4	–	0
VMI	2	–	4	–	0	5	–	5	–	0
Tulane	2	–	4	–	0	3	–	5	–	1
Maryland	1	–	3	–	1	5	–	4	–	1
Clemson	1	–	3	–	0	2	–	7	–	0
Florida	1	–	4	–	1	2	–	6	–	2
Kentucky	1	–	4	–	1	2	–	6	–	1
NC State	0	–	4	–	0	4	–	6	–	0
Sewanee	0	–	5	–	0	2	–	6	–	0
$ – Conference champion; Rankings from Dickinson System

The 1926 Vanderbilt Commodores football team represented Vanderbilt University during the 1926 college football season. The team's head coach was Dan McGugin, who served his 22nd season as the Commodores' head coach. Commodores had eight wins and lost only one to Alabama, who was named a national champion. Vanderbilt was a member of the Southern Conference, and went 4–1 in conference play. The Commodores played their eight home games at Dudley Field in Nashville, Tennessee. They also played one game in Dallas, Texas vs. Texas and one in Atlanta vs. Georgia Tech.

== Schedule ==
Date	Opponent	Site	Result	Attendance	Source
September 25	at Middle Tennessee State Teachers*	Dudley Field; Nashville, TN	W 69–0		
October 2	Alabama	Dudley Field; Nashville, TN	L 7–19	16,000	
October 9	Bryson College*	Dudley Field; Nashville, TN	W 48–0		
October 16	vs. Texas*	Fair Park Stadium; Dallas, TX	W 7–0		
October 23	Georgia	Dudley Field; Nashville, TN (rivalry)	W 14–13		
October 30	Southwestern (TN)*	Dudley Field; Nashville, TN	W 50–0		
November 6	at Georgia Tech	Grant Field; Atlanta, GA (rivalry)	W 13–7		
November 13	Tennessee	Dudley Field; Nashville, TN (rivalry)	W 20–3		
November 25	Sewanee	Dudley Field; Nashville, TN (rivalry)	W 13–0		
*Non-conference game

== Awards and honors ==
- All-Southern: Bill Spears; Ox McKibbon

== Coaching staff ==
- Dan McGugin (Michigan '03), head coach
- Josh Cody (Vanderbilt '19), assistant coach
- Lewie Hardage (Vanderbilt '12), backfield coach
- Hek Wakefield (Vanderbilt '24), end coach
- John Weibel (Notre Dame '25), line coach
