= 1926 Tennessee Volunteers football team =

American college football season

1926 Tennessee Volunteers football
- Conference: Southern Conference
- Record: 8–1 (5–1 SoCon)
- Head coach: Robert Neyland (1st season)
- Offensive scheme: Single-wing
- Captain: Billy Harkness
- Home stadium: Shields–Watkins Field

1926 Southern Conference football standings
	Conf.					Overall
Team	W		L		T	W		L		T
No. 7 Alabama $	8	–	0	–	0	9	–	0	–	1
Tennessee	5	–	1	–	0	8	–	1	–	0
Vanderbilt	4	–	1	–	0	8	–	1	–	0
South Carolina	4	–	2	–	0	6	–	4	–	0
Georgia	4	–	2	–	0	5	–	4	–	0
Virginia	4	–	2	–	1	6	–	2	–	2
VPI	3	–	2	–	1	5	–	3	–	1
Washington and Lee	3	–	2	–	1	4	–	3	–	2
Georgia Tech	4	–	3	–	0	4	–	5	–	0
North Carolina	3	–	3	–	0	4	–	5	–	0
Auburn	3	–	3	–	0	5	–	4	–	0
LSU	3	–	3	–	0	6	–	3	–	0
Ole Miss	2	–	2	–	0	5	–	4	–	0
Mississippi A&M	2	–	3	–	0	5	–	4	–	0
VMI	2	–	4	–	0	5	–	5	–	0
Tulane	2	–	4	–	0	3	–	5	–	1
Maryland	1	–	3	–	1	5	–	4	–	1
Clemson	1	–	3	–	0	2	–	7	–	0
Florida	1	–	4	–	1	2	–	6	–	2
Kentucky	1	–	4	–	1	2	–	6	–	1
NC State	0	–	4	–	0	4	–	6	–	0
Sewanee	0	–	5	–	0	2	–	6	–	0
$ – Conference champion; Rankings from Dickinson System

The 1926 Tennessee Volunteers football team (variously "Tennessee", "UT" or the "Vols") represented the University of Tennessee in the 1926 college football season. Playing as a member of the Southern Conference (SoCon), the team was led by head coach Robert Neyland, in his first year, and played their home games at Shields–Watkins Field in Knoxville, Tennessee. The 1926 Vols won eight and lost one game (8–1 overall, 5–1 in the SoCon). They won their first seven games of the season before losing to in-state rival, Vanderbilt. Tennessee outscored their opponents 151 to 34 and posted five shutouts.

== Schedule ==
Date	Opponent	Site	Result	Source
September 25	Carson–Newman*	Shields–Watkins Field; Knoxville, TN	W 13–0	
October 2	North Carolina	Shields–Watkins Field; Knoxville, TN	W 34–0	
October 9	at LSU	Tiger Stadium; Baton Rouge, LA	W 14–7	
October 16	Maryville (TN)*	Shields–Watkins Field; Knoxville, TN	W 6–0	
October 23	Centre*	Shields–Watkins Field; Knoxville, TN	W 30–7	
October 30	at Mississippi A&M	Scott Field; Starkville, MS	W 33–0	
November 6	Sewanee^{†}	Shields–Watkins Field; Knoxville, TN	W 12–0	
November 13	at Vanderbilt	Dudley Field; Nashville, TN (rivalry)	L 3–20	
November 25	Kentucky	Shields–Watkins Field; Knoxville, TN (rivalry)	W 6–0	
*Non-conference game; ^{†}Homecoming
