= John C. McAvoy =

American football player and coach

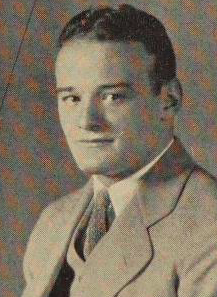
- McAvoy, c. 1928

Biographical details
- Born: November 15, 1905; Perkiomen Junction, Pennsylvania, U.S.
- Died: February 21, 1995 (aged 89); Pennsylvania, U.S.
- Education: Dartmouth (1928)

Playing career
- 1925–1927: Dartmouth
- Position: Left end

Coaching career (HC unless noted)
- 1931–1937: Ursinus

Head coaching record
- Overall: 26–26–10

Accomplishments and honors

Championships
- 2 Eastern Pennsylvania Collegiate (1931–1932)

John Creighton McAvoy (November 15, 1905 – February 21, 1995) was an American college football player and coach.

McAvoy played varsity football for the Dartmouth Big Green football team from 1925 through 1927 (including the undefeated 1925 team), and was a member of the class of 1928. He served as the head football coach at Ursinus College in Collegeville, Pennsylvania, from 1931 to 1937, compiling a record of 26–26–10. McAvoy died in 1995 at age 89; he was survived by one son and three daughters.

== Head coaching record ==
| Year | Team | Overall | Conference | Standing | Bowl/playoffs |
|---|---|---|---|---|---|
Ursinus Bears (Eastern Pennsylvania Collegiate Conference) (1931–1937)
| 1931 | Ursinus | 6–2–1 | 3–0–1 | 1st | |
| 1932 | Ursinus | 4–3–1 | 2–1–1 | T–1st | |
| 1933 | Ursinus | 4–3–2 | 1–2–1 | 4th | |
| 1934 | Ursinus | 3–3–3 | 1–1–2 | 3rd | |
| 1935 | Ursinus | 3–6 | 3–1 | 2nd | |
| 1936 | Ursinus | 3–4–2 | 2–0–2 | 2nd | |
| 1937 | Ursinus | 3–5–1 | 1–3 | 5th | |
| Ursinus: | | 26–26–10 | 13–8–7 | | |
| Total: | | 26–26–10 | | | |
National championship Conference title Conference division title or championship game berth
