= Hilton Village, Virginia =

Unincorporated community in Virginia, US

Coordinates: 37°5′5″N 80°47′11″W

Hilton Village is an unincorporated community in Pulaski County, in the U.S. state of Virginia.
