= Ty Rauber =

American football player, Navy Commander, and special agent

- Born: Louis Joseph Rauber; September 8, 1905; Wellsville, New York, U.S.
- Died: January 29, 1949 (aged 43); Guam
- Other name: Ty
- Occupation: FBI agent
- Football career

Washington & Lee Generals
- Position: Fullback
- Class: 1927

Personal information
- Listed height: 5 ft 10 in (1.78 m)
- Listed weight: 170 lb (77 kg)

Career information
- High school: Central
- College: Washington & Lee (1924–1926)

Awards and highlights
- All-Southern (1926); Third-team All-American (1926); Washington & Lee Athletics Hall of Fame

Louis Joseph "Ty" Rauber (September 8, 1905 – January 29, 1949) was a college football player, Navy Commander, and special agent with the FBI.

== Early life ==
Rauber was born on September 8, 1905, in Wellsville, New York to John Rauber and Catherine Shaughnessy. He attended Central High School of Washington, D. C. and was captain of its 1923 football team.

== Washington & Lee ==
=== Football ===
Rauber was a prominent fullback for the Washington & Lee Generals of Washington & Lee University. He was the first Generals player to make an All-East team, and the first All-American.

==== 1925 ====
Against Princeton in 1925, Ty once punted the ball from his end zone into a gale of wind which blew the ball right back into his arms. The Tigers then threw him for a safety.

==== 1926 ====
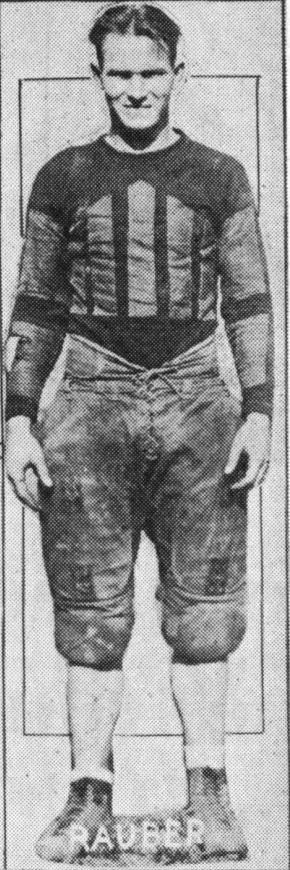
Rabuer as a member of the 1926 Washington and Lee Generals football team

Rauber received All-Southern selections in 1926; receiving the third most votes of any player just behind Hoyt Winslett and Bill Spears. He received a third-team All-American vote from the Associated Press.

== Navy ==
Rauber was a Commander with the Navy, serving as legal officer in charge of the land division, called to active duty in 1939. He later went overseas with naval intelligence.

== Later life ==
Rauber died in Guam of a heart attack after having fallen off a boat.

== See also ==
- 1926 College Football All-America Team
- 1926 College Football All-Southern Team
