= George Morton (American football) =

American football player

Profile
- Position: Halfback

Personal information
- Born: November 11, 1903; Athens, Georgia, U.S.
- Died: March 2, 1968 (aged 64); Tallahassee, Florida, U.S.

Career information
- High school: Episcopal (Alexandria, VA)
- College: Georgia (1924–1926)

Awards and highlights
- All-Southern (1926)

George Dudley Morton (November 11, 1903 – March 2, 1968) was an American college football player.

== Early life ==
George Dudley Morton was born in Athens, Georgia on November 11, 1903 to John White Morton and Mary Lou Hinton. Morton attended Episcopal High School in Alexandria, Virginia; at the time of his graduation called "the best all-round athlete that The High School has ever produced." He played football, baseball, track and basketball.

== College football ==
Morton was an All-Southern halfback for the Georgia Bulldogs of the University of Georgia, captain of its 1926 team. That year in the rivalry game at Grant Field with Georgia Tech, Georgia found itself down 13 to 0 at the half. Herdis McCrary and Morton led a comeback, winning 14 to 13. In the upset of Vanderbilt in 1925 Morton passed for a touchdown.

== Later life ==
Morton worked for the Francis I. du Pont Company. He died from a heart attack in Tallahassee, Florida on March 2, 1968.
