= Miles Stadium =

College football stadium

- Interactive map of Miles Stadium
- Location: Blacksburg, Virginia
- Coordinates: 37.225°N 80.419°W
- Owner: Virginia Tech
- Surface: Natural grass

Construction
- Opened: 1926
- Closed: 1964
- Demolished: 1965

Blacksburg (the United States)
Blacksburg (Virginia)

Miles Stadium was a college football stadium located on the campus of Virginia Polytechnic Institute and State University (Virginia Tech) in Blacksburg, Virginia. It was the home field of Virginia Tech's football team from 1926 to 1964, until the new Lane Stadium opened in 1965.

Miles Stadium opened in 1926 with 3,760 permanent seats. Subsequent expansions increased seating capacity to 17,000 permanent seats and temporary bleachers. The stadium's inaugural game was a victory over Roanoke College on September 25; four weeks later, the dedication game was a win over rival Virginia. The playing field was aligned northwest to southeast, at an approximate elevation of 2,050 feet (625 m) above sea level.

The stadium's last game was in 1964, a Virginia Tech victory over North Carolina State on November 7. The stadium was razed in 1965 and over the next thirty years the large grassy area became known as the "Prairie." In the 1990s, three new residence halls, Payne Hall, Peddrew-Yates Hall, and New Residence Hall East (together known as the "Prairie Quad") were built on the former site of Miles Stadium.

Of the 95 varsity football games played in the venue, Virginia Tech compiled a 66–25–4 (.716) record; the most memorable win was arguably in its final season, the 1964 homecoming defeat of Florida State on October 24. Undefeated FSU was ranked tenth in the nation, and was the highest-ranked team defeated at Miles Stadium. Virginia Tech did not defeat a higher ranked team until the 1995 win in the Sugar Bowl over #9 Texas on New Year's Eve.

Miles Stadium was named for Clarence P. "Sally" Miles, Virginia Tech class of 1901, former director of athletics, graduate athletic manager, professor, and dean. Virginia Tech's Miles residence hall is also named for C.P. Miles.
