= Melton Field =

Sports stadium in South Carolina, US

- Owner: University of South Carolina
- Capacity: 7,000

Construction
- Opened: 1926
- Closed: 1933

Melton Field was built on the campus of the University of South Carolina in 1926 and named in honor of the university's former president, William Davis Melton. It served as the primary home of the University of South Carolina Gamecocks football team from 1926 until Columbia Municipal Stadium was built in 1934. The Gamecocks generally played home games at Melton Field except for their annual game against Clemson, which was played at a 15,000 seat wooden stadium at Columbia's fairgrounds.

The site is currently occupied by the Russell House University Union and the Callcott Social Sciences Center on the University of South Carolina's main campus.
