= Tate Field =

Former athletic stadium in Richmond, Virginia

- Former names: Island Park (1890s); Mayo Island Park (1920s)
- Location: Richmond, Virginia, U.S.
- Owner: Eddie Mooers (1941)
- Capacity: 6,000 (1926)

Construction
- Opened: 1890
- Closed: 1941

Tenants
- Richmond Colts (1921–1941); Richmond Spiders football (1891–1893, 1925–1928); Richmond Rebels (Virginia-Carolina Football League) (1937)

Tate Field, known as Island Park in the 1890s and Mayo Island Park prior to 1926, was a stadium located on Mayo Island in the James River within the city of Richmond, Virginia. It hosted sporting events including college football and Minor League Baseball. Tate Field served as the home field for the Richmond Colts of the Virginia League, Eastern League, and Piedmont League from 1921 to 1941 and the Richmond Spiders football team of the University of Richmond from 1925 to 1928.

Island Park first opened on March 24, 1890 for a baseball game between the Richmonds and the Baltimore Orioles of the American Association. In 1926, Mayo Island Park was renamed as Tate Field in honor of Pop Tate, a Richmond native who had played Major League Baseball from 1885 to 1890.

In the 1920s and 1930s, Tate Field often flooded. In 1924, it was destroyed by fire. On the evening of May 24, 1941, Tate Field sustained another fire, which destroyed the grandstand and a portion of the right field bleachers. Eddie Mooers, who owned the ball park and the Richmond Colts, estimated the damage at $25,000.
