= 1925 Tennessee State football team =

American college football season

1925 Tennessee State football
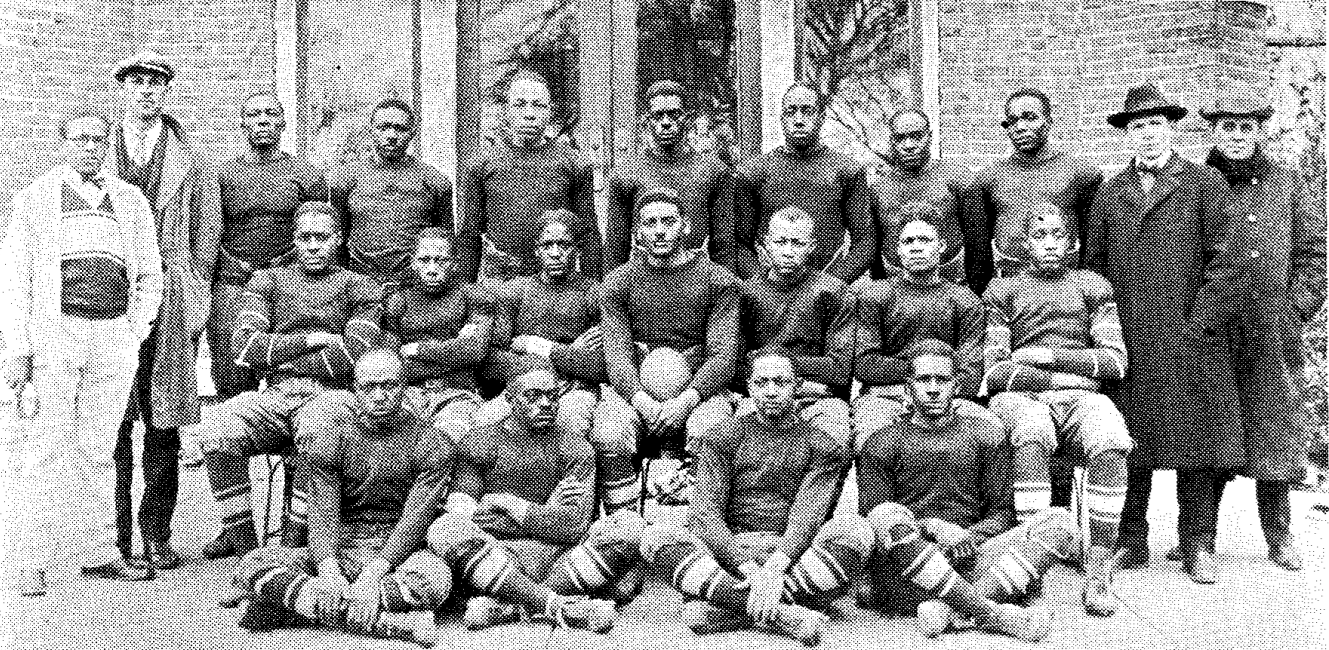
- Conference: Independent
- Record: 4–1
- Head coach: George Davenport (1st season)
- Captain: Guy E. Hoffman
- Home stadium: Athletic Park

1925 Southern college football independents records
	Conf.			Overall
Team	W	L	T	W		L		T
Louisville		–		8	–	0	–	0
Georgetown		–		9	–	1	–	0
Howard		–		6	–	0	–	2
Tennessee State		–		4	–	1	–	0
Texas Mines		–		5	–	1	–	1
Texas Tech		–		6	–	1	–	2
Stetson		–		6	–	2	–	1
Wake Forest		–		6	–	2	–	1
Davidson		–		6	–	2	–	2
George Washington		–		6	–	2	–	2
Navy		–		5	–	2	–	1
Texas A&I		–		4	–	2	–	1
William & Mary		–		6	–	4	–	0
Catholic University		–		4	–	4	–	0
Delaware		–		4	–	4	–	0
Spring Hill		–		4	–	4	–	0
Tennessee Docs		–		5	–	5	–	0
Duke		–		4	–	5	–	0
Middle Tennessee State Teachers		–		3	–	4	–	2
East Tennessee State Teachers		–		3	–	4	–	0
Western Kentucky State Normal		–		3	–	5	–	1
Georgia Normal		–		1	–	2	–	0
Richmond		–		3	–	6	–	0
Loyola (MD)		–		2	–	6	–	0
Delaware State		–		0	–	2	–	0
Mississippi State Teachers		–		0	–	6	–	0
West Tennessee State Teachers		–		0	–	7	–	1

The 1925 Tennessee State football team represented Tennessee Agricultural & Industrial State Normal College—now known as Tennessee State University—an independent during the 1925 college football season. Led by first-year head coach George Davenport, Tennessee State compiled a record of 4–1.

== Schedule ==
Date	Time	Opponent	Site	Result	Source
October 29		Walden (TN)	Athletic Park; Nashville, TN	W 19–7	
November 7		Morris Brown	Nashville, TN	W 14–7	
November 14		Roger Williams (TN)	Athletic Park; Nashville, TN	W 13–0	
November 28		Simmons (KY)	Nashville, TN	W 12–7	
December 5	8:30 p.m.	Fisk	Athletic Park; Nashville, TN	L 6–10	
All times are in Central time
