= List of Texas Tech Red Raiders football captains =

The Texas Tech Red Raiders are an American football team who represent Texas Tech University in Lubbock, Texas, United States.

== Team captains ==
| Team | Player | Position | Notes |
|---|---|---|---|
| 1925 | Windy Nicklaus | | — |
| 1926 | Herley Carpenter | | — |
| 1926 | Volney Hill | | — |
| 1927 | Bruce Reed | | — |
| 1928 | Ransom Walker | | — |
| 1929 | Sidney Knowles | | — |
| 1930 | Jack Durham | | — |
| 1931 | Jack Durham | | — |
| 1932 | Ross Ayers | | — |
| 1933 | Elva Baker | | — |
| 1934 | Malcom Martin | | — |
| 1935 | Walker Nichols | | — |
| 1936 | Demp Cannon | | — |
| 1937 | Lewis Jones | | — |
| 1937 | Herschel Ramsey | | — |
| 1938 | Frank Guzek | | — |
| 1938 | A. B. Murphy | | — |
| 1939 | Bill Davis | | — |
| 1939 | Dixie B. White | | — |
| 1940 | Ty Bain | | — |
| 1940 | Lonnie McCurry | | — |
| 1941 | Loyce Baliio | | — |
| 1941 | Ty Bain | | — |
| 1942 | Will Allbright | | — |
| 1942 | Kenneth Robbins | | — |
| 1943 | Game captains | | — |
| 1944 | Game captains | | — |
| 1945 | Walt Schlinkman | | — |
| 1945 | Otis Turner | | — |
| 1946 | James Reed | | — |
| 1946 | Roger Smith | | — |
| 1947 | Freddie Brown (American football) | | — |
| 1947 | Glen Lewis | | — |
| 1947 | Bernie Winkler | | — |
| 1948 | Ernest Hawkins (coach) | | — |
| 1948 | Bobby Williams | | — |
| 1949 | John Andrews | | — |
| 1949 | James Conley | | — |
| 1950 | Earl Jackson | | — |
| 1951 | Aubrey Phillips | | — |
| 1951 | Jerrell Price | | — |
| 1952 | Vernon Barron | | — |
| 1952 | Jim Turner (placekicker) | | — |
| 1953 | Don Gray | | — |
| 1953 | Victor Spooner | | — |
| 1954 | Howard Hurt | | — |
| 1954 | Jerry Johnson | | — |

== See also ==
- Captain (sports)
