= List of Delaware Fightin' Blue Hens men's basketball head coaches =

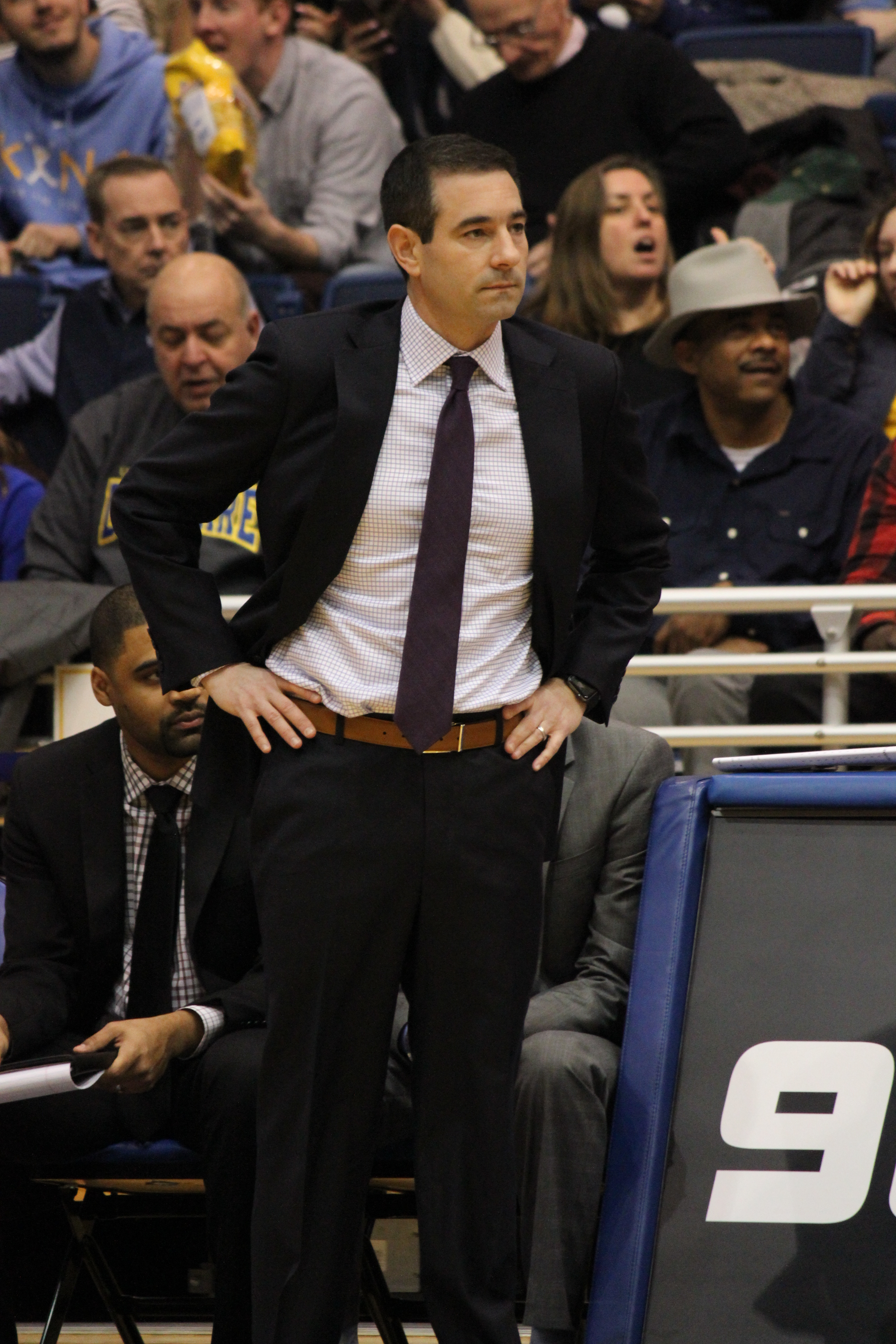
Martin Ingelsby, the current head coach of the Delaware Fightin' Blue Hens.

The following is a list of Delaware Fightin' Blue Hens men's basketball head coaches. There have been 24 head coaches of the Fightin' Blue Hens in their 118-season history.

Delaware's current head coach is Martin Ingelsby. He was hired as the Fightin' Blue Hens' head coach in May 2016, replacing Monté Ross, who was fired after the 2015–16 season.

No.	Tenure	Coach	Years	Record	Pct.
1	1905–1906	Samuel Saunders	1	3–4–1	.438
–	1906–1909	No coach	3	15–18	.455
2	1909–1918; 1922–1925	William McAvoy	12	58–83	.411
3	1918–1922	Burton Shipley	4	35–19	.648
4	1925–1927	Frank M. Forstburg	2	6–23	.207
5	1927–1930	Joseph J. Rothrock	3	17–33	.340
6	1930–1937	Gerald Doherty	7	43–64–1	.403
7	1937–1938	Lyal Clark	1	6–10	.375
8	1938–1940	Stephen Grenda	2	13–19	.406
9	1940–1941	Flucie Stewart	1	7–9	.438
10	1941–1943	Emery Adkins	2	14–23	.378
11	1943–1944	Edmund Prince	1	7–9	.438
12	1944–1945	William D. Murray	1	3–9	.250
13	1945–1946	Kenneth Steers	1	7–9	.438
14	1946–1949	Joseph Brunansky	3	24–30	.444
15	1949–1954	Fred Emmerson	5	66–41	.617
16	1954–1966	Irv Wisniewski	12	111–154	.419
17	1966–1971	Dan Peterson	5	69–49	.585
18	1971–1976	Donald Harnum	5	69–57	.548
19	1976–1985	Ronald Rainey	9	91–147	.382
20	1985–1995	Steve Steinwedel	10	163–121	.574
21	1995–2000	Mike Brey	5	99–52	.656
22	2000–2006	David Henderson	6	85–93	.478
23	2006–2016	Monté Ross	10	132–184	.418
24	2016–present	Martin Ingelsby	7	112–103	.521
Totals		24 coaches	118 seasons	1,255–1,363–2	.479
Records updated through end of 2022–23 season Source
