= 1925 Loyola Wolf Pack football team =

American college football season

1925 Loyola Wolf Pack football
- Conference: Southern Intercollegiate Athletic Association
- Record: 2–7 (1–3 SIAA)
- Head coach: Moon Ducote (2nd season)
- Captain: Gene Wallet
- Home stadium: Loyola Stadium

1925 Southern Intercollegiate Athletic Association football standings
	Conf.					Overall
Team	W		L		T	W		L		T
Oglethorpe $	8	–	1	–	0	8	–	3	–	0
SW Louisiana	3	–	0	–	0	7	–	2	–	0
Centenary	2	–	0	–	0	6	–	2	–	0
Millsaps	4	–	1	–	0	5	–	4	–	0
Furman	3	–	1	–	0	7	–	3	–	0
Birmingham–Southern	3	–	1	–	1	7	–	3	–	1
The Citadel	5	–	2	–	0	6	–	4	–	0
Howard (AL)	4	–	2	–	0	6	–	3	–	0
Newberry	3	–	2	–	0	5	–	3	–	0
Mercer	3	–	2	–	0	3	–	6	–	0
Centre	1	–	1	–	0	3	–	6	–	0
Union (TN)	1	–	1	–	0	5	–	4	–	0
Chattanooga	2	–	3	–	0	4	–	4	–	0
Presbyterian	2	–	4	–	0	3	–	6	–	0
Louisiana Tech	1	–	2	–	1	1	–	6	–	1
Wofford	1	–	3	–	0	3	–	7	–	0
Loyola (LA)	1	–	3	–	0	2	–	7	–	0
Mississippi College	1	–	5	–	1	1	–	7	–	1
Louisiana College	0	–	3	–	1	2	–	6	–	1
Georgetown (KY)	0	–	2	–	0	1	–	7	–	0
Rollins	0	–	3	–	0	0	–	7	–	0
Erskine	0	–	4	–	0	1	–	6	–	0
$ – Conference champion

The 1925 Loyola Wolf Pack football team was an American football team that represented Loyola College of New Orleans (now known as Loyola University New Orleans) as a member of the Southern Intercollegiate Athletic Association (SIAA) during the 1925 college football season. In its second season under head coach Moon Ducote, the team compiled a 2–7 record (1–3 against SIAA opponents).

Quarterback J. R. "Deuce" Domengeaux was the star of the team on offense. Gene Wallet was the team captain.

== Schedule ==
Date	Opponent	Site	Result	Attendance	Source
September 26	Southwestern Louisiana	Loyola Stadium; New Orleans, LA	L 0–17		
October 4	Fort Benning*	Loyola Stadium; New Orleans, LA	L 0–45		
October 10	Mississippi College	Loyola Stadium; New Orleans, LA	W 7–6	2,000	
October 18	Dallas*	Loyola Stadium; New Orleans, LA	L 6–58	> 4,000	
October 24	Birmingham–Southern	Loyola Stadium; New Orleans, LA	L 0–38		
October 31	Oglethorpe	Loyola Stadium; New Orleans, LA	L 0–13		
November 8	Spring Hill*	Loyola Stadium; New Orleans, LA	W 30–0		
November 13	LSU*	Loyola Stadium; New Orleans, LA	L 0–13		
November 26	at Tennessee Docs*	Russwood Park; Memphis, TN	L 12–25		
*Non-conference game
