= 1925 Union (Tennessee) Bulldogs football team =

American college football season

1925 Union (Tennessee) Bulldogs football
- Conference: Southern Intercollegiate Athletic Association
- Record: 5–4 (1–1 SIAA)
- Head coach: Joe Guyon (4th season)
- Home stadium: Jackson Athletic Park

1925 Southern Intercollegiate Athletic Association football standings
	Conf.					Overall
Team	W		L		T	W		L		T
Oglethorpe $	8	–	1	–	0	8	–	3	–	0
SW Louisiana	3	–	0	–	0	7	–	2	–	0
Centenary	2	–	0	–	0	6	–	2	–	0
Millsaps	4	–	1	–	0	5	–	4	–	0
Furman	3	–	1	–	0	7	–	3	–	0
Birmingham–Southern	3	–	1	–	1	7	–	3	–	1
The Citadel	5	–	2	–	0	6	–	4	–	0
Howard (AL)	4	–	2	–	0	6	–	3	–	0
Newberry	3	–	2	–	0	5	–	3	–	0
Mercer	3	–	2	–	0	3	–	6	–	0
Centre	1	–	1	–	0	3	–	6	–	0
Union (TN)	1	–	1	–	0	5	–	4	–	0
Chattanooga	2	–	3	–	0	4	–	4	–	0
Presbyterian	2	–	4	–	0	3	–	6	–	0
Louisiana Tech	1	–	2	–	1	1	–	6	–	1
Wofford	1	–	3	–	0	3	–	7	–	0
Loyola (LA)	1	–	3	–	0	2	–	7	–	0
Mississippi College	1	–	5	–	1	1	–	7	–	1
Louisiana College	0	–	3	–	1	2	–	6	–	1
Georgetown (KY)	0	–	2	–	0	1	–	7	–	0
Rollins	0	–	3	–	0	0	–	7	–	0
Erskine	0	–	4	–	0	1	–	6	–	0
$ – Conference champion

The 1925 Union Bulldogs football team was an American football team that represented Union University of Jackson, Tennessee as a member of the Southern Intercollegiate Athletic Association during the 1925 college football season. Led by Joe Guyon in his fourth season as head coach, the Bulldogs compiled an overall record of 5–4.

== Schedule ==
Date	Opponent	Site	Result	Source
September 19	Hall-Moody*	Jackson Athletic Park; Jackson, TN	W 20–0	
September 26	at Alabama*	Denny Field; Tuscaloosa, AL	L 0–53	
October 3	West Tennessee State Teachers*	Jackson Athletic Park; Jackson, TN	W 50–13	
October 10	at Centenary	Centenary Field; Shreveport, LA	L 0–38	
October 17	at Ole Miss*	Hemingway Stadium; Oxford, MS	L 6–7	
October 24	Will Mayfield*	Jackson Athletic Park; Jackson, TN	W 12–0	
October 31	at Milligan*	Elizabethton, TN	L 0–17	
November 14	at Georgetown (KY)	Georgetown, KY	W 19–14	
November 26	Spring Hill*	Jackson Athletic Park; Jackson, TN	W 18–13	
*Non-conference game
