= 1925 Oglethorpe Stormy Petrels football team =

American college football season

1925 Oglethorpe Stormy Petrels football
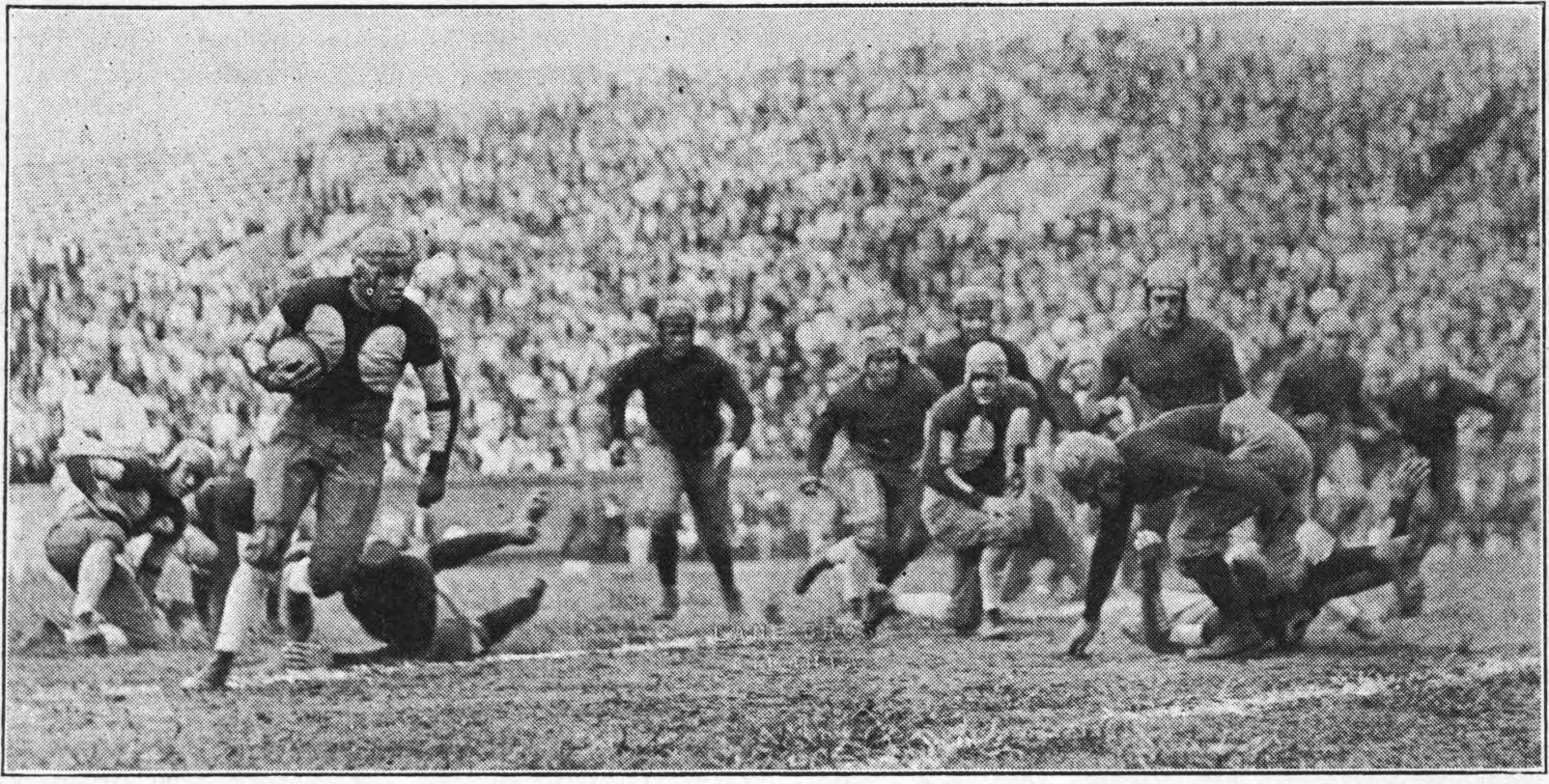

SIAA champion
- Conference: Southern Intercollegiate Athletic Association
- Record: 8–3 (8–1 SIAA)
- Head coach: Harry J. Robertson (2nd season)
- Offensive scheme: Double wing
- Home stadium: Spiller Field

1925 Southern Intercollegiate Athletic Association football standings
| | Conf. | | | | | Overall |
| Team | W | | L | | T | W | | L | | T |
|---|---|---|---|---|---|---|---|---|---|---|
| Oglethorpe $ | 8 | – | 1 | – | 0 | 8 | – | 3 | – | 0 |
| SW Louisiana | 3 | – | 0 | – | 0 | 7 | – | 2 | – | 0 |
| Centenary | 2 | – | 0 | – | 0 | 6 | – | 2 | – | 0 |
| Millsaps | 4 | – | 1 | – | 0 | 5 | – | 4 | – | 0 |
| Furman | 3 | – | 1 | – | 0 | 7 | – | 3 | – | 0 |
| Birmingham–Southern | 3 | – | 1 | – | 1 | 7 | – | 3 | – | 1 |
| The Citadel | 5 | – | 2 | – | 0 | 6 | – | 4 | – | 0 |
| Howard (AL) | 4 | – | 2 | – | 0 | 6 | – | 3 | – | 0 |
| Newberry | 3 | – | 2 | – | 0 | 5 | – | 3 | – | 0 |
| Mercer | 3 | – | 2 | – | 0 | 3 | – | 6 | – | 0 |
| Centre | 1 | – | 1 | – | 0 | 3 | – | 6 | – | 0 |
| Union (TN) | 1 | – | 1 | – | 0 | 5 | – | 4 | – | 0 |
| Chattanooga | 2 | – | 3 | – | 0 | 4 | – | 4 | – | 0 |
| Presbyterian | 2 | – | 4 | – | 0 | 3 | – | 6 | – | 0 |
| Louisiana Tech | 1 | – | 2 | – | 1 | 1 | – | 6 | – | 1 |
| Wofford | 1 | – | 3 | – | 0 | 3 | – | 7 | – | 0 |
| Loyola (LA) | 1 | – | 3 | – | 0 | 2 | – | 7 | – | 0 |
| Mississippi College | 1 | – | 5 | – | 1 | 1 | – | 7 | – | 1 |
| Louisiana College | 0 | – | 3 | – | 1 | 2 | – | 6 | – | 1 |
| Georgetown (KY) | 0 | – | 2 | – | 0 | 1 | – | 7 | – | 0 |
| Rollins | 0 | – | 3 | – | 0 | 0 | – | 7 | – | 0 |
| Erskine | 0 | – | 4 | – | 0 | 1 | – | 6 | – | 0 |
$ – Conference champion

The 1925 Oglethorpe Stormy Petrels football team was an American football team that represented Oglethorpe University in the Southern Intercollegiate Athletic Association (SIAA) during the 1925 college football season. In its second season under head coach Harry J. Robertson, the team compiled an 8–3 record (8–1 against SIAA opponents), won the SIAA championship, and outscored opponents by a total of 119 to 92.

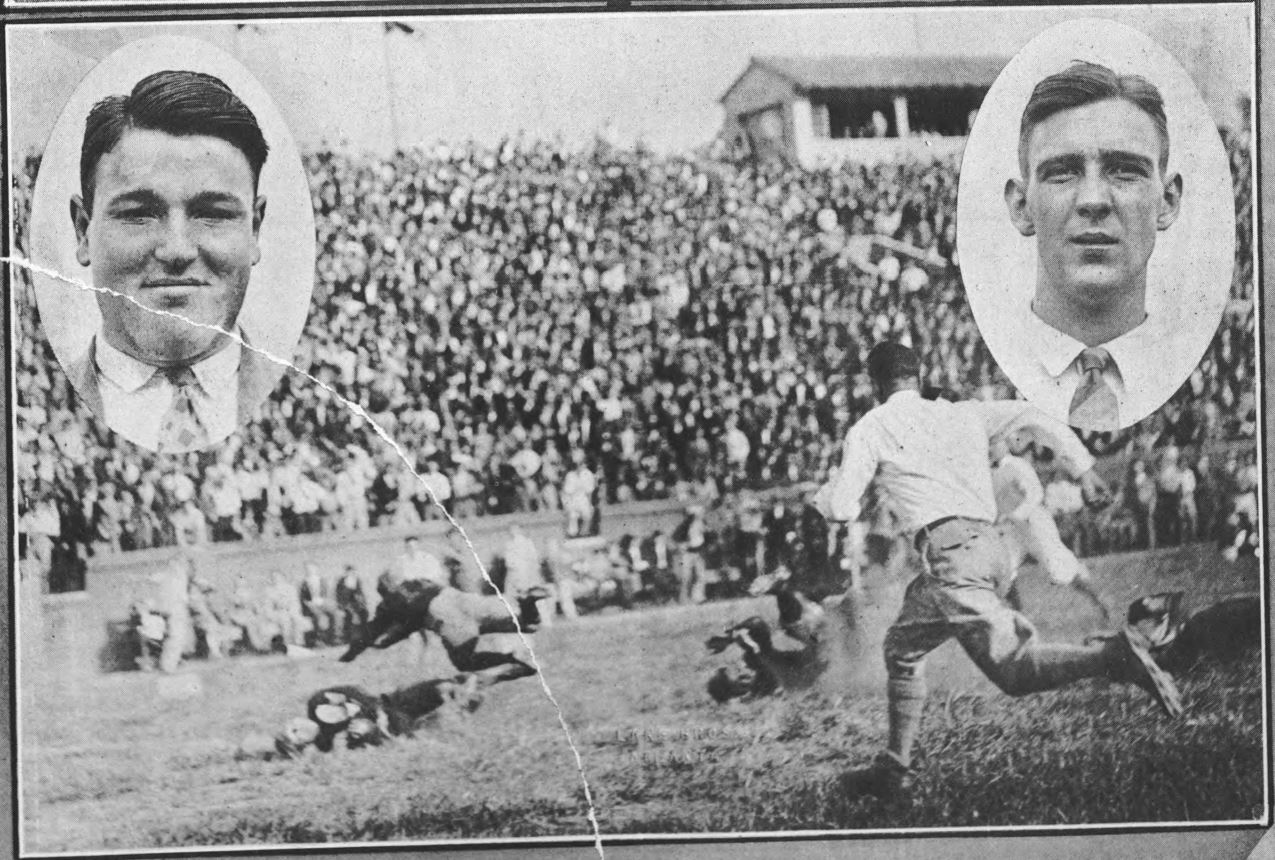
Doug Wycoff scoring a touchdown against Oglethorpe during their game against Georgia Tech

== Schedule ==
| Date | Opponent | Site | Result | Attendance | Source |
|---|---|---|---|---|---|
| September 26 | at Georgia Tech* | Grant Field; Atlanta, GA | L 7–13 | 10,000 | |
| October 3 | at Howard (AL) | Rickwood Field; Birmingham, AL | W 7–6 | 3,000 | |
| October 10 | Centre | Spiller Field; Atlanta, GA | W 20–0 | | |
| October 17 | at Fort Benning* | Doughboy Memorial Stadium; Columbus, GA | L 7–27 | | |
| October 23 | at Wofford | Spartanburg, SC | W 13–7 | | |
| October 31 | at Loyola (LA) | Loyola Stadium; New Orleans, LA | W 13–0 | | |
| November 7 | The Citadel | Spiller Field; Atlanta, GA | W 7–0 | | |
| November 13 | at Presbyterian | Clinton, SC | W 17–16 | | |
| November 21 | Mercer | Spiller Field; Atlanta, GA | L 6–21 | | |
| November 26 | at Chattanooga | Chattanooga, TN | W 6–2 | | |
| December 5 | at Rollins | Coral Gables, FL | W 16–0 | | |
*Non-conference game
