= 1925 Centenary Gentlemen football team =

American college football season

1925 Centenary Gentlemen football
- Conference: Southern Intercollegiate Athletic Association
- Record: 6–2 (2–0 SIAA)
- Head coach: Earl A. Davis (1st season)
- Home stadium: Centenary Field

1925 Southern Intercollegiate Athletic Association football standings
	Conf.					Overall
Team	W		L		T	W		L		T
Oglethorpe $	8	–	1	–	0	8	–	3	–	0
SW Louisiana	3	–	0	–	0	7	–	2	–	0
Centenary	2	–	0	–	0	6	–	2	–	0
Millsaps	4	–	1	–	0	5	–	4	–	0
Furman	3	–	1	–	0	7	–	3	–	0
Birmingham–Southern	3	–	1	–	1	7	–	3	–	1
The Citadel	5	–	2	–	0	6	–	4	–	0
Howard (AL)	4	–	2	–	0	6	–	3	–	0
Newberry	3	–	2	–	0	5	–	3	–	0
Mercer	3	–	2	–	0	3	–	6	–	0
Centre	1	–	1	–	0	3	–	6	–	0
Union (TN)	1	–	1	–	0	5	–	4	–	0
Chattanooga	2	–	3	–	0	4	–	4	–	0
Presbyterian	2	–	4	–	0	3	–	6	–	0
Louisiana Tech	1	–	2	–	1	1	–	6	–	1
Wofford	1	–	3	–	0	3	–	7	–	0
Loyola (LA)	1	–	3	–	0	2	–	7	–	0
Mississippi College	1	–	5	–	1	1	–	7	–	1
Louisiana College	0	–	3	–	1	2	–	6	–	1
Georgetown (KY)	0	–	2	–	0	1	–	7	–	0
Rollins	0	–	3	–	0	0	–	7	–	0
Erskine	0	–	4	–	0	1	–	6	–	0
$ – Conference champion

The 1925 Centenary Gentlemen football team was an American football team that represented the Centenary College of Louisiana as a member of the Southern Intercollegiate Athletic Association (SIAA) during the 1925 college football season. In their only year under head coach Earl A. Davis, the team compiled an 6–2 record.

== Schedule ==
Date	Opponent	Site	Result	Attendance	Source
September 26	Mississippi College	Centenary Field; Shreveport, LA	W 8–0		
October 3	Howard Payne*	Centenary Field; Shreveport, LA	W 20–0		
October 10	Union (TN)*	Centenary Field; Shreveport, LA	W 38–0		
October 17	Rollins	Centenary Field; Shreveport, LA	W 83–0		
October 24	at Tennessee Docs*	Russwood Park; Memphis, TN	W 7–0		
November 7	Central State Teachers*	Fairgrounds Stadium; Shreveport, LA	W 17–7		
November 21	Butler*	Centenary Field; Shreveport, LA	L 0–9	5,000	
November 26	Tulane*	Centenary Field; Shreveport, LA	L 0–14	10,000	
*Non-conference game
