= 1925 Louisiana Tech Bulldogs football team =

American college football season

1925 Louisiana Tech Bulldogs football
- Conference: Southern Intercollegiate Athletic Association
- Record: 1–6–2 (1–2–1 SIAA)
- Head coach: Ralph C. Kenney (1st season)
- Home stadium: Louisiana Tech Field

1925 Southern Intercollegiate Athletic Association football standings
| | Conf. | | | | | Overall |
| Team | W | | L | | T | W | | L | | T |
|---|---|---|---|---|---|---|---|---|---|---|
| Oglethorpe $ | 8 | – | 1 | – | 0 | 8 | – | 3 | – | 0 |
| SW Louisiana | 3 | – | 0 | – | 0 | 7 | – | 2 | – | 0 |
| Centenary | 2 | – | 0 | – | 0 | 6 | – | 2 | – | 0 |
| Millsaps | 4 | – | 1 | – | 0 | 5 | – | 4 | – | 0 |
| Furman | 3 | – | 1 | – | 0 | 7 | – | 3 | – | 0 |
| Birmingham–Southern | 3 | – | 1 | – | 1 | 7 | – | 3 | – | 1 |
| The Citadel | 5 | – | 2 | – | 0 | 6 | – | 4 | – | 0 |
| Howard (AL) | 4 | – | 2 | – | 0 | 6 | – | 3 | – | 0 |
| Newberry | 3 | – | 2 | – | 0 | 5 | – | 3 | – | 0 |
| Mercer | 3 | – | 2 | – | 0 | 3 | – | 6 | – | 0 |
| Centre | 1 | – | 1 | – | 0 | 3 | – | 6 | – | 0 |
| Union (TN) | 1 | – | 1 | – | 0 | 5 | – | 4 | – | 0 |
| Chattanooga | 2 | – | 3 | – | 0 | 4 | – | 4 | – | 0 |
| Presbyterian | 2 | – | 4 | – | 0 | 3 | – | 6 | – | 0 |
| Louisiana Tech | 1 | – | 2 | – | 1 | 1 | – | 6 | – | 1 |
| Wofford | 1 | – | 3 | – | 0 | 3 | – | 7 | – | 0 |
| Loyola (LA) | 1 | – | 3 | – | 0 | 2 | – | 7 | – | 0 |
| Mississippi College | 1 | – | 5 | – | 1 | 1 | – | 7 | – | 1 |
| Louisiana College | 0 | – | 3 | – | 1 | 2 | – | 6 | – | 1 |
| Georgetown (KY) | 0 | – | 2 | – | 0 | 1 | – | 7 | – | 0 |
| Rollins | 0 | – | 3 | – | 0 | 0 | – | 7 | – | 0 |
| Erskine | 0 | – | 4 | – | 0 | 1 | – | 6 | – | 0 |
$ – Conference champion

The 1925 Louisiana Tech Bulldogs football team was an American football team that represented the Louisiana Polytechnic Institute—now known as Louisiana Tech University—as a member of the Southern Intercollegiate Athletic Association (SIAA) during the 1925 college football season. Led by Ralph C. Kenney in his first and only year as head coach, Louisiana Tech compiled an overall record of 1–6–2.

== Schedule ==
| Date | Time | Opponent | Site | Result | Attendance | Source |
|---|---|---|---|---|---|---|
| September 26 | | Henderson-Brown* | Louisiana Tech Field; Ruston, LA | T 0–0 | | |
| October 3 | | at Mississippi College | Clinton, MS | W 6–0 | | |
| October 10 | | Little Rock | Ruston, LA | L 0–10 | | |
| October 17 | | Millsaps^{†} | Ruston, LA | L 2–13 | | |
| October 24 | | at Louisiana College | Pineville, LA | T 0–0 | | |
| October 30 | | vs. Ouachita Baptist* | El Dorado, AR | L 0–28 | | |
| November 7 | | at Tulane* | Tulane Stadium; New Orleans, LA | L 0–37 | | |
| November 20 | 2:30 p.m. | Southwestern Louisiana | Louisiana Tech Field; Ruston, LA (rivalry) | L 13–22 | | |
| November 26 | | at Fort Benning* | Columbus, GA | L 7–66 | 5,000 | |
*Non-conference game; ^{†}Homecoming; All times are in Central time
