= 1925 Southwestern Louisiana Bulldogs football team =

American college football season

1925 Southwestern Louisiana Bulldogs football
- Conference: Southern Intercollegiate Athletic Association
- Record: 7–2 (3–0 SIAA)
- Head coach: T. R. Mobley (7th season)
- Home stadium: Girard Field

1925 Southern Intercollegiate Athletic Association football standings
	Conf.					Overall
Team	W		L		T	W		L		T
Oglethorpe $	8	–	1	–	0	8	–	3	–	0
SW Louisiana	3	–	0	–	0	7	–	2	–	0
Centenary	2	–	0	–	0	6	–	2	–	0
Millsaps	4	–	1	–	0	5	–	4	–	0
Furman	3	–	1	–	0	7	–	3	–	0
Birmingham–Southern	3	–	1	–	1	7	–	3	–	1
The Citadel	5	–	2	–	0	6	–	4	–	0
Howard (AL)	4	–	2	–	0	6	–	3	–	0
Newberry	3	–	2	–	0	5	–	3	–	0
Mercer	3	–	2	–	0	3	–	6	–	0
Centre	1	–	1	–	0	3	–	6	–	0
Union (TN)	1	–	1	–	0	5	–	4	–	0
Chattanooga	2	–	3	–	0	4	–	4	–	0
Presbyterian	2	–	4	–	0	3	–	6	–	0
Louisiana Tech	1	–	2	–	1	1	–	6	–	1
Wofford	1	–	3	–	0	3	–	7	–	0
Loyola (LA)	1	–	3	–	0	2	–	7	–	0
Mississippi College	1	–	5	–	1	1	–	7	–	1
Louisiana College	0	–	3	–	1	2	–	6	–	1
Georgetown (KY)	0	–	2	–	0	1	–	7	–	0
Rollins	0	–	3	–	0	0	–	7	–	0
Erskine	0	–	4	–	0	1	–	6	–	0
$ – Conference champion

The 1925 Southwestern Louisiana Bulldogs football team was an American football team that represented the Southwestern Louisiana Institute of Liberal and Technical Learning (now known as the University of Louisiana at Lafayette) in the Southern Intercollegiate Athletic Association during the 1925 college football season. In their seventh year under head coach T. R. Mobley, the team compiled a 7–2 record.

== Schedule ==
Date	Opponent	Site	Result	Source
September 26	at Loyola (LA)	Loyola University Stadium; New Orleans, LA	W 17–0	
October 3	at LSU*	Tiger Stadium; Baton Rouge, LA	L 6–38	
October 10	South Park Junior College*	Girard Field; Lafayette, LA	W 14–0	
October 17	at Sam Houston State*	Pritchett Field; Huntsville, TX	L 2–7	
October 24	Mississippi State Teachers*	Girard Field; Lafayette, LA	W 46–0	
October 31	Louisiana College	Girard Field; Lafayette, LA	W 31–0	
November 14	Stephen F. Austin*	Girard Field; Lafayette, LA	W 26–7	
November 20	Louisiana Tech	Tech Field; Ruston, LA (rivalry)	W 22–13	
November 26	Louisiana Normal*	Girard Field; Lafayette, LA	W 24–7	
*Non-conference game
