= 1925 Birmingham–Southern Panthers football team =

American college football season

1925 Birmingham–Southern Panthers football
- Conference: Southern Intercollegiate Athletic Association
- Record: 7–3–1 (3–1–1 SIAA)
- Head coach: Harold Drew (2nd season)
- Home stadium: Munger Bowl

1925 Southern Intercollegiate Athletic Association football standings
	Conf.					Overall
Team	W		L		T	W		L		T
Oglethorpe $	8	–	1	–	0	8	–	3	–	0
SW Louisiana	3	–	0	–	0	7	–	2	–	0
Centenary	2	–	0	–	0	6	–	2	–	0
Millsaps	4	–	1	–	0	5	–	4	–	0
Furman	3	–	1	–	0	7	–	3	–	0
Birmingham–Southern	3	–	1	–	1	7	–	3	–	1
The Citadel	5	–	2	–	0	6	–	4	–	0
Howard (AL)	4	–	2	–	0	6	–	3	–	0
Newberry	3	–	2	–	0	5	–	3	–	0
Mercer	3	–	2	–	0	3	–	6	–	0
Centre	1	–	1	–	0	3	–	6	–	0
Union (TN)	1	–	1	–	0	5	–	4	–	0
Chattanooga	2	–	3	–	0	4	–	4	–	0
Presbyterian	2	–	4	–	0	3	–	6	–	0
Louisiana Tech	1	–	2	–	1	1	–	6	–	1
Wofford	1	–	3	–	0	3	–	7	–	0
Loyola (LA)	1	–	3	–	0	2	–	7	–	0
Mississippi College	1	–	5	–	1	1	–	7	–	1
Louisiana College	0	–	3	–	1	2	–	6	–	1
Georgetown (KY)	0	–	2	–	0	1	–	7	–	0
Rollins	0	–	3	–	0	0	–	7	–	0
Erskine	0	–	4	–	0	1	–	6	–	0
$ – Conference champion

The 1925 Birmingham–Southern Panthers football team was an American football team that represented Birmingham–Southern College as a member of the Southern Intercollegiate Athletic Association during the 1925 college football season. In their second season under head coach Harold Drew, the team compiled a 7–3–1 record.

== Schedule ==
Date	Opponent	Site	Result	Source
September 19	Marion*	Munger Bowl; Birmingham, AL	W 46–0	
September 26	Auburn*	Munger Bowl; Birmingham, AL	L 6–25	
October 2	at Alabama*	Denny Field; Tuscaloosa, AL	L 7–50	
October 10	at Southwestern (TN)*	Memphis, TN	W 10–3	
October 16	Mississippi College	Munger Bowl; Birmingham, AL	T 25–25	
October 24	at Loyola (LA)	Loyola Stadium; New Orleans, LA	W 38–0	
October 30	Jacksonville State*	Munger Bowl; Birmingham, AL	W 33–0	
November 6	vs. Chattanooga	Gadsden, AL	W 6–0	
November 13	at Millsaps	Jackson, MS	W 19–6	
November 21	vs. Howard (AL)	Rickwood Field; Birmingham, AL	L 16–20	
November 26	at Southern College	Adair Park; Lakeland, FL	W 9–6	
*Non-conference game
