= 1925 Furman Purple Hurricane football team =

American college football season

1925 Furman Purple Hurricane football
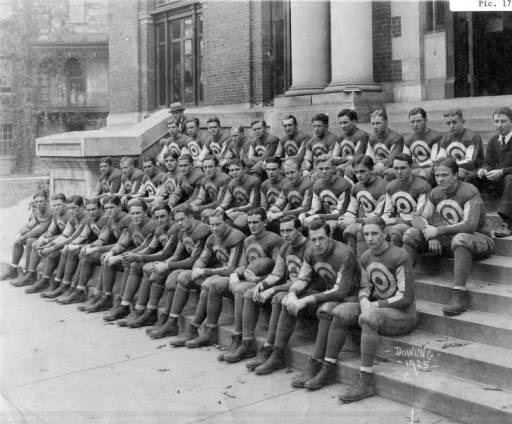

State champion
- Conference: Southern Intercollegiate Athletic Association
- Record: 7–3 (3–1 SIAA)
- Head coach: Billy Laval (11th season)
- Captain: Joe Tilghman
- Home stadium: Manly Field

1925 Southern Intercollegiate Athletic Association football standings
	Conf.					Overall
Team	W		L		T	W		L		T
Oglethorpe $	8	–	1	–	0	8	–	3	–	0
SW Louisiana	3	–	0	–	0	7	–	2	–	0
Centenary	2	–	0	–	0	6	–	2	–	0
Millsaps	4	–	1	–	0	5	–	4	–	0
Furman	3	–	1	–	0	7	–	3	–	0
Birmingham–Southern	3	–	1	–	1	7	–	3	–	1
The Citadel	5	–	2	–	0	6	–	4	–	0
Howard (AL)	4	–	2	–	0	6	–	3	–	0
Newberry	3	–	2	–	0	5	–	3	–	0
Mercer	3	–	2	–	0	3	–	6	–	0
Centre	1	–	1	–	0	3	–	6	–	0
Union (TN)	1	–	1	–	0	5	–	4	–	0
Chattanooga	2	–	3	–	0	4	–	4	–	0
Presbyterian	2	–	4	–	0	3	–	6	–	0
Louisiana Tech	1	–	2	–	1	1	–	6	–	1
Wofford	1	–	3	–	0	3	–	7	–	0
Loyola (LA)	1	–	3	–	0	2	–	7	–	0
Mississippi College	1	–	5	–	1	1	–	7	–	1
Louisiana College	0	–	3	–	1	2	–	6	–	1
Georgetown (KY)	0	–	2	–	0	1	–	7	–	0
Rollins	0	–	3	–	0	0	–	7	–	0
Erskine	0	–	4	–	0	1	–	6	–	0
$ – Conference champion

The 1925 Furman Purple Hurricane football team was an American football team that represented Furman University as a member of the Southern Intercollegiate Athletic Association (SIAA) during the 1925 college football season. In its 11th season under head coach Billy Laval, Furman compiled a 7–3 record (3–1 against SIAA opponents), finished in second place in the SIAA, was recognized as the South Carolina state champion, and outscored opponents by a total of 116 to 75. The team played its home games at Manly Field in Greenville, South Carolina.

== Schedule ==
Date	Opponent	Site	Result	Attendance	Source
September 26	Newberry	Manly Field; Greenville, SC	W 27–10		
October 3	at Washington and Lee*	Wilson Field; Lexington, VA	W 20–15		
October 10	The Citadel	Manly Field; Greenville, SC (rivalry)	W 7–0		
October 17	vs. Georgia*	Academy Field; Augusta, GA	L 0–21	5,000	
October 24	vs. Davidson*	Wearn Field; Charlotte, NC	W 7–0		
October 31	Presbyterian	Manly Field; Greenville, SC	W 27–3		
November 7	at Mercer	Centennial Stadium; Macon, GA	L 0–17		
November 14	South Carolina*	Manly Field; Greenville, SC	W 2–0		
November 20	vs. Wake Forest*	McCormick Field; Asheville, NC	L 0–9	7,000	
November 26	Clemson*	Manly Field; Greenville, SC	W 26–0		
*Non-conference game
