= 1925 Howard Bulldogs football team =

American college football season

1925 Howard Bulldogs football
- Conference: Southern Intercollegiate Athletic Association
- Record: 6–3 (4–2 SIAA)
- Head coach: Jenks Gillem (2nd season)
- Home stadium: Berry Field; Rickwood Field

1925 Southern Intercollegiate Athletic Association football standings
	Conf.					Overall
Team	W		L		T	W		L		T
Oglethorpe $	8	–	1	–	0	8	–	3	–	0
SW Louisiana	3	–	0	–	0	7	–	2	–	0
Centenary	2	–	0	–	0	6	–	2	–	0
Millsaps	4	–	1	–	0	5	–	4	–	0
Furman	3	–	1	–	0	7	–	3	–	0
Birmingham–Southern	3	–	1	–	1	7	–	3	–	1
The Citadel	5	–	2	–	0	6	–	4	–	0
Howard (AL)	4	–	2	–	0	6	–	3	–	0
Newberry	3	–	2	–	0	5	–	3	–	0
Mercer	3	–	2	–	0	3	–	6	–	0
Centre	1	–	1	–	0	3	–	6	–	0
Union (TN)	1	–	1	–	0	5	–	4	–	0
Chattanooga	2	–	3	–	0	4	–	4	–	0
Presbyterian	2	–	4	–	0	3	–	6	–	0
Louisiana Tech	1	–	2	–	1	1	–	6	–	1
Wofford	1	–	3	–	0	3	–	7	–	0
Loyola (LA)	1	–	3	–	0	2	–	7	–	0
Mississippi College	1	–	5	–	1	1	–	7	–	1
Louisiana College	0	–	3	–	1	2	–	6	–	1
Georgetown (KY)	0	–	2	–	0	1	–	7	–	0
Rollins	0	–	3	–	0	0	–	7	–	0
Erskine	0	–	4	–	0	1	–	6	–	0
$ – Conference champion

The 1925 Howard Bulldogs football team was an American football team that represented Howard College (now known as the Samford University) as a member of the Southern Intercollegiate Athletic Association (SIAA) during the 1925 college football season. In their second year under head coach Jenks Gillem, the team compiled a 6–3 record.

== Schedule ==
Date	Opponent	Site	Result	Attendance	Source
September 25	Marion*	Berry Field; Birmingham, AL	W 35–0		
October 3	at Oglethorpe	Rickwood Field; Birmingham, AL	L 6–7	3,000	
October 10	Chattanooga	Rickwood Field; Birmingham, AL	W 3–0		
October 16	at Jacksonville State*	Jacksonville, AL (rivalry)	W 13–0		
October 24	at Auburn*	Drake Field; Auburn, AL	L 6–7		
October 31	at Mississippi College	Provine Field; Clinton, MS	W 10–6		
November 6	Millsaps	Rickwood Field; Birmingham, AL	L 13–14		
November 21	vs. Birmingham–Southern	Rickwood Field; Birmingham, AL	W 20–16	10,000	
November 26	at Rollins	Winter Park Athletic Field; Winter Park, FL	W 7–0		
*Non-conference game
