= Earl A. Davis =

American college football and college basketball coach

Biographical details
- Born: December 28, 1889; Stewart County, Tennessee, U.S.
- Died: February 13, 1965 (aged 75); Maryville, Missouri, U.S.

Playing career

Football
- c. 1910: Transylvania

Coaching career (HC unless noted)

Football
- 1917–1922: Missouri Wesleyan
- 1923–1924: McKendree
- 1925: Centenary
- 1926: Maryville (MO) (assistant)
- 1927–1936: Maryville (MO)

Basketball
- 1923–1925: McKendree

Head coaching record
- Overall: 86–62–12 (football); 22–7 (basketball)

Accomplishments and honors

Championships
- 4 MIAA (1917, 1919, 1921, 1931)

Earl Andrew "Lefty" Davis (December 28, 1889 – February 13, 1965) was an American college football and college basketball coach. He served as the head football coach at Missouri Wesleyan College from 1917 to 1922, McKendree College (now known McKendree University) from 1923 to 1924, Centenary College of Louisiana in 1925, and Northwest Missouri State Teacher's College (common known then as Maryville State Teacher's College and now known as Northwest Missouri State University) from 1927 to 1936. Davis was also the head basketball coach at McKendree from 1923 to 1925, tallying a mark of 22–7.

Davis played football at Transylvania University. He earned a master's degree at Peabody College and pursued graduate studied at the University of Illinois. Davis died on February 13, 1965, in Maryville, Missouri.

== Head coaching record ==
=== Football ===
Year	Team	Overall	Conference	Standing	Bowl/playoffs
Missouri Wesleyan Owls (Missouri Intercollegiate Athletic Association) (1917–1922)
1917	Missouri Wesleyan	7–0–1	5–0–1	T–1st	
1918	Missouri Wesleyan	3–1–1			
1919	Missouri Wesleyan	10–0	8–0	1st	
1920	Missouri Wesleyan	4–2–2	3–1–2	4th	
1921	Missouri Wesleyan	7–1	6–1	T–1st	
1922	Missouri Wesleyan	6–4	4–4	T–5th	
Missouri Wesleyan:		37–8–3			
McKendree Bearcats (Illinois Intercollegiate Athletic Conference) (1923–1924)
1923	McKendree	1–5–1	0–4	T–22nd	
1924	McKendree	4–4 (Note: McKendree finished the season 1924 season 5–2–1 overall and 5–0–1 in conference play, but forfeited a tie with Illinois College and a win over Eastern Illinois.)	4–2	T–5th	
McKendree:		5–9–1	4–6		
Centenary Gentlemen (Southern Intercollegiate Athletic Association) (1925)
1925	Centenary	6–2	2–0	T–2nd	
Centenary:		6–2	2–0		
Maryville Bearcats (Missouri Intercollegiate Athletic Association) (1927–1936)
1927	Maryville	1–7	0–4	5th	
1928	Maryville	5–3–1	1–2–1	T–4th	
1929	Maryville	3–2–3	1–1–1	T–3rd	
1930	Maryville	4–5–1	3–1	2nd	
1931	Maryville	9–0	4–0	1st	
1932	Maryville	4–4–1	2–2	3rd	
1933	Maryville	1–8	1–3	4th	
1934	Maryville	4–5	2–2	3rd	
1935	Maryville	3–5–1	2–3	5th	
1936	Maryville	4–4–1	1–3–1	4th	
Maryville:		38–43–8	17–21–3		
Total:		86–62–12			
National championship Conference title Conference division title or championship game berth
