= 1929 Tennessee State Tigers football team =

American college football season

1929 Tennessee State Tigers football
- Conference: Southern Intercollegiate Athletic Conference
- Record: 4–1–1 (2–1–1 SIAC)
- Head coach: Guy E. Hoffman (1st season)

The 1929 Tennessee State Tigers football team represented Tennessee Agricultural & Industrial State College—now known as Tennessee State University—as a member of the Southern Intercollegiate Athletic Conference (SIAC) during the 1929 college football season. Led by Guy E. Hoffman in his first and only season as head coach, the Tigers compiled an overall record of 4–1–1 with a mark of 2–1–1 conference play.

Hoffman had captained the Tennessee State football team for four years before graduating in 1926.

== Schedule ==
Date	Time	Opponent	Site	Result	Source
October 26		Miles	Nashville, TN	W 25–0 or 27–0	
November 2		Morris Brown	Nashville, TN	W 7–0	
November 8	2:00 p.m.	vs. Morristown*	Lincoln Park; Chattanooga, TN	W 14–0	
November 16		at Lane	Jackson, TN	T 6–6	
November 23		Mississippi Industrial*	Nashville, TN	W 46–0	
November 28		at Fisk	Bennett Field; Nashville, TN	L 0–20	
*Non-conference game; All times are in Central time
