= Guy E. Hoffman =

American football player and coach, educator (1898–1983)

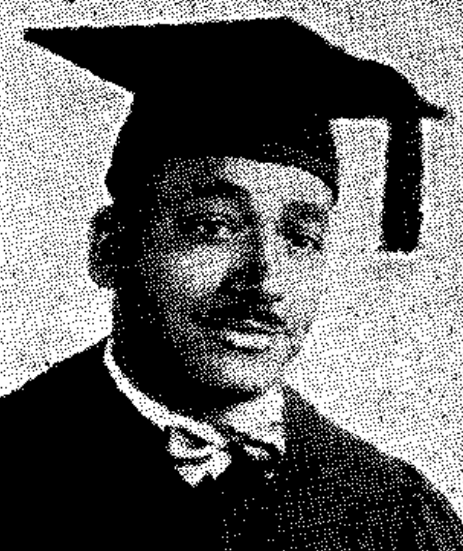
- Hoffman pictured in The Radio 1926, Tennessee State yearbook

Biographical details
- Born: January 27, 1898
- Died: February 8, 1983 (aged 85); Memphis, Tennessee, U.S.

Playing career

Football
- 1922–1925: Tennessee State
- Position: Fullback

Coaching career (HC unless noted)

Football
- c. 1927: Manassas HS (TN)
- 1929: Tennessee State

Basketball
- c. 1927: Manassas HS (TN)

Head coaching record
- Overall: 4–1–1 (college football)

Guy Elliott Hoffman (January 27, 1898 – February 8, 1983) was an American educator and college football player and coach. He was served as the head football coach at Tennessee A&I State Normal School for Negroes—now known as Tennessee State University—in Nashville, Tennessee, for one season, in 1929. Hoffman was the principal of Barret's Chapel High School in Memphis, Tennessee for 42 years.

Hoffman served in the United States Army during World War I, during which he was twice wounded, and received the French medal of honor for bravery in combat. After the war, he attended Tennessee State, from which he earned bachelor's and master's degrees. He starred on the Tennessee State football team, captaining the 1924 and 1925 squads.

In 1926, Hoffman moved to Shelby County, Tennessee, where be began his teaching career, at Woodstock and then at Manassas High School in Memphis. At Manassas, he also coached football and basketball. In 1929, Hoffman returned to Tennessee State to coach the football team. In a game against Morris Brown on November 2, 1929, Hoffman attempted to substitute himself into the game as a player. The game was delayed as Morris Brown's coach, Hilliard D. Canady, argued with the officials about Hoffman's eligibility to play. Hoffman then withdrew his substitution, and the game continued.

Hoffman began his tenure at Barret's Chapel High School in 1929. He was a long-time member of the NAACP and the National Education Association (NEA). He died on February 8, 1983, at Veterans Medical Center in Memphis.

== Head coaching record ==
=== College football ===
Year	Team	Overall	Conference	Standing	Bowl/playoffs
Tennessee State Tigers (Southern Intercollegiate Athletic Conference) (1929)
1929	Tennessee State	4–1–1	2–1–1		
Tennessee State:		4–1–1	2–1–1		
Total:		4–1–1			
