= 1925 Mercer Bears football team =

American college football season

1925 Mercer Bears football
- Conference: Southern Intercollegiate Athletic Association
- Record: 3–6 (3–2 SIAA)
- Head coach: Stanley L. Robinson (3rd season)
- Home stadium: Centennial Stadium

1925 Southern Intercollegiate Athletic Association football standings
	Conf.					Overall
Team	W		L		T	W		L		T
Oglethorpe $	8	–	1	–	0	8	–	3	–	0
SW Louisiana	3	–	0	–	0	7	–	2	–	0
Centenary	2	–	0	–	0	6	–	2	–	0
Millsaps	4	–	1	–	0	5	–	4	–	0
Furman	3	–	1	–	0	7	–	3	–	0
Birmingham–Southern	3	–	1	–	1	7	–	3	–	1
The Citadel	5	–	2	–	0	6	–	4	–	0
Howard (AL)	4	–	2	–	0	6	–	3	–	0
Newberry	3	–	2	–	0	5	–	3	–	0
Mercer	3	–	2	–	0	3	–	6	–	0
Centre	1	–	1	–	0	3	–	6	–	0
Union (TN)	1	–	1	–	0	5	–	4	–	0
Chattanooga	2	–	3	–	0	4	–	4	–	0
Presbyterian	2	–	4	–	0	3	–	6	–	0
Louisiana Tech	1	–	2	–	1	1	–	6	–	1
Wofford	1	–	3	–	0	3	–	7	–	0
Loyola (LA)	1	–	3	–	0	2	–	7	–	0
Mississippi College	1	–	5	–	1	1	–	7	–	1
Louisiana College	0	–	3	–	1	2	–	6	–	1
Georgetown (KY)	0	–	2	–	0	1	–	7	–	0
Rollins	0	–	3	–	0	0	–	7	–	0
Erskine	0	–	4	–	0	1	–	6	–	0
$ – Conference champion

The 1925 Mercer Bears football team was an American football team that represented Mercer University as a member of the Southern Intercollegiate Athletic Association (SIAA) during the 1925 college football season. In their third year under head coach Stanley L. Robinson, the team compiled a 3–6 record.

== Schedule ==
Date	Opponent	Site	Result	Attendance	Source
September 26	Georgia*	Centennial Stadium; Macon, GA	L 0–32		
October 3	at Florida*	Fleming Field; Gainesville, FL	L 0–24	8,000	
October 10	Rollins	Centennial Stadium; Macon, GA	W 14–0		
October 17	at Chattanooga	Chamberlain Field; Chattanooga, TN	L 7–12		
October 24	North Carolina*	Centennial Stadium; Macon, GA	L 0–3		
October 31	vs. The Citadel	Augusta, GA	L 0–31		
November 7	Furman	Centennial Stadium; Macon, GA	W 17–0		
November 21	at Oglethorpe	Spiller Field; Atlanta, GA	W 21–6		
November 26	at Marquette*	Marquette Stadium; Milwaukee, WI	L 0–30	10,000	
*Non-conference game
