= Guy Stephenson (coach) =

American sports coach (1901–1998)

Biographical details
- Born: February 15, 1901; Centerville, Tennessee, U.S.
- Died: January 28, 1998 (aged 96); Goshen, New York, U.S.

Playing career

Football
- 1922: Tennessee
- Position: Center

Coaching career (HC unless noted)

Football
- 1924–1925: Middle Tennessee State Normal/Teachers

Basketball
- 1924–1926: Middle Tennessee State Normal/Teachers

Baseball
- 1925–1926: Middle Tennessee State Normal/Teachers

Head coaching record
- Overall: 4–9–2 (football)

C. Guy Stephenson (February 15, 1901 – January 28, 1998) was an American college football, college basketball and college baseball coach. He served as the head football coach at Middle Tennessee State University in Murfreesboro, Tennessee from 1924 to 1925, as well as serving as the school's head men's basketball coach (1924–1926) and baseball coach (1925–1926).

== Head coaching record ==
=== Football ===
Year	Team	Overall	Conference	Standing	Bowl/playoffs
Middle Tennessee State Normal/Teachers (Independent) (1924–1925)
1924	Middle Tennessee State Normal	1–5			
1925	Middle Tennessee State Teachers	3–4–2			
Middle Tennessee State Normal/Teachers:		4–9–2			
Total:		4–9–2			
