= 1925 Chattanooga Moccasins football team =

American college football season

1925 Chattanooga Moccasins football
- Conference: Southern Intercollegiate Athletic Association
- Record: 4–4 (2–3 SIAA)
- Head coach: Frank Thomas (1st season)
- Captain: Wilbur Hane
- Home stadium: Chamberlain Field

1925 Southern Intercollegiate Athletic Association football standings
	Conf.					Overall
Team	W		L		T	W		L		T
Oglethorpe $	8	–	1	–	0	8	–	3	–	0
SW Louisiana	3	–	0	–	0	7	–	2	–	0
Centenary	2	–	0	–	0	6	–	2	–	0
Millsaps	4	–	1	–	0	5	–	4	–	0
Furman	3	–	1	–	0	7	–	3	–	0
Birmingham–Southern	3	–	1	–	1	7	–	3	–	1
The Citadel	5	–	2	–	0	6	–	4	–	0
Howard (AL)	4	–	2	–	0	6	–	3	–	0
Newberry	3	–	2	–	0	5	–	3	–	0
Mercer	3	–	2	–	0	3	–	6	–	0
Centre	1	–	1	–	0	3	–	6	–	0
Union (TN)	1	–	1	–	0	5	–	4	–	0
Chattanooga	2	–	3	–	0	4	–	4	–	0
Presbyterian	2	–	4	–	0	3	–	6	–	0
Louisiana Tech	1	–	2	–	1	1	–	6	–	1
Wofford	1	–	3	–	0	3	–	7	–	0
Loyola (LA)	1	–	3	–	0	2	–	7	–	0
Mississippi College	1	–	5	–	1	1	–	7	–	1
Louisiana College	0	–	3	–	1	2	–	6	–	1
Georgetown (KY)	0	–	2	–	0	1	–	7	–	0
Rollins	0	–	3	–	0	0	–	7	–	0
Erskine	0	–	4	–	0	1	–	6	–	0
$ – Conference champion

The 1925 Chattanooga Moccasins football team was an American football team that represented the University of Chattanooga (now known as the University of Tennessee at Chattanooga) as a member of the Southern Intercollegiate Athletic Association (SIAA) during the 1925 college football season. In their first year under head coach Frank Thomas, the team compiled a 4–4 record.

== Schedule ==
Date	Opponent	Site	Result	Source
September 26	Jacksonville State*	Chamberlain Field; Chattanooga, TN	W 40–0	
October 3	Cumberland (TN)*	Chamberlain Field; Chattanooga, TN	W 12–7	
October 10	at Howard (AL)	Rickwood Field; Birmingham, AL	L 0–3	
October 17	Mercer	Chamberlain Field; Chattanooga, TN	W 12–7	
October 24	at Georgetown (KY)	Georgetown, KY	W 7–0	
October 31	Sewanee*	Chamberlain Field; Chattanooga, TN	L 0–28	
November 6	vs. Birmingham–Southern	Gadsden, AL	L 0–6	
November 26	Oglethorpe	Chamberlain Field; Chattanooga, TN	L 2–6	
*Non-conference game
