= E. G. Cromartie =

American football coach and agriculture instructor

Biographical details
- Born: June 17, 1892; Appling County, Georgia, U.S.
- Died: February 4, 1963 (aged 70); Bulloch County, Georgia, U.S.

Coaching career (HC unless noted)
- 1924–1926: Georgia Normal

Head coaching record
- Overall: 7–5–1

Esten Graham Cromartie (June 17, 1892 – February 4, 1963) was an American college football coach and agriculture instructor. He served as the first head coach in the history of the football program at Georgia Southern University–then known as Georgia Normal School–from 1924to 1926, compiling a record of 7–5–1. Cromartie was also an instructor in agriculture at the school.

== Head coaching record ==
| Year | Team | Overall | Conference | Standing | Bowl/playoffs |
|---|---|---|---|---|---|
Georgia Normal Blue Tide (Independent) (1924–1926)
| 1924 | Georgia Normal | 1–0 | | | |
| 1925 | Georgia Normal | 1–2 | | | |
| 1926 | Georgia Normal | 5–3–1 | | | |
| Georgia Normal: | | 7–5–1 | | | |
| Total: | | 7–5–1 | | | |
