= William L. Younger =

American sports coach (1894–1977)

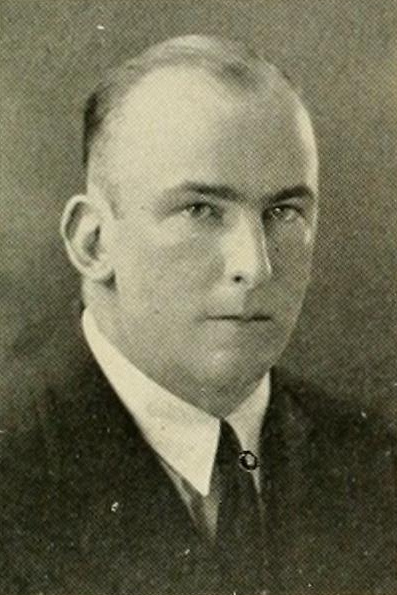
- Younger pictured in Quips and Cranks 1924, Davidson yearbook

Biographical details
- Born: November 16, 1894; Danville, Virginia, U.S.
- Died: June 30, 1977 (aged 82); Blacksburg, Virginia, U.S.

Playing career

Football
- 1915: Davidson
- 1916–1917: Virginia Tech
- Position: End

Coaching career (HC unless noted)

Football
- 1919: Hampden–Sydney
- 1920–1922: Virginia Tech (assistant)
- 1923–1931: Davidson
- 1932: Virginia Tech (assistant)

Basketball
- 1919–1920: Hampden–Sydney
- 1920–1923: Virginia Tech
- 1923–1931: Davidson
- 1932–1937: Virginia Tech

Baseball
- 1921–1923: Virginia Tech
- 1924–1931: Davidson

Administrative career (AD unless noted)
- 1919–1920: Hampden–Sydney
- 1935–1950: Virginia Tech

Head coaching record
- Overall: 49–40–8 (football); 157–159 (basketball); 82–110–4 (baseball)

William Lee "Monk" Younger (November 16, 1894 – June 30, 1977) was an American football player, coach of football, basketball, and baseball, and college athletics administrator. He played college football at Davidson College in 1915 and at Virginia Polytechnic Institute and State University in 1916 and 1917. He was elected captain of the 1918 VPI team, but did not play for the Gobblers because he was serving in France during the close of World War I.

Younger was the head football coach at Hampden–Sydney College in 1919 and at Davidson from 1923 to 1931, compiling a career college football coaching record of 49–40–8. He was also the head basketball coach at Hampden–Sydney (1919–1920), Virginia Tech (1920–1923, 1932–1937), and Davidson (1923–1931), tallying a career college basketball mark of 157–159. In addition, he was the head baseball coach at Virginia Tech from 1921 to 1923 and at Davidson from 1924 to 1931, amassing career college baseball mark of 82–110–4. Younger was appointed as the athletic director of Virginia Tech in 1935 and served in that post until his retirement in 1950. He was elected to the Virginia Tech Sports Hall of Fame in 1984.

He died after a long illness on June 30, 1977, at a hospital in Blacksburg, Virginia.

== Head coaching record ==
=== Football ===
Year	Team	Overall	Conference	Standing	Bowl/playoffs
Hampden–Sydney Tigers () (1919)
1919	Hampden–Sydney	5–2–1			
Hampden–Sydney:		5–2–1			
Davidson Wildcats (Independent) (1923–1931)
1923	Davidson	3–7			
1924	Davidson	7–2–1			
1925	Davidson	6–2–2			
1926	Davidson	7–2–1			
1927	Davidson	4–4–1			
1928	Davidson	2–8			
1929	Davidson	5–5			
1930	Davidson	6–4			
1931	Davidson	4–4–2			
Davidson:		44–38–7			
Total:		49–40–2			
