= 1931 Maryville Bearcats football team =

College football season

1931 Maryville Bearcats football

MIAA champion
- Conference: Missouri Intercollegiate Athletic Association
- Record: 9–0 (4–0 MIAA)
- Head coach: Earl A. Davis (5th season)
- Captains: Cochran; Herman "H" Fischer

1931 Missouri Intercollegiate Athletic Association football standings
	Conf.					Overall
Team	W		L		T	W		L		T
Maryville (MO) $	4	–	0	–	0	9	–	0	–	0
Kirksville	2	–	1	–	1	6	–	1	–	1
Springfield (MO)	2	–	1	–	1	5	–	2	–	1
Warrensburg	1	–	3	–	0	3	–	8	–	0
Cape Girardeau	0	–	4	–	0	2	–	8	–	0
$ – Conference champion

The 1931 Maryville Bearcats football team, also known as the Northwest Missouri State Teachers Bearcats, was an American football team that represented Northwest Missouri State Teachers College (later renamed as Northwest Missouri State University) at Maryville, Missouri, as a member of the Missouri Intercollegiate Athletic Association (MIAA) during the 1931 college football season. In their fifth season under head coach Earl A. Davis, the Bearcats compiled a perfect 9–0 record (4–0 against MIAA opponents), won the MIAA championship, shut out eight of nine opponents, and outscored all opponents by a total of 190 to 6.

The team was led on offense by fullback/halfback H. Fisher, a triple-threat man who was described as a "[p]unter supreme, passer with few equals, pass receiver extraordinary and ball carrier par excellence."

Five Bearcat players were selected as first-team players on the MIAA all-star team selected by the Associated Press with the aid of conference coaches. The five first-team honorees were: Fischer at halfback; Robert Hodge at end; Mack Ruth at center; Robert Dowell at tackle; and Walter Dowell at guard. Quarterback Ryland Milner was named to the second team as was end Wilbur Stalcup, fullback Ted Hodgkinson, and tackle Chris Hedge. Milner later served as the school's head football coach from 1937 to 1957.

== Schedule ==
Date	Opponent	Site	Result	Source
September 25	Peru State*	Maryville, MO	W 12–6	
October 9	Springfield (MO)	Maryville, MO	W 7–0	
October 16	at Cape Girardeau	Cape Girardeau, MO	W 38–0	
October 23	Rolla*	Maryville, MO	W 6–0	
October 30	Missouri "B" team*	Maryville, MO	W 28–0	
November 6	at Tarkio*	Tarkio, MO	W 26–0	
November 11	Kirksville	Maryville, MO	W 7–0	
November 19	at St. Benedict's*	Atchison, KS	W 54–0	
November 26	Warrensburg	Maryville, MO	W 12–0	
*Non-conference game
