= 1925 Mississippi College Choctaws football team =

American college football season

1925 Mississippi College Choctaws football
- Conference: Southern Intercollegiate Athletic Association
- Record: 1–7–1 (1–5–1 SIAA)
- Head coach: George Bohler (3rd season)
- Home stadium: Provine Field

1925 Southern Intercollegiate Athletic Association football standings
	Conf.					Overall
Team	W		L		T	W		L		T
Oglethorpe $	8	–	1	–	0	8	–	3	–	0
SW Louisiana	3	–	0	–	0	7	–	2	–	0
Centenary	2	–	0	–	0	6	–	2	–	0
Millsaps	4	–	1	–	0	5	–	4	–	0
Furman	3	–	1	–	0	7	–	3	–	0
Birmingham–Southern	3	–	1	–	1	7	–	3	–	1
The Citadel	5	–	2	–	0	6	–	4	–	0
Howard (AL)	4	–	2	–	0	6	–	3	–	0
Newberry	3	–	2	–	0	5	–	3	–	0
Mercer	3	–	2	–	0	3	–	6	–	0
Centre	1	–	1	–	0	3	–	6	–	0
Union (TN)	1	–	1	–	0	5	–	4	–	0
Chattanooga	2	–	3	–	0	4	–	4	–	0
Presbyterian	2	–	4	–	0	3	–	6	–	0
Louisiana Tech	1	–	2	–	1	1	–	6	–	1
Wofford	1	–	3	–	0	3	–	7	–	0
Loyola (LA)	1	–	3	–	0	2	–	7	–	0
Mississippi College	1	–	5	–	1	1	–	7	–	1
Louisiana College	0	–	3	–	1	2	–	6	–	1
Georgetown (KY)	0	–	2	–	0	1	–	7	–	0
Rollins	0	–	3	–	0	0	–	7	–	0
Erskine	0	–	4	–	0	1	–	6	–	0
$ – Conference champion

The 1925 Mississippi College Choctaws football team was an American football team that represented Mississippi College as a member of the Southern Intercollegiate Athletic Association (SIAA) during the 1925 college football season. Led by George Bohler in his third season as head coach, the team compiled an overall record of 1–7–1, with a mark of 1–5–1 against SIAA competition.

== Schedule ==
Date	Opponent	Site	Result	Source
September 26	at Centenary	Centenary Field; Shreveport, LA	L 0–8	
October 3	Louisiana Tech	Provine Field; Clinton, MS	L 0–6	
October 10	at Loyola (LA)	Loyola Stadium; New Orleans, LA	L 6–7	
October 16	at Birmingham–Southern	Munger Bowl; Birmingham, AL	T 25–25	
October 23	vs. Millsaps	State Fairgrounds; Jackson, MS (rivalry)	L 0–6	
October 31	Howard (AL)	Provine Field; Clinton, MS	L 6–10	
November 7	at Mississippi A&M*	Scott Field; Starkville, MS	L 0–46	
November 14	Ole Miss*	Provine Field; Clinton, MS	L 7–19	
November 20	at Louisiana College	LC Stadium; Pineville, LA	W 28–0	
*Non-conference game
