= 1925 The Citadel Bulldogs football team =

American college football season

1925 The Citadel Bulldogs football
- Conference: Southern Intercollegiate Athletic Association
- Record: 6–4 (5–2 SIAA)
- Head coach: Carl Prause (4th season)
- Home stadium: College Park Stadium

1925 Southern Intercollegiate Athletic Association football standings
	Conf.					Overall
Team	W		L		T	W		L		T
Oglethorpe $	8	–	1	–	0	8	–	3	–	0
SW Louisiana	3	–	0	–	0	7	–	2	–	0
Centenary	2	–	0	–	0	6	–	2	–	0
Millsaps	4	–	1	–	0	5	–	4	–	0
Furman	3	–	1	–	0	7	–	3	–	0
Birmingham–Southern	3	–	1	–	1	7	–	3	–	1
The Citadel	5	–	2	–	0	6	–	4	–	0
Howard (AL)	4	–	2	–	0	6	–	3	–	0
Newberry	3	–	2	–	0	5	–	3	–	0
Mercer	3	–	2	–	0	3	–	6	–	0
Centre	1	–	1	–	0	3	–	6	–	0
Union (TN)	1	–	1	–	0	5	–	4	–	0
Chattanooga	2	–	3	–	0	4	–	4	–	0
Presbyterian	2	–	4	–	0	3	–	6	–	0
Louisiana Tech	1	–	2	–	1	1	–	6	–	1
Wofford	1	–	3	–	0	3	–	7	–	0
Loyola (LA)	1	–	3	–	0	2	–	7	–	0
Mississippi College	1	–	5	–	1	1	–	7	–	1
Louisiana College	0	–	3	–	1	2	–	6	–	1
Georgetown (KY)	0	–	2	–	0	1	–	7	–	0
Rollins	0	–	3	–	0	0	–	7	–	0
Erskine	0	–	4	–	0	1	–	6	–	0
$ – Conference champion

The 1925 The Citadel Bulldogs football team represented The Citadel, The Military College of South Carolina in the 1925 college football season. Carl Prause served as head coach for the fourth season. The Bulldogs played as members of the Southern Intercollegiate Athletic Association and played home games at College Park Stadium in Hampton Park.

== Schedule ==
Date	Opponent	Site	Result	Source
September 26	Parris Island Marines*	College Park Stadium; Charleston, SC	W 7–0	
October 3	Rollins	College Park Stadium; Charleston, SC	W 27–0	
October 10	at Furman	Manly Field; Greenville, SC (rivalry)	L 0–7	
October 17	Newberry	College Park Stadium; Charleston, SC	W 26–0	
October 28	vs. South Carolina*	County Fairgrounds; Orangeburg, SC	L 6–30	
October 31	vs. Mercer	Augusta, GA	W 31–0	
November 7	at Oglethorpe	Spiller Field; Atlanta, GA	L 0–7	
November 14	Clemson*	College Park Stadium; Charleston, SC	L 0–6	
November 21	Erskine	College Park Stadium; Charleston, SC	W 53–0	
November 26	Presbyterian	College Park Stadium; Charleston, SC	W 7–0	
*Non-conference game
