= Hank Garrity (coach) =

American sports player and coach (1900–1972)

- Garrity pictured in The Savitar 1923, Missouri yearbook

Biographical details
- Born: January 30, 1900; Quincy, Massachusetts, U.S.
- Died: August 30, 1972 (aged 72); Boston, Massachusetts, U.S.

Playing career

Football
- 1919–1921: Princeton

Baseball
- c. 1922: Princeton

Coaching career (HC unless noted)

Football
- 1922: Missouri (assistant)
- 1923–1925: Wake Forest

Basketball
- 1923–1925: Wake Forest

Baseball
- 1923: Missouri
- 1924–1925: Wake Forest

Administrative career (AD unless noted)
- 1923–1926: Wake Forest

Head coaching record
- Overall: 19–7–1 (football); 33–14 (basketball)

Accomplishments and honors

Awards
- Second-team All-American (1920)

Martin Henry Garrity Jr. (January 30, 1900 – August 30, 1972) was an American football and baseball player, coach of football, basketball, and baseball, and college athletics administrator. He served as the head football coach at Wake Forest University from 1923 to 1925, compiling a record of 19–7–1. Garrity was also the head basketball coach at Wake Forest from 1923 to 1925, tallying a mark of 33–14. He served as the head baseball coach at the University of Missouri in 1923 and at Wake Forest from 1924 to 1925.

Garrity was an alumnus of Princeton University, from which he graduated in 1922. At Princeton he played football and baseball. Garrity came to Missouri in 1922 as an assistant football coach. There he served under head coach Thomas Kelley.

Garrity was born on January 30, 1900, in Quincy, Massachusetts. He died on August 30, 1972, in Boston, where he had resided in his later years.

== Head coaching record ==
=== Football ===
Year	Team	Overall	Conference	Standing	Bowl/playoffs
Wake Forest Baptists / Demon Deacons (Independent) (1923–1925)
1923	Wake Forest	6–3			
1924	Wake Forest	7–2			
1925	Wake Forest	6–2–1			
Wake Forest:		19–7–1			
Total:		19–7–1			
