= 1925 Duke Blue Devils football team =

American college football season

1925 Duke Blue Devils football
- Conference: Independent
- Record: 4–5
- Head coach: James P. Herron (1st season)
- Captain: Fred Grigg

1925 Southern college football independents records
	Conf.			Overall
Team	W	L	T	W		L		T
Louisville		–		8	–	0	–	0
Georgetown		–		9	–	1	–	0
Howard		–		6	–	0	–	2
Tennessee State		–		4	–	1	–	0
Texas Mines		–		5	–	1	–	1
Texas Tech		–		6	–	1	–	2
Stetson		–		6	–	2	–	1
Wake Forest		–		6	–	2	–	1
Davidson		–		6	–	2	–	2
George Washington		–		6	–	2	–	2
Navy		–		5	–	2	–	1
Texas A&I		–		4	–	2	–	1
William & Mary		–		6	–	4	–	0
Catholic University		–		4	–	4	–	0
Delaware		–		4	–	4	–	0
Spring Hill		–		4	–	4	–	0
Tennessee Docs		–		5	–	5	–	0
Duke		–		4	–	5	–	0
Middle Tennessee State Teachers		–		3	–	4	–	2
East Tennessee State Teachers		–		3	–	4	–	0
Western Kentucky State Normal		–		3	–	5	–	1
Georgia Normal		–		1	–	2	–	0
Richmond		–		3	–	6	–	0
Loyola (MD)		–		2	–	6	–	0
Delaware State		–		0	–	2	–	0
Mississippi State Teachers		–		0	–	6	–	0
West Tennessee State Teachers		–		0	–	7	–	1

The 1925 Duke Blue Devils football team was an American football team that represented Duke University as an independent during the 1925 college football season. In its first season under head coach James P. Herron, the team compiled a 4–5 record and was outscored by a total of 142 to 58. Fred Grigg was the team captain.

The university's benefactor, James Buchanan Duke, died on October 10, 1925, the same day as a 41-0 loss to North Carolina.

== Schedule ==
Date	Opponent	Site	Result	Source
September 26	Guilford	Hanes Field; Durham, NC	W 33–0	
October 3	NC State	Hanes Field; Durham, NC (rivalry)	L 0–13	
October 10	North Carolina	Hanes Field; Durham, NC (rivalry)	L 0–41	
October 17	at Elon	Comer Field; Elon, NC	W 6–0	
October 24	vs. William & Mary	League Park; Norfolk, VA	L 0–41	
October 31	Richmond	Hanes Field; Durham, NC	W 10–0	
November 7	Wake Forest^{†}	Hanes Field; Durham, NC (rivalry)	L 3–21	
November 20	at Wofford	Spartanburg, SC	W 6–0	
November 26	at Davidson	Richardson Field; Davidson, NC	L 0–26	
^{†}Homecoming
