= 1925 Loyola Green and Gray football team =

American college football season

1925 Loyola Green and Gray football
- Conference: Independent
- Record: 2–6
- Head coach: Stan Cofall (1st season)
- Home stadium: Baltimore Stadium

1925 Southern college football independents records
	Conf.			Overall
Team	W	L	T	W		L		T
Louisville		–		8	–	0	–	0
Georgetown		–		9	–	1	–	0
Howard		–		6	–	0	–	2
Tennessee State		–		4	–	1	–	0
Texas Mines		–		5	–	1	–	1
Texas Tech		–		6	–	1	–	2
Stetson		–		6	–	2	–	1
Wake Forest		–		6	–	2	–	1
Davidson		–		6	–	2	–	2
George Washington		–		6	–	2	–	2
Navy		–		5	–	2	–	1
Texas A&I		–		4	–	2	–	1
William & Mary		–		6	–	4	–	0
Catholic University		–		4	–	4	–	0
Delaware		–		4	–	4	–	0
Spring Hill		–		4	–	4	–	0
Tennessee Docs		–		5	–	5	–	0
Duke		–		4	–	5	–	0
Middle Tennessee State Teachers		–		3	–	4	–	2
East Tennessee State Teachers		–		3	–	4	–	0
Western Kentucky State Normal		–		3	–	5	–	1
Georgia Normal		–		1	–	2	–	0
Richmond		–		3	–	6	–	0
Loyola (MD)		–		2	–	6	–	0
Delaware State		–		0	–	2	–	0
Mississippi State Teachers		–		0	–	6	–	0
West Tennessee State Teachers		–		0	–	7	–	1

The 1925 Loyola Green and Gray Maryland football team was an American football team that represented Loyola College Maryland as an independent during the 1925 college football season. In its first season under head coach Stan Cofall, the team compiled a 2–6 record.

== Schedule ==
Date	Opponent	Site	Result	Source
September 26	Villanova	Baltimore Stadium; Baltimore, MD	L 0–33	
October 3	at Camp Meade Tank School	Camp Meade, MD	W 20–7	
October 10	at Saint Joseph's	Cahill Field; Philadelphia, PA	L 0–13	
October 17	at Washington College	Chestertown, MD	L 6–14	
October 24	Western Maryland	Baltimore Stadium; Baltimore, MD	L 0–19	
October 31	Catholic University		Cancelled	
November 7	at Schuylkill	Schuylkill Stadium; Reading, PA	L 12–14	
November 14	Gallaudet	Evergreen, Baltimore	W 21–14	
November 21	Mount St. Mary's	Homewood Field; Baltimore, MD	L 0–20	
