= Frank M. Forstburg =

American sports coach (1894–1970)

Biographical details
- Born: June 5, 1894; Lancaster, Pennsylvania, U.S.
- Died: October 13, 1970 (aged 76); Wilmington, Delaware, U.S.
- Education: Franklin & Marshall

Coaching career (HC unless noted)

Football
- 1925–1926: Delaware

Basketball
- 1925–1927: Delaware

Football
- 1926: Delaware

Administrative career (AD unless noted)
- 1925–1927: Delaware

Head coaching record
- Overall: 7–9 (football); 6–23 (basketball); 2–10 (baseball)

Frank M. Forstburg (June 5, 1894 – October 13, 1970) was an American football, basketball, and baseball coach. He served as the head football coach at the University of Delaware from 1925 to 1926, compiling a record of 7–9. Forstburg was also the head basketball coach at Delaware from 1925 to 1927, amassing a record of 6–23, and the school's head baseball coach in 1926, tallying a mark of 2–10. Forstburg was born in Lancaster, Pennsylvania. He died on October 13, 1970, in Wilmington, Delaware.

== Head coaching record ==
=== Football ===
| Year | Team | Overall | Conference | Standing | Bowl/playoffs |
|---|---|---|---|---|---|
Delaware Fightin' Blue Hens (Independent) (1925–1926)
| 1925 | Delaware | 4–4 | | | |
| 1926 | Delaware | 3–5 | | | |
| Delaware: | | 7–9 | | | |
| Total: | | 7–9 | | | |
