= 1925 West Tennessee State Teachers football team =

American college football season

1925 West Tennessee State Teachers football
- Conference: Independent
- Record: 0–7–1
- Head coach: Zach Curlin (2nd season)
- Captain: Gene Packard
- Home stadium: Memorial Field

1925 Southern college football independents records
| | Conf. | | | Overall |
| Team | W | L | T | W | | L | | T |
|---|---|---|---|---|---|---|---|---|
| Louisville | | – | | 8 | – | 0 | – | 0 |
| Georgetown | | – | | 9 | – | 1 | – | 0 |
| Howard | | – | | 6 | – | 0 | – | 2 |
| Texas Mines | | – | | 5 | – | 1 | – | 1 |
| Texas Tech | | – | | 6 | – | 1 | – | 2 |
| Stetson | | – | | 6 | – | 2 | – | 1 |
| Wake Forest | | – | | 6 | – | 2 | – | 1 |
| Davidson | | – | | 6 | – | 2 | – | 2 |
| George Washington | | – | | 6 | – | 2 | – | 2 |
| Navy | | – | | 5 | – | 2 | – | 1 |
| Texas A&I | | – | | 4 | – | 2 | – | 1 |
| William & Mary | | – | | 6 | – | 4 | – | 0 |
| Catholic University | | – | | 4 | – | 4 | – | 0 |
| Delaware | | – | | 4 | – | 4 | – | 0 |
| Spring Hill | | – | | 4 | – | 4 | – | 0 |
| Tennessee Docs | | – | | 5 | – | 5 | – | 0 |
| Duke | | – | | 4 | – | 5 | – | 0 |
| Middle Tennessee State Teachers | | – | | 3 | – | 4 | – | 2 |
| East Tennessee State Teachers | | – | | 3 | – | 4 | – | 0 |
| Western Kentucky State Normal | | – | | 3 | – | 5 | – | 1 |
| Georgia Normal | | – | | 1 | – | 2 | – | 0 |
| Richmond | | – | | 3 | – | 6 | – | 0 |
| Loyola (MD) | | – | | 2 | – | 6 | – | 0 |
| Delaware State | | – | | 0 | – | 2 | – | 0 |
| Mississippi State Teachers | | – | | 0 | – | 6 | – | 0 |
| West Tennessee State Teachers | | – | | 0 | – | 7 | – | 1 |

The 1925 West Tennessee State Teachers football team was an American football team that represented West Tennessee State Teachers College (now known as the University of Memphis) as an independent during the 1925 college football season. In their second season under head coach Zach Curlin, West Tennessee State Teachers compiled a 0–7–1 record.

== Schedule ==
| Date | Time | Opponent | Site | Result | Source |
|---|---|---|---|---|---|
| September 25 | | at Jonesboro College | Jonesboro, AR | T 6–6 | |
| October 3 | | at Union (TN) | Jackson Athletic Park; Jackson, TN | L 13–50 | |
| October 9 | | at Jonesboro A&M | Kays Field; Jonesboro, AR (rivalry) | L 0–19 | |
| October 23 | 2:45 p.m. | Hall-Moody | Memorial Field; Memphis, TN | L 6–15 | |
| October 29 | | at Hendrix | Conway, AR | L 6–54 | |
| November 6 | | at Bethel (TN) | McKenzie, TN | L 0–7 | |
| November 13 | | at Middle Tennessee State Teachers | Murfreesboro, TN | L 7–57 | |
| November 26 | 2:30 p.m. | at Southwestern (TN) | Fargason Field; Memphis, TN | L 6–31 | |
All times are in Central time
