= 1925 East Tennessee State Teachers football team =

American college football season

1925 East Tennessee State Teachers football
- Conference: Independent
- Record: 3–4
- Head coach: John Robinson (1st season)
- Home stadium: Teacher's Athletic Field

1925 Southern college football independents records
	Conf.			Overall
Team	W	L	T	W		L		T
Louisville		–		8	–	0	–	0
Georgetown		–		9	–	1	–	0
Howard		–		6	–	0	–	2
Texas Mines		–		5	–	1	–	1
Texas Tech		–		6	–	1	–	2
Stetson		–		6	–	2	–	1
Wake Forest		–		6	–	2	–	1
Davidson		–		6	–	2	–	2
George Washington		–		6	–	2	–	2
Navy		–		5	–	2	–	1
Texas A&I		–		4	–	2	–	1
William & Mary		–		6	–	4	–	0
Catholic University		–		4	–	4	–	0
Delaware		–		4	–	4	–	0
Spring Hill		–		4	–	4	–	0
Tennessee Docs		–		5	–	5	–	0
Duke		–		4	–	5	–	0
Middle Tennessee State Teachers		–		3	–	4	–	2
East Tennessee State Teachers		–		3	–	4	–	0
Western Kentucky State Normal		–		3	–	5	–	1
Georgia Normal		–		1	–	2	–	0
Richmond		–		3	–	6	–	0
Loyola (MD)		–		2	–	6	–	0
Delaware State		–		0	–	2	–	0
Mississippi State Teachers		–		0	–	6	–	0
West Tennessee State Teachers		–		0	–	7	–	1

The 1925 East Tennessee State Teachers football team was an American football team that represented East Tennessee State Teacher's College—now known as East Tennessee State University (ETSU)—as an independent in the 1925 college football season. It was the first year the school was known as East Tennessee State Teacher's College. They were led by first-year coach John Robinson, a World War I veteran and a University of Tennessee graduate, who also taught agriculture and coached the other male sports squads. He was referred to affectionately as "Robbie" and was so popular that later the 1929 yearbook was dedicated to him. The 1925 season was the first that the team was officially referred to as the "Teachers". It was recognized as one of the most successful in the fledgling program's history as they went 3–4 entirely against college-level competition, and 19 of 38 the male students came out for the team.

== Schedule ==
Date	Time	Opponent	Site	Result	Source
October 2		at Bluefield	Bluefield, WV	L 0–14	
October 9	3:00 p.m.	Hiwassee	Johnson City, TN	L 0–7	
October 24	3:00 p.m.	Mars Hill	Teacher's Athletic Field; Johnson City, TN	W 20–6	
October 30		at Lincoln Memorial	Cumberland Gap, TN	L 0–19	
November 13		Athens	Johnson City, TN	W 19–0	
November 21		at Lenoir–Rhyne	Hickory Field; Hickory, NC	L 0–45	
November 28		Tusculum	Johnson City, TN	W 14–13	
All times are in Eastern time
