= 1925 Delaware Fightin' Blue Hens football team =

American college football season

1925 Delaware Fightin' Blue Hens football
- Conference: Independent
- Record: 4–4
- Head coach: Frank M. Forstburg (1st season)
- Captain: Lewis "Huck" Kramer
- Home stadium: Frazer Field

1925 Southern college football independents records
	Conf.			Overall
Team	W	L	T	W		L		T
Louisville		–		8	–	0	–	0
Georgetown		–		9	–	1	–	0
Howard		–		6	–	0	–	2
Texas Mines		–		5	–	1	–	1
Texas Tech		–		6	–	1	–	2
Stetson		–		6	–	2	–	1
Wake Forest		–		6	–	2	–	1
Davidson		–		6	–	2	–	2
George Washington		–		6	–	2	–	2
Navy		–		5	–	2	–	1
Texas A&I		–		4	–	2	–	1
William & Mary		–		6	–	4	–	0
Catholic University		–		4	–	4	–	0
Delaware		–		4	–	4	–	0
Spring Hill		–		4	–	4	–	0
Tennessee Docs		–		5	–	5	–	0
Duke		–		4	–	5	–	0
Middle Tennessee State Teachers		–		3	–	4	–	2
East Tennessee State Teachers		–		3	–	4	–	0
Western Kentucky State Normal		–		3	–	5	–	1
Georgia Normal		–		1	–	2	–	0
Richmond		–		3	–	6	–	0
Loyola (MD)		–		2	–	6	–	0
Delaware State		–		0	–	2	–	0
Mississippi State Teachers		–		0	–	6	–	0
West Tennessee State Teachers		–		0	–	7	–	1

The 1925 Delaware Fightin' Blue Hens football team was an American football team that represented the University of Delaware as an independent during the 1925 college football season. in their first season under head coach Frank M. Forstburg, the Blue Hens compiled a 4–4 record and were outscored by a total of 71 to 63. The team played its home games at Frazer Field in Newark, Delaware.

== Schedule ==
Date	Opponent	Site	Result	Attendance	Source
October 3	Saint Joseph's	Frazer Field; Newark, DE	W 14–6		
October 9	Ursinus	Frazer Field; Newark, PA	W 6–2		
October 17	Swarthmore	Frazer Field; Newark, DE	L 0–2		
October 24	St. John's (MD)	Frazer Field; Newark, DE	L 6–7		
October 31	Upsala	Frazer Field; Newark, DE	W 24–7		
November 7	Juniata	Frazier Field; Newark, DE	W 13–6		
November 14	Haverford	Frazier Field; Newark, DE	L 0–18		
November 26	at Dickinson	Biddle Field; Carlisle, PA	L 0–23		
