= 1925 Georgetown Blue and Gray football team =

American college football season

1925 Georgetown Blue and Gray football
- Conference: Independent
- Record: 9–1
- Head coach: Lou Little (2nd season)
- Captain: Jack Hagerty
- Home stadium: Griffith Stadium

1925 Southern college football independents records
	Conf.			Overall
Team	W	L	T	W		L		T
Louisville		–		8	–	0	–	0
Georgetown		–		9	–	1	–	0
Howard		–		6	–	0	–	2
Texas Mines		–		5	–	1	–	1
Texas Tech		–		6	–	1	–	2
Stetson		–		6	–	2	–	1
Wake Forest		–		6	–	2	–	1
Davidson		–		6	–	2	–	2
George Washington		–		6	–	2	–	2
Navy		–		5	–	2	–	1
Texas A&I		–		4	–	2	–	1
William & Mary		–		6	–	4	–	0
Catholic University		–		4	–	4	–	0
Delaware		–		4	–	4	–	0
Spring Hill		–		4	–	4	–	0
Tennessee Docs		–		5	–	5	–	0
Duke		–		4	–	5	–	0
Middle Tennessee State Teachers		–		3	–	4	–	2
East Tennessee State Teachers		–		3	–	4	–	0
Western Kentucky State Normal		–		3	–	5	–	1
Georgia Normal		–		1	–	2	–	0
Richmond		–		3	–	6	–	0
Loyola (MD)		–		2	–	6	–	0
Delaware State		–		0	–	2	–	0
Mississippi State Teachers		–		0	–	6	–	0
West Tennessee State Teachers		–		0	–	7	–	1

The 1925 Georgetown Blue and Gray football team was an American football team that represented Georgetown University as an independent during the 1925 college football season. In its second team under head coach Lou Little, the team compiled a 9–1 record, shut out seven of ten opponents, and outscored all opponents by a total of 281 to 19.

Fullback Tony Plansky was selected by the All-America Board and Collier's Weekly as a third-team player on the 1925 All-America team. Plansky was also a collegiate decathlon champion. Yale coach Tad Jones, who chose Plansky for the first team, said: "Plansky possesses everything that a fullback or a football player needs. Unusually fast, a fine kicker and passer, Plansky hits into the line with complete abandon and rounds out his game with defensive strength of the highest order." He also received honors on the 1925 All-Eastern football team.

The team played its home games at Griffith Stadium in Washington, D. C.

== Schedule ==
Date	Opponent	Site	Result	Attendance	Source
September 26	Drexel	Griffith Stadium; Washington, DC	W 25–0		
October 3	Mount St. Mary's	Griffith Stadium; Washington, DC	W 19–13		
October 10	Lebanon Valley	Griffith Stadium; Washington, DC	W 50–0		
October 17	at Detroit	University of Detroit Stadium; Detroit, MI	W 24–0		
October 24	Bucknell	Griffith Stadium; Washington, DC	L 2–3		
October 31	King	Griffith Stadium; Washington, DC	W 37–0		
November 7	Lehigh	Griffith Stadium; Washington, DC	W 40–0		
November 14	Centre	Griffith Stadium; Washington, DC	W 41–3		
November 21	at Fordham	Polo Grounds; New York, NY	W 27–0	30,000	
November 26	Quantico Marines	Griffith Stadium; Washington, DC	W 16–0		
