= 1925 Tennessee Docs football team =

American college football season

1925 Tennessee Docs football
- Conference: Independent
- Record: 5–5
- Head coach: Bill Brennan (4th season)
- Home stadium: Russwood Park

1925 Southern college football independents records
	Conf.			Overall
Team	W	L	T	W		L		T
Louisville		–		8	–	0	–	0
Georgetown		–		9	–	1	–	0
Howard		–		6	–	0	–	2
Texas Mines		–		5	–	1	–	1
Texas Tech		–		6	–	1	–	2
Stetson		–		6	–	2	–	1
Wake Forest		–		6	–	2	–	1
Davidson		–		6	–	2	–	2
George Washington		–		6	–	2	–	2
Navy		–		5	–	2	–	1
Texas A&I		–		4	–	2	–	1
William & Mary		–		6	–	4	–	0
Catholic University		–		4	–	4	–	0
Delaware		–		4	–	4	–	0
Spring Hill		–		4	–	4	–	0
Tennessee Docs		–		5	–	5	–	0
Duke		–		4	–	5	–	0
Middle Tennessee State Teachers		–		3	–	4	–	2
East Tennessee State Teachers		–		3	–	4	–	0
Western Kentucky State Normal		–		3	–	5	–	1
Georgia Normal		–		1	–	2	–	0
Richmond		–		3	–	6	–	0
Loyola (MD)		–		2	–	6	–	0
Delaware State		–		0	–	2	–	0
Mississippi State Teachers		–		0	–	6	–	0
West Tennessee State Teachers		–		0	–	7	–	1

The 1925 Tennessee Docs football team (variously "Docs", "UT Doctors" or the "Tennessee Medicos") represented the University of Tennessee College of Medicine in Memphis in the 1925 college football season.

== Schedule ==
Date	Opponent	Site	Result	Attendance	Source
September 26	Bethel (TN)	Russwood Park; Memphis, TN	W 24–0		
October 3	King	Russwood Park; Memphis, TN	W 19–14	1,200	
October 10	at Tulsa	McNulty Park; Tulsa, OK	L 7–27		
October 17	Cumberland (TN)	Russwood Park; Memphis, TN	L 0–17		
October 24	Centenary	Russwood Park; Memphis, TN	L 0–7		
October 31	St. Edward's	Russwood Park; Memphis, TN	L 0–14		
November 7	Fort Benning	Russwood Park; Memphis, TN	W 7–0		
November 14	Quantico Marines	Russwood Park; Memphis, TN	L 0–14		
November 21	at Dallas	Fair Park Stadium; Dallas, TX	W 9–7		
November 26	Loyola (LA)	Russwood Park; Memphis, TN	W 25–12		
