= 1925 Richmond Spiders football team =

American college football season

1925 Richmond Spiders football
- Conference: Independent
- Record: 3–6
- Head coach: Frank Dobson (12th season)
- Captain: David M. Miller
- Home stadium: Mayo Island Park

1925 Southern college football independents records
	Conf.			Overall
Team	W	L	T	W		L		T
Louisville		–		8	–	0	–	0
Georgetown		–		9	–	1	–	0
Howard		–		6	–	0	–	2
Texas Mines		–		5	–	1	–	1
Texas Tech		–		6	–	1	–	2
Stetson		–		6	–	2	–	1
Wake Forest		–		6	–	2	–	1
Davidson		–		6	–	2	–	2
George Washington		–		6	–	2	–	2
Navy		–		5	–	2	–	1
Texas A&I		–		4	–	2	–	1
William & Mary		–		6	–	4	–	0
Catholic University		–		4	–	4	–	0
Delaware		–		4	–	4	–	0
Spring Hill		–		4	–	4	–	0
Tennessee Docs		–		5	–	5	–	0
Duke		–		4	–	5	–	0
Middle Tennessee State Teachers		–		3	–	4	–	2
East Tennessee State Teachers		–		3	–	4	–	0
Western Kentucky State Normal		–		3	–	5	–	1
Georgia Normal		–		1	–	2	–	0
Richmond		–		3	–	6	–	0
Loyola (MD)		–		2	–	6	–	0
Delaware State		–		0	–	2	–	0
Mississippi State Teachers		–		0	–	6	–	0
West Tennessee State Teachers		–		0	–	7	–	1

The 1925 Richmond Spiders football team was an American football team that represented the University of Richmond as an independent during the 1925 college football season. Led by 12th-year head coach, Frank Dobson, the Spiders compiled a record of 3–6. Richmond played their home games at Mayo Island Park on Mayo Island.

== Schedule ==
Date	Time	Opponent	Site	Result	Source
September 25		at NC State	Riddick Stadium; Raleigh, NC	L 0–20	
October 3	3:30 p.m.	Lynchburg	Mayo Island Park; Richmond, VA	W 7–5	
October 10		at Virginia	Lambeth Field; Charlottesville, VA	L 0–19	
October 17		at Johns Hopkins	Homewood Field; Baltimore, MD	L 0–7	
October 23	3:00 p.m.	Randolph–Macon	Mayo Island Park; Richmond, VA	W 22–0	
October 31		at Duke	Hanes Field; Durham, NC	L 0–10	
November 7		at Roanoke	Maher Field; Roanoke, VA	L 0–6	
November 14	2:00 p.m.	Hampden–Sydney	Mayo Island Park; Richmond, VA	W 12–0	
November 26		William & Mary	Mayo Island Park; Richmond, VA (rivalry)	L 0–14	
All times are in Eastern time
