= Windy Nicklaus =

American football player and coach (1904–1991)

Biographical details
- Born: January 6, 1904
- Died: January 8, 1991 (aged 87)

Playing career

Football
- 1924: Bucknell
- 1925–1927: Texas Tech

Baseball
- 1926–1928: Texas Tech
- Position: Halfback (football)

Coaching career (HC unless noted)

Football
- 1935: Amarillo JC
- 1936–1938: Altus JC
- 1939–1940: Oklahoma Baptist
- 1946: West Texas A&M

Head coaching record
- Overall: 18–5–1 (college); 34–5 (junior college)

Accomplishments and honors

Championships
- 1 OCC (1940)

William Winfield "Windy" Nicklaus (January 6, 1904 – January 8, 1991) was an American football player and coach. He served as the head football coach at Oklahoma Baptist University from 1939 to 1940 and at West Texas A&M University in 1946.

Nickaus attended Amarillo High School in Amarillo, Texas, where he was captain of the football team in 1922. Nicklaus began his college football career at Bucknell University in 1924, playing for head coach Charley Moran, and transferred to Texas Tech University, where he was captain of the 1925 Texas Tech Matadors, the school's first football team. Nickaus graduated from Texas Tech in 1928 and later coached football at Amarillo Junior High School. In 1935, he was appointed head football coach at Amarillo Junior College—now known as Amarillo College—succeeding Frank Kimbrough. A year later, Nickaus moved on to Altus Junior College—now known as Western Oklahoma State College—in Altus, Oklahoma, serving as head football coach there for three seasons. He led his junior college football teams at the two schools to a record of 34–5 in four seasons.

Nicklaus was later an educator and civic leader in Amarillo. He died on January 8, 1991.

== Head coaching record ==
=== College ===
Year	Team	Overall	Conference	Standing	Bowl/playoffs
Oklahoma Baptist Bison (Oklahoma Collegiate Conference) (1939–1940)
1939	Oklahoma Baptist	8–2	4–2	T–2nd	
1940	Oklahoma Baptist	8–2–1	5–0–1	1st	
Oklahoma Baptist:		16–4–1	9–2–1		
West Texas State Buffaloes (Border Conference) (1946)
1946	West Texas State	2–1 (Note: Gus Miller served as West Texas State's head coach for the first seven games of the 1946 season before resigning. Nicklaus replaced Miller as head coach and led West Texas State to a record of 2–1 over the final three games of the season. The team finished 5–5 overall and 4–5 in Border Conference play.)	1–1	5th	
West Texas State:		2–1	1–1		
Total:		18–5–1			
National championship Conference title Conference division title or championship game berth
