= 1925 Howard Bison football team =

American college football season

1925 Howard Bison football

Black college national champion
- Conference: Independent
- Record: 6–0–2
- Head coach: Louis L. Watson (1st season)
- Home stadium: American League Park

1925 Southern college football independents records
	Conf.			Overall
Team	W	L	T	W		L		T
Louisville		–		8	–	0	–	0
Georgetown		–		9	–	1	–	0
Howard		–		6	–	0	–	2
Texas Mines		–		5	–	1	–	1
Texas Tech		–		6	–	1	–	2
Stetson		–		6	–	2	–	1
Wake Forest		–		6	–	2	–	1
Davidson		–		6	–	2	–	2
George Washington		–		6	–	2	–	2
Navy		–		5	–	2	–	1
Texas A&I		–		4	–	2	–	1
William & Mary		–		6	–	4	–	0
Catholic University		–		4	–	4	–	0
Delaware		–		4	–	4	–	0
Spring Hill		–		4	–	4	–	0
Tennessee Docs		–		5	–	5	–	0
Duke		–		4	–	5	–	0
Middle Tennessee State Teachers		–		3	–	4	–	2
East Tennessee State Teachers		–		3	–	4	–	0
Western Kentucky State Normal		–		3	–	5	–	1
Georgia Normal		–		1	–	2	–	0
Richmond		–		3	–	6	–	0
Loyola (MD)		–		2	–	6	–	0
Delaware State		–		0	–	2	–	0
Mississippi State Teachers		–		0	–	6	–	0
West Tennessee State Teachers		–		0	–	7	–	1

The 1925 Howard Bison football team was an American football team that represented Howard University during the 1925 college football season. In their second year under head coach Louis L. Watson, the Bison compiled a 6–0–2 record, did not allow a point to be scored by opponents, outscored opponents by a total of 140 to 0, and were recognized as the black college national champion.

== Schedule ==
Date	Opponent	Site	Result	Attendance	Source
October 3	Morgan	Washington, DC	W 27–0		
October 10	Livingstone	Washington, DC	W 21–0		
October 17	Johnson C. Smith	Washington, DC	W 9–0		
October 24	West Virginia Collegiate	Washington, DC	T 0–0		
October 31	North Carolina Central	Campus grounds; Washington, DC	W 70–0		
November 6	Wilberforce	American League Park; Washington, DC	W 6–0		
November 13	Atlanta	American League Park; Washington, DC	W 7–0	5,000	
November 26	vs. Lincoln (PA)	Shibe Park; Philadelphia, PA (The Football Classic)	T 0–0	25,000	
