= 1925 Davidson Wildcats football team =

American college football season

1925 Davidson Wildcats football
- Conference: Independent
- Record: 6–2–2
- Head coach: William L. Younger (3rd season)
- Home stadium: Richardson Field

1925 Southern college football independents records
	Conf.			Overall
Team	W	L	T	W		L		T
Louisville		–		8	–	0	–	0
Georgetown		–		9	–	1	–	0
Howard		–		6	–	0	–	2
Texas Mines		–		5	–	1	–	1
Texas Tech		–		6	–	1	–	2
Stetson		–		6	–	2	–	1
Wake Forest		–		6	–	2	–	1
Davidson		–		6	–	2	–	2
George Washington		–		6	–	2	–	2
Navy		–		5	–	2	–	1
Texas A&I		–		4	–	2	–	1
William & Mary		–		6	–	4	–	0
Catholic University		–		4	–	4	–	0
Delaware		–		4	–	4	–	0
Spring Hill		–		4	–	4	–	0
Tennessee Docs		–		5	–	5	–	0
Duke		–		4	–	5	–	0
Middle Tennessee State Teachers		–		3	–	4	–	2
East Tennessee State Teachers		–		3	–	4	–	0
Western Kentucky State Normal		–		3	–	5	–	1
Georgia Normal		–		1	–	2	–	0
Richmond		–		3	–	6	–	0
Loyola (MD)		–		2	–	6	–	0
Delaware State		–		0	–	2	–	0
Mississippi State Teachers		–		0	–	6	–	0
West Tennessee State Teachers		–		0	–	7	–	1

The 1925 Davidson Wildcats football team was an American football team that represented Davidson College as an independent during the 1925 college football season. In their third year under head coach William L. Younger, the team compiled a 6–2–2 record.

== Schedule ==
Date	Opponent	Site	Result	Source
September 19	Elon	Richardson Field; Davidson, NC	W 34–0	
September 26	Wofford	Richardson Field; Davidson, NC	W 7–0	
October 3	vs. Wake Forest	Wearn Field; Charlotte, NC	T 7–7	
October 10	Guilford	Richardson Field; Davidson, NC	W 26–0	
October 17	vs. Presbyterian	Winthrop Stadium; Rock Hill, SC	W 12–0	
October 24	vs. Furman	Wearn Field; Charlotte, NC	L 0–7	
October 31	NC State^{†}	Richardson Field; Davidson, NC	W 9–0	
November 7	vs. Hampden–Sydney	Wearn Field; Charlotte, NC	T 6–6	
November 14	at North Carolina	Emerson Field; Chapel Hill, NC	L 0–13	
November 26	Duke	Richardson Field; Davidson, NC	W 26–0	
^{†}Homecoming
