= 1925 Middle Tennessee State Teachers football team =

American college football season

1925 Middle Tennessee State Teachers football
- Conference: Independent
- Record: 3–4–2
- Head coach: Guy Stephenson (2nd season)
- Captain: Keathly Presgrove

1925 Southern college football independents records
| | Conf. | | | Overall |
| Team | W | L | T | W | | L | | T |
|---|---|---|---|---|---|---|---|---|
| Louisville | | – | | 8 | – | 0 | – | 0 |
| Georgetown | | – | | 9 | – | 1 | – | 0 |
| Howard | | – | | 6 | – | 0 | – | 2 |
| Texas Mines | | – | | 5 | – | 1 | – | 1 |
| Texas Tech | | – | | 6 | – | 1 | – | 2 |
| Stetson | | – | | 6 | – | 2 | – | 1 |
| Wake Forest | | – | | 6 | – | 2 | – | 1 |
| Davidson | | – | | 6 | – | 2 | – | 2 |
| George Washington | | – | | 6 | – | 2 | – | 2 |
| Navy | | – | | 5 | – | 2 | – | 1 |
| Texas A&I | | – | | 4 | – | 2 | – | 1 |
| William & Mary | | – | | 6 | – | 4 | – | 0 |
| Catholic University | | – | | 4 | – | 4 | – | 0 |
| Delaware | | – | | 4 | – | 4 | – | 0 |
| Spring Hill | | – | | 4 | – | 4 | – | 0 |
| Tennessee Docs | | – | | 5 | – | 5 | – | 0 |
| Duke | | – | | 4 | – | 5 | – | 0 |
| Middle Tennessee State Teachers | | – | | 3 | – | 4 | – | 2 |
| East Tennessee State Teachers | | – | | 3 | – | 4 | – | 0 |
| Western Kentucky State Normal | | – | | 3 | – | 5 | – | 1 |
| Georgia Normal | | – | | 1 | – | 2 | – | 0 |
| Richmond | | – | | 3 | – | 6 | – | 0 |
| Loyola (MD) | | – | | 2 | – | 6 | – | 0 |
| Delaware State | | – | | 0 | – | 2 | – | 0 |
| Mississippi State Teachers | | – | | 0 | – | 6 | – | 0 |
| West Tennessee State Teachers | | – | | 0 | – | 7 | – | 1 |

The 1925 Middle Tennessee Teachers football team represented Middle Tennessee State Teachers College—now known as Middle Tennessee State University—during the 1925 college football season. Led by Guy Stephenson in his second and final season as head coach, Middle Tennessee Teachers compiled a record of 3–4–2. The team's captain was Keathly Presgrove.

== Schedule ==
| Date | Opponent | Site | Result | Source |
|---|---|---|---|---|
| September 26 | Vanderbilt | Dudley Field; Nashville, TN | L 0–27 | |
| October 3 | at Sewanee | McGee Field; Sewanee, TN | L 0–53 | |
| October 10 | Bryson | Murfreesboro, TN | W 13–6 | |
| October 17 | Western Kentucky State Normal | Murfreesboro, (rivalry) | T 7–7 | |
| October 24 | at Tennessee Tech | Cookeville, TN | T 0–0 | |
| October 31 | Bethel (TN) | Murfreesboro, TN | W 30–12 | |
| November 5 | at Murray State | Cutchin Stadium; Murray, KY | L 0–6 | |
| November 13 | West Tennessee State Teachers | Murfreesboro, TN | W 57–7 | |
| November 26 | Stetson | Cummings Field; Deland, FL | L 0–10 | |
