= 1925 George Washington Hatchetites football team =

American college football season

1925 George Washington Hatchetites football
- Conference: Independent
- Record: 6–2–2
- Head coach: Harry W. Crum (2nd season)
- Home stadium: Griffith Stadium

1925 Southern college football independents records
	Conf.			Overall
Team	W	L	T	W		L		T
Louisville		–		8	–	0	–	0
Georgetown		–		9	–	1	–	0
Howard		–		6	–	0	–	2
Texas Mines		–		5	–	1	–	1
Texas Tech		–		6	–	1	–	2
Stetson		–		6	–	2	–	1
Wake Forest		–		6	–	2	–	1
Davidson		–		6	–	2	–	2
George Washington		–		6	–	2	–	2
Navy		–		5	–	2	–	1
Texas A&I		–		4	–	2	–	1
William & Mary		–		6	–	4	–	0
Catholic University		–		4	–	4	–	0
Delaware		–		4	–	4	–	0
Spring Hill		–		4	–	4	–	0
Tennessee Docs		–		5	–	5	–	0
Duke		–		4	–	5	–	0
Middle Tennessee State Teachers		–		3	–	4	–	2
East Tennessee State Teachers		–		3	–	4	–	0
Western Kentucky State Normal		–		3	–	5	–	1
Georgia Normal		–		1	–	2	–	0
Richmond		–		3	–	6	–	0
Loyola (MD)		–		2	–	6	–	0
Delaware State		–		0	–	2	–	0
Mississippi State Teachers		–		0	–	6	–	0
West Tennessee State Teachers		–		0	–	7	–	1

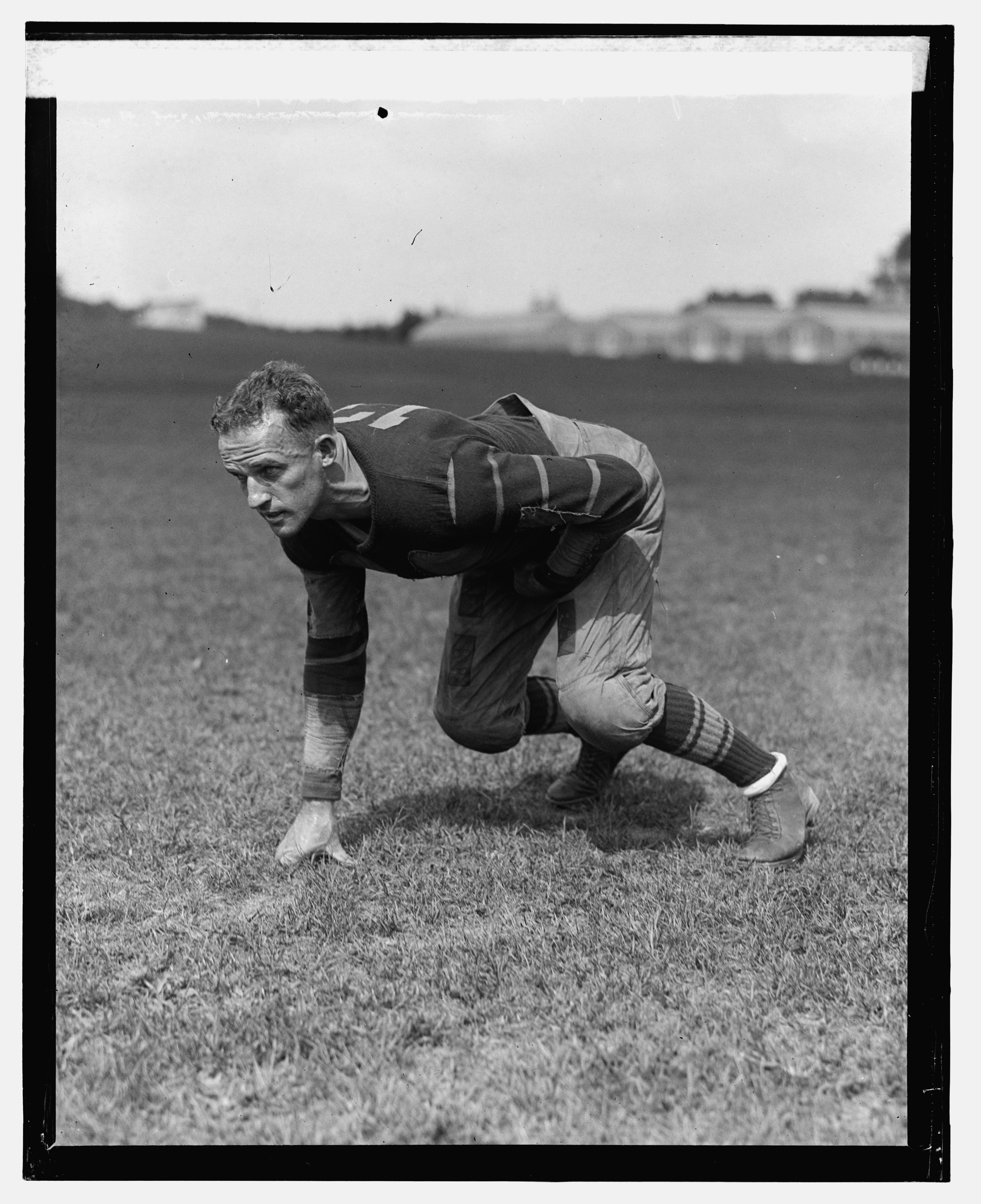
Hottel, Capt., Geo. Wash., 1925

The 1925 George Washington Hatchetites football team was an American football team that represented George Washington University as an independent during the 1925 college football season. In their second season under head coach Harry W. Crum, the team compiled a 6–2–2 record.

== Schedule ==
Date	Opponent	Site	Result	Source
September 26	Blue Ridge College	Central High School Stadium; Washington, DC	W 45–0	
October 3	Juniata	Central High School Stadium; Washington, DC	W 32–0	
October 10	at Bucknell	Memorial Stadium; Lewisburg, PA	L 0–20	
October 17	Mount St. Mary's	Central High School Stadium; Washington, DC	W 7–3	
October 24	at Ursinus	Patterson Field; Collegeville, PA	T 0–0	
October 31	Washington College	Central High School Stadium; Washington, DC	W 27–0	
November 7	Temple	Central High School Stadium; Washington, DC	T 0–0	
November 13	at Randolph–Macon	Ashland, VA	W 54–7	
November 21	Buffalo	Wilson Memorial Stadium; Washington, DC	W 59–0	
November 26	at Catholic University	Brookland Stadium; Washington, DC	L 0–20	
