= 1925 Mississippi State Teachers Yellow Jackets football team =

American college football season

1925 Mississippi State Teachers Yellow Jackets football
- Conference: Independent
- Record: 0–6
- Head coach: William Herschel Bobo (2nd season)
- Home stadium: Kamper Park

1925 Southern college football independents records
	Conf.			Overall
Team	W	L	T	W		L		T
Louisville		–		8	–	0	–	0
Georgetown		–		9	–	1	–	0
Howard		–		6	–	0	–	2
Texas Mines		–		5	–	1	–	1
Texas Tech		–		6	–	1	–	2
Stetson		–		6	–	2	–	1
Wake Forest		–		6	–	2	–	1
Davidson		–		6	–	2	–	2
George Washington		–		6	–	2	–	2
Navy		–		5	–	2	–	1
Texas A&I		–		4	–	2	–	1
William & Mary		–		6	–	4	–	0
Catholic University		–		4	–	4	–	0
Delaware		–		4	–	4	–	0
Spring Hill		–		4	–	4	–	0
Tennessee Docs		–		5	–	5	–	0
Duke		–		4	–	5	–	0
Middle Tennessee State Teachers		–		3	–	4	–	2
East Tennessee State Teachers		–		3	–	4	–	0
Western Kentucky State Normal		–		3	–	5	–	1
Georgia Normal		–		1	–	2	–	0
Richmond		–		3	–	6	–	0
Loyola (MD)		–		2	–	6	–	0
Delaware State		–		0	–	2	–	0
Mississippi State Teachers		–		0	–	6	–	0
West Tennessee State Teachers		–		0	–	7	–	1

The 1925 Mississippi State Teachers Yellow Jackets football team was an American football team that represented the Mississippi State Teachers College (now known as the University of Southern Mississippi) as an independent during the 1925 college football season. In their second year under head coach William Herschel Bobo, the team compiled an 0–6 record.

== Schedule ==
Date	Opponent	Site	Result	Source
October 1	Clarke College (MS)	Kamper Park; Hattiesburg, MS	L 0–32	
October 10	Ole Miss freshmen	Kamper Park; Hattiesburg, MS	L 6–38	
October 17	at NAS Pensacola	Pensacola, FL	L 6–32	
October 24	at Southwestern Louisiana	Girard Field; Lafayette, LA	L 0–46	
November 7	at Pearl River	Poplarville, MS	L 7–13	
November 14	at Spring Hill	Hartwell Field; Mobile, AL	L 0–40	
