= 1925 Wake Forest Demon Deacons football team =

American college football season

1925 Wake Forest Demon Deacons football
- Conference: Independent
- Record: 6–2–1
- Head coach: Hank Garrity (3rd season)
- Captain: Murray Greason
- Home stadium: Gore Field

1925 Southern college football independents records
	Conf.			Overall
Team	W	L	T	W		L		T
Louisville		–		8	–	0	–	0
Georgetown		–		9	–	1	–	0
Howard		–		6	–	0	–	2
Texas Mines		–		5	–	1	–	1
Texas Tech		–		6	–	1	–	2
Stetson		–		6	–	2	–	1
Wake Forest		–		6	–	2	–	1
Davidson		–		6	–	2	–	2
George Washington		–		6	–	2	–	2
Navy		–		5	–	2	–	1
Texas A&I		–		4	–	2	–	1
William & Mary		–		6	–	4	–	0
Catholic University		–		4	–	4	–	0
Delaware		–		4	–	4	–	0
Spring Hill		–		4	–	4	–	0
Tennessee Docs		–		5	–	5	–	0
Duke		–		4	–	5	–	0
Middle Tennessee State Teachers		–		3	–	4	–	2
East Tennessee State Teachers		–		3	–	4	–	0
Western Kentucky State Normal		–		3	–	5	–	1
Georgia Normal		–		1	–	2	–	0
Richmond		–		3	–	6	–	0
Loyola (MD)		–		2	–	6	–	0
Delaware State		–		0	–	2	–	0
Mississippi State Teachers		–		0	–	6	–	0
West Tennessee State Teachers		–		0	–	7	–	1

The 1925 Wake Forest Demon Deacons football team was an American football team that represented Wake Forest University as an independent during the 1925 college football season. In its third season under head coach Hank Garrity, the team compiled a 6–2–1 record and outscored opponents by a total of 185 to 40.

== Schedule ==
Date	Opponent	Site	Result	Attendance	Source
September 26	at North Carolina	Emerson Field; Chapel Hill, NC (rivalry)	W 6–0		
October 3	vs. Davidson	Wearn Field; Charlotte, NC	T 7–7	6,000	
October 10	Lenoir–Rhyne	Gore Field; Wake Forest, NC	W 49–0		
October 24	at Florida	Fleming Field; Gainesville, FL	L 3–24	8,000	
October 30	Guilford	Gore Field; Wake Forest, NC	W 25–0		
November 7	at Duke	Hanes Field; Durham, NC (rivalry)	W 21–3		
November 14	at NC State	Riddick Stadium; Raleigh, NC (rivalry)	L 0–6		
November 20	vs. Furman	McCormick Field; Asheville, NC	W 9–0	7,000	
November 26	at Elon	Elon, NC	W 65–0		
