= 1925 Spring Hill Badgers football team =

American college football season

1925 Spring Hill Badgers football
- Conference: Independent
- Record: 4–4
- Head coach: William T. Daly (1st season)

1925 Southern college football independents records
	Conf.			Overall
Team	W	L	T	W		L		T
Louisville		–		8	–	0	–	0
Georgetown		–		9	–	1	–	0
Howard		–		6	–	0	–	2
Texas Mines		–		5	–	1	–	1
Texas Tech		–		6	–	1	–	2
Stetson		–		6	–	2	–	1
Wake Forest		–		6	–	2	–	1
Davidson		–		6	–	2	–	2
George Washington		–		6	–	2	–	2
Navy		–		5	–	2	–	1
Texas A&I		–		4	–	2	–	1
William & Mary		–		6	–	4	–	0
Catholic University		–		4	–	4	–	0
Delaware		–		4	–	4	–	0
Spring Hill		–		4	–	4	–	0
Tennessee Docs		–		5	–	5	–	0
Duke		–		4	–	5	–	0
Middle Tennessee State Teachers		–		3	–	4	–	2
East Tennessee State Teachers		–		3	–	4	–	0
Western Kentucky State Normal		–		3	–	5	–	1
Georgia Normal		–		1	–	2	–	0
Richmond		–		3	–	6	–	0
Loyola (MD)		–		2	–	6	–	0
Delaware State		–		0	–	2	–	0
Mississippi State Teachers		–		0	–	6	–	0
West Tennessee State Teachers		–		0	–	7	–	1

The 1925 Spring Hill Badgers football team was an American football team that represented Spring Hill College, a Jesuit college in Mobile, Alabama, during the 1925 college football season. In its first season under head coach William T. Daly, the team compiled a 4–4 record.

== Schedule ==
Date	Opponent	Site	Result	Source
October 3	Jacksonville State	Monroe Park; Mobile, AL	W 7–0	
October 9	Clarke (MS)	Monroe Park; Mobile, AL	W 13–0	
October 17	Marion	Monroe Park; Mobile, AL	W 24–0	
October 23	at Little Rock	Little Rock, AR	L 7–14	
October 31	Stetson	Monroe Park; Mobile, AL	L 5–6	
November 8	at Loyola (LA)	Loyola Stadium; New Orleans, LA	L 0–30	
November 14	Mississippi State Teachers	Hartwell Field; Mobile, AL	W 40–0	
November 26	at Union (TN)	Jackson Athletic Park; Jackson, TN	L 13–18	
