= 1925 Western Kentucky State Normal football team =

American college football season

1925 Western Kentucky State Normal football
- Conference: Independent
- Record: 3–5–1
- Head coach: Edgar Diddle (4th season)
- Captain: Harry "Pap" Glenn

1925 Southern college football independents records
	Conf.			Overall
Team	W	L	T	W		L		T
Louisville		–		8	–	0	–	0
Georgetown		–		9	–	1	–	0
Howard		–		6	–	0	–	2
Texas Mines		–		5	–	1	–	1
Texas Tech		–		6	–	1	–	2
Stetson		–		6	–	2	–	1
Wake Forest		–		6	–	2	–	1
Davidson		–		6	–	2	–	2
George Washington		–		6	–	2	–	2
Navy		–		5	–	2	–	1
Texas A&I		–		4	–	2	–	1
William & Mary		–		6	–	4	–	0
Catholic University		–		4	–	4	–	0
Delaware		–		4	–	4	–	0
Spring Hill		–		4	–	4	–	0
Tennessee Docs		–		5	–	5	–	0
Duke		–		4	–	5	–	0
Middle Tennessee State Teachers		–		3	–	4	–	2
East Tennessee State Teachers		–		3	–	4	–	0
Western Kentucky State Normal		–		3	–	5	–	1
Georgia Normal		–		1	–	2	–	0
Richmond		–		3	–	6	–	0
Loyola (MD)		–		2	–	6	–	0
Delaware State		–		0	–	2	–	0
Mississippi State Teachers		–		0	–	6	–	0
West Tennessee State Teachers		–		0	–	7	–	1

The 1925 Western Kentucky State Normal football team representedWestern Kentucky State Normal School and Teachers College (now known as Western Kentucky University) as an independent during the 1925 college football season. They were coached by Edgar Diddle in his fourth year.

== Schedule ==
Date	Time	Opponent	Site	Result	Source
September 26	2:30 p.m.	at Western State Normal	Normal field; Kalamazoo, MI	L 0–20	
October 3		Bethel (TN)	Bowling Green, KY	W 24–6	
October 10		Louisville	Fairgrounds; Bowling Green, KY	L 0–6	
October 17		Middle Tennessee State Teachers	Bowling Green, KY (rivalry)	T 7–7	
October 24		Centre	Bowling Green, KY	L 0–13	
November 14		Transylvania	Bowling Green, KY	W 7–0	
November 21		Evansville	Bowling Green, KY	W 14–6	
November 26		Ozarks	Bowling Green, KY	L 0–20	
November 30		Kentucky Wesleyan	Bowling Green, KY	L 0–13	
All times are in Central time
