= 1925 Texas Mines Miners football team =

American college football season

1925 Texas Mines Miners football
- Conference: Independent
- Record: 5–1–1
- Head coach: George B. Powell (2nd season)
- Home stadium: Dudley Field, El Paso High School Stadium

1925 Southern college football independents records
	Conf.			Overall
Team	W	L	T	W		L		T
Louisville		–		8	–	0	–	0
Georgetown		–		9	–	1	–	0
Howard		–		6	–	0	–	2
Texas Mines		–		5	–	1	–	1
Texas Tech		–		6	–	1	–	2
Stetson		–		6	–	2	–	1
Wake Forest		–		6	–	2	–	1
Davidson		–		6	–	2	–	2
George Washington		–		6	–	2	–	2
Navy		–		5	–	2	–	1
Texas A&I		–		4	–	2	–	1
William & Mary		–		6	–	4	–	0
Catholic University		–		4	–	4	–	0
Delaware		–		4	–	4	–	0
Spring Hill		–		4	–	4	–	0
Tennessee Docs		–		5	–	5	–	0
Duke		–		4	–	5	–	0
Middle Tennessee State Teachers		–		3	–	4	–	2
East Tennessee State Teachers		–		3	–	4	–	0
Western Kentucky State Normal		–		3	–	5	–	1
Georgia Normal		–		1	–	2	–	0
Richmond		–		3	–	6	–	0
Loyola (MD)		–		2	–	6	–	0
Delaware State		–		0	–	2	–	0
Mississippi State Teachers		–		0	–	6	–	0
West Tennessee State Teachers		–		0	–	7	–	1

The 1925 Texas Mines Miners football team was an American football team that represented Texas School of Mines (now known as the University of Texas at El Paso) as an independent during the 1925 college football season. The team compiled a 5–1–1 record and outscored opponents by a total of 118 to 57. The team's record was the best in school history to that point; only three prior Texas Mines team had compiled winning record, and those three teams had exceeded a .500 record by only a single game.

In June 1925, George B. Powell (commonly known as Chuck Powell), a mathematics instructor at the school, was reelected to serve a second year as the school's football coach. Powell had succeeded in 1924 in eliminating the football team's financial deficit for the first time in school history. Powell was also married in the summer of 1925 and planned to attend Knute Rockne's coaching school later in the summer.

Fullback Curley Waugh was the team captain and star player. After Waugh returned a kickoff 80 yards for a touchdown, the El Paso Times wrote: "The southwest has its own "Red" Grange." Left halfback "Doggy" Byrne also earned a reputation as "one of the best broken field runners in the southwest."

The team played four of its home games at El Paso's Dudley Field; one home game was played at the El Paso High School Stadium.

== Schedule ==
Date	Opponent	Site	Result	Source
October 17	at Sul Ross	Alpine, TX	L 7–31	
October 24	New Mexico	Dudley Field; El Paso, TX	W 19–2	
October 31	New Mexico Military	Dudley Field; El Paso, TX	W 28–0	
November 7	New Mexico A&M	Dudley Field; El Paso, TX	T 6–6	
November 11	El Paso JC	El Paso HS Stadium; El Paso, TX	W 12–6	
November 21	at New Mexico State Teachers	Ft. Bayard field; Silver City, NM	W 20–0	
November 28	Tempe State	Dudley Field; El Paso, TX	W 27–12	
