= 1925 William & Mary Indians football team =

American college football season

1925 William & Mary Indians football
- Conference: Independent
- Record: 7–4
- Head coach: J. Wilder Tasker (3rd season)
- Captain: F. Elliott

1925 Southern college football independents records
	Conf.			Overall
Team	W	L	T	W		L		T
Louisville		–		8	–	0	–	0
Georgetown		–		9	–	1	–	0
Howard		–		6	–	0	–	2
Texas Mines		–		5	–	1	–	1
Texas Tech		–		6	–	1	–	2
Stetson		–		6	–	2	–	1
Wake Forest		–		6	–	2	–	1
Davidson		–		6	–	2	–	2
George Washington		–		6	–	2	–	2
Navy		–		5	–	2	–	1
Texas A&I		–		4	–	2	–	1
William & Mary		–		6	–	4	–	0
Catholic University		–		4	–	4	–	0
Delaware		–		4	–	4	–	0
Spring Hill		–		4	–	4	–	0
Tennessee Docs		–		5	–	5	–	0
Duke		–		4	–	5	–	0
Middle Tennessee State Teachers		–		3	–	4	–	2
East Tennessee State Teachers		–		3	–	4	–	0
Western Kentucky State Normal		–		3	–	5	–	1
Georgia Normal		–		1	–	2	–	0
Richmond		–		3	–	6	–	0
Loyola (MD)		–		2	–	6	–	0
Delaware State		–		0	–	2	–	0
Mississippi State Teachers		–		0	–	6	–	0
West Tennessee State Teachers		–		0	–	7	–	1

The 1925 William & Mary Indians football team was an American football team that represented the College of William & Mary as an independent during the 1925 college football season. In its third season under head coach J. Wilder Tasker, William & Mary compiled a 7–4 record and outscored opponents by a total of 235 to 86.

== Schedule ==
Date	Opponent	Site	Result	Attendance	Source
September 19	Norfolk Marines	Williamsburg, VA	W 13–0		
September 26	Lenoir–Rhyne	Williamsburg, VA	W 44–0		
October 3	at Navy	Farragut Field; Annapolis, MD	L 0–25		
October 10	at Syracuse	Archbold Stadium; Syracuse, NY	L 0–33	10,000	
October 17	vs. Randolph–Macon	Richmon, VA	W 54–0		
October 24	vs. Duke	Norfolk, VA	W 35–0		
October 31	at Harvard	Harvard Stadium; Boston, MA	L 7–14		
November 7	Albright	Williamsburg, VA	W 27–0		
November 14	vs. Haskell	Richmond, VA	L 13–14	7,000	
November 21	at Roanoke	Mahar Field; Roanoke, VA	W 23–0		
November 26	at Richmond	Mayo Island Park; Richmond, VA (rivalry)	W 14–0		
