= 1925 Navy Midshipmen football team =

American college football season

1925 Navy Midshipmen football
- Conference: Independent
- Record: 5–2–1
- Head coach: Jack Owsley (1st season)
- Captain: August Lentz
- Home stadium: Farragut Field

1925 Southern college football independents records
	Conf.			Overall
Team	W	L	T	W		L		T
Louisville		–		8	–	0	–	0
Georgetown		–		9	–	1	–	0
Howard		–		6	–	0	–	2
Texas Mines		–		5	–	1	–	1
Texas Tech		–		6	–	1	–	2
Stetson		–		6	–	2	–	1
Wake Forest		–		6	–	2	–	1
Davidson		–		6	–	2	–	2
George Washington		–		6	–	2	–	2
Navy		–		5	–	2	–	1
Texas A&I		–		4	–	2	–	1
William & Mary		–		6	–	4	–	0
Catholic University		–		4	–	4	–	0
Delaware		–		4	–	4	–	0
Spring Hill		–		4	–	4	–	0
Tennessee Docs		–		5	–	5	–	0
Duke		–		4	–	5	–	0
Middle Tennessee State Teachers		–		3	–	4	–	2
East Tennessee State Teachers		–		3	–	4	–	0
Western Kentucky State Normal		–		3	–	5	–	1
Georgia Normal		–		1	–	2	–	0
Richmond		–		3	–	6	–	0
Loyola (MD)		–		2	–	6	–	0
Delaware State		–		0	–	2	–	0
Mississippi State Teachers		–		0	–	6	–	0
West Tennessee State Teachers		–		0	–	7	–	1

The 1925 Navy Midshipmen football team was an American football team that represented the United States Naval Academy as an independent during the 1925 college football season. In its first season under head coach Jack Owsley, the team compiled a 5–2–1 record, shut out four opponents, and outscored all opponents by a total of 134 to 81.

The annual Army–Navy Game was played on November 28 at the Polo Grounds in New York City; Army won 10–3.

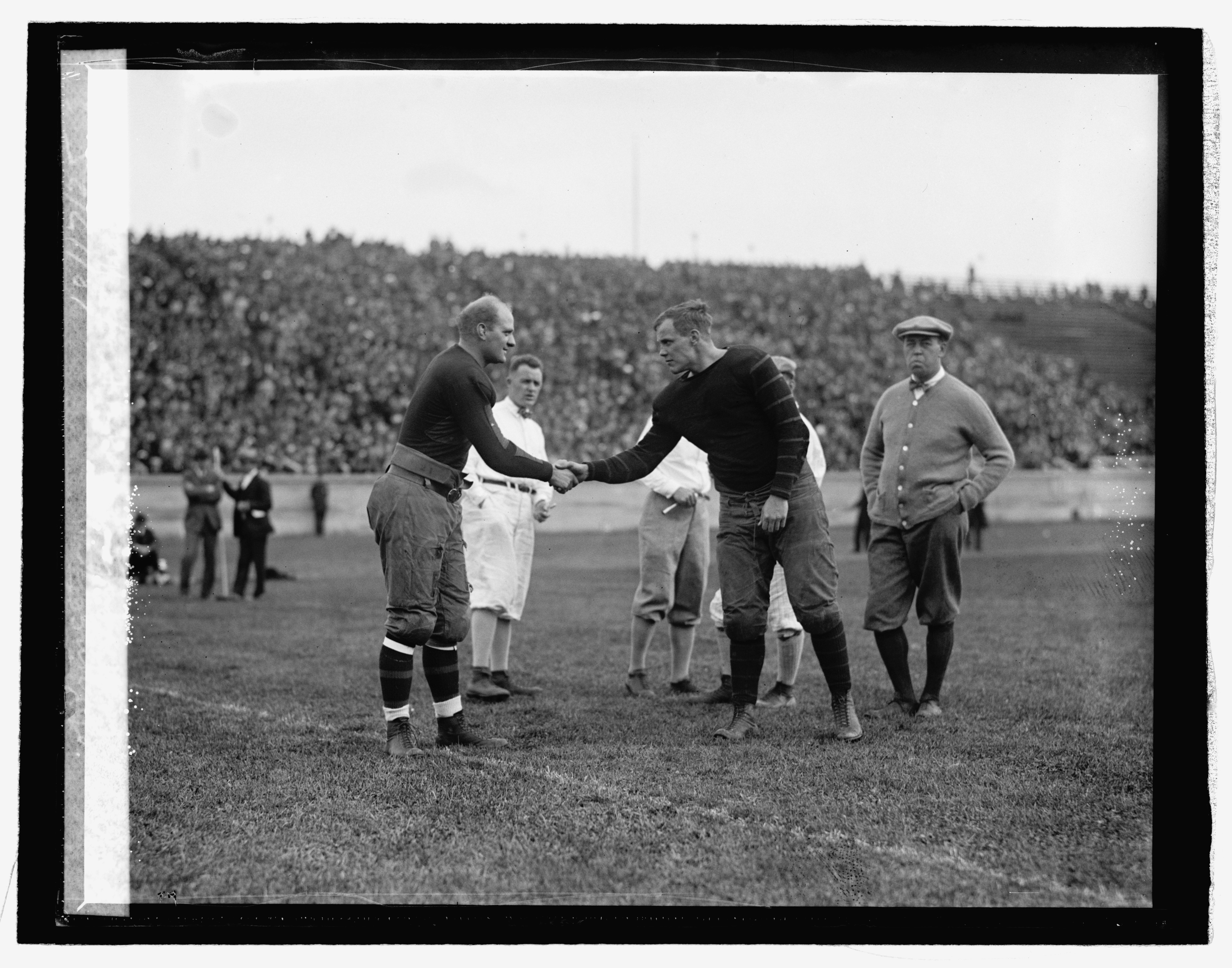

== Schedule ==
Date	Opponent	Site	Result	Attendance	Source
October 3	William & Mary	Farragut Field; Annapolis, MD	W 25–0		
October 10	Marquette	Farragut Field; Annapolis, MD	W 19–0		
October 17	vs. Princeton	Municipal Stadium; Baltimore, MD	T 10–10		
October 24	Washington College	Farragut Field; Annapolis, MD	W 37–0		
October 31	at Michigan	Ferry Field; Ann Arbor, MI	L 0–54	47,000	
November 7	Western Maryland	Farragut Field; Annapolis, MD	W 27–0		
November 14	Bucknell	Farragut Field; Annapolis, MD	W 13–7		
November 28	vs. Army	Polo Grounds; New York, NY (Army–Navy Game)	L 3–10	70,000	
