= 1925 Louisville Cardinals football team =

American college football season

1925 Louisville Cardinals football
- Conference: Independent
- Record: 8–0
- Head coach: Tom King (1st season)
- Home stadium: Parkway Field, Maxwell Field

1925 Southern college football independents records
	Conf.			Overall
Team	W	L	T	W		L		T
Louisville		–		8	–	0	–	0
Georgetown		–		9	–	1	–	0
Howard		–		6	–	0	–	2
Texas Mines		–		5	–	1	–	1
Texas Tech		–		6	–	1	–	2
Stetson		–		6	–	2	–	1
Wake Forest		–		6	–	2	–	1
Davidson		–		6	–	2	–	2
George Washington		–		6	–	2	–	2
Navy		–		5	–	2	–	1
Texas A&I		–		4	–	2	–	1
William & Mary		–		6	–	4	–	0
Catholic University		–		4	–	4	–	0
Delaware		–		4	–	4	–	0
Spring Hill		–		4	–	4	–	0
Tennessee Docs		–		5	–	5	–	0
Duke		–		4	–	5	–	0
Middle Tennessee State Teachers		–		3	–	4	–	2
East Tennessee State Teachers		–		3	–	4	–	0
Western Kentucky State Normal		–		3	–	5	–	1
Georgia Normal		–		1	–	2	–	0
Richmond		–		3	–	6	–	0
Loyola (MD)		–		2	–	6	–	0
Delaware State		–		0	–	2	–	0
Mississippi State Teachers		–		0	–	6	–	0
West Tennessee State Teachers		–		0	–	7	–	1

The 1925 Louisville Cardinals football team represented the University of Louisville as an independent during the 1925 college football season. In their first season under head coach Tom King, the Cardinals compiled a perfect 8–0 record, shutting out seven of their eight opponents. The only points conceded were two safety points against Marshall. The team played three home games at Parkway Field and one at Maxwell Field in Louisville, Kentucky.

== Schedule ==
Date	Opponent	Site	Result	Attendance	Source
October 3	Evansville	Maxwell Field; Louisville, KY	W 20–0		
October 10	at Western Kentucky State Normal	Fairgrounds; Bowling Green, KY	W 6–0		
October 17	at Hanover	Hanover, IN	W 24–0		
October 24	Kentucky Wesleyan	Parkway Field; Louisville, KY	W 6–0		
October 30	at Transylvania	Thomas Field; Lexington, KY	W 7–0		
November 7	Rose Poly	Parkway Field; Louisville, KY	W 30–0		
November 21	Toledo	Parkway Field; Louisville, KY	W 33–0	4,000	
November 26	at Marshall	Central Field; Huntington, WV	W 7–2		
