= 1925 Texas Tech Matadors football team =

American college football season

1925 Texas Tech Matadors football
- 1925 Texas Tech football team
- Conference: Independent
- Record: 6–1–2
- Head coach: Ewing Y. Freeland (1st season)
- Offensive scheme: T formation
- Base defense: 7–2–2
- Captain: Windy Nicklaus
- Home stadium: South Plains Fairgrounds

1925 Southern college football independents records
| | Conf. | | | Overall |
| Team | W | L | T | W | | L | | T |
|---|---|---|---|---|---|---|---|---|
| Louisville | | – | | 8 | – | 0 | – | 0 |
| Georgetown | | – | | 9 | – | 1 | – | 0 |
| Howard | | – | | 6 | – | 0 | – | 2 |
| Texas Mines | | – | | 5 | – | 1 | – | 1 |
| Texas Tech | | – | | 6 | – | 1 | – | 2 |
| Stetson | | – | | 6 | – | 2 | – | 1 |
| Wake Forest | | – | | 6 | – | 2 | – | 1 |
| Davidson | | – | | 6 | – | 2 | – | 2 |
| George Washington | | – | | 6 | – | 2 | – | 2 |
| Navy | | – | | 5 | – | 2 | – | 1 |
| Texas A&I | | – | | 4 | – | 2 | – | 1 |
| William & Mary | | – | | 6 | – | 4 | – | 0 |
| Catholic University | | – | | 4 | – | 4 | – | 0 |
| Delaware | | – | | 4 | – | 4 | – | 0 |
| Spring Hill | | – | | 4 | – | 4 | – | 0 |
| Tennessee Docs | | – | | 5 | – | 5 | – | 0 |
| Duke | | – | | 4 | – | 5 | – | 0 |
| Middle Tennessee State Teachers | | – | | 3 | – | 4 | – | 2 |
| East Tennessee State Teachers | | – | | 3 | – | 4 | – | 0 |
| Western Kentucky State Normal | | – | | 3 | – | 5 | – | 1 |
| Georgia Normal | | – | | 1 | – | 2 | – | 0 |
| Richmond | | – | | 3 | – | 6 | – | 0 |
| Loyola (MD) | | – | | 2 | – | 6 | – | 0 |
| Delaware State | | – | | 0 | – | 2 | – | 0 |
| Mississippi State Teachers | | – | | 0 | – | 6 | – | 0 |
| West Tennessee State Teachers | | – | | 0 | – | 7 | – | 1 |

The 1925 Texas Tech Matadors football team was an American football team that represented Texas Technological College (now known as Texas Tech University) as an independent during the 1925 college football season. In its first season of intercollegiate football, Texas Tech compiled a 6–1–2 record. Windy Nicklaus was the team captain. The team played its home games at the South Plains Fairgrounds in Lubbock, Texas.

The school opened for business in the fall of 1925. University president Paul W. Horn presided over the first meeting of its faculty being held on September 15, 1925.

Ewing Y. Freeland was hired as the school's athletic director and coach in June 1925. He had been a star athlete at Vanderbilt and the coach at SMU in 1922 and 1923.

On October 17, 1925, the team won the first game in program history, defeating Montezuma College of New Mexico by a 30–0 score.

On November 5, 1925, Texas Tech defeated Wayland Baptist by a score that has been reported as either 120–0 or 115–0. It remains Texas Tech's only 100-point game.

Key players included D.C. "Preacher" Calloway who was inducted into the Texas Tech Hall of Honor in 1985.

== Schedule ==
| Date | Opponent | Site | Result | Attendance | Source |
|---|---|---|---|---|---|
| October 3 | McMurry | South Plains Fairgrounds; Lubbock, TX | T 0–0 | 8,000–10,000 | |
| October 9 | Austin | South Plains Fairgrounds; Lubbock, TX | T 3–3 | | |
| October 17 | Montezuma College | South Plains Fairgrounds; Lubbock, TX | W 30–0 | | |
| October 24 | Clarendon | South Plains Fairgrounds; Lubbock, TX | W 13–7 | | |
| October 31 | vs. Sul Ross | All-West Texas Exposition; San Angelo, TX | W 21–7 | | |
| November 5 | Wayland | South Plains Fairgrounds; Lubbock, TX | W 120–0 (115–0) | | |
| November 11 | at Abilene Christian | Abilene, TX | W 10–7 | 5,000 | |
| November 18 | at Howard Payne | Brownwood, TX | L 0–29 | | |
| November 26 | West Texas State | South Plains Fairgrounds; Lubbock, TX | W 13–12 | 10,000 | |

== Game summaries ==
=== McMurry ===
| | 1 | 2 | 3 | 4 | Total |
|---|---|---|---|---|---|
| Indians | 0 | 0 | 0 | 0 | 0 |
| Matadors | 0 | 0 | 0 | 0 | 0 |

The first intercollegiate game in school history was played in Lubbock on October 3, 1925, ending in a scoreless tie with McMurry. The Matadors attempted a 35-yard field goal at the end of the game; Texas Tech made the kick but the snap occurred after the time-keeper whistled that the game had ended.
