= 1925 Georgia Tech Golden Tornado football team =

American college football season

1925 Georgia Tech Golden Tornado football
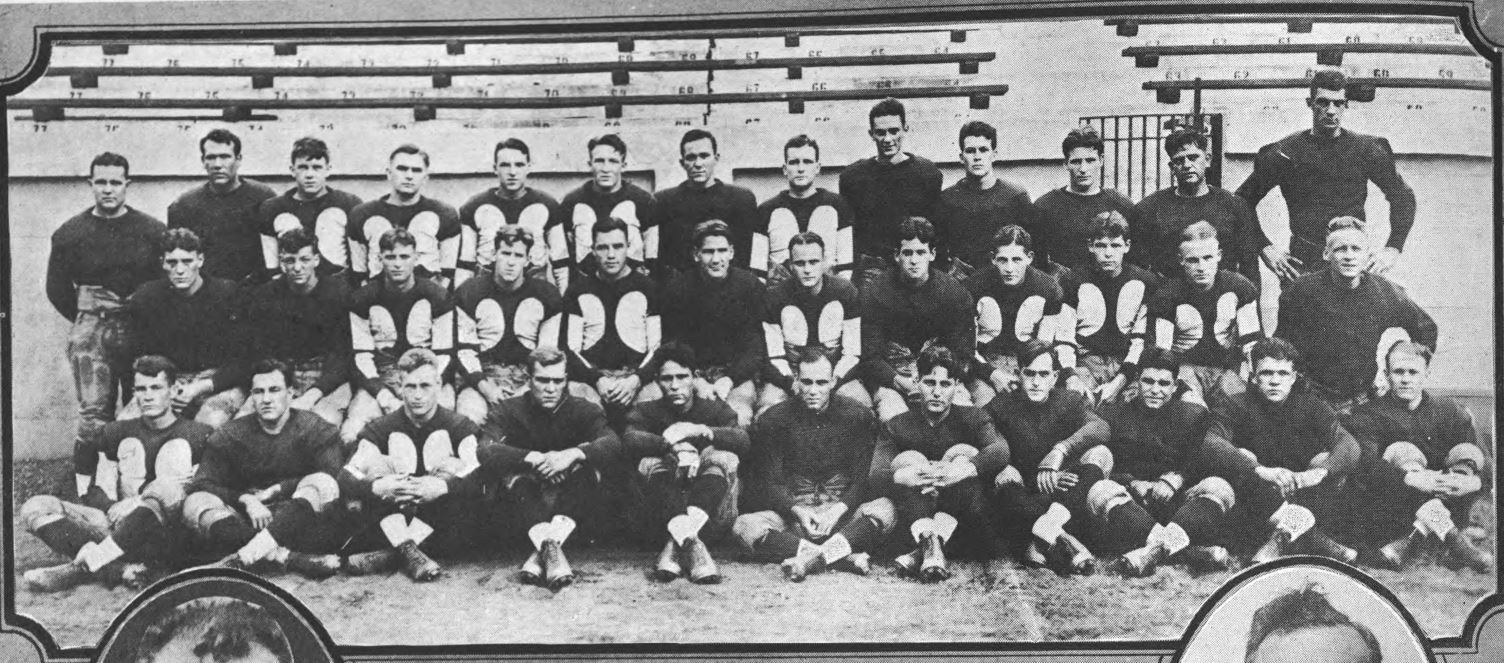
- Conference: Southern Conference
- Record: 6–2–1 (4–1–1 SoCon)
- Head coach: William Alexander (6th season)
- Offensive scheme: Jump shift
- Captain: Doug Wycoff
- Home stadium: Grant Field

Uniform
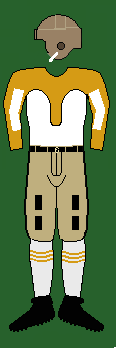

1925 Southern Conference football standings
	Conf.					Overall
Team	W		L		T	W		L		T
No. 2 Alabama +	7	–	0	–	0	10	–	0	–	0
No. 6 Tulane +	5	–	0	–	0	9	–	0	–	1
North Carolina	4	–	0	–	1	7	–	1	–	1
Washington and Lee	5	–	1	–	0	5	–	5	–	0
Virginia	4	–	1	–	1	7	–	1	–	1
Georgia Tech	4	–	1	–	1	6	–	2	–	1
Kentucky	4	–	2	–	0	6	–	3	–	0
Florida	3	–	2	–	0	8	–	2	–	0
Auburn	3	–	2	–	1	5	–	3	–	1
VPI	3	–	3	–	1	5	–	3	–	2
Vanderbilt	3	–	3	–	0	6	–	3	–	0
Tennessee	2	–	2	–	1	5	–	2	–	1
South Carolina	2	–	2	–	0	7	–	3	–	0
Georgia	2	–	4	–	0	4	–	5	–	0
Sewanee	1	–	4	–	0	4	–	4	–	1
Mississippi A&M	1	–	4	–	0	3	–	4	–	1
VMI	1	–	5	–	0	5	–	5	–	0
LSU	0	–	2	–	1	5	–	3	–	1
NC State	0	–	4	–	1	3	–	5	–	1
Ole Miss	0	–	4	–	0	5	–	5	–	0
Clemson	0	–	4	–	0	1	–	7	–	0
Maryland	0	–	4	–	0	2	–	5	–	1
+ – Conference co-champions; Rankings from Dickinson System

The 1925 Georgia Tech Golden Tornado football team (Note: Although Georgia Tech's teams are officially known as the "Yellow Jackets", northern writers called the team the "Golden Tornado" in 1917; the name was commonly used until 1928 and for many years afterwards as an alternate nickname. It may have been coined by Morgan Blake.) represented the Georgia Tech Golden Tornado of the Georgia Institute of Technology during the 1925 Southern Conference football season. The Tornado was coached by William Alexander in his sixth year as head coach, compiling a record of 6–2–1. The team was captained by Doug Wycoff. It had one of the best defenses in school history.

The team most notably beat Penn State. It suffered losses to national champion Alabama and the defending national champion Notre Dame Fighting Irish. It also had a surprise tie with rival Auburn.

== Before the season ==
1925 saw the south's widespread use of the forward pass. Coach William Alexander was a Heisman protege and utilized his "jump shift". Don Miller of Four Horsemen fame assisted Alexander in the backfield, and former star Tech tackle Bill Fincher assisted with the line.

Triple threat Doug Wycoff, mentioned for All-American by Lawrence Perry at the end of last year, was elected captain of the 1925 team, having been "the outstanding back of the South for the past two years." Coach Alexander called him "the best player ever to wear a cleat for Georgia Tech."

== Schedule ==
Date	Opponent	Site	Result	Attendance	Source
September 26	Oglethorpe*	Grant Field; Atlanta, GA	W 13–7	10,000	
October 3	VMI	Grant Field; Atlanta, GA	W 33–0		
October 10	vs. Penn State*	Yankee Stadium; Bronx, NY	W 16–7	8,000	
October 17	Florida	Grant Field; Atlanta, GA	W 23–7		
October 24	Alabama	Grant Field; Atlanta, GA (rivalry)	L 0–7	20,000	
October 31	Notre Dame*	Grant Field; Atlanta, GA (rivalry)	L 0–13	10,000	
November 7	Vanderbilt	Dudley Field; Nashville, TN (rivalry)	W 7–0	15,000	
November 14	Georgia	Grant Field; Atlanta, GA (rivalry)	W 3–0	35,000	
November 26	Auburn	Grant Field; Atlanta, GA (rivalry)	T 7–7	17,000	
*Non-conference game

== Game summaries ==
=== Week 1: Oglethorpe ===
Week 1: Oglethorpe at Georgia Tech

Team	1	2	3	4	Total
Oglethorpe	0	0	0	7	7
• Ga. Tech	0	6	0	7	13

- Date: September 26
- Location: Grant Field
  Atlanta, GA

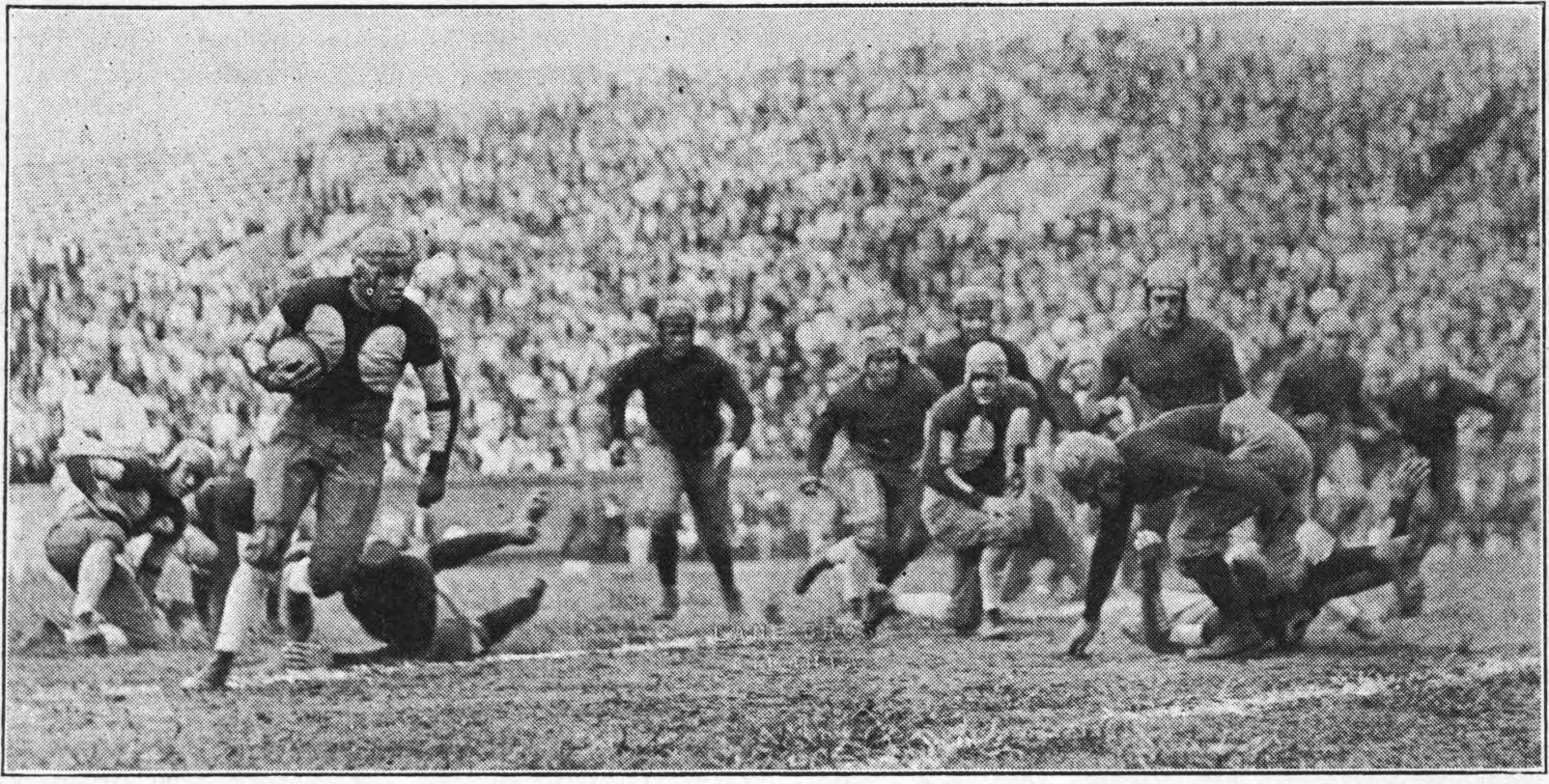
Doug Wycoff rushing against Oglethorpe's team

The season opened with a 13–7 defeat of Southern Intercollegiate Athletic Association (SIAA) champion Oglethorpe. (Note: Tech was in the SIAA before 1922.) Neither team scored in the first quarter, but in the second Wycoff went over for a 4-yard touchdown. The second Tech score came in the final quarter, when Carter Barron ran it in from 6 yards out following a long drive. A forward pass, Walsh to Campbell, got Oglethorpe's touchdown.

The starting lineup was Merkle (left end), Tharpe (left tackle), Godwin (left guard), Poole (center), Forrester (right guard), Carpenter (right tackle), Marshall (right end), Williams (quarterback), Barron (left halfback), Wycoff (right halfback), S. Murray (fullback).

=== Week 2: VMI ===
Week 2: V. M. I. at Georgia Tech

Team	1	2	3	4	Total
V. M. I.	0	0	0	0	0
• Ga. Tech	0	7	14	12	33

- Date: October 3
- Location: Grant Field
  Atlanta, GA
- Referee: Jogger Elcock

Tech beat VMI 33–0. In the second quarter, a pass from Murray to Wycoff added 24 yards. Carter Barron got it in from the 1-yard line some plays later. The next touchdown drive was highlighted by a 34-yard touchdown run. Murray scored yet another touchdown. A 26-yard pass was caught by Johnny Marshall, and Tech drove down to the 1-yard line when the final quarter started. Ike Williams went across for a touchdown. With substitutes in the backfield for most of the final period, John Brewer scored a touchdown on another triple pass play, this time from the 6-yard line.

The starting lineup was Irwin (left end), Tharpe (left tackle), Godwin (left guard), Poole (center), Forrester (right guard), Carpenter (right tackle), Marshall (right end), Williams (quarterback), Barron (left halfback), Wycoff (right halfback), S. Murray (fullback).

=== Week 3: vs. Penn State ===
Week 3: Georgia Tech at Penn State

Team	1	2	3	4	Total
• Ga. Tech	0	0	7	9	16
Penn St.	0	7	0	0	7

- Date: October 10
- Location: Yankee Stadium
  Bronx, NY
- Game attendance: 8,000
- Game weather: Wind
- Referee: C. J. McCarty (Germantown)

The third week brought the highlight of the year — a defeat of Hugo Bezdek's previously undefeated Penn State Nittany Lions 16–7 in a howling wind in Yankee Stadium. Tech utilized its shift on nearly every play. Penn State scored first after a punt by Doug Wycoff into the wind gave them the ball at Tech's 30-yard line. From here, Penn State threw a forward pass from a cross buck formation. Dangerfield shook off three tacklers on his way to the goal just as the half ended.

A similar thing happened to start the second half and give Tech its score. Penn State's Gray got off a bad punt into the wind, nearly over his own goal line. Using its shift to perfection, Wycoff eventually got over the tying touchdown. After a fumble recovery, an 80-yard drive utilizing Wycoff and Sam Murray ended in a Carter Barron touchdown for the third score. After an interception, Ike Williams also added a 25-yard field goal.

The starting lineup was Marshall (left end), Tharpe (left tackle), Godwin (left guard), Poole (center), Forrester (right guard), Carpenter (right tackle), Merkle (right end), Williams (quarterback), Wycoff (left halfback), Barron (right halfback), S. Murray (fullback).

=== Week 4: Florida ===
Week 4: Florida at Georgia Tech

Team	1	2	3	4	Total
Florida	0	0	7	0	7
• Ga. Tech	7	3	13	0	23

- Date: October 17
- Location: Grant Field
  Atlanta, GA

Tech beat Florida 23–7. The Gators made just five first downs to Tech's 15.

Doug Wycoff scored two touchdowns. Wycoff scored first, and Ike Williams added the extra point. In the second period, Williams made a 12-yard field goal. Wycoff and Sam Murray scored in the third period, with one extra point converted by Williams.

The starting lineup was Merkle (left end), Carpenter (left tackle), Forrester (left guard), Poole (center), Godwin (right guard), Tharpe (right tackle), Marshall (right end), Williams (quarterback), Wycoff (left halfback), Barron (right halfback), S. Murray (fullback).

=== Week 5: Alabama ===
Week 5: Alabama at Georgia Tech

Team	1	2	3	4	Total
• Alabama	0	0	7	0	7
Ga. Tech	0	0	0	0	0

- Date: October 24
- Location: Grant Field
  Atlanta, GA
- Game attendance: 20,000
- Game weather: Wet

The national champion Alabama Crimson Tide beat Georgia Tech 7–0 on a Johnny Mack Brown punt return for a touchdown. Pooley Hubert cleared two Tech players out of the way. "Hubert played the greatest game of his career and was called the greatest defensive back ever to appear on Grant Field". Tech turned the ball over on downs at the Alabama 28 and again at the Alabama 21. Star tackle Six Carpenter was injured. Tech was the only team all year to rush for more yardage and gain more first downs than Alabama.

The starting lineup was Merkle (left end), Tharpe (left tackle), Godwin (left guard), Poole (center), Forrester (right guard), Carpenter (right tackle), Marshall (right end), Williams (quarterback), Wycoff (left halfback), Barron (right halfback), S. Murray (fullback).

=== Week 6: Notre Dame ===
Week 6: Notre Dame at Georgia Tech

Team	1	2	3	4	Total
• Notre Dame	6	7	0	0	13
Ga. Tech	0	0	0	0	0

- Date: October 31
- Location: Grant Field
  Atlanta, GA
- Game attendance: 10,000
- Game weather: Cold rain
- Referee: Frank Birch

Resembling its old form, Knute Rockne's defending national champion Notre Dame Fighting Irish defeated Georgia Tech 13–0. The game was played in a cold rain, and Tech played its substitutes aside from Walt Godwin. All scores were made in the first half.

An interception by Red Edwards set up the first score. Christie Flanagan was the star for the Irish.

The starting lineup was Irwin (left end), Hood (left tackle), Godwin (left guard), Elliott (center), Angley (right guard), Hearn (right tackle), Crowley (right end), Morse (quarterback), Vaughan Connelly (left halfback), Brewer (right halfback), Holland (fullback).

=== Week 7: at Vanderbilt ===
Week 7: Vanderbilt at Georgia Tech

Team	1	2	3	4	Total
Vanderbilt	0	0	0	0	0
• Ga. Tech	0	0	0	7	7

- Date: November 7
- Location: Grant Field
  Atlanta, GA
- Referee: Ed Finlay

Describing the most spectacular play he ever saw, coach William Alexander cites one from the 1925 game against the Vanderbilt Commodores. Wycoff was hurt, such that he elected to use his substitute Dick Wright with only minutes to go in the game. On a muddy field, Wright ran off tackle and dodged Vanderbilt's safety Gil Reese, "usually a sure tackler," to get the touchdown with a run to give Tech a 7–0 victory. The yearbook remarked, Wright "should have run for governor of Georgia right after he ran 56 yards against Vandy."

The starting lineup was Merkle (left end), Tharpe (left tackle), Godwin (left guard), Poole (center), Forrester (right guard), Cooper (right tackle), Marshall (right end), Williams (quarterback), Wycoff (left halfback), Barron (right halfback), S. Murray (fullback)

=== Week 8: Georgia ===
Week 8: Georgia at Georgia Tech

Team	1	2	3	4	Total
Georgia	0	0	0	0	0
• Ga. Tech	0	0	3	0	3

- Date: November 14
- Location: Grant Field
  Atlanta, GA
- Game attendance: 35,000
- Referee: Gardner (Big Ten)

Rivals Georgia and Georgia Tech met for the first time since 1916. A third-quarter field goal by Ike Williams was the only scoring in the game, giving Georgia Tech a 3–0 victory.

Georgia end Smack Thompson would yell out in his sleep, and had said "Kill the SOB" in reference to Doug Wycoff leading up to the game. Once during the game, the two collided with each other, knocking each unconscious.

The starting lineup was Merckle (left end), Tharpe (left tackle), Godwin (left guard), Poole (center), Forrester (right guard), Fair (right tackle), Marshall (right end), Williams (quarterback), Wycoff (left halfback), Barron (right halfback), S. Murray (fullback).

=== Week 9: Auburn ===
Auburn surprised with a 7–7 tie in the final week. Doug Wycoff scored Tech's touchdown. Pea Green caught a 9-yard pass from Frank Tuxworth on Auburn's score, after a blocked Wycoff punt.

== Postseason ==
=== Awards and honors ===
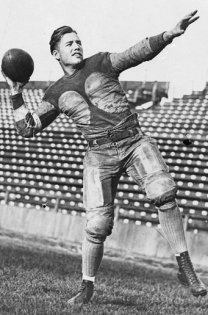
Doug Wycoff

Doug Wycoff received 21 of a possible 32 first-team All-Southern selections of the Associated Press composite. Center Owen Poole got six. Guard Walt Godwin also made some All-Southern teams, and tackle Six Carpenter made second-team All-Southern for Norman E. Brown.

Godwin was named to Knute Rockne's All-America team. Wycoff and end Gus Merkle made Billy Evans's "National Honor Roll."

=== Legacy ===
Coach Alexander recalled "The work of Douglas Wycoff against Notre Dame two years in succession was brilliant in the extreme, as was his plunging against Penn. State when we defeated them twice." Morgan Blake, sports writer for the Atlanta Journal, said of an all-time All-Southern list: "It seems to us that one name is left out in this collection, who may have been the best all-around player the South has had.

"We have reference to Doug Wycoff of Tech who, for three straight years, was practically the unanimous all-Southern football choice, despite the fact that Georgia Tech had very lean years during his period of play at this institution. If Wycoff had been flanked by such a pair of halfbacks as Red Barron and Buck Flowers, or Thomason and Mizell while he was with the Jackets, he would have been an all-American. As it was he had to carry all of the offensive load and on the defense he was a wheelhorse. He was a great punter and passer. If Wycoff was not the best all-around player the South had produced then he was very close to the peak."

== Personnel ==
=== Depth chart ===
The following chart depicts Tech's lineup during the 1925 season with games started at the position shown in parentheses. The chart mimics the offense after the jump shift has taken place.

LE
Gus Merkle (5)
Bull Irwin (2)
Johnny Marshall (1)

LT	LG	C	RG	RT
Mack Tharpe (6)	Walt Godwin (6)	Owen Pool (7)	Wally Forrester (6)	Six Carpenter (4)
Six Carpenter (1)	Wally Forrester (1)	Red Elliott (1)	Tom Angley (1)	Bus Cooper (1)
Papa Hood (1)	Firpo Martin (0)		Walt Godwin (1)	Dick Fair (1)
				Tiny Hearn (1)
				Mack Tharpe (1)

RE
Johnny Marshall (6)
Ed Crowley (1)
Gus Merkle (1)
John Murray (0)

QB
Ike Williams (7)
Finley McRae (1)
John Brewer (0)

RHB
Carter Barron (5)
Doug Wycoff (2)
John Brewer (1)

FB
Sam Murray (7)
Ralph Holland (1)

LHB
Doug Wycoff (5)
Carter Barron (2)
Vaughan Connelly (1)
Dick Wright (0)

=== Lettermen ===
==== Line ====
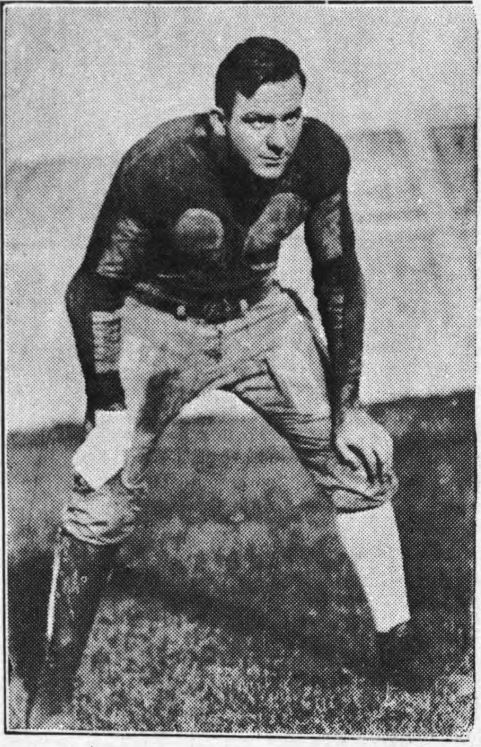
Gus Merkle

Number	Player	Position	Games started	Hometown	Prep school	Height	Weight	Age
64	Tom Angley	Guard	1	Baltimore, Maryland	University School	5'8"	190	21
5	Six Carpenter	Tackle	4	Newnan, Georgia				
17	Bus Cooper	Tackle	1					
21	Ed Crowley	End	1	Watkinsville, Georgia		6'1"	180	19
11	Red Elliott	Center	1	Minnesota				
53	Dick Fair	Tackle	1	Atlanta, Georgia				
15	Wally Forrester	Guard	5	Leesburg, Georgia	Gordon Institute			
22	Gaston	Tackle						
36	Walt Godwin	Guard	6			5'7"	200	27
23	Papa Hood	Tackle	1				220	
10	Tiny Hearn	Tackle	1		GMA			
49	Bull Irwin	End	2	Atlanta, Georgia				
3	John Lillard	Guard						
54	Johnny Marshall	End	5	Jacksonville, Florida	Duval High School			21
6	Firpo Martin	Guard			GMA			
14	Gus Merkle	End	3					
12	John Murray	End						
13	Owen Poole	Center	5		Boys High School		155	
24	Mack Tharpe	Tackle	4	Moultrie, Georgia				22
2	Ken Thrash	Tackle		Orlando, Florida				19

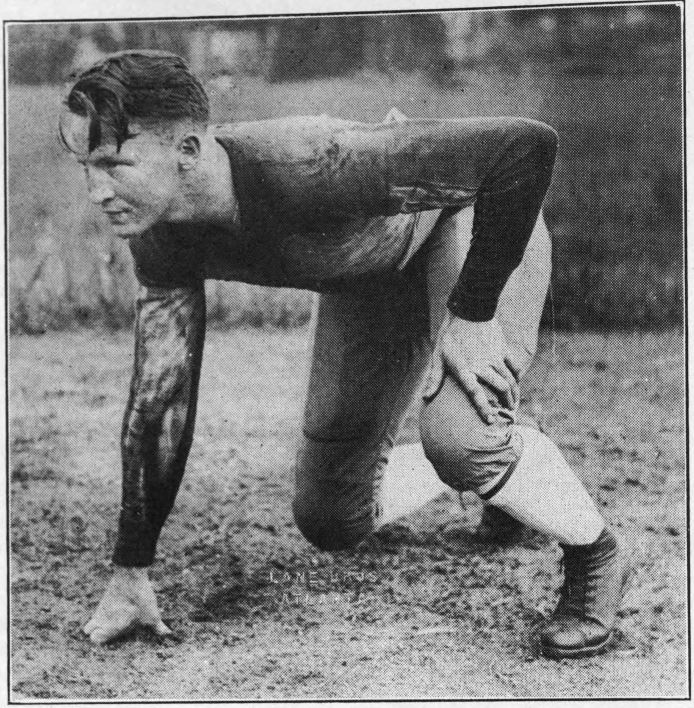
Carter Barron

==== Backfield ====
Number	Player	Position	Games started	Hometown	Prep school	Height	Weight	Age
1	Carter Barron	Halfback	6	Clarkesville, Georgia				20
19	John Brewer	Quarterback, halfback	1	Griffin, Georgia		6'0"	185	19
33	Vaughan Connelly	Halfback	1	Atlanta, Georgia				23
62	Ralph Holland	Fullback	1	Atlanta, Georgia				
12	Sam Murray	Fullback	5					
4	Finley McRae	Quarterback						
39	Ike Williams	Quarterback	5	Little Rock, Arkansas	Central H. S.	5'10"	180	22
70	Dick Wright	Halfback		Sumter, South Carolina				
27	Doug Wycoff	Halfback	8	Little Rock, Arkansas	Central H. S.	6'2"	195	22

=== Substitutes ===
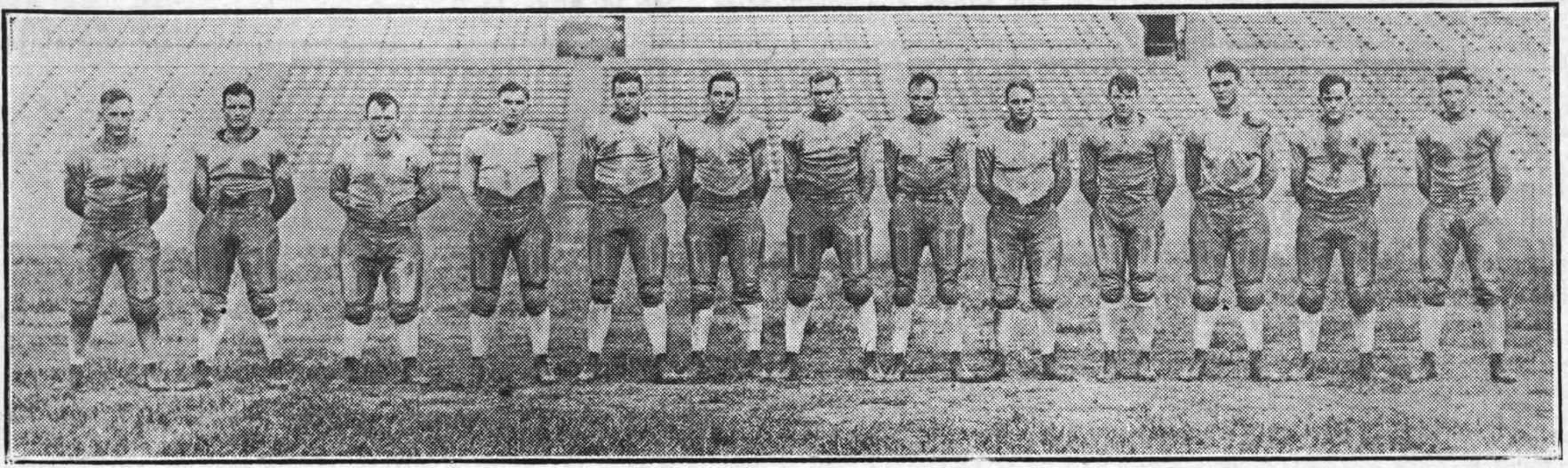
1925 Georgia Tech lettermen, from left to right: Bull Irwin, Johnny Marshall, Walt Godwin, Vaughan Connelly, Doug Wycoff, Gus Merkle, Six Carpenter, Owen Poole, Ike Williams, Murray (unsure which), Mack Tharpe, Wally Forrester, and Carter Barron.

==== Unlisted ====
Number	Player
18	Read
28	Williamson
34	Sprick
41	Kid Carson
42	Rauber
44	McDaniell
50	Jamieson
51	Diamond
81	Harlow
84	Ralph Bullard

== See also ==
- 1925 Southern Conference football season
- 1925 College Football All-Southern Team
- 1925 College Football All-America Team
