= 1926 College Football All-Southern Team =

American all-star college football team

The 1926 College Football All-Southern Team consists of American football players selected to the College Football All-Southern Teams selected by various organizations for the 1926 Southern Conference football season. Alabama won the SoCon and national championship.

== Composite eleven ==
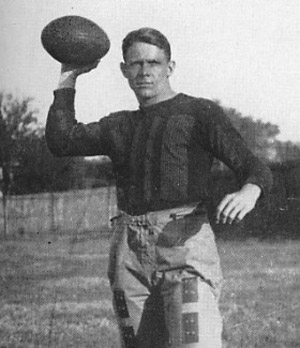
Bill Spears.

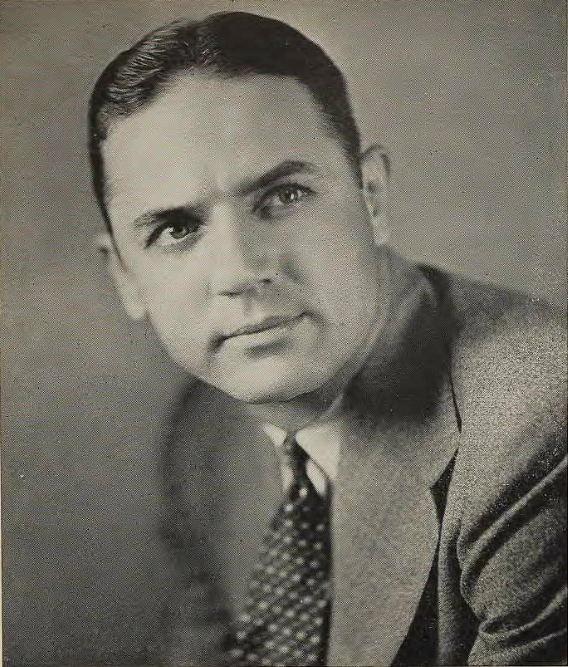
John Barnhill as coach.

The All-Southern eleven compiled by the Associated Press included:

- Red Barnes, quarterback for Alabama, professional baseball outfielder with Washington Senators and the Chicago White Sox.
- John Barnhill, tackle for Tennessee, later head coach at his alma mater.
- Herschel Caldwell, end for Alabama, made the extra point to tie Stanford in the Rose Bowl. Caldwell was called by one source "one of the greatest defensive backs the South has produced in years." He later assisted coach Wallace Wade at Duke University.
- Gordon Holmes, center for Alabama, got a case of appendicitis en route to the Rose Bowl while in El Paso, and was left there with the idea of Babe Pearce filling in for Holmes. Holmes let his doctors know he would catch the next train to Pasadena.
- Curtis Luckey, tackle for Georgia, known in his time as one of the best linemen in the South.
- Charles Mackall, guard and captain for Virginia, led the Southern Conference in field goals in 1926 with four. He won the Virginia state amateur golf championship in 1927.
- George Morton, halfback for Georgia. In the rivalry game at Grant Field with Georgia Tech, Georgia found itself down 13 to 0 at the half. Herdis McCrary and Morton led a comeback, winning 14 to 13. Known as the best all-round athlete that Episcopal High School has ever produced.
- Fred Pickhard, guard for Alabama, blocked the punt against Sewanee, leading to the safety which secured the game and the undefeated season. Just 16 punts were blocked all year for scores in college football, and Pickhard had three of them. He was selected Most Valuable Player of the 1927 Rose Bowl in which Alabama tied Stanford. He then had a long career with the Goodyear Tire & Rubber Company in Portland, Oregon as a service manager.
- Ty Rauber, fullback for Washington and Lee, third-team AP All-American. He was later a special agent with the FBI.
- Bill Spears, quarterback for Vanderbilt, second-team AP All-American, inducted into the College Football Hall of Fame in 1962.
- Hoyt Winslett, end for Alabama, first Southern player elected first-team AP All-American. He was recently shifted from the backfield to end, and was a renowned passer connecting many times with Caldwell.

== Composite overview ==
Hoyt Winslett received the most votes, 37 of a possible 41.

Name	Position	School	First-team selections
Hoyt Winslett	End	Alabama	37
Bill Spears	Quarterback	Vanderbilt	31
Ty Rauber	Fullback	Washington & Lee	27
Fred Pickhard	Guard	Alabama	25
Curtis Luckey	Tackle	Georgia	20
George Morton	Halfback	Georgia	18
Red Barnes	Halfback	Alabama	17
John Barnhill	Tackle	Tennessee	15
Charles Mackall	Guard	Virginia	15
Herschel Caldwell	End	Alabama	13
Johnny Marshall	End	Georgia Tech	11
Mack Tharpe	Tackle	Georgia Tech	11
Gordon Holmes	Center	Alabama	11
Ox McKibbon	Tackle	Vanderbilt	9
Bill Rogers	Quarterback	South Carolina	9
Carter Barron	Halfback	Georgia Tech	9
Owen Pool	Center	Georgia Tech	8
Harry Gamble	End	Tulane	7
Claude Perry	Guard	Alabama	7
Tolbert Brown	Fullback	Alabama	7
Orin Helvey	Guard	Sewanee	6
Myron Stevens	Halfback	Maryland	6

== All-Southerns of 1926 ==
=== Ends ===
- Hoyt Winslett, Alabama (C, UP-1, S, SWI)
- Herschel Caldwell, Alabama (C, UP-2 [as hb])
- Johnny Marshall, Georgia Tech (C, S, SWI)
- Harry Gamble, Tulane (C, UP-1)
- Larry Creson, Vanderbilt (UP-2)
- Ap Applewhite, Mississippi (UP-2)

=== Tackles ===
- Curtis Luckey, Georgia (C, S, UP-2)
- John Barnhill, Tennessee (C)
- Mack Tharpe, Georgia Tech (C, UP-2, SWI)
- Ox McKibbon, Vanderbilt (C)
- Jess Tinsley, LSU (UP-2)

=== Guards ===
- Fred Pickhard, Alabama (C, UP-1 [as t], S [as t], SWI [as t])
- Charles Mackall, Virginia (C, S, SWI)
- Claude Perry, Alabama (C, UP-1 [as t])
- Orin "Mount" Helvey, Sewanee (C, UP-2 [as fb])
- John Barnhill, Tennessee (UP-1)
- Herman Salter, Auburn (UP-1)
- Ellis Hagler, Alabama (S)
- Ernest Rogers, Georgia (UP-2, SWI)

=== Centers ===
- Gordon Holmes, Alabama (C, S)
- Owen Pool, Georgia Tech (C, SWI)
- Elvin Butcher, Tennessee (UP-1)
- Vernon Sharpe, Vanderbilt (UP-2)

=== Quarterbacks ===
- Bill Spears, Vanderbilt (College Football Hall of Fame) (C, UP-1, S, SWI [as hb])
- Bill Rogers, South Carolina (C)

=== Halfbacks ===
- George Morton, Georgia (C, UP-1, S, SWI)
- Red Barnes, Alabama (C, UP-1, SWI [as qb])
- Carter Barron, Georgia Tech (C, UP-2 [as qb])
- Myron Stevens, Maryland (C)
- Neil Cargile, Vanderbilt (UP-2)

=== Fullbacks ===
- Ty Rauber, Washington & Lee (C, UP-1, S [as hb], SWI)
- Tolbert Brown, Alabama (C)
- Dick Dodson, Tennessee (S)

== Key ==
Bold = Composite selection

C = received votes for an All-Southern eleven compiled by the Associated Press.

UP = compiled by the United Press.

S = selected by UGA athletic director Herman Stegeman.

SWI = selected by S. W. Inman, Jr.

== See also ==
- 1926 College Football All-America Team
