= Gordon Holmes =

Gordon Holmes may refer to:

- The pseudonym of the journalist Louis Tracy (1863–1928)
- Sir Gordon Morgan Holmes (1876–1965), Anglo-Irish neurologist
- Gordon Holmes, lab technician who shot a home video he claims may show the Loch Ness Monster
- Gordon Holmes (American football) (c. 1905 – 1963), American football player
- Gordon Holmes (suffragette) (1884–1951), British stockbroker, suffragette, trade unionist, and author
