= Tolbert Brown =

American football player

Profile
- Position: Halfback/End

Personal information
- Born: c. 1906; Dothan, Alabama, U.S.

Career information
- High school: Dothan
- College: Alabama (1925–1927)

Awards and highlights
- 2× National champion (1925, 1926); All-Southern (1926)

Tolbert "Red" Brown was a college football player. He was the brother of Johnny Mack Brown. Brown was selected All-Southern by some writers in 1926.

== Early life ==
Brown was a native of Dothan, Alabama, the third of nine children. He was captain of the Dothan High football team in 1923.

== University of Alabama ==
=== 1925 ===
Brown played at end, while his brother "Mack" played at halfback in 1925.
