= Goodsprings, Alabama =

- Unincorporated community
- Location within Alabama Location within the United States
- Coordinates: 33°40′08″N 87°13′54″W
- Country: United States
- State: Alabama
- County: Walker
- Elevation: 591 ft (180 m)
- Time zone: UTC-6 (Central (CST))
  - Summer (DST): UTC-5 (CDT)
- ZIP code: 35560
- Area codes: 205, 659
- GNIS feature ID: 119148

Goodsprings is an unincorporated community in Walker County, Alabama, United States. Its ZIP code is 35560.

== Notable person ==
- Claude Perry, offensive tackle for the Green Bay Packers from 1927 to 1935
