= Bill Rogers (quarterback) =

American football, baseball, and basketball player

Profile
- Position: Quarterback

Career information
- College: South Carolina (1924–1926)

Awards and highlights
- All-Southern (1926); South Carolina Athletics Hall of Fame

Bill Rogers was a college football, baseball, and basketball player for the South Carolina Gamecocks of the University of South Carolina.

== Gamecocks ==
Rogers earned nine varsity letters in his time at South Carolina.

=== Football ===
On Branch Bocock's football teams, he was quarterback and punter. Once against rival Clemson Rogers picked up his own punt, which had bounced off a Clemson player, and ran seventeen yards for a 10 to 0 lead in what would be a 33 to 0 victory. Rogers was selected All-Southern in 1926. With Rogers leading the football team for three years, it went 20–10.

=== Basketball ===
The basketball team went 33–16 while Rogers was on the team. He scored 345 points in 47 career games.

Rogers was elected to the South Carolina Athletics Hall of Fame in 1969.
