= Jasper High School (Alabama) =

Location
- 1501 Viking Drive; Jasper, Alabama 35501; United States
- 33.834688°N 87.264973°W

Information
- Other name: JHS
- Former name: Walker High School
- Type: Public high school
- School district: Jasper City Schools
- NCES School ID: 010189000678
- Teaching staff: 54.00 (on an FTE basis)
- Grades: 9–12
- Enrollment: 829 (2023-2024)
- Student to teacher ratio: 15.35
- Colors: Old gold and black
- Athletics conference: AHSAA Class 6A
- Mascot: Ike the Vike
- Nickname: Vikings
- Rival: Cullman High School
- Newspaper: The Viking
- Website: jhs.jasper.k12.al.us

Jasper High School (JHS, formerly Walker High School) is a public high school in Jasper, Alabama, United States. It is part of the Jasper City Schools district.

On June 20, 2016, the Jasper City Board of Education voted to rename the school to its current name, which came into effect in the 2017–2018 academic year. Then what was Maddox Middle School merged with the High School and became Jasper Junior High School.

== Athletics ==
The Jasper athletic department fields eleven boys and ten girls sports, which all compete in the (6A) classification of Alabama High School Athletic Association (AHSAA). Boys sports offered are basketball, baseball, cross country, indoor track, outdoor track, football, wrestling, tennis, golf, soccer, and swimming and diving. Girls sports offered are basketball, softball, cross country, indoor track, outdoor track, volleyball, tennis, golf, soccer, and swimming and diving. The Jasper High School Vikings currently hold 26 AHSAA state championship titles (15 boys, 11 girls).

Football: The Jasper High School football team competes in Class 6A of AHSAA. The team was first organized in 1920 and has an all-time record of 621-404-33. JHS football has accomplished 77 winning seasons out of 105. The longest serving head football coach in school history is Joe Gambrell, who served from 1952-1966 and compiled a record of 86-50-10. The football stadium was later named Ki Ro/Gambrell field after Coach Gambrell. The Viking’s longest-running football rivalry is with Cullman High School, trailing in the series 36-37-2. Jasper football currently holds 10 region championships in 1976, 1977, 1980, 1997, 1998, 1999, 2012, 2015, 2018, and 2019. The team reached its first playoff appearance in 1976 and playoff win in 1977. Since, The Vikings have had 25 playoff appearances and finished state runner-up in 1977.

Boys Basketball: The Jasper High School boys basketball team competes in Class 6A of AHSAA. The team was first organized in 1920. The longest-serving head basketball coach in school history is Phil Schumacher, who served from 1973-1997. JHS boys basketball currently holds 10 area championships in 1993, 1994, 2007, 2008, 2009, 2010, 2011, 2014, 2019, and 2020. The team has had multiple playoff appearances, making it to the Elite 8 in 1989 and 2020, and the Final Four in 1922, 1932, and 1934.

Baseball: The Jasper High School baseball team competes in Class 6A of AHSAA. The team is coached by Patrick Ware, who has served from 2005–present and is the longest-serving head baseball coach in school history. Ware has led The Vikings to nine area titles. JHS baseball currently holds 13 area championships in 1995, 2001, 2002, 2004, 2010, 2011, 2012, 2014, 2017, 2018, 2019, 2021, and 2022. The team has had multiple playoff appearances, making it to the Elite 8 in 2002, 2010, 2014, and 2016.

Boys Soccer: The Jasper High School boys soccer team currently holds two section championships in 2015 and 2016.

Boys Tennis: The Jasper High School boys tennis program currently holds 10 AHSAA state championships in 1999, 2000, 2001, 2003, 2006, 2007, 2008, 2010, 2016, and 2018. The team also holds four runner-up finishes in 2005, 2009, 2015, and 2024.

Boys Golf: The Jasper High School boys golf program currently holds two AHSAA state championships in 1981 and 1984.

Wrestling: The Jasper High School wrestling program currently holds two AHSAA state championships in 1971 and 2023. The team also has one championship in the Dual format in 2023.

Softball: The Jasper High School softball team competes in Class 6A of AHSAA. Jasper softball holds seven area championships in 2016, 2017, 2018, 2021, 2022, 2023, and 2024. The team has had numerous playoff appearances, making it to the Elite 8 in 1990, 1993, 1997, 1998, 1999, 2017, and 2023. The Jasper High School softball program currently holds three AHSAA slow pitch state championships in 1994, 1995, and 1996 and one fast pitch state championship in 2024.

Girls Basketball: The Jasper High School girls basketball team competes in Class 6A of AHSAA. The team is coached by Anna Barnett, who has served from 2017–present. Jasper girls basketball currently holds nine area championships in 1989, 1990, 1993, 1994, 1996, 1997, 1998, 2023, and 2024. The team has had multiple playoff appearances, making it to the Elite 8 in 1989, 1990, and 2023. The Jasper High School girls basketball program currently holds one AHSAA state championship in 2024.

Volleyball: The Jasper High School volleyball team competes in Class 6A of AHSAA. The team is coached by Bobby Daniels. Daniels has coached from 2015–present and holds a 443-105 record. The team holds 14 area championships in 1993, 1995, 2010, 2013, 2014, 2015, 2016, 2017, 2018, 2019, 2020, 2021, 2022, and 2023. The team has had numerous playoff appearances, making it to the Elite 8 in 2013, 2015, 2016, and 2022, and the Final Four in 2014 and 2017. The Jasper High School volleyball program currently holds two AHSAA state championships in 2018 and 2019.

Girls Soccer: The Jasper High School girls soccer team currently holds one section championship in 2019.

Girls Tennis: The Jasper High School girls tennis program currently holds two AHSAA state championships in 2003 and 2015. The team also holds six runner-up finishes in 2008, 2009, 2010, 2014, 2016, and 2019.

Girls Golf: The Jasper High School girls golf program currently holds two AHSAA state championships in 1988 and 1989.

== Notable alumni ==
- Ronnie Coleman, football player, Houston Oilers, 1974-1981
- Bruce Jones, football player, Green Bay Packers, 1927-1934
- Tom Bevill, member, United States Congress
- George Lindsey (1928-2012), actor
- Slick Lollar, football player, Green Bay Packers, 1938
- Myron Mitchell, football player, Minnesota Vikings (2021-2022), Michigan Panthers (2023), Birmingham Stallions (2023–present)
- Claude Perry, football player, Green Bay Packers, 1927-1935
