= Bruce Jones (American football) =

American football player (1904–1974)

No. 24, 23
- Position: Guard

Personal information
- Born: August 30, 1904; Jasper, Alabama, U.S.
- Died: December 18, 1974 (aged 70); Tuscaloosa, Alabama, U.S.
- Listed height: 6 ft 1 in (1.85 m)
- Listed weight: 219 lb (99 kg)

Career information
- High school: Jasper (AL)
- College: Alabama

Career history
- Green Bay Packers (1927–1928); Newark Tornadoes (1930); Brooklyn Dodgers (1932–1934)

Awards and highlights
- 2× National champion (1925, 1926)
- Stats at Pro Football Reference

Robert Bruce "Buck" Jones (August 30, 1904 – December 18, 1974) was an American football guard for six seasons for the Green Bay Packers, Newark Tornadoes, and Brooklyn Dodgers of the National Football League (NFL).
