= Tom Angley =

American baseball player (1904–1952)

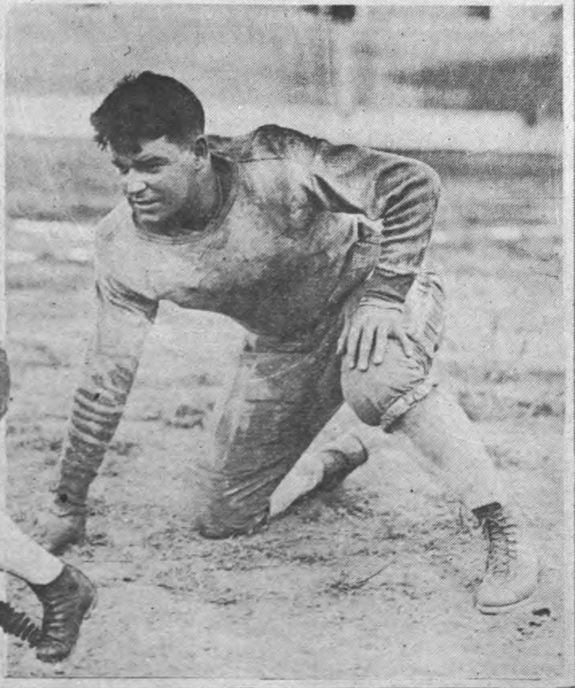
- Angley with the 1925 Georgia Tech Golden Tornado football team
- Catcher
- Born: October 2, 1904; Baltimore, Maryland, U.S.
- Died: October 26, 1952 (aged 48); Wichita, Kansas, U.S.
- Batted: Left Threw: Right

MLB debut
- April 23, 1929, for the Chicago Cubs

Last MLB appearance
- April 30, 1929, for the Chicago Cubs

MLB statistics
- Games played: 5
- Batting average: .250
- Runs batted in: 6
- Stats at Baseball Reference

Teams
- Chicago Cubs (1929)

Thomas Samuel Angley (October 2, 1904 – October 26, 1952) was a Major League Baseball catcher for the Chicago Cubs in April 1929. He was a native of Baltimore, Maryland and attended Georgia Tech.

In Angley's career, he had 6 RBI in 16 at bats. In five games he was 4-for-16 (.250) with one double and two walks. He also handled 30 of 31 chances successfully in the field.
