= Myron Mitchell =

American gridiron football player (born 1998)

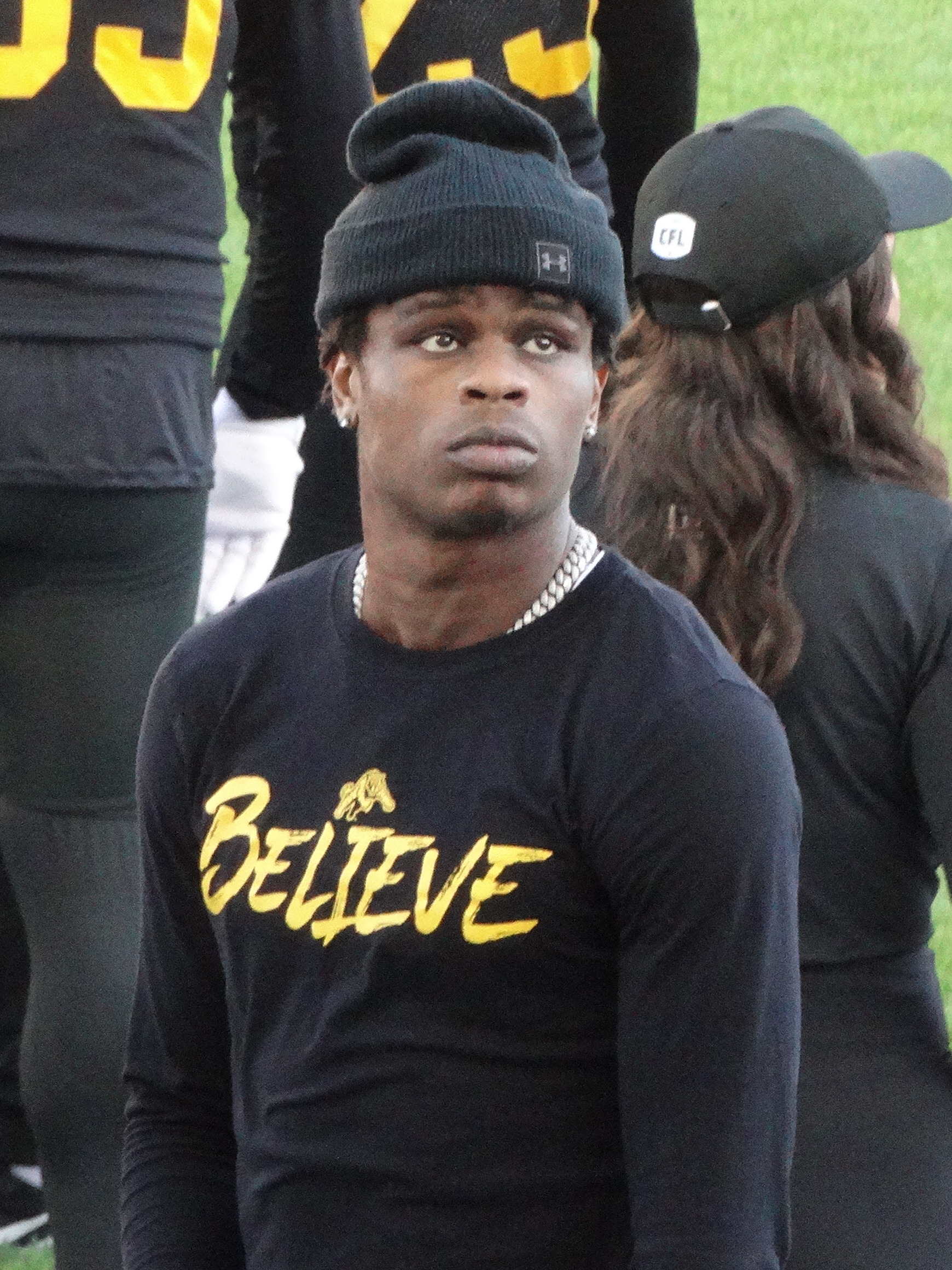
- Mitchell with the Hamilton Tiger-Cats in 2025

No. 7 – Hamilton Tiger-Cats
- Position: Wide receiver
- Roster status: Active
- CFL status: American

Personal information
- Born: June 17, 1998 (age 28); Jasper, Alabama, U.S.
- Listed height: 6 ft 1 in (1.85 m)
- Listed weight: 180 lb (82 kg)

Career information
- High school: Walker (Jasper)
- College: Butler CC (2016–2017), UAB (2018–2020)
- NFL draft: 2021: undrafted

Career history
- Minnesota Vikings (2021–2022); Michigan Panthers (2023)*; Birmingham Stallions (2023); Winnipeg Blue Bombers (2024–2025); Hamilton Tiger-Cats (2025–present)
- * Offseason or practice squad member only

Awards and highlights
- USFL champion (2023)

Career NFL statistics
- Games played: 1
- Stats at Pro Football Reference
- Stats at CFL.ca

Myron Mitchell (born June 17, 1998) is an American professional football wide receiver for the Hamilton Tiger-Cats of the Canadian Football League (CFL). He played college football at UAB and was signed by the Minnesota Vikings as an undrafted free agent in 2021.

== Early life ==
Mitchell was born on June 17, 1998, in Jasper, Alabama. He attended Walker High School there, compiling 67 catches for 1,090 yards and 11 touchdowns as a senior.

== College career ==
After graduating from high school, Mitchell accepted a scholarship offer from Butler Community College. He played with Butler from 2016 to 2017, his freshman and sophomore seasons, appearing in 19 games. He totaled 17 catches for 287 yards and one touchdown during his freshman season, and 25 receptions for 233 yards and one touchdown as a sophomore.

Mitchell transferred to University of Alabama at Birmingham in 2018, spending his junior year as a redshirt. As a redshirt-junior in 2019, he appeared in all 14 games and compiled 34 catches for 554 yards and four touchdowns. He also scored a kick return touchdown in the season opener against Alabama State. At the end of the season, he was named honorable mention all-conference at both the wide receiver and kick returner positions. Mitchell made 29 catches for 436 yards and three touchdowns as a senior and was named honorable mention all-conference for the second year.

== Professional career ==
Pre-draft measurables
Height	Weight	Arm length	Hand span	Wingspan	Vertical jump	Broad jump	Bench press
5 ft 11 7/8 in (1.83 m)	189 lb (86 kg)	32 1/8 in (0.82 m)	9 5/8 in (0.24 m)	6 ft 4 1/8 in (1.93 m)	34.0 in (0.86 m)	10 ft 4 in (3.15 m)	7 reps
All values from Pro Day

=== Minnesota Vikings ===
After going unselected in the 2021 NFL draft, Mitchell was signed by the Minnesota Vikings as an undrafted free agent. He was released on August 31 but re-signed to the practice squad the next day. He was activated from the practice squad on December 20. He made his NFL debut in week 15 versus the Chicago Bears, appearing on one offensive snap in the 17–9 win. He signed a reserve/future contract with the Vikings on January 10, 2022.

On August 29, 2022, Mitchell was released by the Vikings.

=== Birmingham Stallions ===
Mitchell signed with the Michigan Panthers of the USFL on December 13, 2022, but had his playing rights traded to the Birmingham Stallions three days later. He was placed on injured reserve on June 21, 2023. On January 15, 2024, Mitchell was selected by the Stallions in the 11th round of the Super Draft portion of the 2024 UFL dispersal draft. He was waived on March 22, 2024.

=== Winnipeg Blue Bombers ===
On April 17, 2024, Mitchell signed with the Winnipeg Blue Bombers. Following training camp in 2024, he made the team's active roster as a backup receiver. He made his professional debut on June 6, 2024, against the Montreal Alouettes, where he had four kickoff returns for 71 yards. He played in four regular season games where he had 11 punt returns for 62 yards and eight kickoff returns for 144 yards. He attended training camp with the team in 2025, but was part of the final cuts and was released on June 1, 2025.

=== Hamilton Tiger-Cats ===
On September 9, 2025, Mitchell signed with the Hamilton Tiger-Cats. He finished the year on the practice roster but was re-signed on November 26, 2025.
