= Slick Lollar =

American football player (1905–1945)

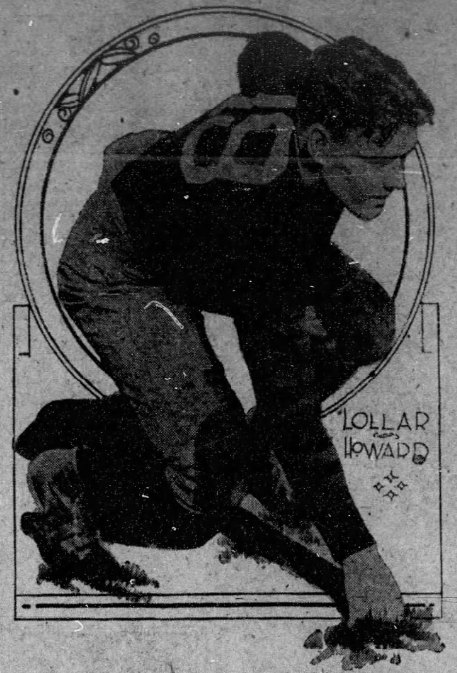
- Lollar, c. 1924

No. 14
- Position: Back

Personal information
- Born: October 4, 1905; Alabama, U.S.
- Died: May 7, 1945 (aged 39); Jamestown, North Dakota, U.S.
- Listed height: 5 ft 11 in (1.80 m)
- Listed weight: 200 lb (91 kg)

Career information
- High school: Walker (AL)
- College: Howard (1923–1926)

Career history

Playing
- Green Bay Packers (1928); Oshkosh Badgers (1929)

Coaching
- Howard (1927) Freshman coach

Career statistics
- Games played: 3
- Stats at Pro Football Reference

John Hope "Slick" Lollar (October 4, 1905 – May 7, 1945) was an American professional football player. A back, he played college football for the Howard Bulldogs and later for one season in the National Football League (NFL) with the Green Bay Packers. He also was briefly a coach at Howard and after his football career he worked as a salesman in Wisconsin.

== Early life ==
Lollar was born on October 4, 1905, in Alabama, and grew up in Jasper, Alabama. He attended Walker High School in Jasper where he played football and acted as team captain for a time. He played three seasons at Walker and was used as a quarterback and guard. After high school, he enrolled at Howard College (now Samford University) and joined their football team in 1923.

Lollar played as a fullback for Howard in 1923 before becoming an end in 1924, being described as a "stellar" player and "one of the best defensive men on the team." He was reported to have played "brilliantly" by The Birmingham News. He also started playing punter in 1925. The Birmingham News noted that in his first game at punter, "the 'Slicker' [came] through like [Doug] Wycoff," and that he also was moved to the backfield that game, and then "performed so well at cracking skulls coming through the line (blocking) that [coach] Gillem is going to keep him in the backfield." He was also described as being "a ton of brick" but "as slick as an eel." He played his final season at Howard in 1926. In addition to football, Lollar also played at least two years for the baseball team and was elected president of his senior class at Howard.

After Lollar graduated from Howard, he accepted a position as the coach of the school's freshman sports teams in 1927. In 1927, prior to coaching Howard's freshman football team (the "Bullpups"), he attended a coaching school run by Knute Rockne to learn plays to use for his team. The team was reported to have initially been "mediocre" but turned their season into a "successful one" by defeating the freshman team of Birmingham–Southern. In August 1928, he briefly served as a football coach for a boys camp.

== Professional career ==
In July 1928, Lollar signed to play professional football for the Green Bay Packers of the National Football League (NFL). He was Howard's first NFL player. A report in the Green Bay Press-Gazette noted that he had received little publicity in college due to Howard's small size, but prominent sportswriter Walter Eckersall watched him play and declared he would have been an All-American if a member of a larger school. He made the team but was hospitalized for a week after suffering a knee injury in the season opener against the Frankford Yellow Jackets. He later returned and appeared in two further games for the Packers, neither as a starter, as the team compiled a record of 6–4–3, fourth in the NFL. He did not return to the Packers in 1929, but continued to play as a member of the Oshkosh Badgers.

== Later life and death ==
After his brief professional career, Lollar remained in Wisconsin and worked as a salesman in Marinette. He died on May 7, 1945, in Jamestown, North Dakota, at the age of 39. He was buried in his hometown of Jasper.
