= Stephen Beech Cleveland House =

Historic house in Alabama, United States

- U.S. National Register of Historic Places
- Alabama Register of Landmarks and Heritage
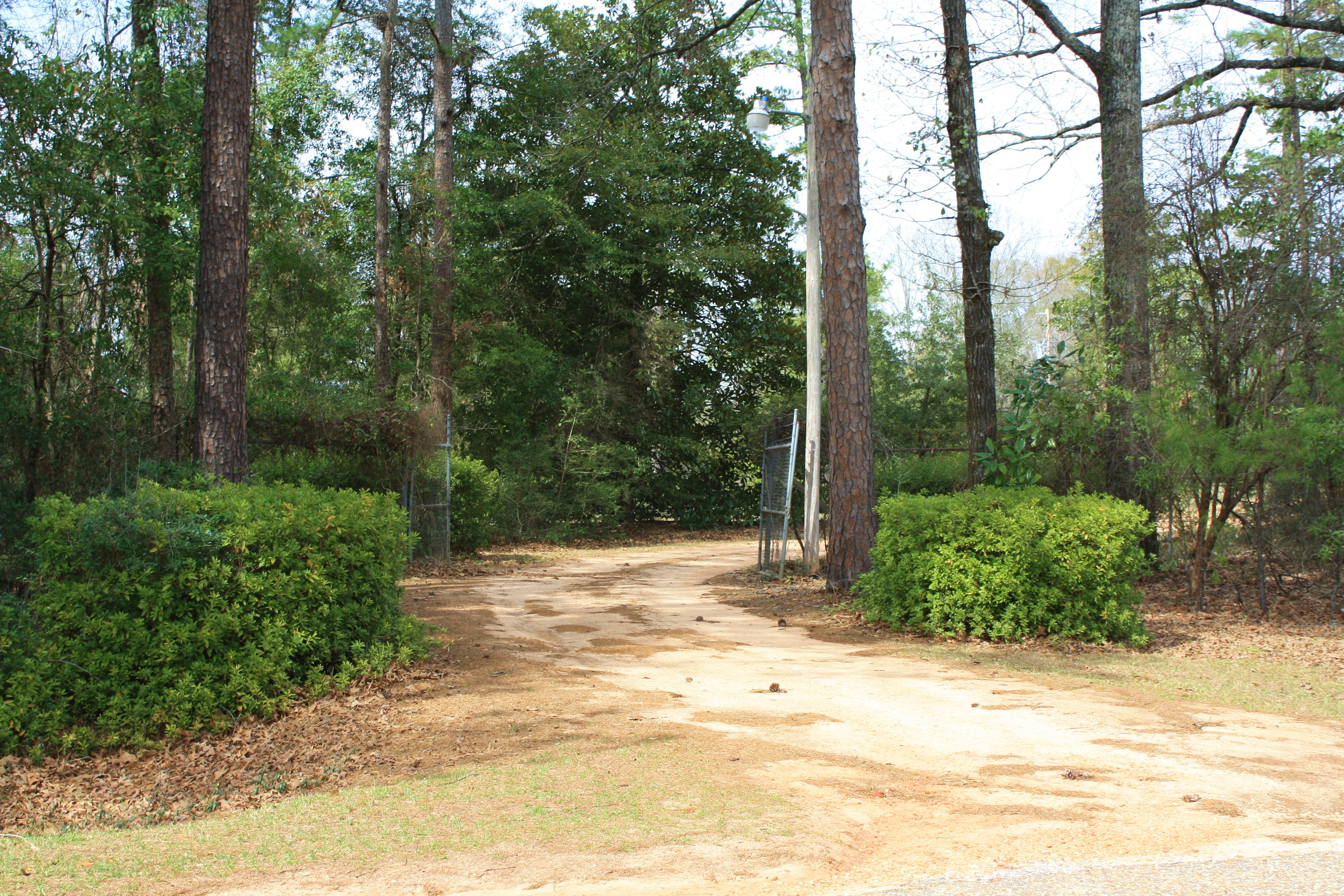
- The entrance in 2011

- Location within Alabama Location within the United States
- Nearest city: Suggsville, Alabama
- Coordinates: 31°36′36″N 87°41′16″W
- Area: 7 acres (2.8 ha)
- Built: 1860
- Architectural style: Mid 19th Century Revival
- MPS: Clarke County MPS
- NRHP reference No.: 99000886

Significant dates
- Added to NRHP: July 28, 1999
- Designated ARLH: June 9, 1977

The Stephen Beech Cleveland House, also known as The Lodge, is a historic house in Suggsville, Alabama, United States. The one-story wood-frame house was completed in 1860 by Stephen Beech Cleveland. Upon completion of the home, Beech lived in it with his wife, two young children and his younger brother, according to census data. The house has a mid 19th century revival architectural style, with a limestone foundation and asphalt roof, as noted in the National Register of Historic Places. It features a wrap-around porch on the front and one side. It was listed on the National Register of Historic Places on July 28, 1999, due to its architectural significance.
