= Charles Mackall =

American football player and golfer (1903–1991)

- Mackall c. 1926

Profile
- Position: Guard

Personal information
- Born: July 29, 1903; Washington, D. C., U.S.
- Died: December 24, 1991 (aged 88); New York, U.S.
- Listed height: 6 ft 1 in (1.85 m)
- Listed weight: 205 lb (93 kg)

Career information
- College: Virginia (1924–1926)

Awards and highlights
- All-Southern (1926)

Charles Matthews Mackall (July 29, 1903 – December 24, 1991) was a college football player and golfer.

== University of Virginia ==
He was a prominent guard for the Virginia Cavaliers of the University of Virginia On the 100th anniversary of Virginia football he said "I never would have thought Virginia football would get as big as it is today."

=== 1926 ===
Mackall was elected captain of its 1926 team. He led the Southern Conference in field goals in 1926 with four. Mackall was selected All-Southern.

== Golf ==
He won the Virginia state amateur golf championship in 1927.
