= Hoyt Winslett =

American football player and businessman (1904–1998)

Hoyt "Wu" Winslett

No. 58
- Position: End

Personal information
- Born: January 2, 1904; Horseshoe Bend, Alabama, U.S.
- Died: October 2, 1998 (aged 94); Tuscaloosa, Alabama, U.S.
- Listed weight: 172 lb (78 kg)

Career information
- College: Alabama (1924–1926)

Awards and highlights
- 2× National champion (1925, 1926); 3× SoCon champion (1924, 1925, 1926); First-team All-American (1926); All-Southern (1926)

Hoyt "Wu" Winslett (January 22, 1904 – October 2, 1998) was an American college football player and businessman. He was part of the University of Alabama Crimson Tide's first two national championship teams in 1925 and 1926. Winslett is also recognized as Alabama's first Associated Press All-American.

== University of Alabama ==
Winslett was a prominent football player for coach Wallace Wade's Alabama Crimson Tide football team at University of Alabama. He played for two years as a reserve back before being moved to end in 1926, where he excelled. He could also pass, connecting many times with Herschel Caldwell for gains. He was a member of both the 1925 and 1926 squads which won both the Southern Conference and the national championships. He also was part of the 1924 squad that won the Southern Conference championship. For his performance during the 1926 season, Winslett was named to the All-America Team First Team by the Associated Press. His selection was the first by the Associated Press for a player from the Southern United States to the All-America Team First Team.

He was inducted into the Alabama Sports Hall of Fame in the Class of 1973 for football. In 1992, Winslett was named the Paul W. Bryant Alumni-Athlete Awards in recognition of his service within the community since the end of this playing career.

== Post-football career ==
After he graduated from Alabama in 1926, Winslett stayed in Tuscaloosa where he served as a branch manager for the West Alabama Branch of Protective Life. He worked at Protective Life though his retirement in 1969. Winslett also served as the state president of the National Exchange Club, as director of the Tuscaloosa Chamber of Commerce and as chairman of the Tuscaloosa Chapter of the Red Cross. In 1995, he endowed $120,000 to establish The Wu and Louise Winslett Endowed Scholarship Fund. The scholarship is for entering freshmen from Dadeville High School, where Winslett and his wife attended in the 1920s.

== Personal life ==
Winslett was married to Louise Winslett though her death in 1981. His nickname "Wu" was given to him by his Alabama teammates in the 1920s due to his resemblance to the movie character Mr. Wu.
