= Jasper City Schools =

School district in Alabama

Jasper City School District is a school district in Walker County, Alabama. It has five schools including Jasper High School, Jasper Junior High, Maddox Intermediate, T.R. Simmons Elementary, and Memorial Park Elementary.
