= Curtis Luckey =

American football player (1904–1983)

Profile
- Position: Tackle

Personal information
- Born: July 31, 1904; Georgia, US
- Died: June 21, 1983 (aged 78); Augusta, Georgia, US

Career information
- College: Georgia (1924–1926)

Awards and highlights
- All-Southern (1926)

Judge Curtis Luckey (July 31, 1904 – June 21, 1983) was an All-Southern college football tackle for the Georgia Bulldogs of the University of Georgia, known in his time as one of the best linemen in the South. He was selected on a second-team All-Time Georgia Bulldogs football team posted in 1935.
