= Suggsville, Alabama =

Unincorporated community in Alabama, United States

- Unincorporated community
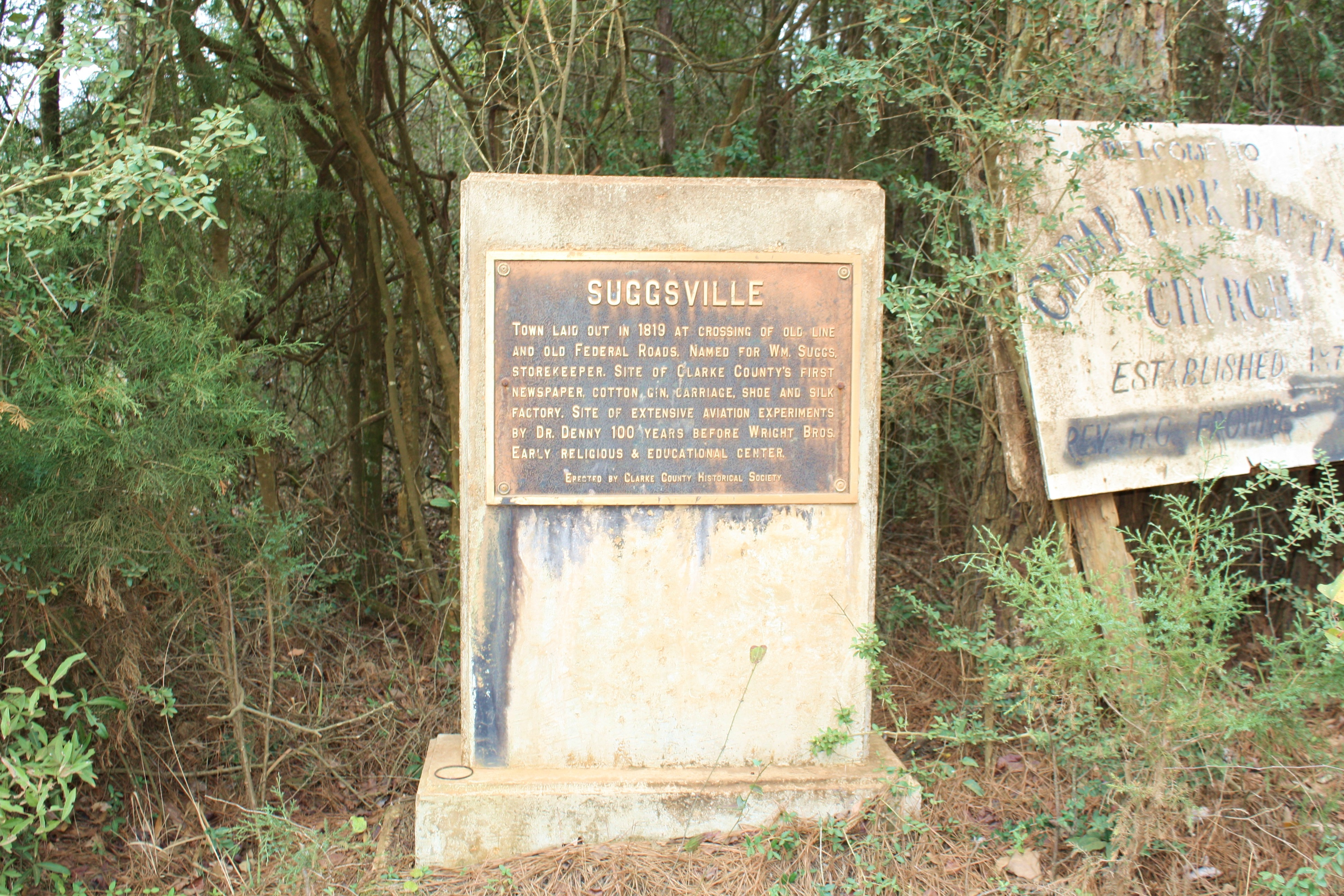
- Historical marker at the site

- Location within the state of Alabama Suggsville, Alabama (the United States)
- Coordinates: 31.58960°N 87.69305°W
- Country: United States
- State: Alabama
- County: Clarke
- Elevation: 381 ft (116 m)
- Time zone: UTC-6 (Central (CST))
  - Summer (DST): UTC-5 (CDT)
- Area code: 251

Suggsville is an unincorporated community in Clarke County, Alabama.

== History ==
Suggsville was laid out as a town in 1819 at the crossing of the Old Line Road and Federal Road. The name was chosen in honor of a local storekeeper, William Suggs. The first newspaper in Clarke County was published here, the Clarke County Post. The town had many residences, stores, and male and female academies prior to the American Civil War, but declined rapidly in the post-war period.

The community is located near the site of the Creek War stockades Fort Glass and Fort Madison.

The community has one site on the National Register of Historic Places, the Stephen Beech Cleveland House, better known today as "The Lodge".

== Demographics ==
Historical population
| Census | Pop. | Note | %± |
|---|---|---|---|
| 1880 | 134 | | — |
U.S. Decennial Census

As of the 1880 U.S. Census, Suggsville as an unincorporated community had 134 persons, then the 3rd largest recorded community in the county behind Grove Hill and Choctaw Corner, today's Thomasville.

== Geography ==
Suggsville is located at 31.58960°N 87.69305°W and has an elevation of 381 feet (116 m).

== Notable people ==
- Red Barnes, former Major League Baseball player, cousin of Sam Barnes
- Sam Barnes, former Major League Baseball player
- Charles Rudolph d'Olive, World War I flying ace credited with five aerial victories. Born in Suggsville.
