= Red Barnes =

American baseball player (1904–1959)

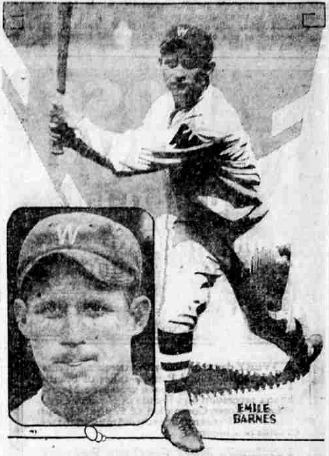
- Outfielder
- Born: December 25, 1903; Suggsville, Alabama, U.S.
- Died: July 3, 1959 (aged 55); Mobile, Alabama, U.S.
- Batted: Left Threw: Right

MLB debut
- September 29, 1927, for the Washington Senators

Last MLB appearance
- September 20, 1930, for the Chicago White Sox

MLB statistics
- Batting average: .269
- Home runs: 8
- Runs batted in: 97
- Stats at Baseball Reference

Teams
- Washington Senators (1927–1930); Chicago White Sox (1930)

Red Barnes
- Barnes depicted c. 1926

Profile
- Position: Halfback/Quarterback

Personal information
- Born: December 25, 1904; Suggsville, Alabama, U.S.
- Died: July 3, 1959 (aged 54); Mobile, Alabama, U.S.
- Listed weight: 172 lb (78 kg)

Career information
- College: Alabama (1925–1926)

Awards and highlights
- 2× National champion (1925, 1926); All-Southern (1926)

Emile Deering Barnes (December 25, 1903 – July 3, 1959) was an American outfielder in Major League Baseball who played from 1927 through 1930 for the Washington Senators and Chicago White Sox. Listed at 5' 10", 158 lb., Barnes batted left handed and threw right handed. He was born in Suggsville, Alabama. His cousin, Sam Barnes, also played in the majors.

Barnes posted a .269 batting average in 286 career games. In between, he played in the Minor Leagues in all or parts of 14 seasons spanning 1927–1994, hitting .269 with 100 home runs in 1,413 games.

Besides, Barnes was a quarterback for Wallace Wade's Alabama Crimson Tide football teams, starting in the 1927 Rose Bowl.

Barnes died in 1959 in Mobile, Alabama, at the age of 55.
