= Orin Helvey =

American football player and reverend (1903–1969)

No. 2
- Position: Guard/Fullback

Personal information
- Born: November 6, 1903; Wynnewood, Oklahoma, U.S.
- Died: March 3, 1969 (aged 65); Richmond, Texas, U.S.
- Listed weight: 210 lb (95 kg)

Career information
- College: Sewanee (1923–1926)

Awards and highlights
- All-Southern (1926); Porter Cup (1927)

Orin Greenhill "Mount" Helvey (November 6, 1903 – March 3, 1969) was a college football player and reverend.

== Sewanee ==

"Mount" Helvey was a prominent guard and fullback for the Sewanee Tigers football teams from 1923 to 1926. Helvey also played basketball and ran track.

=== 1926 ===
He was selected All-Southern in 1926. That year, he "attracted considerable attention for his fine defensive play during the season". Arguably the finest example was holding champion Alabama to a 2–0 score largely by his efforts. Helvey was awarded the Porter Cup as Sewanee's best all-around athlete in 1927.
