= Harry P. Gamble =

Harry P. Gamble, Jr.
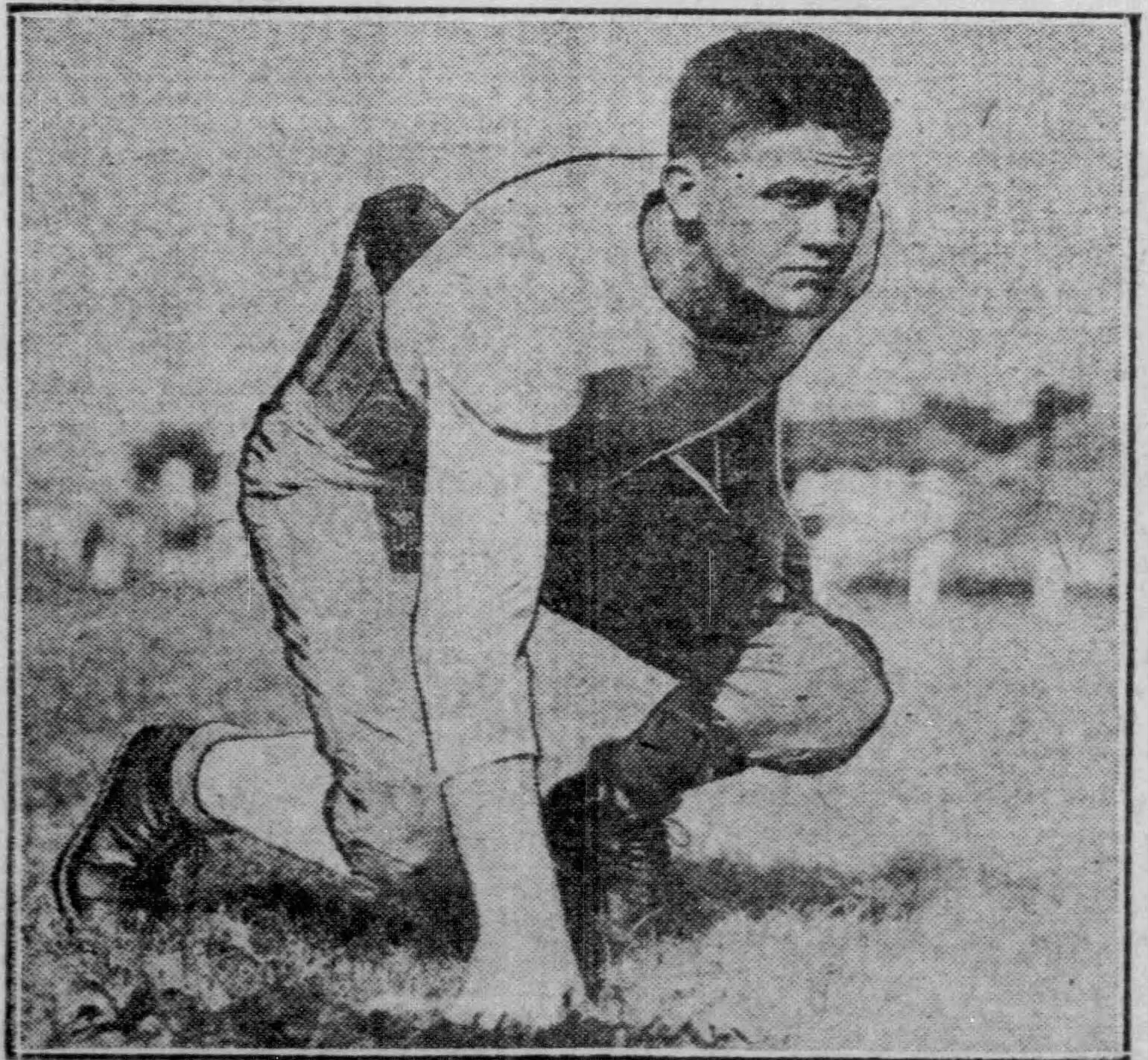

No. 7, 26, 77
- Position: End

Personal information
- Born: March 22, 1904; New Orleans, Louisiana
- Died: April 9, 1995 (aged 91); New Orleans, Louisiana
- Listed weight: 165 lb (75 kg)

Career information
- High school: Warren Easton
- College: Tulane University (1922–1926)

Awards and highlights
- SoCon championship (1925); All-Southern (1926); Tulane Athletics Hall of Fame; Greater New Orleans Sports Hall of Fame

Harry Pollard "Hubby" Gamble Jr. (March 22, 1904 – April 9, 1995) was a college football player, boxer, and attorney. He also participated in swimming and gymnastics. He then coached all these sports at his high school. Gamble was inducted into the Tulane University Athletics Hall of Fame in 1980 and the Greater New Orleans Sports Hall of Fame in 1983.

== Early life ==
Harry Pollard Gamble, Jr. was born on March 22, 1904, in New Orleans, Louisiana, the third child of Harry Pollard Gamble, Sr. and Dorothy Edna Brian.

His father Harry Senior was a politician. He played on LSU football teams in 1894–95 and served in the Spanish–American War. He was appointed assistant attorney general in the state of Louisiana under Ruffin G. Pleasant. Following the Supreme Court ruling on Brown v. Board of Education, Gamble Senior devoted himself to the cause of segregation and preservation of state's rights, founding the American Society for the Preservation of State Government and Racial Integrity in 1955. Gamble, Jr. described himself and his father as "segregationists up to the hilt." His son, Harry P. Gamble III, was a leader in the segregationist Citizens' Council of New Orleans.

== Tulane University ==
=== Football ===
Gamble was a prominent end for the Tulane Green Wave football team of Tulane University. He was once a law partner of former teammate and famed Tulane quarterback Lester Lautenschlaeger. Gamble was president of the Tulane Alumni Association from 1957 to 1958.

==== 1925 ====
When Tulane beat Northwestern in 1925, a year in which it was Southern Conference Co-Champion, Chicago sportswriters "agreed that it was the best blocking team displayed there in ages, and it was Harry Gamble who did the lion's share of cutting down the opponents." "That year, with his girl bride in the stands, he played like a demon. Not an inch was gained around him all season." Tulane Stadium was dedicated to the 1925 team.

==== 1926 ====
Gamble was captain and All-Southern in 1926, the first season of Tulane Stadium. He played across from Gordon "Doc" Wilson at end. Gamble was the only captain in major football to be married, eloping to marry a miss Gretchen Bush. Coach Clark Shaughnessy joked, "If I ever get a bad Tulane team I think I'll hold eleven weddings and make them champions." One description of his play reads "Not an inch was gained around his end last year by any Tulane enemy. And many a touchdown was scored around that end through Harry Gamble's magnificent interference." Gamble was also called "a wizard at picking forward passes out of the ether."

=== Boxing ===
Gamble coached boxing at Tulane for four years.

=== Swimming and gymnastics ===
He was also on the varsity swimming and gymnastics teams.

== High school coach ==
After college, Gamble coached football, gymnastics, swimming and diving at his alma mater, Warren Easton High School. He is listed among the great coaches in New Orleans high school football history. One source labels him "an expert gymnast" for coaching a seven time rope climbing champion.
