= Sam Barnes (baseball) =

American baseball player (1899–1981)

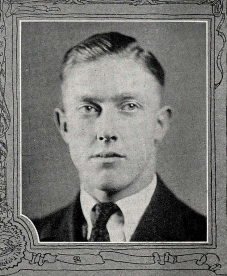
- Second baseman
- Born: December 18, 1899; Suggsville, Alabama, U.S.
- Died: February 19, 1981 (aged 81); Montgomery, Alabama, U.S.
- Batted: Left Threw: Right

MLB debut
- September 14, 1921, for the Detroit Tigers

Last MLB appearance
- October 2, 1921, for the Detroit Tigers

MLB statistics
- Batting average: .182
- Home runs: 0
- Runs batted in: 0
- Stats at Baseball Reference

Teams
- Detroit Tigers (1921)

Samuel Thomas Barnes (December 18, 1899 – February 19, 1981) was an American Major League Baseball (MLB) player. Barnes played for the Detroit Tigers in the 1921 season.

Barnes was born in Suggsville, Alabama and died in Montgomery, Alabama. He played collegiate baseball at Auburn University, where he was named team captain.

He was the cousin of former Major Leaguer, Red Barnes.
