= Myron Stevens (American football) =

American football halfback

Profile
- Position: Halfback

Career information
- College: Maryland (1925–1926)

Awards and highlights
- All-Southern (1926); Terp Hall of Fame

Myron B. Stevens was a college football player.

== Maryland ==
Stevens was a prominent halfback for the Maryland Terrapins of the University of Maryland, selected All-Southern in 1926. Maryland that year defeated Yale, "The Blue apparently underestimated the Southern eleven, which uncovered an all-around star in Myron Stevens." Stevens also played baseball and basketball. He was inducted into the Maryland Athletic Hall of Fame in 1990.

== See also ==
- 1926 College Football All-Southern Team
