= Johnny Marshall =

American football player and entrepreneur (1904–1977)

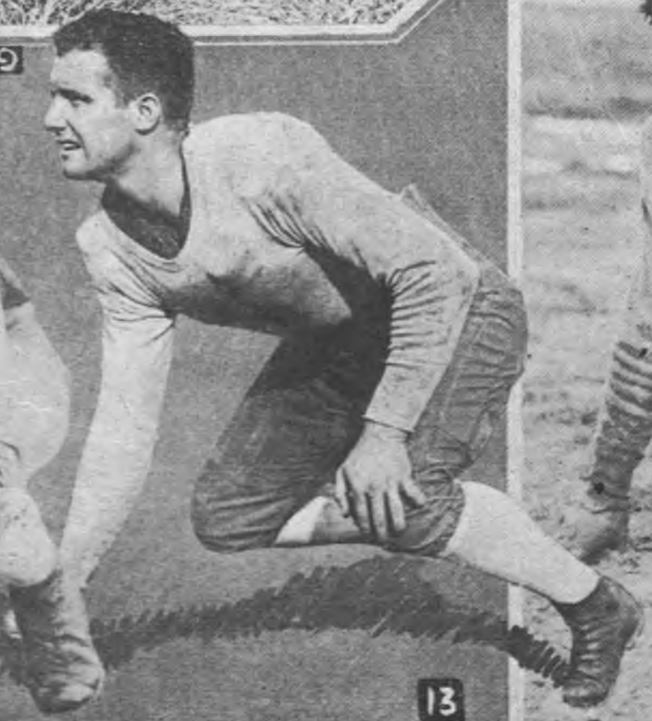
- Marshall in 1925

Profile
- Position: End

Personal information
- Born: June 18, 1904; Jacksonville, Florida, U.S.
- Died: November 7, 1977 (aged 73); Boston, Massachusetts, U.S.

Career information
- College: Georgia Tech (1925–1926)

Awards and highlights
- All-Southern (1926)

John Houston Marshall (June 18, 1904 – November 7, 1977) was a college football player and entrepreneur, with various business interests, including trucking and insurance.

== Georgia Tech ==
Johnny Marshall was a prominent end for William Alexander's Georgia Tech Yellow Jackets football teams. He was selected All-Southern in 1926. The yearbook in 1925 remarked '"Johnnie" could have made "All-American" had he caught that pass in the Alabama game."

== Personal life ==
Marshall was from Jacksonville, where he returned after graduation from Georgia Tech, founding the John Marshall Agency Inc.

He married Catherine M. Beckham. She was the daughter of Charlotte W. Mahone, the first woman to serve as dean of students at Florida State College for Women; and Brigadier General Robert H. Beckham, a former Adjutant General of Texas who served in the Spanish American War.

His only child, Carlotta Marshall, worked as a photographer in New York where she formed a close friendship with Diane Arbus. (Note: As revealed through published letters between them.)

== See also ==
- 1926 College Football All-Southern Team
