= Claude Perry =

American football player (1901–1975)

No. 26, 31, 27, 24, 37, 50, 32
- Position: Tackle

Personal information
- Born: October 31, 1901; Goodsprings, Alabama, U.S.
- Died: July 17, 1975 (aged 73); Goodsprings, Alabama, U.S.
- Listed height: 6 ft 1 in (1.85 m)
- Listed weight: 210 lb (95 kg)

Career information
- High school: Walker (Jasper, Alabama)
- College: Alabama

Career history
- 1925–1926: Alabama Crimson Tide
- 1927–1935: Green Bay Packers

Awards and highlights
- 3× NFL champion (1929, 1930, 1931); 2× National champion (1925, 1926); All-Southern (1926)
- Stats at Pro Football Reference

Claude "Cupe" Perry (October 31, 1901 – July 17, 1975) was an American professional football player who played offensive tackle for nine seasons for the Green Bay Packers. He was born in Goodsprings, Alabama. Perry played collegiate football for Wallace Wade's Alabama Crimson Tide football teams of the University of Alabama. In 1926 his team was a national champion and "Cupe" Perry was selected All-Southern.
