= 1925 Alabama Crimson Tide football team =

American college football season

1925 Alabama Crimson Tide football
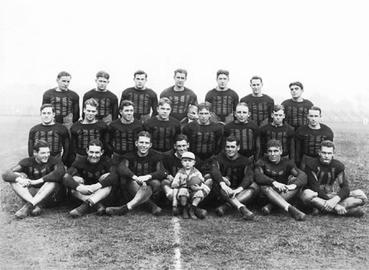

National champion (multiple selectors) SoCon co-champion Rose Bowl champion

Rose Bowl, W 20–19 vs. Washington
- Conference: Southern Conference
- Record: 10–0 (7–0 SoCon)
- Head coach: Wallace Wade (3rd season)
- Offensive scheme: Single-wing
- Captain: Bruce Jones
- Home stadium: Denny Field; Rickwood Field; Cramton Bowl

Uniform
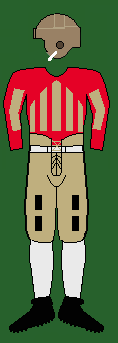

1925 Southern Conference football standings
	Conf.					Overall
Team	W		L		T	W		L		T
No. 2 Alabama +	7	–	0	–	0	10	–	0	–	0
No. 6 Tulane +	5	–	0	–	0	9	–	0	–	1
North Carolina	4	–	0	–	1	7	–	1	–	1
Washington and Lee	5	–	1	–	0	5	–	5	–	0
Virginia	4	–	1	–	1	7	–	1	–	1
Georgia Tech	4	–	1	–	1	6	–	2	–	1
Kentucky	4	–	2	–	0	6	–	3	–	0
Florida	3	–	2	–	0	8	–	2	–	0
Auburn	3	–	2	–	1	5	–	3	–	1
VPI	3	–	3	–	1	5	–	3	–	2
Vanderbilt	3	–	3	–	0	6	–	3	–	0
Tennessee	2	–	2	–	1	5	–	2	–	1
South Carolina	2	–	2	–	0	7	–	3	–	0
Georgia	2	–	4	–	0	4	–	5	–	0
Sewanee	1	–	4	–	0	4	–	4	–	1
Mississippi A&M	1	–	4	–	0	3	–	4	–	1
VMI	1	–	5	–	0	5	–	5	–	0
LSU	0	–	2	–	1	5	–	3	–	1
NC State	0	–	4	–	1	3	–	5	–	1
Ole Miss	0	–	4	–	0	5	–	5	–	0
Clemson	0	–	4	–	0	1	–	7	–	0
Maryland	0	–	4	–	0	2	–	5	–	1
+ – Conference co-champions; Rankings from Dickinson System

The 1925 Alabama Crimson Tide football team (variously "Alabama", "UA" or "Bama") represented the University of Alabama in the 1925 Southern Conference football season. It was the Crimson Tide's 32nd overall and 4th season as a member of the Southern Conference (SoCon). The team was led by head coach Wallace Wade, in his third year, and played their home games at Denny Field in Tuscaloosa, at Rickwood Field in Birmingham and at the Cramton Bowl in Montgomery, Alabama. They finished the season with their first ever perfect record (10–0 overall, 7–0 in the SoCon), as Southern Conference champions, defeated Washington in the Rose Bowl, and were retroactively named as national champion for 1925 by several major selectors.

The Crimson Tide entered the season as the defending Southern Conference champions after finishing the 1924 season with an 8–1 record. Alabama would then go on and shutout all but one of their regular season opponents en route to a second consecutive Southern Conference championship. The Crimson Tide then accepted an invitation to participate as the first Southern team in the annual Rose Bowl Game, where they defeated Washington 20–19. This victory has subsequently been recognized as one of the most important in Southern football history as well as has been deemed "the game that changed the South."

== Schedule ==
Date	Opponent	Site	Result	Attendance	Source
September 26	Union (TN)*	Denny Field; Tuscaloosa, AL	W 53–0		
October 2	Birmingham–Southern*	Denny Field; Tuscaloosa, AL	W 50–7		
October 10	at LSU	Tiger Stadium; Baton Rouge, LA (rivalry)	W 42–0	8,000	
October 17	Sewanee	Rickwood Field; Birmingham, AL	W 27–0		
October 24	at Georgia Tech	Grant Field; Atlanta, GA (rivalry)	W 7–0	20,000	
October 31	Mississippi A&M^{†}	Denny Field; Tuscaloosa, AL (rivalry)	W 6–0	7,000	
November 7	Kentucky	Rickwood Field; Birmingham, AL	W 31–0		
November 14	Florida	Cramton Bowl; Montgomery, AL (rivalry)	W 34–0		
November 26	Georgia	Rickwood Field; Birmingham, AL (rivalry)	W 27–0		
January 1, 1926	vs. Washington*	Rose Bowl; Pasadena, CA (Rose Bowl)	W 20–19	55,000	
*Non-conference game; ^{†}Homecoming

== Before the season ==
Alabama was last year upset by Centre. Former center and alumnus Shorty Propst was hired to the coaching staff.

1925 saw the south's widespread use of the forward pass.

== Game summaries ==
=== Union (TN) ===
Week 1: Union at Alabama

Team	1	2	3	4	Total
Union	0	0	0	0	0
• Alabama	13	27	7	6	53

- Date: September 26
- Location: Denny Field
  Tuscaloosa, AL
- Referee: Charles Kittleman

Alabama opened their 1925 season against Union University at Denny Field, and defeated the Bulldogs 53–0 in rainy field conditions. The Crimson Tide played every player on their squad in this game and touchdowns were scored twice each by Herschel Caldwell and David Rosenfeld; and were scored once each by Johnny Mack Brown, Hoyt Winslett, Waile and James Johnson. The margin of victory was not unexpected with The Augusta Chronicle stating:

"Union's squad is nothing more than a first class prep school and the Crimson Tide has no right to boast of their score and win."

The starting lineup was Melvin Vines (left end), Pickhard (left tackle), Buckler (left guard), Jones (center), Perry (right guard), Camp (right tackle), Hudson (right end), Barnes (quarterback), M. Brown (left halfback), Caldwell (right halfback), Hubert (fullback).

=== Birmingham–Southern ===
Week 2: Birmingham–Southern at Alabama

Team	1	2	3	4	Total
Birmingham–Southern	0	0	7	0	7
• Alabama	25	12	13	0	50

- Date: September 26
- Location: Denny Field
  Tuscaloosa, AL

Only one team scored on the Tide all regular season — Birmingham–Southern managed a touchdown after recovering a Grant Gillis fumble at the Alabama 25-yard line. Aided by two offside penalties, the Panthers drove the ball into the endzone. The Tide won 50–7. Hubert and Winslett scored two touchdowns each; and Rosenfeld, Gillis, Johnson and Barnes one each. The last period went scoreless.

=== LSU ===
Week 3: Alabama at LSU

Team	1	2	3	4	Total
• Alabama	7	14	14	7	42
LSU	0	0	0	0	0

- Date: October 10
- Location: Tiger Stadium
  Baton Rouge, LA
- Game attendance: 8,000
- Referee: Finley

In a game described by some as "perfection itself," Alabama defeated the LSU Tigers at Baton Rouge 42–0 in what was both their first road and conference game of the season. The Crimson Tide scored their first of six touchdowns on the opening drive of the game after Pooley Hubert scored on a three-yard run over center. In the second quarter, Hubert scored again on a one-yard run and David Rosenfeld scored on a five-yard run as time expired in the first half that gave Alabama a 21–0 halftime lead.

Alabama received the second half kickoff and drove 65 yards for their fourth touchdown scored by Grant Gillis on a one-yard run. Hubert then scored his third touchdown of the game on a short run that gave the Crimson Tide a 35–0 lead as they entered the fourth quarter. In the fourth quarter, Hubert scored his fourth touchdown on another short run that made the final score 42–0.

The starting lineup was Hudson (left end), Camp (left tackle), Buckler (left guard), Holmes (center), Jones (right guard), Perry (right tackle), Winslett (right end), Gillis (quarterback), Barnes (left halfback), M. Brown (right halfback), Hubert (fullback).

=== Sewanee ===
Week 4: Sewanee at Alabama

Team	1	2	3	4	Total
Sewanee	0	0	0	0	0
• Alabama	6	7	0	14	27

- Date: October 17
- Location: Rickwood Field
  Birmingham, AL
- Referee: Springer

1925 saw the South's widespread use of the forward pass, and Alabama brought it out to defeat the Sewanee Tigers 27–0 at Birmingham. In the first quarter, a 28-yard pass from Hoyt Winslett to Red Barnes set up the first touchdown score on a short Pooley Hubert run for a 6–0 lead. The Crimson Tide extended their lead to 13–0 at halftime behind Hubert's second touchdown of the game on a three-yard run.

After a scoreless third, Alabama scored their third touchdown on a 35-yard pass from Grant Gillis to Herschel Caldwell, and the last set up by a 35-yard pass from Hubert to Winslett. Hubert then scored the final points of the game late in the fourth after he recovered a Caldwell fumble in the endzone for a touchdown and the 27–0 victory.

The starting lineup was Hudson (left end), Perry (left tackle), Buckler (left guard), Holmes (center), Jones (right guard), Camp (right tackle), Winslett (right end), Gillis (quarterback), M. Brown (left halfback), Caldwell (right halfback), Hubert (fullback).

=== Georgia Tech ===
Week 5: Alabama at Georgia Tech

Team	1	2	3	4	Total
• Alabama	0	0	7	0	7
Georgia Tech	0	0	0	0	0

- Date: October 24
- Location: Grant Field
  Atlanta, GA
- Game attendance: 20,000
- Referee: Burch

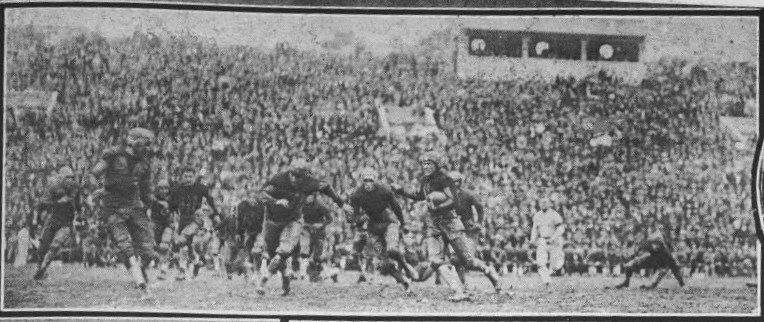
A scene from the Georgia Tech game at Grant Field

On a wet field, Alabama defeated coach William Alexander's Georgia Tech Golden Tornado 7–0 at Atlanta. After a scoreless first half, Johnny Mack Brown scored the only points of the game when he returned a Doug Wycoff punt 45-yards for a touchdown. "Hubert played the greatest game of his career and was called the greatest defensive back ever to appear on Grant Field".

The starting lineup was Winslett (left end), Perry (left tackle), Buckler (left guard), Holmes (center), Jones (right guard), Camp (right tackle), Hudson (right end), M. Brown (quarterback), Barnes (left halfback), Caldwell (right halfback), Hubert (fullback).

=== Mississippi A&M ===
Week 6: Mississippi A&M at Alabama

Team	1	2	3	4	Total
Mississippi A&M	0	0	0	0	0
• Alabama	0	6	0	0	6

- Date: October 31
- Location: Denny Field
  Tuscaloosa, AL
- Game attendance: 7,000
- Game weather: Rain
- Referee: Springer

On homecoming, Alabama defeated the Mississippi A&M Aggies 6–0 on a rainy afternoon in Tuscaloosa. After a scoreless first quarter, the Crimson Tide scored the only points of the game in the second after a short punt set them up on the Aggies' 26 yard line. Six plays later, Pooley Hubert threw an eight-yard touchdown pass to Hoyt Winslett, and Alabama took a 6–0 lead that held for the remainder of the game. The closest A&M came to tying the game came in the third, but stalled after Herschel Caldwell had an interception that stopped an Aggies drive at the Alabama 16 yard line.

The starting lineup was Winslett (left end), Perry (left tackle), Bowdoin (left guard), Paine (center), Dismukes (right guard), Pickhard (right tackle), T. Brown (right end), Hubert (quarterback), Gillis (left halfback), Rosenfeld (right halfback), Johnson (fullback).

=== Kentucky ===
Week 7: Kentucky at Alabama

Team	1	2	3	4	Total
Kentucky	0	0	0	0	0
• Alabama	10	7	7	7	31

- Date: November 7
- Location: Rickwood Field
  Birmingham, AL
- Referee: Lambert (Ohio State)

At Rickwood Field, the Crimson Tide defeated the Kentucky Wildcats 31–0. After Bill Buckler kicked an eight-yard field goal, Johnny Mack Brown ran a 79-yard touchdown "on a sweeping flank play" for a 10–0 Alabama lead at the end of the first quarter. Red Barnes extended their lead to 17–0 at halftime after he returned a John Ross fumble 77-yards for a touchdown.

Brown scored again in the third quarter on a 16-yard run off a "triple fake pass," and Pooley Hubert made the final score 31–0 with his short run in the fourth quarter.

The starting lineup was Winslett (left end), Perry (left tackle), Jones (left guard), Holmes (center), Buckler (right guard), Camp (right tackle), T. Brown (right end), Hubert (quarterback), Caldwell (left halfback), Barnes (right halfback), M. Brown (fullback).

=== Florida ===
Week 8: Florida at Alabama

Team	1	2	3	4	Total
Florida	0	0	0	0	0
• Alabama	7	6	7	14	34

- Date: November 14
- Location: Cramton Bowl
  Montgomery, AL
- Referee: Charles Kittleman

A large crowd was expected in Montgomery for the game against the Florida Gators. The return to the lineup of Tide center Gordon Holmes, injured against Georgia Tech, and the battle between backs Mack Brown and Edgar C. Jones brought intrigue. Mack Brown made two touchdowns; Red Barnes two, and Pooley Hubert one. Brown's first score came when he caught the ball on a pass from Hubert at the 15-yard line, dodged Jones and scored. A pass from Hubert to Brown in the end zone netted the second score. Florida's Scott returned the kickoff to Alabama's 20-yard line, nearly breaking the tackle there. Two Barnes interceptions set up his touchdowns, one a 16-yard run after catch and another an end run. Jones attempted a drop kick, which was short and returned by Brown for 35 yards. A drive and a pass to Barnes got Alabama to Florida's 3-yard line, and Hubert scored over center.

The starting lineup was Winslett (left end), Perry (left tackle), Jones (left guard), Holmes (center), Buckler (right guard), Camp (right tackle), T. Brown (right end), Hubert (quarterback), M. Brown (left halfback), Barnes (right halfback), Caldwell (fullback).

=== Georgia ===
Week 9: Georgia at Alabama

Team	1	2	3	4	Total
Georgia	0	0	0	0	0
• Alabama	7	7	6	7	27

- Date: November 26
- Location: Rickwood Field
  Birmingham, AL
- Referee: Charles Kittleman

In their final regular season game, Alabama defeated the Georgia Bulldogs 27–0 and clinched their second consecutive Southern Conference championship. The Crimson Tide took a 7–0 lead in the first quarter after Pooley Hubert reversed the ball to Hoyt Winslett, who then passed it 25 yards to Grant Gillis, who then ran for 25 more and the score. Hubert then scored the final three touchdowns for Alabama. Hubert scored next after a fumble in the second. In the third period, Gillis made 22 yards on a triple pass to set up a short Hubert touchdown run. The last touchdown was set up by a Hubert pass to Ben A. Hudson that was followed by a short Hubert run for a 27–0 victory.

This victory in conjunction with the tie game between Colgate and Brown all but assured the Crimson Tide's selection to the Rose Bowl.

The starting lineup was Winslett (left end), Camp (left tackle), Jones (left guard), Holmes (center), Buckler (right guard), Perry (right tackle), T. Brown (right end), Hubert (quarterback), M. Brown (left halfback), Barnes (right halfback), Gillis (fullback).

== Postseason ==
=== Washington ===
Rose Bowl

Team	1	2	3	4	Total
• Alabama	0	0	20	0	20
Washington	6	6	0	7	19

- Date: January 1
- Location: Rose Bowl
  Pasadena, CA
- Game attendance: 55,000

The season was extended when Alabama received a surprise invitation to head west and play in the Rose Bowl. It was Alabama's first bowl game ever and the first time a southern team had ever been invited to play in what then was college football's only bowl game. Its opponent was the Washington Huskies, who had gone 10–0–1, been just as dominant as the Tide, and were regarded as heavy favorites by the press.

Through one half, that prediction looked accurate. Washington's star halfback George Wilson intercepted a pass in the first quarter and then led his team 63 yards for a touchdown and a 6–0 lead. In the second quarter Wilson ran for 36 yards and then threw a 22-yard touchdown pass, and Washington went up 12–0. Both extra point tries failed. At the half, Wade changed his game plan, telling Pooley Hubert to run more often. Possibly more importantly, George Wilson sat out the entire third quarter due to sore ribs. It was in that third quarter that Alabama struck. A short punt set up Alabama on the Washington 42 and the Tide quickly capitalized, Hubert scoring on a 1-yard run to make the score 12–7. The Huskies couldn't move the ball without Wilson and punted. Shortly thereafter Grant Gillis hit Brown on a 59-yard touchdown pass and suddenly Alabama led 14–12. Not long after that Washington fumbled the ball and Alabama recovered at the Husky 30. Hubert found Brown for another touchdown pass on the very next play. The extra point failed, but Alabama still led 20–12. Bama scored three touchdowns in seven minutes of clock time. Wilson returned in the fourth quarter and threw a late touchdown pass, but the two missed extra points in the first half proved decisive, and Alabama won 20–19.

The starting lineup was Winslett (left end), Perry (left tackle), Buckler (left guard), Holmes (center), Jones (right guard), Camp (right tackle), T. Brown (right end), Gillis (quarterback), M. Brown (left halfback), Barnes (right halfback), Hubert (fullback).

=== Awards and honors ===
It was Alabama's first real perfect season in school history, though Alabama was undefeated in 1897 when the Tide played and won one game. The team was ranked No. 2 in the nation in the Dickinson System ratings released in December 1925. Other major selectors retroactively named Alabama as "national champion" for 1925. Johnny Mack Brown and Pooley Hubert were later inducted into the College Football Hall of Fame. Brown capitalized on his Rose Bowl exposure in southern California by signing a motion picture contract with MGM and beginning a 40-year career in the movies.

== Personnel ==
=== Varsity letter winners ===
==== Line ====
Number	Player	Hometown	Position	Games started	Prep school	Height	Weight	Age
	Bill Buckler	Saint Paul, Minnesota	Guard	8				
	Joseph "Pete" Camp	Manchester, Alabama	Tackle	8				
	Ben E. Compton	Greensboro, Alabama	Guard					
	Gordon Holmes	Springville, Alabama	Center	6				
	Ben A. Hudson	Montgomery, Alabama	End	4				
	Bruce Jones	Jasper, Alabama	Guard	6				
	Leslie Payne	Bay Minette, Alabama	Tackle					
	Claude Perry	Jasper, Alabama	Tackle	8				
	Hulet Whitaker	Guntersville, Alabama	End					
58	Hoyt "Wu" Winslett	Dadeville, Alabama	End	8			172	21

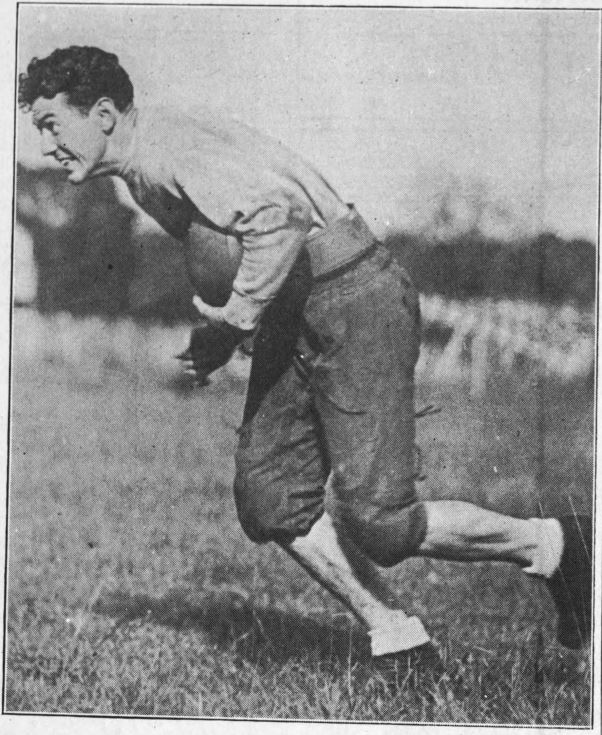
Johnny Mack Brown in 1925

==== Backfield ====
Number	Player	Hometown	Position	Games started	Prep school	Height	Weight	Age
	Red Barnes	Grove Hill, Alabama	Halfback	7			172	20
17	Johnny Mack Brown	Dothan, Alabama	Halfback	8	Dothan High	5'11"	160	21
	Herschel Caldwell	Blytheville, Arkansas	Halfback	5				22
	Grant Gillis	Grove Hill, Alabama	Quarterback	5		5'10"	165	24
	Robert Lee Hamner	Fayette, Alabama	Back					
10	Allison "Pooley" Hubert	Meridian, Mississippi	Fullback	9	Meridian High	5'10"	190	24
	James Johnson	Tuscaloosa, Alabama	Halfback	1				
	W. S. Oliver	Panola, Alabama	Back/Tackle					
	David Rosenfeld	Birmingham, Alabama	Halfback	1				

==== Other ====
Name	Hometown	Position
Ed Bruce	Birmingham	Manager

==== Coaching staff ====
Name	Position	Seasons at Alabama	Alma mater
Wallace Wade	Head coach	3	Brown (1917)
Hank Crisp	Assistant coach	5	VPI (1920)
Russell Cohen	Assistant coach	3	Vanderbilt (1916)
Clyde "Shorty" Propst	Assistant coach	1	Alabama (1924)
William T. Van de Graaff	Assistant coach	5	Alabama (1916)
