= Gordon Holmes (American football) =

American football player

Profile
- Position: Center

Personal information
- Born: c. 1905; Springville, Alabama, U.S.
- Died: August 8, 1963 (aged 57–58); Fairfield, Alabama, U.S.

Career information
- College: Alabama (1924–1926)

Awards and highlights
- 2× National champion (1925, 1926); 3× SoCon championship (1924, 1925, 1926); All-Southern (1926)

Gordon Forrest "Sherlock" Holmes (c. 1905 – August 8, 1963) was a college football player.

== College football ==
Holmes was an All-Southern center for Wallace Wade's Alabama Crimson Tide football teams of the University of Alabama, a member of the first Southern team to win a Rose Bowl. He got a case of appendicitis en route to the second one while in El Paso, and was left there with the idea of Babe Pearce filling in for Holmes. Holmes let his doctors know he would catch the next train to Pasadena. The team's roster lists him as from Springville, Alabama.

He died on August 8, 1963.
