= John Brewer (American football, born 1906) =

American football player (1906–1980)

No. 17 – Dayton Triangles
- Positions: Guard, halfback

Personal information
- Born: April 6, 1906; Griffin, Georgia, U.S.
- Died: May 2, 1980 (aged 74); New Port Richey, Florida, U.S.
- Listed height: 6 ft 0 in (1.83 m)
- Listed weight: 185 lb (84 kg)

Career information
- High school: Griffin
- College: Georgia Tech

Career history
- Dayton Triangles (1929)
- Stats at Pro Football Reference

John Brewer (April 6, 1906 – May 2, 1980) was an American professional football player for the Dayton Triangles of the American Professional Football Association (APFA). He played college football for the Georgia Tech Yellow Jackets.

== See also ==
- List of Georgia Tech Yellow Jackets starting quarterbacks
