= Walt Godwin =

American football player (1898–1953)

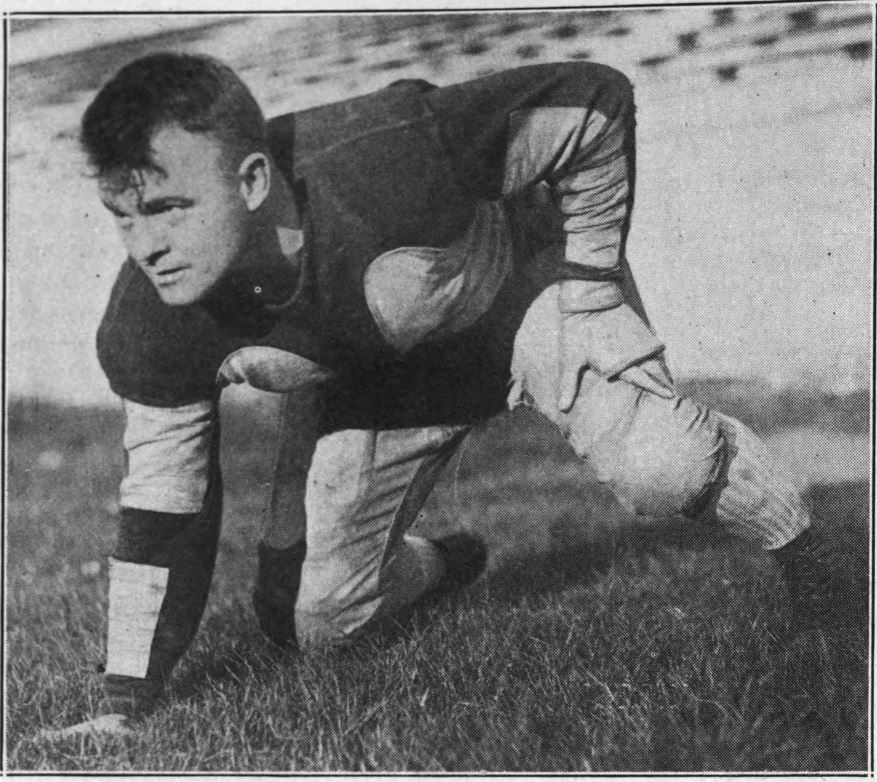
- Godwin as a member of Georgia Tech's team, 1925

Profile
- Position: Guard

Personal information
- Born: June 15, 1898
- Died: May 18, 1953 (aged 54)
- Listed height: 5 ft 7 in (1.70 m)
- Listed weight: 205 lb (93 kg)

Career information
- College: Georgia Tech

Career history
- Staten Island Stapletons (1929)

Awards and highlights
- Second-team All-American (1925)
- Stats at Pro Football Reference

Walter Hampton Godwin (June 15, 1898 – May 18, 1953) was an American football player in the National Football League. He played for the Staten Island Stapletons. He played collegiately for the Georgia Tech football team.
