= Owen Pool =

American football center

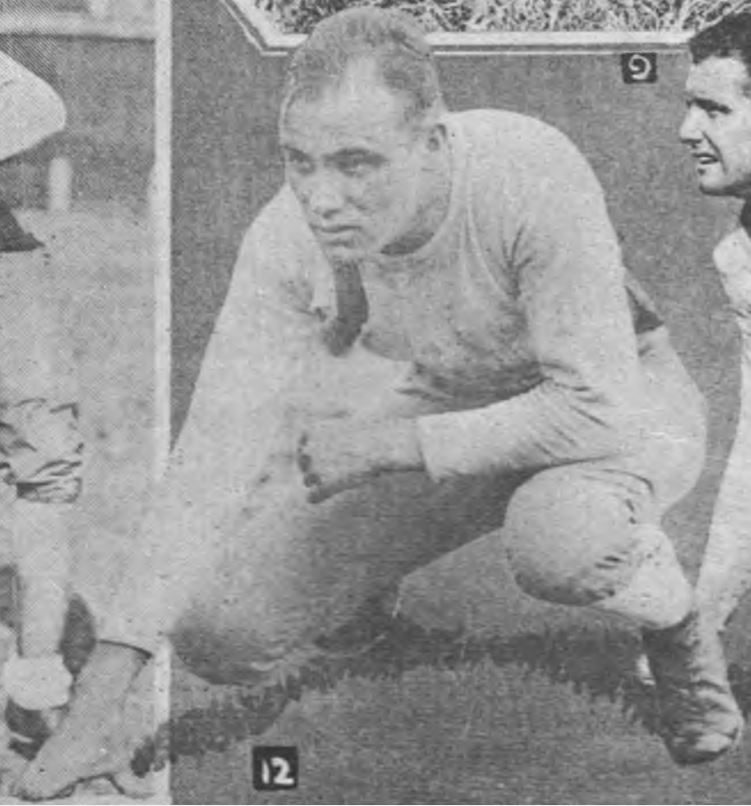
- Poole in 1925

No. 13
- Position: Center

Personal information
- Born: November 27, 1903
- Died: August 28, 1979; Georgia, U.S.
- Listed weight: 155 lb (70 kg)

Career information
- High school: Boys
- College: Georgia Tech (1925–1926)

Awards and highlights
- All-Southern (1925, 1926)

Willard Owen Pool (November 27, 1903 – August 28, 1979) was an American college football player.

== Early life ==
Pool was born to Willard Hosea Pool on November 27, 1903. His grandfather Patrick Vickhouse Columbus Pool was an early settler of Milan, Kansas.

=== College football ===
Pool played center for the Georgia Tech Yellow Jackets of the Georgia Institute of Technology. He entered Tech in the fall of 1923, and played on the freshman team. Pool was selected All-Southern in 1925 and 1926, and was captain in 1926. He "bested every center in the North or the South who opposed him, and left no doubt in the minds of the spectators who was the better man."

He married Ruth Dupree.
