= Herschel Caldwell =

American football player and coach (1903–1989)

Biographical details
- Born: August 13, 1903; Des Arc, Missouri, U.S.
- Died: July 31, 1989 (aged 85); Durham, North Carolina, U.S.
- Education: University of Alabama

Playing career
- 1925-26: Alabama
- Position: End/Fullback

Coaching career (HC unless noted)
- 1927-29: Sidney Lanier High School
- 1930-71: Duke (assistant)

Accomplishments and honors

Championships
- 2× National champion (1925, 1926)

Awards
- All-Southern (1926)

Herschel Amos Caldwell (August 13, 1903 – July 31, 1989) was a college football player and coach.

== University of Alabama ==
Caldwell was a prominent end and fullback for Wallace Wade's Alabama Crimson Tide of the University of Alabama.

=== 1925 ===
He was a member of the first Southern team to win a Rose Bowl in 1925.

=== 1926 ===
He was selected All-Southern in 1926. Caldwell made the extra point to tie Stanford in the Rose Bowl the next year. Caldwell was called by one source "one of the greatest defensive backs the South has produced in years." He also caught many balls thrown by Hoyt Winslett.

== Coaching career ==
=== Sidney Lanier High ===
He later coached, first at Sidney Lanier High School.

=== Duke ===
Caldwell then coached under his former mentor Wade as an assistant at Duke. He remained in this capacity in one form or another, working from freshman coach to varsity end coach, for forty years.
