= Carter Barron =

American football player and motion picture executive

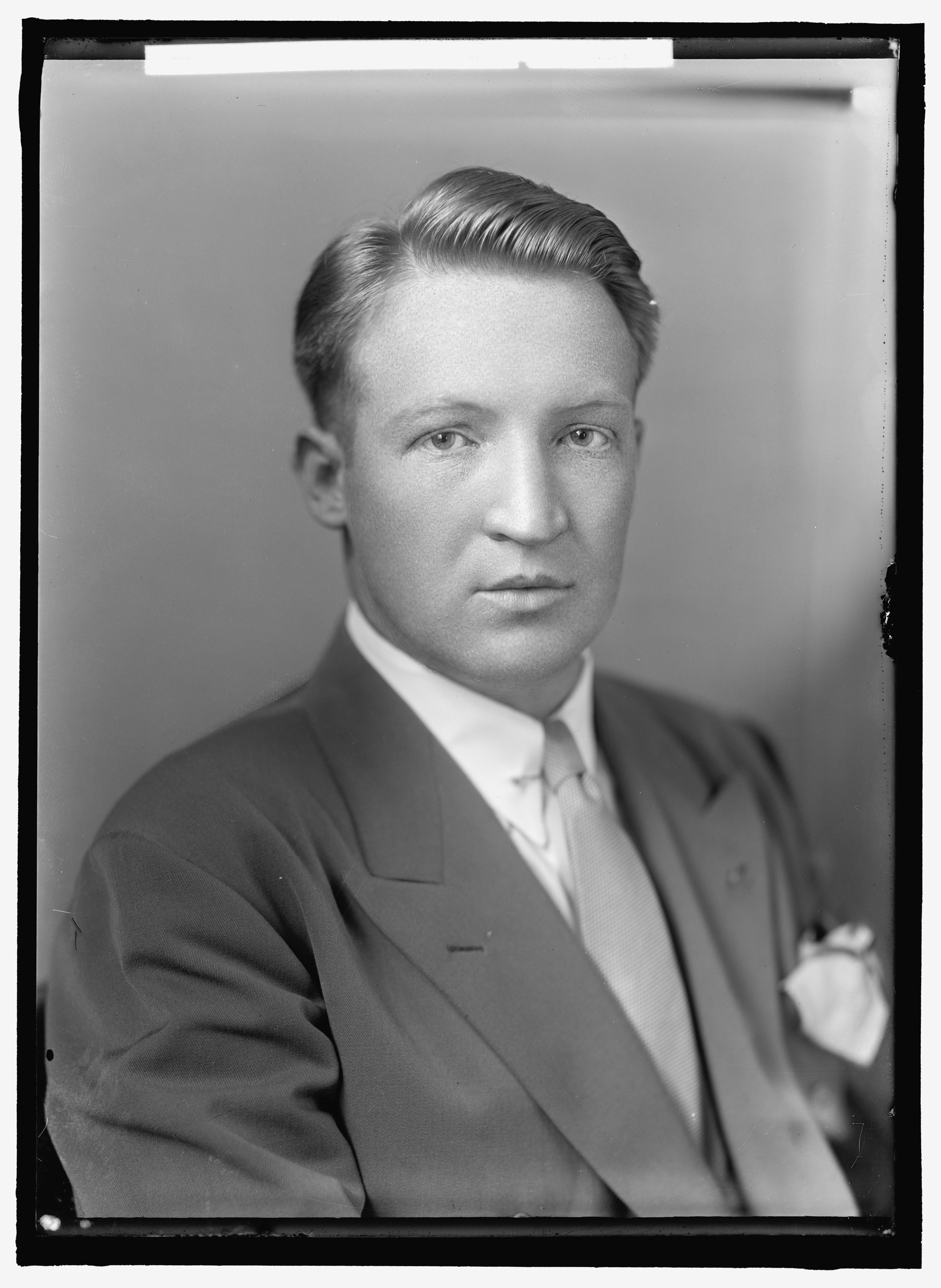
- Born: January 30, 1905; Clarkesville, Georgia
- Died: November 16, 1950 (aged 45); Washington, D. C.
- Occupation: Motion picture executive
- Football career

Profile
- Position: Halfback

Career information
- College: Georgia Tech (1924–1926)

Awards and highlights
- All-Southern (1926)

Carter Tate Barron (January 30, 1905 – November 16, 1950) was a college football player and motion picture executive.

== College football ==
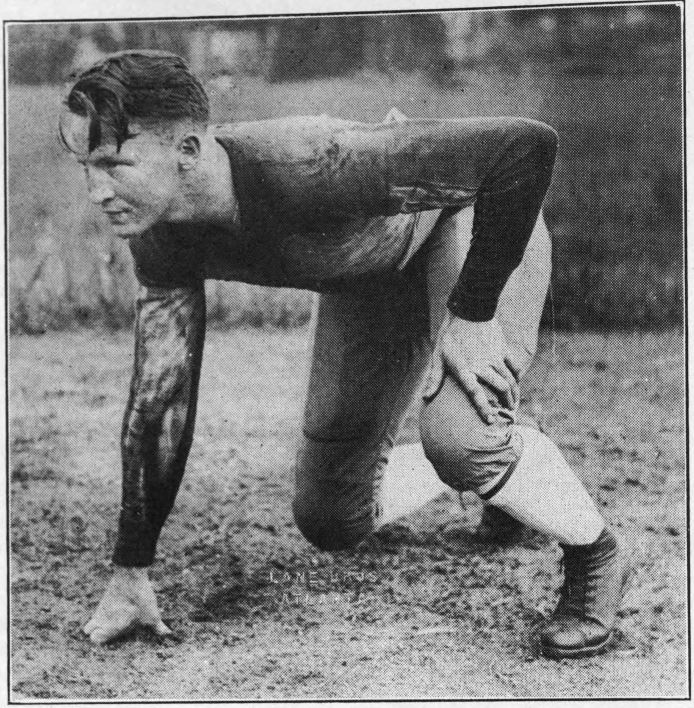
Barron in 1925

Carter Barron was one of a trio of football playing brothers for Bill Alexander's Georgia Tech Yellow Jackets football teams, younger than Red Barron and older than Pat Barron. Carter was selected an All-Southern halfback in 1926. A knee injury ultimately ended his football career. Carter also played on the baseball, basketball, and lacrosse teams.

== Motion picture executive ==
In 1942, he was named Washington representative of Metro-Goldwyn-Mayer studios.

== Amphitheatre ==
The Carter Barron Amphitheatre is located in Rock Creek Park of Washington, D. C. The plan was expanded upon by Barron as Vice-Chairman for the Sesquicentennial Commission in 1947 as a way to memorialize the 150th Anniversary of Washington, D. C. as the nation's capital.

== Personal life ==
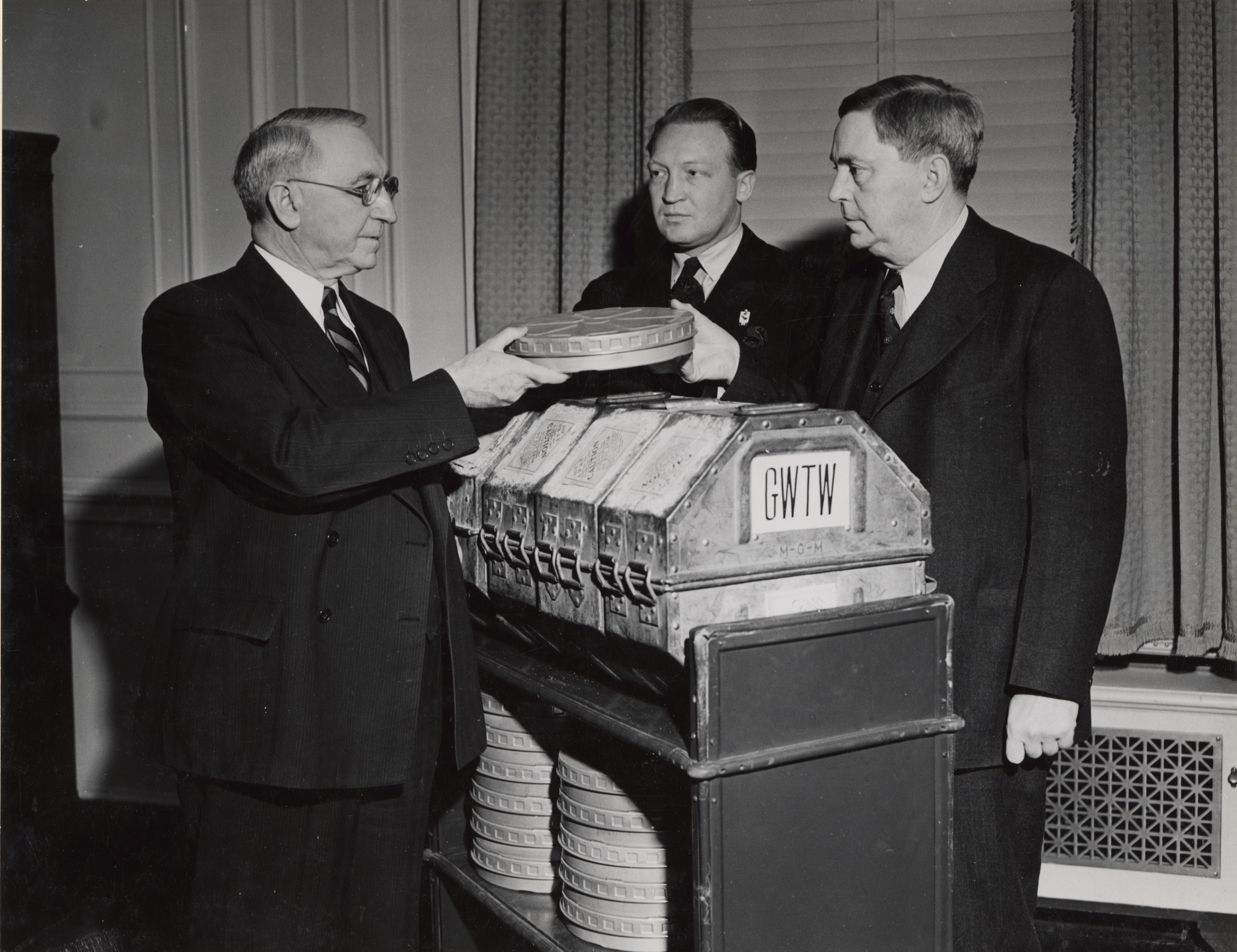
Barron handling Gone With the Wind.

Politically a Democrat, Barron was a personal friend of presidents Harry Truman and Franklin D. Roosevelt.

Two of Carter Barron's nieces, Jo Barron Atchison and Alae Risse Lietch, began attending Georgia Tech games when they were young in the 1930s because of tickets sent by Carter Barron. Atchison and Lietch in 2017, were featured in an article in the Atlanta Journal Constitution about their long standing attendance to Tech Football games started by Carter Barron.

== See also ==
- 1926 College Football All-Southern Team
