= Mack Tharpe =

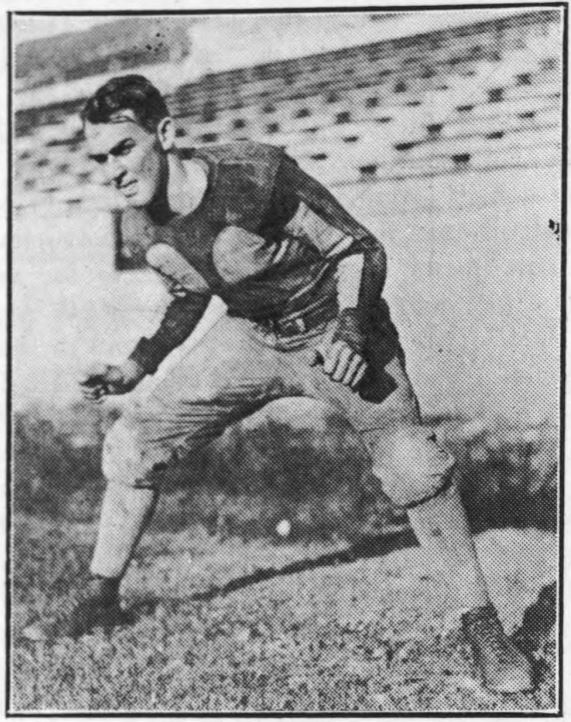
- Tharpe in 1925

Biographical details
- Born: July 12, 1903; Moultrie, Georgia, U.S.
- Died: February 21, 1945 (aged 41); North Pacific Ocean, off Iwo Jima, Volcano Islands, Empire of Japan
- Education: Georgia Institute of Technology

Playing career
- 1925–1926: Georgia Tech
- Position: T

Coaching career (HC unless noted)
- 1928-1941: Georgia Tech (assistant)

Accomplishments and honors

Awards
- All-Southern (1926); Tech Athletic Hall of Fame

Mercer McCall "Mack" Tharpe (July 12, 1903 – February 21, 1945) was a college football player and coach, bomber pilot, and insurance salesman. He was killed in action during the Second World War.

== Georgia Tech ==
Tharpe was a prominent tackle for William Alexander's Georgia Tech Yellow Jackets football team, selected All-Southern in 1926.

He returned to his alma mater to coach in 1928, promoted to line coach in 1934. In 1931, he sought a scouting report on North Carolina, and Robert Neyland had Bobby Dodd explain the defense to him.

Along with Alexander he is the namesake of the Alexander-Tharpe fund. Tharpe was inducted into the Georgia Tech Athletics Hall of Fame in 1961.
