= 1925 Pacific Coast Conference football season =

American college football season

- Sport: Football
- Teams: 9
- Champion: Washington

Football seasons
- 1924 1926

1925 Pacific Coast Conference football standings
	Conf.					Overall
Team	W		L		T	W		L		T
No. 7 Washington $	5	–	0	–	0	10	–	1	–	1
No. 8 Stanford	4	–	1	–	0	7	–	2	–	0
USC	3	–	2	–	0	11	–	2	–	0
Oregon Agricultural	3	–	2	–	0	7	–	2	–	0
California	2	–	2	–	0	6	–	3	–	0
Idaho	2	–	3	–	0	3	–	5	–	0
Washington State	2	–	3	–	0	3	–	4	–	1
Montana	1	–	4	–	0	3	–	4	–	1
Oregon	0	–	5	–	0	1	–	5	–	1
$ – Conference champion; Rankings from Dickinson System

The 1925 Pacific Coast Conference football season was the 11th season of college football played by the member schools of the Pacific Coast Conference (PCC) and was a part of the 1925 college football season.

The 1925 Washington Huskies football team, led by head coach Enoch Bagshaw, won the conference championship with a 10–1–1 overall record (5–0 against PCC opponents). The Huskies were undefeated in the regular season but lost to national champion Alabama by a 20–19 score in the 1926 Rose Bowl. Washington's backfield star Wildcat Wilson was a consensus pick for the 1925 All-America team. Other key players included quarterback George Guttormsen and fullback Elmer Tesreau. The Huskies led the PCC in scoring with an average of 40.0 points per game.

The 1925 Stanford football team, led by head coach Pop Warner, finished in second place with a 7–2 overall record (4–1 against PCC opponents). Stanford's fullback Ernie Nevers was a consensus first-team All-American. Other key players included end Ted Shipkey and guard Fred H. Swan.

The 1925 USC Trojans football team, led by first-year head coach Howard Jones, tied for third place with an 11–2 overall record (3–2 against PCC opponents). The Trojans led the PCC in scoring defense, allowing only an average of only 4.2 points per game. Key players for USC included quarterback Morley Drury, guard Brice Taylor, center Jeff Cravath, and end Hobbs Adams.

The 1925 Oregon Agricultural Aggies football team, led by head coach, Paul J. Schissler, tied with USC for third place. The Aggies compiled a 7–2 overall record (3–2 against PCC opponents). Key players included halfback Wes Schulmerich and tackles Lewis "Hip" Dickerson and Jim Dixon.

== Season overview ==
=== Results and team statistics ===
Conf. Rank	Team	Head coach	Overall record	Conf. record	PPG	PAG
1	Washington	Enoch Bagshaw	10–1–1	5–0	**40.0**	4.9
2	Stanford	Pop Warner	7–2	4–1	25.7	7.9
3	USC	Howard Jones	11–2	3–2	35.1	**4.2**
3	Oregon Agricultural	Paul J. Schissler	7–2	3–2	29.8	9.0
5	California	Andy Smith	6–3	2–2	21.3	5.4
6	Washington State	Albert Exendine	3–4–1	2–3	8.4	13.0
6	Idaho	Robert L. Mathews	3–5	2–3	9.9	19.1
8	Montana	Earl Clark	3–4–1	1–4	17.9	16.0
9	Oregon	Richard Shore Smith	1–5–1	0–5	7.6	15.4

Key
PPG = Average of points scored per game
PAG = Average of points allowed per game

=== Regular season ===
Index to colors and formatting
Non-conference matchup; PCC member won
Non-conference matchup; PCC member lost
Non-conference matchup; tie
Conference matchup
PCC teams displayed in **bold**

==== September 26 ====
On September 26, four PCC teams opened their seasons with five non-conference games. USC played a double-header. The five games resulted in four victories and one loss. The loss was sustained by Stanford against San Francisco's strong Olympic Club team.

Date	Home team	Visiting team	Site	Result	Attendance	Source
September 26	**Washington**	Willamette	Husky Stadium, Seattle, WA	**W** 108–0	3,500	
September 26	**Stanford**	Olympic Club	Stanford Stadium, Stanford, CA	**L** 0–9	11,000	
September 26	**USC**	Whittier	Los Angeles Memorial Coliseum, Los Angeles, CA	**W** 74–0	25,000	
September 26	**USC**	Caltech	Los Angeles Memorial Coliseum, Los Angeles, CA	**W** 32–0	25,000	
September 26	**California**	Santa Clara	California Memorial Stadium, Berkeley, CA	**W** 28–0		

==== October 2–3 ====
Over the weekend of October 2–3, the nine PCC teams played nine games, with Washington hosting a double-header. Only one intra-conference game was played. In eight non-conference games, the PCC compiled a record of seven wins, no losses, and one tie. The tie game was played between Oregon and the Multnomah Athletic Club of Portland.

Date	Home team	Visiting team	Site	Result	Attendance	Source
October 2	Idaho	College of Idaho	MacLean Field, Moscow, ID	**W** 16–14		
October 3	Montana	**Washington State**	Dornblaser Field, Missoula, MT	**W** 9-0	4,000-5,000	
October 3	Washington	USS Oklahoma	Husky Stadium, Seattle, WA	**W** 59–0	3,000	
October 3	Washington	West Seattle A.C.	Husky Stadium, Seattle, WA	**W** 56–0	3,000	
October 3	Stanford	Santa Clara	Stanford Stadium, Stanford, CA	**W** 20–3	13,000	
October 3	USC	Pomona	Los Angeles Memorial Coliseum, Los Angeles, CA	**W** 80–0		
October 3	Oregon Agricultural	Willamette	Bell Field, Corvallis, OR	**W** 51-0		
October 3	California	Nevada	California Memorial Stadium, Berkeley, CA	**W** 54–0		
October 3	Oregon	Multnomah Athletic Club	Hayward Field, Eugene, OR	**T** 0-0		

==== October 9–10 ====
Over the weekend of October 9–10, the PCC teams played two intra-conference games and four non-conference games. Washington State did not play a game. The non-conference games resulted in three wins and one loss. The loss was sustained by California against the same Olympic Club team that defeated Stanford two weeks earlier.

Date	Home team	Visiting team	Site	Result	Attendance	Source
October 9	Oregon Agricultural	Gonzaga	Bell Field, Corvallis, OR	**W** 22-0		
October 10	Washington	**Montana**	Husky Stadium, Seattle, WA	**W** 30–10	20,000	
October 10	Oregon	**Idaho**	Hayward Field, Eugene, OR	**L** 0–6		
October 10	Stanford	Occidental	Stanford Stadium, Stanford, CA	**W** 28–0		
October 10	USC	Utah	Los Angeles Memorial Coliseum, Los Angeles, CA	**W** 28–2	18,000	
October 10	California	Olympic Club	California Memorial Stadium, Berkeley, CA	**L** 0–15	50,000	

==== October 17 ====
On October 17, the PCC teams played two intra-conference games and five non-conference games. The non-conference games resulted in three wins, no losses, and two ties. Washington and Nebraska played to a 6–6 tie, the only blemish on Washington's undefeated regular season. Stanford established itself in second place with a road victory over USC. California and Saint Mary's also played to a 6–6 tie.

Date	Home team	Visiting team	Site	Result	Attendance	Source
October 17	**USC**	**Stanford**	Los Angeles Memorial Coliseum, Los Angeles, CA	**L** 9–13	70,000	
October 17	**Washington State**	**Idaho**	Rogers Field, Pullman, WA	**L** 6–7	10,000	
October 17	Nebraska	**Washington**	Memorial Stadium, Lincoln, NE	**T** 6–6	15,000	
October 17	**Oregon Agricultural**	Whitman	Multnomah Field, Portland, OR	**W** 62-0		
October 17	**California**	Saint Mary's	California Memorial Stadium, Berkeley, CA	**W** 6–0	70,000	
October 17	**Montana**	Gonzaga	Clark Park, Butte, MT	**T** 14–14	2,000	
October 17	**Oregon**	Pacific (OR)	Hayward Field, Eugene, OR	**W** 13-0		

==== October 24 ====
On October 24, the PCC teams played two intra-conference games and four non-conference games. Washington State did not play a game. The non-conference games resulted in three wins and one loss. Stanford defeated Oregon Agricultural to further establish itself in second place in the conference. The non-conference loss was sustained by Idaho in a road game against Gonzaga.

Date	Home team	Visiting team	Site	Result	Attendance	Source
October 24	**Stanford**	**Oregon Agricultural**	Stanford Stadium, Stanford, CA	**W** 26–10	29,000	
October 24	**Oregon**	**California**	Multnomah Field, Portland, OR	**L** 0–28	20,000	
October 24	**Washington**	Whitman	Husky Stadium, Seattle, WA	**W** 64–2	2,000	
October 24	**USC**	Arizona	Los Angeles Memorial Coliseum, Los Angeles, CA	**W** 56–0	17,000	
October 24	Gonzaga	**Idaho**	Gonzaga Stadium, Spokane, WA	**L** 3–12		
October 24	**Montana**	Montana Mines	Dornblaser Field, Missoula, MT	**W** 57–0		

==== October 30–31 ====
Over the weekend of October 30–31, PCC teams played four intra-conference games and one non-conference game.

Date	Home team	Visiting team	Site	Result	Attendance	Source
October 30	**Idaho**	**USC**	MacLean Field, Moscow, ID	**L** 7–51	5,000	
October 31	**Washington State**	**Washington**	Rogers Field, Pullman, WA	**L**0–23	2,500	
October 31	**Stanford**	**Oregon**	Stanford Stadium, Stanford, CA	**W** 35–13	11,000	
October 31	**Oregon Agricultural**	**Montana**	Bell Field, Corvallis, OR	**W** 27-7		
October 31	Pomona	**California**	Los Angeles Memorial Coliseum, Los Angeles, CA	**W** 27–0	20,000	

==== November 7 ====
On November 7, PCC teams played three intra-conference games and two-non-conference games. Oregon did not play a game. Washington defeated Stanford in a game that decided the conference championship. The two non-conference games resulted in victories.

Date	Home team	Visiting team	Site	Result	Attendance	Source
November 7	**Washington**	**Stanford**	Husky Stadium, Seattle, WA	**W** 13–0	40,000	
November 7	**California**	**Washington State**	California Memorial Stadium, Berkeley, CA	**W** 35–7	30,000	
November 7	**Idaho**	**Montana**	MacLean Field, Moscow, ID	**L** 14–20		
November 7	**USC**	Santa Clara	Los Angeles Memorial Coliseum, Los Angeles, CA	**W** 29–9	> 20,000	
November 7	**Oregon Agricultural**	Pacific (OR)	Bell Field, Corvallis, OR	**W** 56-0		

==== November 14 ====
On November 14, PCC teams played three intra-conference games and one non-conference game. Idaho and Washington State did not play games. In the non-conference game Stanford defeated the Southern Branch of the University of California (later renamed UCLA).

Date	Home team	Visiting team	Site	Result	Attendance	Source
November 14	**California**	**Washington**	California Memorial Stadium, Berkeley, CA	**L** 0–7	72,000	
November 14	**USC**	**Montana**	Los Angeles Memorial Coliseum, Los Angeles, CA	**W** 27–7	25,000	
November 14	**Oregon**	**Oregon Agricultural**	Hayward Field, Eugene, OR	**L** 13-24		
November 14	**Stanford**	Southern Branch	Stanford Stadium, Stanford, CA	**W** 82–0		

==== November 21 ====
On November 21, the conference teams played two intra-conference games and three non-conference games. Montana and Oregon did not play games. In the annual Big Game, Stanford defeated California, 26–14, before a crowd of 74,000, the largest crowd to attend a PCC game in 1925. The non-conference games resulted in two victories and one tie. USC defeated Big Ten opponent Iowa, 18–0. Washington State and Gonzaga played to a scoreless tie.

Date	Home team	Visiting team	Site	Result	Attendance	Source
November 21	**Stanford**	**California**	Stanford Stadium, Stanford, CA	**W** 26–14	74,000	
November 21	**Idaho**	**Oregon Agricultural**	Public School Field, Boise, ID	**W** 16-7		
November 21	**USC**	Iowa	Los Angeles Memorial Coliseum, Los Angeles, CA	**W** 18–0	66,000	
November 21	Puget Sound	**Washington**	Tacoma, WA	**W** 80–7	2,000	
November 21	Gonzaga	**Washington State**	Gonzaga Stadium, Spokane, WA	**T** 0–0	6,000	

==== November 26–28 ====
Date	Home team	Visiting team	Site	Result	Attendance	Source
November 26	**Washington**	**Oregon**	Husky Stadium, Seattle, WA	**W** 15–14	23,000	
November 26	Creighton	**Idaho**	Creighton Stadium, Omaha, NE	**L** 19–34		
November 28	**USC**	**Washington State**	Los Angeles Memorial Coliseum, Los Angeles, CA	**L** 12–17	12,000	
November 28	**Montana**	Montana State	Dornblaser Field, Missoula, MT	**W** 28–7		

==== December 5 ====
Date	Home team	Visiting team	Site	Result	Attendance	Source
December 5	**USC**	**Oregon Agricultural**	Los Angeles Memorial Coliseum, Los Angeles, CA	**W** 28–0	25,000	

==== December 12 ====
Date	Home team	Visiting team	Site	Result	Attendance	Source
December 12	**USC**	Saint Mary's (CA)	Los Angeles Memorial Coliseum, Los Angeles, CA	**W** 12–0	25,000	

=== Post-season games ===
Date	Home team	Visiting team	Site	Result	Attendance	Source
December 26	Honolulu Town Team	**Washington State**	Moiliili Field, Honolulu, Territory of Hawaii	**W** 24-7	10,000	
January 1, 1926	Hawaii	**Washington State**	Honolulu, Territory of Hawaii	**L** 11-20	10,000	
January 1, 1926	**Washington**	Alabama	Rose Bowl, Pasadena, CA (Rose Bowl)	**L** 19–20	55,000	

== All-Pacific Coast players ==
The following players were selected by the United Press as first-team players on the 1925 All-Big Ten Conference football team.

- Bill Kelly, quarterback, Montana (College Football Hall of Fame)
- Morley Drury, halfback, USC
- Wildcat Wilson, halfback, Washington (College Football Hall of Fame)
- Ernie Nevers, fullback, Stanford (College and Pro Football Halls of Fame)
- Ted Shipkey, end, Stanford
- Hobbs Adams, end, USC
- Walden Erickson, tackle, Washington
- Jim Dixon, tackle, Oregon Aggies
- Dana Carey, guard, California
- Brice Taylor, guard, USC
- Jeff Cravath, center, USC

== All-Americans ==
Two PCC players were consensus first-team selections to the 1925 College Football All-America Team:

- Ernie Nevers of Stanford at back
- Wildcat Wilson of Washington at back

Other PCC players receiving first-team honors from at least one official selector included:

- Brice Taylor of USC at guard (by the Football Writers Association of America)
- Dana Carey of California at guard (by Liberty magazine)
