= 1925 All-Pacific Coast football team =

American all-star college football team

The 1925 All-Pacific Coast Conference football team consists of American football players chosen by various organizations for All-Pacific Coast teams for the 1925 college football season.

== All-Pacific Coast selections ==
=== Quarterback ===
- Bill Kelly, Montana (UP-1; AS-1; GW-1; NB-1) (College Football Hall of Fame)
- George Guttormsen, Washington (UP-2)

=== Halfbacks ===
- Morley Drury, USC (UP-1; AS-1; GW-1)
- Wildcat Wilson, Washington (UP-1; AS-1; GW-1) (College Football Hall of Fame)
- Tut Imlay, California (UP-2)
- Wes Schulmerich, Oregon Aggies (UP-2)

=== Fullback ===
- Ernie Nevers, Stanford (UP-1; AS-1; GW-1; NB-1) (College and Pro Football Halls of Fame)
- Elmer Tesreau, Washington (UP-2)

=== Ends ===
- Ted Shipkey, Stanford (UP-1; AS-1; GW-1; NB-1)
- Hobbs Adams, USC (UP-1; NB-1)
- Judson Cutting, Washington (AS-1)
- Robert Mautz, Oregon (GW-1)
- Edgar Walker, Stanford (UP-2)
- Clifford Marker, Washington State (UP-2)

=== Tackles ===
- Walden Erickson, Washington (UP-1; AS-1; GW-1; NB-1)
- Lewis "Hip" Dickerson, Oregon Aggies (AS-1; GW-1)
- Jim Dixon, Oregon Aggies (UP-1)
- John Sargent, California (UP-2)
- Ted Bucklin, Idaho (UP-2)

=== Guards ===
- Dana Carey, California (UP-1; AS-1; GW-1)
- Fred H. Swan, Stanford (UP-2; AS-1; GW-1)
- Brice Taylor, USC (UP-1; NB-1)
- Gene Shields, Oregon (UP-2)
- Egbert Brix, Washington (UP-2)

=== Centers ===
- Jeff Cravath, USC (UP-1; GW-1)
- Larry Bettencourt, St. Mary's (NB-1) (College Football Hall of Fame)
- Otis Miller, California (AS-1)
- Douglas Bonamy, Washington (UP-2)

== Key ==
UP = United Press, based on polling of "eleven leading football writers on the coast"

AS = Andy Smith, head coach at California

GW = Glenn Scobey Warner, head coach at Stanford

NB = Norman E. Brown

Bold = Consensus first-team selection

== See also ==
- 1925 College Football All-America Team
