= Richard Shore Smith =

American football player and coach (1877–1953)

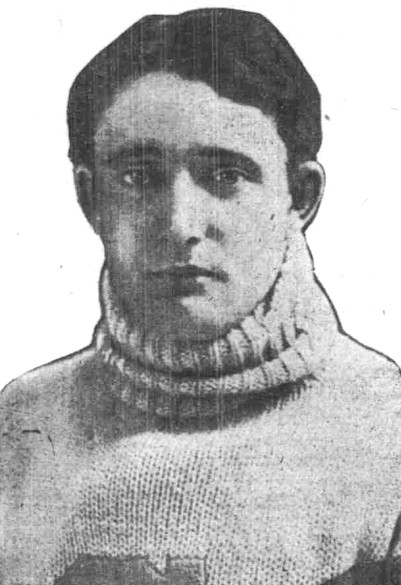
- Smith, c. 1904

Biographical details
- Born: December 11, 1877; Mountain View, California, U.S.
- Died: May 19, 1953 (aged 75); Eugene, Oregon, U.S.

Playing career
- 1896–1899: Oregon
- 1901–1903: Columbia
- Position: Fullback

Coaching career (HC unless noted)
- 1904: Oregon
- 1925: Oregon

Head coaching record
- Overall: 6–8–1

Accomplishments and honors

Awards
- Consensus All-American (1903)

Richard Shore Smith (December 11, 1877 – May 19, 1953) was an American college football player and coach. He played college football at the University of Oregon from 1896 to 1899 and then at Columbia University, where he attended law school. Playing as a fullback for Columbia in 1903, Smith was named an All-American. He served as the head football coach at Oregon in 1904 and again in 1925, compiling a record of 6–8–1. Smith practiced law in Oregon and was president of the First National Bank in Eugene, Oregon. He died at the age of 74 on May 19, 1953, at his home in Eugene.

== Head coaching record ==
Year	Team	Overall	Conference	Standing	Bowl/playoffs
Oregon Webfoots (Independent) (1904)
1904	Oregon	5–3			
Oregon Webfoots (Northwest Conference / Pacific Coast Conference) (1925)
1925	Oregon	1–5–1	1–3 / 0–5	T–6th / 9th	
Oregon:		6–8–1	1–5		
Total:		6–8–1			
