= 1925 Maine Black Bears football team =

American college football season

1925 Maine Black Bears football

MIAA champion
- Conference: New England Conference, Maine Intercollegiate Athletic Association
- Record: 5–2–1 (1–0–1 New England, 3–0 MIAA)
- Head coach: Fred Brice (5th season)
- Home stadium: Alumni Field

1925 New England Conference football standings
| | Conf. | | | | | Overall |
| Team | W | | L | | T | W | | L | | T |
|---|---|---|---|---|---|---|---|---|---|---|
| New Hampshire $ | 2 | – | 0 | – | 1 | 4 | – | 1 | – | 2 |
| Maine | 1 | – | 0 | – | 1 | 5 | – | 2 | – | 1 |
| Massachusetts | 1 | – | 0 | – | 0 | 6 | – | 2 | – | 0 |
| Rhode Island State | 0 | – | 1 | – | 1 | 2 | – | 5 | – | 1 |
| Connecticut | 0 | – | 3 | – | 1 | 3 | – | 5 | – | 1 |
$ – Conference champion

The 1925 Maine Black Bears football team was an American football team that represented the University of Maine as a member of the New England Conference and Maine Intercollegiate Athletic Association during the 1925 college football season. In its fifth season under head coach Fred Brice, the team compiled a 5–2–1 record, going 1–0–1 against New England and 3–0 against MIAA conference opponents.

With victories over Fort Williams, Bates, Colby, and Bowdoin, the team was recognized as the Maine state champion for 1925. The team also lost to undefeated national champion Dartmouth by a 56 to 0 score.

Maine played its home games at Alumni Field in Orono, Maine. Oren Fraser was the team captain. Willis Barrows was the leading scorer with six touchdowns for 36 points.

== Schedule ==
| Date | Opponent | Site | Result | Attendance | Source |
|---|---|---|---|---|---|
| September 26 | Fort Williams* | Alumni Field; Orono, ME | W 33–0 | | |
| October 3 | Tufts* | Alumni Field; Orono, ME | L 6–7 | | |
| October 10 | at Connecticut | Gardner Dow Athletic Fields; Storrs, CT | W 7–0 | | |
| October 17 | at Dartmouth* | Memorial Field; Hanover, NH | L 0–56 | | |
| October 24 | Bates | Alumni Field; Orono, ME | W 16–7 | | |
| October 31 | at Colby | Seaverns Field; Waterville, ME | W 27–6 | | |
| November 7 | Bowdoin | Alumni Field; Orono, ME | W 28–14 | | |
| November 14 | New Hampshire | Alumni Field; Orono, ME (rivalry) | T 0–0 | | |
*Non-conference game
