= 1925 USC Trojans football team =

American college football season

1925 USC Trojans football
- Conference: Pacific Coast Conference
- Record: 11–2 (3–2 PCC)
- Head coach: Howard Jones (1st season)
- Offensive scheme: Single-wing
- Captain: Hobbs Adams
- Home stadium: Los Angeles Memorial Coliseum

1925 Pacific Coast Conference football standings
	Conf.					Overall
Team	W		L		T	W		L		T
No. 7 Washington $	5	–	0	–	0	10	–	1	–	1
No. 8 Stanford	4	–	1	–	0	7	–	2	–	0
USC	3	–	2	–	0	11	–	2	–	0
Oregon Agricultural	3	–	2	–	0	7	–	2	–	0
California	2	–	2	–	0	6	–	3	–	0
Idaho	2	–	3	–	0	3	–	5	–	0
Washington State	2	–	3	–	0	3	–	4	–	1
Montana	1	–	4	–	0	3	–	4	–	1
Oregon	0	–	5	–	0	1	–	5	–	1
$ – Conference champion; Rankings from Dickinson System

The 1925 USC Trojans football team was an American football team that represented the University of Southern California (USC) as a member of the Pacific Coast Conference (PCC) during the 1925 PCC football season. In its first year under head coach Howard Jones, the team compiled an 11–2 record (3–2 against PCC opponents), tied for third place in the PCC, and outscored opponents by a total of 456 to 55.

USC had only one road game during the 1925 season, its first (and only) trip to Moscow, Idaho, to play the 1925 Idaho Vandals.

Four USC players received first-team honors on the 1925 All-Pacific Coast football teams selected by the United Press (UP), Andy Smith (AS), Pop Warner (PW), and Norman E. Brown (NB): halfback Morley Drury (UP-1; AS-1; PW-1); end Hobbs Adams (UP-1; NB-1); guard Brice Taylor (UP-1; NB-1); and center Jeff Cravath (UP-1; PW-1). One player on the team would become notable for a career off the field, offensive tackle Marion Morrison, who is better known by his stage name of John Wayne.

== Schedule ==
Date	Opponent	Site	Result	Attendance	Source
September 26	Whittier*	Los Angeles Memorial Coliseum; Los Angeles, CA	W 74–0	25,000	
September 26	Caltech*	Los Angeles Memorial Coliseum; Los Angeles, CA	W 32–0	25,000	
October 3	Pomona*	Los Angeles Memorial Coliseum; Los Angeles, CA	W 80–0		
October 10	Utah*	Los Angeles Memorial Coliseum; Los Angeles, CA	W 28–2	18,000	
October 17	Stanford	Los Angeles Memorial Coliseum; Los Angeles, CA (rivalry)	L 9–13	70,000	
October 24	Arizona*	Los Angeles Memorial Coliseum; Los Angeles, CA	W 56–0	17,000	
October 30	at Idaho	MacLean Field; Moscow, ID	W 51–7	5,000	
November 7	Santa Clara	Los Angeles Memorial Coliseum; Los Angeles, CA	W 29–9	> 20,000	
November 14	Montana	Los Angeles Memorial Coliseum; Los Angeles, CA	W 27–7	25,000	
November 21	Iowa*^{†}	Los Angeles Memorial Coliseum; Los Angeles, CA	W 18–0	66,000	
November 28	Washington State	Los Angeles Memorial Coliseum; Los Angeles, CA	L 12–17	12,000	
December 5	Oregon Agricultural	Los Angeles Memorial Coliseum; Los Angeles, CA	W 28–0	25,000	
December 12	Saint Mary's*	Los Angeles Memorial Coliseum; Los Angeles, CA	W 12–0	25,000	
*Non-conference game; ^{†}Homecoming

== Roster ==
1925 USC Trojans football team roster
Players
Coaches
Offense

Pos.	#	Name	Class
E		Hobbs Adams
HB		Morley Drury
OT		Marion Morrison
G		Brice Taylor

Defense

Pos.	#	Name	Class

Special teams

Pos.	#	Name	Class

Head coach

- Howard Jones

Coordinators/assistant coaches

Legend

- (C) Team captain
- (S) Suspended
- (I) Ineligible
- Injured
- Redshirt
