= 1925 college football season =

American college football season

- Dartmouth's victory over Harvard; a pass from Oberlander to Tully
- Number of bowls: 1
- Bowl games: January 1, 1926
- Champion(s): Alabama (Note: per Berryman QPRS, Billingsley Report, Boand System, College Football Researchers Association, Helms Athletic Foundation, Houlgate System, National Championship Foundation, Poling System, and Sagarin Ratings Elo chess method); Dartmouth (Note: per Parke H. Davis (for Spalding's Official Foot Ball Guide) and Dickinson System); Michigan (Note: per Sagarin Ratings Predictor method) (not claimed)

The 1925 college football season ended with no clear national champion. At the close of the season, noted sports writer Billy Evans described the championship contest as "a dead heat" among Dartmouth, Tulane, Michigan, Washington, and Alabama.

Dartmouth, led by halfback Andy Oberlander, compiled an 8–0-0 record and outscored its opponents by a total of 340 to 29. Having defeated Harvard, Cornell, and Chicago, was declared the national champion at the end of the season by the Dickinson System, and retroactively by Parke H. Davis. Alabama compiled a 10–0-0 record and has been recognized (retroactively) as national champion by the Billingsley Report, Boand System, College Football Researchers Association, Helms Athletic Foundation, and others. In an intersectional game between undefeated teams, Alabama (9-0-0) defeated Pacific Coast Conference champion Washington (9-0-1) by a 20–19 score in the 1926 Rose Bowl; that game has been called "the game that changed the South."

Michigan shut out seven of eight opponents, outscored all opponents by a total of 227 to 3, and was retroactively named a co-national champion by Jeff Sagarin. The team featured two consensus All-Americans in quarterback Benny Friedman and end Bennie Oosterbaan, a passing combination that became known as the "Benny to Bennie Show". Michigan coach Fielding H. Yost called his 1925 squad "the greatest football team I ever saw in action."

Tulane also went undefeated at 9–0–1. Tulane halfback Peggy Flournoy led the nation in scoring with 128 points.

Colgate, Louisville, Michigan State Normal, Hawaii, Nebraska Wesleyan, and Oberlin also had undefeated teams in 1925.

The Dickinson System ratings were announced by Illinois economics professor Frank G. Dickinson on January 7, 1926, with his final rankings being (1) Dartmouth (20.00 pts); (2) Michigan and Alabama (both 19.18); (4) Colgate (18.75); (5) Missouri (16.25); (6) Tulane (15.00); (7), Washington (14.75); (8) Wisconsin and Stanford (13.75); (10) Pittsburgh (12.50); and (11) Lafayette (11.88)

== Conference and program changes ==
=== Conference changes ===
- Two conferences began play in 1925:
  - Far Western Conference – active through the 1998 season; later known as the Northern California Athletic Conference
  - New York State Conference – active through the 1934 season
- One conference played its final season in 1925:
  - Louisiana Intercollegiate Athletic Association – active since the 1912 season
- One conference changed its name in 1925:
  - The Southwest Intercollegiate Athletic Conference shortened its official name to just the Southwest Conference, the name it would retain until its dissolution in 1996.

=== Membership changes ===
School	1924 Conference	1925 Conference
Oklahoma A&M Cowboys	Southwest	Missouri Valley
Texas Tech Matadors	Program established	Independent
Western State (CO) Mountaineers	Independent	Rocky Mountain
Northern Branch Cal Aggies	Independent	Far Western (FWC)

== September ==
- On September 26, Washington opened its season with a 108–0 win over Willamette, Dartmouth defeated Norwich, 59–0, and Notre Dame beat Baylor, 41–0.

== October ==
- On October 3, Washington played a double-header and defeated both teams by scores of 59–0 and 56–0. Southern Conference co-champion Tulane and Missouri Valley champion Missouri played to a 3–3 tie in New Orleans. Michigan beat its rivel Michigan State, 39–0. Alabama defeated Birmingham–Southern, 50–7 in a Friday game. Dartmouth beat Hobart, 34–0.
- On October 10, Michigan beat Indiana 63–0, Alabama won at LSU, 42–0, and Tulane beat Ole Miss, 26–7. Missouri beat Nebraska, 9–6. Washington defeated visiting Montana 30–10. Dartmouth defeated Vermont, 50–0.
- On October 17 at Yankee Stadium, Army beat Notre Dame, 27–0. Washington and Nebraska played to a 6–6 tie at Lincoln. In Birmingham, Alabama beat Sewanee 42–0, while in New Orleans, Tulane beat Mississippi State, 25–3. Michigan won at Wisconsin 21–0. Colgate met Lafayette at Philadelphia, and the two played to a 7–7 tie. Dartmouth beat Maine 56–0.
- On October 24, Michigan narrowly won at Illinois, but recorded another shutout, 3–0. In Chicago, Tulane beat Northwestern, 18–7. In Atlanta, Alabama beat Georgia Tech, 7–0. Missouri beat Kansas State, 3–0. Washington beat Whitman College, 64–2, while Stanford beat Oregon State 26–10. Notre Dame won at Minnesota. 19–7. Colgate beat Princeton, 9–0, and Dartmouth won at Harvard, 32–9, its best victory to date over the Crimson. Penn beat visiting Chicago, 7–0.
- On October 31, Michigan stayed unbeaten, untied, and unscored upon, defeating visiting Navy, 54–0. In its first five games, Michigan had outscored the opposition 180–0. Syracuse also remained unscored upon with a 7–0 win over Penn State, having outscored its foes 160–0 in six games. Dartmouth stayed unbeaten with a 14–0 win at Brown. Penn dropped from the unbeaten ranks with a 24–2 loss to Illinois. Yale handed visiting Army its first loss, 28–7. Texas A&M won at Baylor, 13–0. Missouri beat Iowa State, 23–8. Washington won at Washington State, 23–0. Stanford beat Oregon 35–13 and Colgate won at Michigan State 14–0. In Atlanta, Notre Dame beat Georgia Tech, 13–0, while in Montgomery, Tulane beat Auburn by the same score. Alabama beat Mississippi State, 6–0.

== November ==
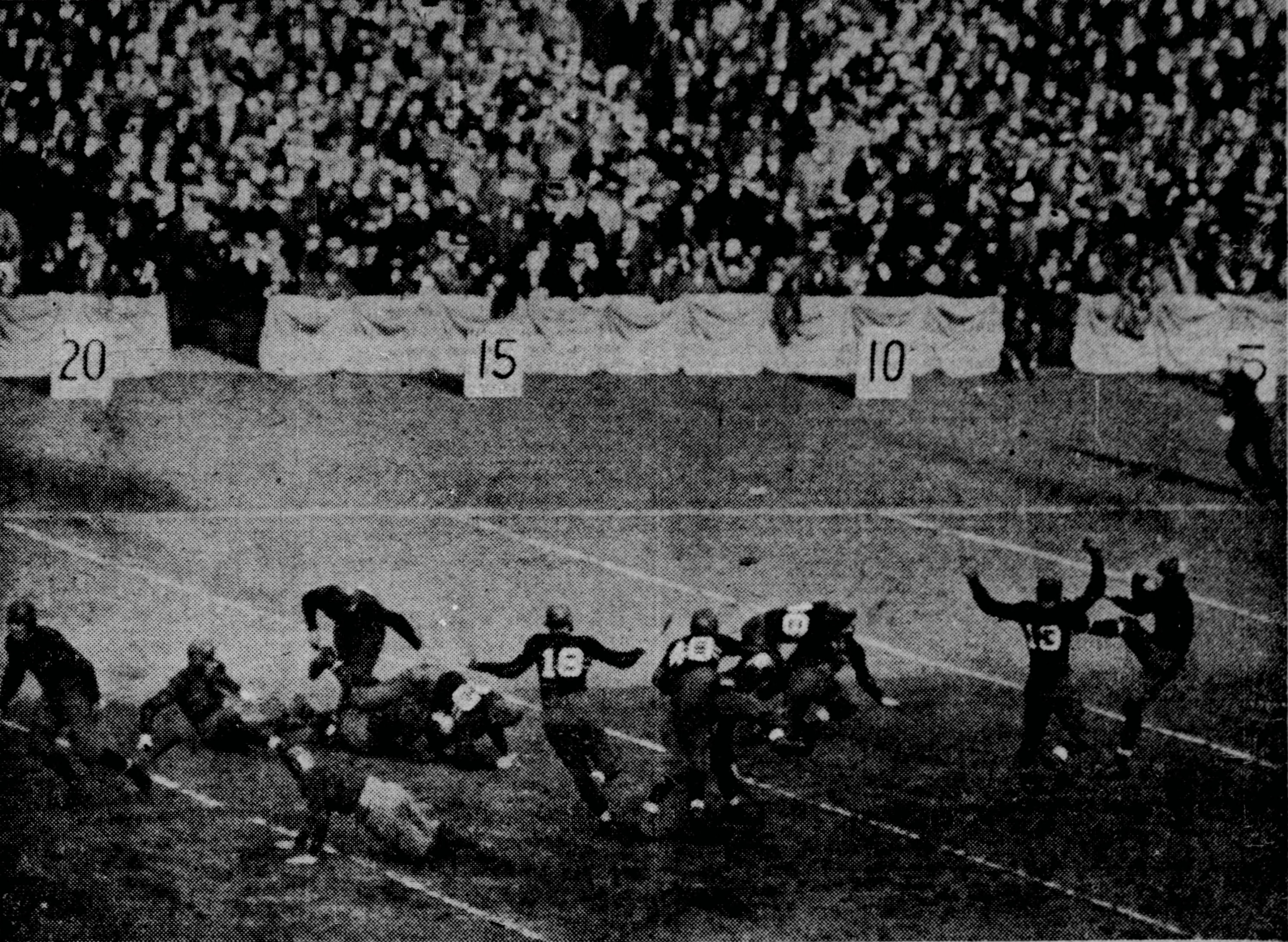
Army–Navy Game, November 28

- On November 7, Michigan (5–0–0) was upset by Northwestern, which won 3–2. The field goal represented the only score against Michigan in an otherwise perfect season. A steady downpour with 40–mile-per-hour winds and five inches of mud hindered Michigan's passing game. Dartmouth (6–0–0) hosted Cornell (5–0–0) in a meeting of unbeatens, winning 62–13. Andy Oberlander had 477 yards in total offense, including six touchdown passes, a Dartmouth record which still stands. Cornell coach Gil Dobie responded, "We won the game 13–0, passing is not football." Syracuse, which had not been scored upon in six games, was tied 3–3 by Ohio Wesleyan College. At Penn State, Notre Dame and the Nittany Lions played to a 0–0 tie. At St. Louis, Missouri beat Washington 14–0. Colgate beat Providence 19–7, Penn beat Haverford 66–0, and Army beat Davis & Elkins, 14–6. Texas A & M (5–0–1) and Texas Christian (4–1–1) met, with TCU handing the Aggies their first defeat, 3–0. Washington (6–0–1) hosted Stanford (5–1–0) and won 13–0. In Birmingham, Alabama beat Kentucky 31–0 and in New Orleans, Tulane beat Louisiana Tech 37–9. Georgia Tech beat Vanderbilt 7–0. Star back Doug Wycoff was hurt, such that he had to use his substitute Dick Wright. On a muddy field, Wright ran off tackle and dodged Vanderbilt's safety Gil Reese, "usually a sure tackler," to get the touchdown to give Georgia Tech a 7–0 victory. Coach William Alexander called it the most spectacular play he ever saw.
- On November 14, Syracuse hosted Colgate in a matchup of unbeatens (both 6–0–1); Colgate won 19–6. In New York, Columbia handed Army its first defeat, 21–7. Dartmouth won at Chicago, 33–7, to close with a perfect 8–0–0 record. Oberlander threw three touchdowns. At Montgomery, Alabama (8–0–0) met Florida (6–1–0) and won 34–0. Tulane shut out Sewanee, 14–0. In Houston, Texas A & M beat Rice 17–0, while TCU beat visiting Arkansas, 3–0. Missouri stayed unbeaten with a 16–14 win over Oklahoma, and Washington stayed unbeaten with a 7–0 win at California. Stanford beat visiting UCLA, 82–0. Michigan beat Ohio State 10–0. Cornell beat Canisius 33–0, Pittsburgh defeated Penn 14–0, and Notre Dame beat visiting Carnegie Tech 26–0. In the Georgia-Georgia Tech game, Tech quarterback Ike Williams thought the game clock read five seconds remaining in the game, when in actuality it was five minutes. Williams set up his offense for a field goal and kicked it to put Tech up 3–0 on first down. Luckily for Williams, Tech won 3–0.
- On November 21, previously unbeaten Missouri lost at Kansas, 10–7, Michigan beat Minnesota 35–0, Tulane won at LSU, 16–0, TCU defeated Austin College, 21–0, Washington beat Puget Sound 80–7, and Stanford closed its season with a 27–14 win over California. Syracuse beat Niagara 17–0, Notre Dame defeated Northwestern, 13–10, and Army beat Ursinus 44–0.
- On Thanksgiving Day, November 26, Syracuse and Columbia met at the Polo Grounds in New York, with Syracuse winning 16–5. Penn handed Cornell its second loss, 7–0. Notre Dame lost at Nebraska, 17–0, in the Four Horsemen's first collegiate loss. Texas A&M and Texas, both 6–1–1, met, with A&M winning 28–0. Alabama beat Georgia 27–0 in Birmingham to close the regular season with nine wins, and no losses or ties. In those nine games, the Crimson Tide had outscored its opponents 277–7. Tulane closed its season with a 14–0 at Centenary College and finished unbeaten, with one tie (9–0–1).
- On November 28, Washington closed its season unbeaten with a 15–14 win over Oregon, and elected to meet Alabama in the Rose Bowl. At Providence, Colgate and Brown played to a 14–14 tie. In the Army–Navy Game, Army closed its season with a 10–3 win.

== Rose Bowl ==
The 1926 Rose Bowl pairing of Alabama and Washington later became the subject of a television documentary, Roses of Crimson, and hailed as "the football game that changed the South". Alabama was the first Southern football team to be invited to play in the Rose Bowl, and proved that the Southern teams could compete with those from the East, the Midwest, and the West Coast. George Wilson helped the Huskies take a 12–0 lead at halftime, but both extra point attempts failed, and Wilson was injured. In the third quarter, Alabama exploded for three touchdowns, starting with quarterback Pooley Hubert's run to make the score 12–7. Washington lost the ball on its 35-yard line, and Johnny Mack Brown carried the ball over to make the score 14–12 in favor of Alabama. A 61-yard pass from Hubert to Brown set up Alabama's third score for a 20–12 lead. George Wilson returned in the fourth quarter, and the Huskies scored a touchdown and the point after to close the score to 20–19, but the missed conversion attempts from the first half cost them the game. The victory for Coach Wallace Wade established Alabama as a football powerhouse.

== Conference standings ==
=== Major conference standings ===
1925 Big Ten Conference football standings
	Conf.					Overall
Team	W		L		T	W		L		T
No. 2 Michigan $	5	–	1	–	0	7	–	1	–	0
Northwestern	3	–	1	–	0	5	–	3	–	0
No. 8 Wisconsin	3	–	1	–	1	6	–	1	–	1
Chicago	2	–	2	–	1	3	–	4	–	1
Illinois	2	–	2	–	0	5	–	3	–	0
Iowa	2	–	2	–	0	5	–	3	–	0
Minnesota	1	–	1	–	1	5	–	2	–	1
Ohio State	1	–	3	–	1	4	–	3	–	1
Indiana	0	–	3	–	1	3	–	4	–	1
Purdue	0	–	3	–	1	3	–	4	–	1
$ – Conference champion; Rankings from Dickinson System

1925 Missouri Valley Conference football standings
	Conf.					Overall
Team	W		L		T	W		L		T
No. 5 Missouri $	5	–	1	–	0	6	–	1	–	1
Drake	5	–	2	–	0	5	–	3	–	0
Kansas State	3	–	2	–	1	5	–	2	–	1
Iowa State	3	–	2	–	1	4	–	3	–	1
Nebraska	2	–	2	–	1	4	–	2	–	2
Oklahoma	3	–	3	–	1	4	–	3	–	1
Grinnell	2	–	2	–	1	3	–	3	–	2
Kansas	2	–	5	–	1	2	–	5	–	1
Washington University	1	–	4	–	1	2	–	5	–	1
Oklahoma A&M	0	–	3	–	1	2	–	5	–	1
$ – Conference champion; Rankings from Dickinson System

1925 Northwest Conference football standings
	Conf.					Overall
Team	W		L		T	W		L		T
Oregon Agricultural +	7	–	0	–	0	7	–	2	–	0
Washington +	5	–	0	–	0	10	–	1	–	1
Gonzaga	2	–	1	–	2	7	–	2	–	2
Whitman	2	–	3	–	0	4	–	3	–	0
Idaho	2	–	3	–	0	3	–	5	–	0
Montana	1	–	3	–	1	3	–	4	–	1
Washington State	1	–	3	–	1	3	–	4	–	1
Pacific (OR)	1	–	3	–	0	3	–	5	–	1
Oregon	1	–	3	–	0	1	–	5	–	1
Willamette	0	–	4	–	0	2	–	7	–	0
+ – Conference co-champions

1925 Pacific Coast Conference football standings
	Conf.					Overall
Team	W		L		T	W		L		T
No. 7 Washington $	5	–	0	–	0	10	–	1	–	1
No. 8 Stanford	4	–	1	–	0	7	–	2	–	0
USC	3	–	2	–	0	11	–	2	–	0
Oregon Agricultural	3	–	2	–	0	7	–	2	–	0
California	2	–	2	–	0	6	–	3	–	0
Idaho	2	–	3	–	0	3	–	5	–	0
Washington State	2	–	3	–	0	3	–	4	–	1
Montana	1	–	4	–	0	3	–	4	–	1
Oregon	0	–	5	–	0	1	–	5	–	1
$ – Conference champion; Rankings from Dickinson System

1925 Rocky Mountain Conference football standings
	Conf.					Overall
Team	W		L		T	W		L		T
Colorado Agricultural $	8	–	0	–	0	9	–	1	–	0
Utah Agricultural	5	–	1	–	0	6	–	1	–	0
Utah	5	–	1	–	0	6	–	2	–	0
Colorado	5	–	2	–	0	6	–	3	–	0
Wyoming	4	–	3	–	0	6	–	3	–	0
BYU	3	–	3	–	0	3	–	3	–	0
Colorado College	4	–	4	–	0	5	–	4	–	1
Western State (CO)	2	–	4	–	0	3	–	4	–	0
Colorado Mines	2	–	6	–	0	2	–	7	–	0
Montana State	1	–	4	–	0	6	–	5	–	0
Denver	1	–	6	–	0	1	–	6	–	0
Colorado Teachers	0	–	6	–	0	2	–	6	–	1
$ – Conference champion

1925 Southern Conference football standings
	Conf.					Overall
Team	W		L		T	W		L		T
No. 2 Alabama +	7	–	0	–	0	10	–	0	–	0
No. 6 Tulane +	5	–	0	–	0	9	–	0	–	1
North Carolina	4	–	0	–	1	7	–	1	–	1
Washington and Lee	5	–	1	–	0	5	–	5	–	0
Virginia	4	–	1	–	1	7	–	1	–	1
Georgia Tech	4	–	1	–	1	6	–	2	–	1
Kentucky	4	–	2	–	0	6	–	3	–	0
Florida	3	–	2	–	0	8	–	2	–	0
Auburn	3	–	2	–	1	5	–	3	–	1
VPI	3	–	3	–	1	5	–	3	–	2
Vanderbilt	3	–	3	–	0	6	–	3	–	0
Tennessee	2	–	2	–	1	5	–	2	–	1
South Carolina	2	–	2	–	0	7	–	3	–	0
Georgia	2	–	4	–	0	4	–	5	–	0
Sewanee	1	–	4	–	0	4	–	4	–	1
Mississippi A&M	1	–	4	–	0	3	–	4	–	1
VMI	1	–	5	–	0	5	–	5	–	0
LSU	0	–	2	–	1	5	–	3	–	1
NC State	0	–	4	–	1	3	–	5	–	1
Ole Miss	0	–	4	–	0	5	–	5	–	0
Clemson	0	–	4	–	0	1	–	7	–	0
Maryland	0	–	4	–	0	2	–	5	–	1
+ – Conference co-champions; Rankings from Dickinson System

1925 Southwest Conference football standings
	Conf.					Overall
Team	W		L		T	W		L		T
Texas A&M $	4	–	1	–	0	7	–	1	–	1
TCU	2	–	0	–	1	7	–	1	–	1
Texas	2	–	1	–	1	6	–	2	–	1
SMU	1	–	1	–	2	5	–	2	–	2
Rice	1	–	2	–	1	4	–	4	–	1
Arkansas	1	–	2	–	1	4	–	4	–	1
Baylor	0	–	3	–	2	3	–	5	–	2
$ – Conference champion

=== Independents ===
1925 Eastern college football independents records
	Conf.			Overall
Team	W	L	T	W		L		T
No. 1 Dartmouth		–		8	–	0	–	0
Fordham		–		9	–	1	–	0
No. 4 Colgate		–		7	–	0	–	2
No. 10 Pittsburgh		–		8	–	1	–	0
Syracuse		–		8	–	1	–	1
No. 11 Lafayette		–		7	–	1	–	1
Springfield		–		6	–	1	–	1
Princeton		–		5	–	1	–	1
Holy Cross		–		8	–	2	–	0
Penn		–		7	–	2	–	0
Army		–		7	–	2	–	0
Boston College		–		6	–	2	–	0
Cornell		–		6	–	2	–	0
NYU		–		6	–	2	–	1
Villanova		–		6	–	2	–	1
Washington & Jefferson		–		6	–	2	–	1
Carnegie Tech		–		5	–	2	–	1
Yale		–		5	–	2	–	1
Bucknell		–		7	–	3	–	1
Columbia		–		6	–	3	–	1
Muhlenberg		–		6	–	3	–	1
Temple		–		5	–	2	–	2
Harvard		–		4	–	3	–	1
Franklin & Marshall		–		5	–	4	–	0
Brown		–		5	–	4	–	1
Penn State		–		4	–	4	–	1
Buffalo		–		3	–	4	–	1
St. John's		–		3	–	4	–	0
Lehigh		–		3	–	5	–	1
Vermont		–		3	–	6	–	0
CCNY		–		2	–	5	–	0
Providence		–		2	–	7	–	0
Rutgers		–		2	–	7	–	0
Boston University		–		1	–	5	–	0
Manhattan		–		1	–	6	–	1
Tufts		–		1	–	6	–	0
Drexel		–		1	–	7	–	0
Rankings from Dickinson System

1925 Midwestern college football independents records
	Conf.			Overall
Team	W	L	T	W		L		T
Northern Illinois State		–		6	–	1	–	0
Dayton		–		7	–	2	–	0
Marquette		–		7	–	2	–	0
Notre Dame		–		7	–	2	–	1
Haskell		–		9	–	3	–	1
Western State Normal		–		6	–	2	–	1
Loyola (IL)		–		6	–	2	–	0
Central Michigan		–		4	–	1	–	3
Adrian		–		6	–	3	–	0
Butler		–		5	–	2	–	2
Michigan Mines		–		2	–	1	–	0
Detroit City College		–		4	–	3	–	1
Detroit		–		5	–	4	–	0
Assumption (ON)		–		3	–	3	–	1
Kent State		–		1	–	1	–	3
Michigan State		–		3	–	5	–	0
Muncie Normal		–		2	–	5	–	0
John Carroll		–		2	–	6	–	1
Saint Louis		–		2	–	6	–	1
Valparaiso		–		1	–	6	–	0

1925 Southern college football independents records
	Conf.			Overall
Team	W	L	T	W		L		T
Louisville		–		8	–	0	–	0
Georgetown		–		9	–	1	–	0
Howard		–		6	–	0	–	2
Tennessee State		–		4	–	1	–	0
Texas Mines		–		5	–	1	–	1
Texas Tech		–		6	–	1	–	2
Stetson		–		6	–	2	–	1
Wake Forest		–		6	–	2	–	1
Davidson		–		6	–	2	–	2
George Washington		–		6	–	2	–	2
Navy		–		5	–	2	–	1
Texas A&I		–		4	–	2	–	1
William & Mary		–		6	–	4	–	0
Catholic University		–		4	–	4	–	0
Delaware		–		4	–	4	–	0
Spring Hill		–		4	–	4	–	0
Tennessee Docs		–		5	–	5	–	0
Duke		–		4	–	5	–	0
Middle Tennessee State Teachers		–		3	–	4	–	2
East Tennessee State Teachers		–		3	–	4	–	0
Western Kentucky State Normal		–		3	–	5	–	1
Georgia Normal		–		1	–	2	–	0
Richmond		–		3	–	6	–	0
Loyola (MD)		–		2	–	6	–	0
Delaware State		–		0	–	2	–	0
Mississippi State Teachers		–		0	–	6	–	0
West Tennessee State Teachers		–		0	–	7	–	1

1925 Western college football independents records
	Conf.			Overall
Team	W	L	T	W		L		T
Hawaii		–		10	–	0	–	0
Tempe State		–		6	–	2	–	0
Loyola (CA)		–		4	–	2	–	0
New Mexico A&M		–		5	–	3	–	1
San Diego State		–		5	–	3	–	1
La Verne		–		5	–	4	–	0
Arizona		–		3	–	3	–	1
Santa Barbara State		–		3	–	4	–	1
Regis		–		2	–	3	–	0
New Mexico		–		2	–	4	–	1
St. Ignatius (CA)		–		2	–	4	–	1
Santa Clara		–		2	–	6	–	0
Humboldt State		–		1	–	3	–	0

=== Minor conferences ===
Conference	Champion(s)	Record
Central Intercollegiate Athletics Association	Hampton Institute	3–2–1
Far Western Conference	Saint Mary's (CA)	3–0
Inter-Normal Athletic Conference of Wisconsin	River Falls Normal	4–0
Iowa Intercollegiate Athletic Conference	Simpson; Upper Iowa	5–1
Kansas Collegiate Athletic Conference	Bethany; College of Emporia	7–0
Louisiana Intercollegiate Athletic Association	Southwestern Louisiana	5–0
Michigan Intercollegiate Athletic Association	Michigan State Normal	5–0
Midwest Collegiate Athletic Conference	Beloit; Carleton; Cornell College; Monmouth (IL)	3–0; 1–0; 3–0–1; 1–0–1
Minnesota Intercollegiate Athletic Conference	Macalester	3–0
Missouri Intercollegiate Athletic Association	Northwest Missouri State Teachers	3–0–1
North Central Intercollegiate Conference	Creighton; Nebraska Wesleyan; North Dakota Agricultural	3–0–1; 3–0–1; 3–0–2
Nebraska Intercollegiate Conference	Nebraska State Teachers–Chadron	6–0
Ohio Athletic Conference	Ohio Wesleyan	7–0
Oklahoma Intercollegiate Conference	Tulsa	4–0
South Dakota Intercollegiate Conference	Northern Normal and Industrial; Yankton	5–0; 4–0–1
Southern California Intercollegiate Athletic Conference	Occidental	5–0
Southern Intercollegiate Athletic Conference	Tuskegee	—
Southwestern Athletic Conference	Bishop (TX)	4–1
Texas Intercollegiate Athletic Association	Southwestern	4–0–1
Tri-Normal Conference	Cheney Normal	2–0

=== Minor conference standings ===
1925 California Coast Conference football standings
	Conf.					Overall
Team	W		L		T	W		L		T
Chico State $	5	–	0	–	0	7	–	1	–	0
San Mateo			–					–
Modesto	3	–	3	–	0	3	–	6	–	1
Cal Poly	1	–	2	–	0	4	–	5	–	0
San Jose State	2	–	4	–	0	2	–	5	–	0
Bakersfield	0	–	1	–	0	0	–	1	–	0
Sacramento			–					–
Santa Rosa			–					–
$ – Conference champion; Includes forfeit by San Mateo to Chico State

1925 Colored Intercollegiate Athletic Association football standings
	Conf.					Overall
Team	W		L		T	W		L		T
Hampton $	4	–	1	–	1	4	–	1	–	1
Virginia Seminary	3	–	1	–	1	4	–	1	–	2
Virginia Union	3	–	3	–	0	3	–	3	–	0
Virginia Normal	1	–	1	–	3	3	–	1	–	4
Shaw	1	–	2	–	3	2	–	2	–	3
Saint Paul (VA)	1	–	3	–	2	3	–	3	–	2
North Carolina A&T	1	–	3	–	2	4	–	3	–	3
$ – Conference champion

1925 Columbia Valley Conference football standings
	Conf.					Overall
Team	W		L		T	W		L		T
Cheney Normal $	3	–	0	–	0	6	–	3	–	0
Spokane College	2	–	1	–	0	?	–	?	–	?
Whitworth	1	–	2	–	0	?	–	?	–	?
Spokane University	0	–	3	–	0	?	–	?	–	?
$ – Conference champion

1925 Far Western Conference football standings
	Conf.					Overall
Team	W		L		T	W		L		T
Saint Mary's $	3	–	0	–	0	8	–	2	–	0
Nevada	3	–	1	–	0	4	–	3	–	1
Cal Aggies	2	–	2	–	0	5	–	3	–	0
Pacific (CA)	1	–	2	–	0	5	–	2	–	0
Fresno State	0	–	4	–	0	2	–	6	–	1
$ – Conference champion

1925 Illinois Intercollegiate Athletic Conference football standings
	Conf.					Overall
Team	W		L		T	W		L		T
Bradley +	5	–	0	–	0	9	–	0	–	0
Monmouth (IL) +	6	–	0	–	1	7	–	0	–	2
Millikin	5	–	0	–	1	6	–	1	–	1
McKendree	5	–	1	–	0	5	–	3	–	1
Lake Forest	2	–	1	–	0	5	–	2	–	0
Knox (IL)	2	–	1	–	0	2	–	6	–	0
St. Viator	3	–	2	–	0	5	–	3	–	1
Carthage	3	–	2	–	1	4	–	4	–	1
Augustana (IL)	4	–	3	–	1	4	–	3	–	1
Western Illinois	4	–	3	–	1	4	–	3	–	1
Eureka	5	–	4	–	0	5	–	4	–	0
Hedding	1	–	1	–	0	2	–	2	–	1
Shurtleff	3	–	4	–	1	4	–	5	–	1
Eastern Illinois	1	–	2	–	0	4	–	3	–	1
Illinois College	2	–	4	–	3	3	–	4	–	3
Lincoln (IL)	2	–	4	–	1	2	–	5	–	1
Mount Morris	1	–	2	–	0	2	–	5	–	0
Wheaton (IL)	1	–	5	–	0	1	–	7	–	0
Illinois State Normal	1	–	6	–	0	1	–	6	–	0
Illinois Wesleyan	0	–	5	–	1	1	–	6	–	1
Southern Illinois	0	–	2	–	0	0	–	5	–	1
Blackburn	0	–	2	–	0	0	–	3	–	0
North-Western College	0	–	6	–	0	1	–	6	–	0
$ – Conference champion

1925 Iowa Conference football standings
	Conf.					Overall
Team	W		L		T	W		L		T
Buena Vista	1	–	0	–	0	8	–	1	–	0
Upper Iowa +	5	–	1	–	0	5	–	1	–	1
Simpson (IA) +	5	–	1	–	0	6	–	2	–	1
Iowa State Teachers	4	–	1	–	1	5	–	1	–	2
Parsons	2	–	1	–	1	4	–	2	–	1
Penn (IA)	2	–	1	–	2	4	–	2	–	2
St. Ambrose	3	–	2	–	0	5	–	3	–	1
Western Union	2	–	2	–	0	3	–	4	–	0
Morningside	1	–	1	–	0	3	–	5	–	0
Central (IA)	1	–	2	–	1	2	–	3	–	1
Iowa Wesleyan	1	–	4	–	0	3	–	5	–	0
Luther	0	–	2	–	0	3	–	4	–	0
Des Moines	0	–	4	–	1	0	–	7	–	1
Ellsworth	0	–	5	–	0	0	–	7	–	0
+ – Conference co-champions

1925 Kansas Collegiate Athletic Conference football standings
	Conf.					Overall
Team	W		L		T	W		L		T
College of Emporia +	7	–	0	–	0	7	–	0	–	0
Bethany (KS) +	7	–	0	–	0	7	–	0	–	0
Fairmount	3	–	0	–	4	3	–	1	–	4
Pittsburg Teachers	5	–	2	–	0	5	–	2	–	1
Emporia Teachers	3	–	2	–	1	4	–	3	–	1
Kansas Wesleyan	3	–	2	–	1	4	–	2	–	1
Southwestern (KS)	4	–	3	–	0	5	–	3	–	0
Baker	3	–	3	–	1	4	–	3	–	1
St. Mary's (KS)	3	–	3	–	1	4	–	3	–	1
Washburn	2	–	4	–	1	2	–	4	–	1
Bethel (KS)	1	–	4	–	0	2	–	4	–	0
Hays Teachers	1	–	4	–	1	2	–	4	–	1
Ottawa	1	–	4	–	2	1	–	5	–	2
Friends	1	–	5	–	1	2	–	5	–	1
Sterling	1	–	5	–	1	1	–	5	–	1
McPherson	0	–	4	–	2	1	–	4	–	2
+ – Conference co-champions

1925 Michigan Intercollegiate Athletic Association football standings
	Conf.					Overall
Team	W		L		T	W		L		T
Michigan State Normal $	5	–	0	–	0	8	–	0	–	0
Albion	3	–	1	–	1	3	–	4	–	2
Kalamazoo	2	–	2	–	1	5	–	2	–	1
Alma	2	–	3	–	0	4	–	4	–	0
Hillsdale	2	–	3	–	0	3	–	4	–	1
Olivet	0	–	5	–	0	0	–	6	–	1
$ – Conference champion

1925 Midwest Conference football standings
	Conf.					Overall
Team	W		L		T	W		L		T
Monmouth (IL) +	1	–	0	–	1	7	–	0	–	2
Carleton +	1	–	0	–	0	6	–	1	–	0
Cornell (IA) +	3	–	0	–	1	6	–	0	–	2
Beloit +	3	–	0	–	0	6	–	2	–	0
Lawrence	2	–	1	–	0	4	–	3	–	0
Coe	2	–	2	–	0	3	–	5	–	0
Ripon	0	–	3	–	0	2	–	5	–	0
Hamline	0	–	3	–	0	2	–	6	–	0
Knox	0	–	3	–	0	2	–	6	–	0
+ – Conference co-champions

1925 Minnesota Intercollegiate Athletic Conference football standings
	Conf.					Overall
Team	W		L		T	W		L		T
Macalester $	4	–	0	–	0	4	–	2	–	1
Gustavus Adolphus	3	–	1	–	0	5	–	1	–	0
St. Olaf	3	–	2	–	0	4	–	5	–	0
Concordia (MN)	1	–	2	–	0	2	–	2	–	1
Hamline	1	–	2	–	0	2	–	6	–	0
Saint John's (MN)	0	–	5	–	0	0	–	6	–	0
$ – Conference champion

1925 Missouri College Athletic Union football standings
	Conf.					Overall
Team	W		L		T	W		L		T
Missouri Wesleyan $	5	–	0	–	0	6	–	2	–	0
Missouri Mines	1	–	0	–	0	5	–	2	–	1
William Jewell	6	–	1	–	0	6	–	2	–	0
Westminster (MO)	5	–	2	–	0	5	–	2	–	0
Culver–Stockton	2	–	2	–	0	5	–	4	–	0
Missouri Valley	2	–	3	–	1	3	–	3	–	1
Central Wesleyan	1	–	2	–	0	4	–	3	–	0
Drury	1	–	3	–	0	2	–	5	–	0
Central (MO)	0	–	5	–	1	1	–	6	–	1
Tarkio	0	–	5	–	0	1	–	7	–	0
$ – Conference champion

1925 Missouri Intercollegiate Athletic Association football standings
	Conf.					Overall
Team	W		L		T	W		L		T
Maryville (MO) $	3	–	0	–	1	7	–	0	–	1
Springfield (MO)	2	–	1	–	1	4	–	2	–	2
Kirksville	1	–	2	–	1	6	–	2	–	1
Warrensburg	1	–	2	–	1	4	–	4	–	1
Cape Girardeau	1	–	3	–	0	3	–	3	–	2
$ – Conference champion

1925 Nebraska College Athletic Conference football standings
	Conf.					Overall
Team	W		L		T	W		L		T
Chadron Normal $	6	–	0	–	0	9	–	0	–	0
Peru Normal	6	–	1	–	0	6	–	3	–	1
Midland	6	–	1	–	0	6	–	4	–	0
Omaha	2	–	1	–	1	3	–	3	–	1
Doane	5	–	3	–	0	5	–	3	–	0
Kearney Normal	4	–	3	–	0	4	–	5	–	0
Wayne Normal	3	–	3	–	0	4	–	4	–	0
Cotner	2	–	5	–	0	3	–	5	–	0
Hastings	1	–	4	–	1	1	–	5	–	1
Grand Island	1	–	4	–	3	1	–	4	–	3
Nebraska Central	1	–	5	–	1	1	–	5	–	1
York (NE)	0	–	7	–	0	0	–	7	–	0
$ – Conference champion

1925 New England Conference football standings
	Conf.					Overall
Team	W		L		T	W		L		T
New Hampshire $	2	–	0	–	1	4	–	1	–	2
Maine	1	–	0	–	1	5	–	2	–	1
Massachusetts	1	–	0	–	0	6	–	2	–	0
Rhode Island State	0	–	1	–	1	2	–	5	–	1
Connecticut	0	–	3	–	1	3	–	5	–	1
$ – Conference champion

1925 North Central Conference football standings
	Conf.					Overall
Team	W		L		T	W		L		T
Nebraska Wesleyan +	3	–	0	–	1	6	–	0	–	2
Creighton +	3	–	0	–	1	6	–	3	–	1
North Dakota Agricultural +	4	–	0	–	2	5	–	0	–	2
North Dakota	2	–	2	–	0	4	–	4	–	0
South Dakota State	1	–	1	–	2	2	–	3	–	2
Morningside	2	–	4	–	0	3	–	5	–	0
South Dakota	1	–	4	–	0	3	–	5	–	0
Des Moines	0	–	4	–	0	0	–	7	–	1
+ – Conference co-champions

1925 Northwest Ohio League football standings
	Conf.					Overall
Team	W		L		T	W		L		T
Bowling Green	2	–	0	–	1	3	–	1	–	3
Toledo	1	–	0	–	0	1	–	8	–	0
Findlay	2	–	1	–	1	5	–	2	–	2
Bluffton	1	–	2	–	0	1	–	3	–	0
Defiance	0	–	3	–	0	0	–	6	–	2
$ – Conference champion

1925 Ohio Athletic Conference football standings
	Conf.					Overall
Team	W		L		T	W		L		T
Ohio Wesleyan $	6	–	0	–	0	7	–	1	–	1
Oberlin	5	–	0	–	1	7	–	0	–	1
Wooster	5	–	1	–	0	6	–	2	–	0
Kenyon	5	–	2	–	0	6	–	2	–	0
St. Xavier	3	–	1	–	1	5	–	2	–	1
Mount Union	4	–	2	–	1	7	–	2	–	1
Baldwin–Wallace	5	–	3	–	0	5	–	3	–	0
Ohio	3	–	2	–	0	6	–	2	–	0
Miami (OH)	3	–	2	–	0	5	–	3	–	0
Muskingum	3	–	3	–	0	4	–	3	–	1
Case	3	–	4	–	2	3	–	4	–	2
Denison	3	–	4	–	0	4	–	4	–	1
Heidelberg	3	–	4	–	0	4	–	4	–	0
Cincinnati	2	–	3	–	0	4	–	5	–	0
Wittenberg	3	–	5	–	1	3	–	5	–	1
Ohio Northern	2	–	4	–	1	3	–	4	–	1
Western Reserve	2	–	5	–	0	3	–	6	–	0
Hiram	0	–	5	–	2	0	–	5	–	3
Akron	1	–	6	–	0	1	–	7	–	0
Otterbein	0	–	5	–	1	0	–	6	–	2
$ – Conference champion

1925 Oklahoma Intercollegiate Conference football standings
	Conf.					Overall
Team	W		L		T	W		L		T
Tulsa $	4	–	0	–	0	6	–	2	–	0
Oklahoma Baptist	6	–	1	–	0	8	–	1	–	0
Central State Teachers	4	–	1	–	1	4	–	3	–	2
Southwestern State	3	–	1	–	1	5	–	4	–	1
Northwestern Oklahoma State	2	–	2	–	0	5	–	4	–	0
Northeastern State	2	–	3	–	2	2	–	6	–	2
Oklahoma City	3	–	5	–	0	4	–	6	–	0
East Central	2	–	4	–	1	3	–	5	–	1
Phillips	1	–	6	–	0	1	–	8	–	0
Southeastern Oklahoma State	0	–	4	–	1	2	–	4	–	2
$ – Conference champion

1925 South Dakota Intercollegiate Conference football standings
	Conf.					Overall
Team	W		L		T	W		L		T
Northern Normal +	5	–	0	–	0	7	–	1	–	0
Yankton +	4	–	0	–	1	4	–	3	–	2
Columbus (SD)	4	–	1	–	0	5	–	2	–	0
Southern Normal	4	–	2	–	1	7	–	2	–	1
Eastern Normal	4	–	3	–	0	4	–	3	–	0
South Dakota Mines	2	–	2	–	0	3	–	6	–	0
Augustana (SD)	3	–	4	–	0	4	–	4	–	0
Dakota Wesleyan	1	–	2	–	1	3	–	4	–	1
Huron	1	–	4	–	2	1	–	4	–	3
Spearfish	0	–	4	–	1	2	–	6	–	1
Sioux Falls	0	–	6	–	0	0	–	6	–	0
+ – Conference co-champions; Sioux Falls forfeited games to Yankton, Columbus, Eastern Normal, Southern Normal, Augustana (SD), and Huron. South Dakota Mines and Spearfish played twice. The second game was not counted in the conference standings.

1925 Southern California Conference football standings
	Conf.					Overall
Team	W		L		T	W		L		T
Occidental $	4	–	1	–	0	6	–	3	–	0
Southern Branch	3	–	1	–	1	5	–	3	–	1
Whittier	2	–	2	–	0	3	–	5	–	0
Caltech	1	–	2	–	1	2	–	6	–	1
Pomona	1	–	3	–	1	1	–	5	–	1
Redlands	1	–	3	–	1	3	–	5	–	1
$ – Conference champion

1925 Southern Intercollegiate Athletic Association football standings
	Conf.					Overall
Team	W		L		T	W		L		T
Oglethorpe $	8	–	1	–	0	8	–	3	–	0
SW Louisiana	3	–	0	–	0	7	–	2	–	0
Centenary	2	–	0	–	0	6	–	2	–	0
Millsaps	4	–	1	–	0	5	–	4	–	0
Furman	3	–	1	–	0	7	–	3	–	0
Birmingham–Southern	3	–	1	–	1	7	–	3	–	1
The Citadel	5	–	2	–	0	6	–	4	–	0
Howard (AL)	4	–	2	–	0	6	–	3	–	0
Newberry	3	–	2	–	0	5	–	3	–	0
Mercer	3	–	2	–	0	3	–	6	–	0
Centre	1	–	1	–	0	3	–	6	–	0
Union (TN)	1	–	1	–	0	5	–	4	–	0
Chattanooga	2	–	3	–	0	4	–	4	–	0
Presbyterian	2	–	4	–	0	3	–	6	–	0
Louisiana Tech	1	–	2	–	1	1	–	6	–	1
Wofford	1	–	3	–	0	3	–	7	–	0
Loyola (LA)	1	–	3	–	0	2	–	7	–	0
Mississippi College	1	–	5	–	1	1	–	7	–	1
Louisiana College	0	–	3	–	1	2	–	6	–	1
Georgetown (KY)	0	–	2	–	0	1	–	7	–	0
Rollins	0	–	3	–	0	0	–	7	–	0
Erskine	0	–	4	–	0	1	–	6	–	0
$ – Conference champion

1925 Southwestern Athletic Conference football standings
	Conf.					Overall
Team	W		L		T	W		L		T
Bishop $	4	–	1	–	0	5	–	1	–	0
Wiley	3	–	1	–	1	5	–	1	–	1
Prairie View	3	–	2	–	0	6	–	3	–	0
Paul Quinn	2	–	2	–	1	4	–	2	–	1
Samuel Huston	1	–	3	–	1	2	–	4	–	1
Texas College	0	–	4	–	1	0	–	4	–	1
$ – Conference champion

1925 Texas Intercollegiate Athletic Association football standings
	Conf.					Overall
Team	W		L		T	W		L		T
Southwestern (TX) $	4	–	0	–	1	5	–	3	–	1
Simmons (TX)	6	–	1	–	0	7	–	2	–	0
Howard Payne	4	–	1	–	1	5	–	3	–	1
Trinity (TX)	4	–	2	–	0	9	–	3	–	0
North Texas State Teachers	4	–	2	–	0	6	–	4	–	0
Abilene Christian	2	–	1	–	1	2	–	5	–	2
Austin	2	–	3	–	0	4	–	4	–	1
Sam Houston State	1	–	2	–	0	5	–	4	–	0
East Texas State	2	–	4	–	0	2	–	8	–	0
West Texas State	1	–	3	–	0	4	–	4	–	0
St. Edward's	1	–	3	–	1	3	–	4	–	1
Southwest Texas State	1	–	6	–	0	2	–	6	–	0
Daniel Baker	0	–	4	–	2	2	–	6	–	2
$ – Conference champion

1925 Tri-Normal Conference football standings
	Conf.					Overall
Team	W		L		T	W		L		T
Cheney Normal $	2	–	0	–	0	6	–	3	–	0
Bellingham Normal	1	–	1	–	0	5	–	2	–	0
Ellensburg Normal	0	–	2	–	0	2	–	4	–	0
$ – Conference champion

1925 Tri-State Conference football standings
	Conf.					Overall
Team	W		L		T	W		L		T
Geneva $	5	–	0	–	0	6	–	3	–	0
Waynesburg	2	–	1	–	1	3	–	5	–	1
Thiel	3	–	2	–	0	4	–	5	–	0
Bethany (WV)	2	–	2	–	1	3	–	4	–	1
Westminster (PA)	1	–	4	–	0	2	–	6	–	0
Duquesne	0	–	4	–	0	0	–	7	–	0
$ – Conference champion

1925 West Virginia Athletic Conference football standings
	Conf.					Overall
Team	W		L		T	W		L		T
Marshall $	3	–	0	–	2	4	–	1	–	4
New River State	3	–	1	–	1	5	–	1	–	2
West Virginia Wesleyan	3	–	1	–	0	5	–	3	–	0
Davis & Elkins	4	–	2	–	0	7	–	3	–	0
Salem	4	–	2	–	1	5	–	2	–	2
Fairmont State	1	–	1	–	3	7	–	1	–	2
Potomac State	1	–	1	–	2	1	–	2	–	2
Broaddus	2	–	3	–	1	2	–	5	–	1
West Liberty State	1	–	3	–	0	1	–	6	–	1
Glenville State	0	–	5	–	1	0	–	6	–	1
West Virginia *	2	–	0	–	0	8	–	1	–	0
Concord *	1	–	2	–	0	4	–	3	–	1
Shepherd *	0	–	1	–	1	4	–	2	–	1
Morris Harvey *	0	–	3	–	0	1	–	6	–	0
$ – Conference champion; * – Did not qualify for conference standings Ties did not count in conference standings.

1925 Western Interstate Conference football standings
	Conf.					Overall
Team	W		L		T	W		L		T
Lombard	1	–	0	–	0	3	–	5	–	0
Columbia (IA)	3	–	1	–	1	4	–	3	–	1
DePaul	2	–	1	–	1	4	–	2	–	1
St. Viator	2	–	1	–	1	5	–	3	–	1
Luther	1	–	1	–	0	3	–	4	–	0
La Crosse Normal	0	–	2	–	1	1	–	4	–	2
Valparaiso	0	–	3	–	0	1	–	6	–	0

1925 Wisconsin Normal Athletic Conference football standings
	Conf.					Overall
Team	W		L		T	W		L		T
River Falls Normal $	4	–	0	–	0	5	–	1	–	1
Oshkosh Normal	3	–	0	–	1	5	–	2	–	1
Eau Claire Normal	3	–	1	–	0	4	–	2	–	1
Whitewater Normal	2	–	2	–	0	3	–	3	–	0
La Crosse Normal	1	–	2	–	1	1	–	4	–	2
Milwaukee Normal	1	–	2	–	1	1	–	4	–	1
Stout Normal	1	–	2	–	1	1	–	4	–	1
Superior Normal	1	–	3	–	0	4	–	4	–	0
Stevens Point Normal	1	–	3	–	0	2	–	4	–	1
Platteville Normal	1	–	3	–	0	1	–	5	–	1
$ – Conference champion

== Rankings ==
=== Champions (per rankings) ===
Various different rankings (using differing methodologies) have identified either Alabama, Dartmouth, or Michigan as the season's champion.

- Berryman QPRS: Alabama
- Billingsley Report: Alabama
- Boand System: Alabama
- College Football Researchers Association: Alabama
- Parke H. Davis (Note: for Spalding's Official Foot Ball Guide): Dartmouth
- Dickinson System: Dartmouth
- Helms Athletic Foundation: Alabama
- Houlgate System: Alabama
- National Championship Foundation: Alabama
- Poling System: Alabama
- Sagarin Ratings Elo chess method: Alabama
- Sagarin Ratings Predictor method: Michigan

Note: besides the Dickinson System, all 1925 rankings were given retroactively

=== Dickinson System ranking ===
The Dickinson System ratings were announced by Illinois economics professor Frank G. Dickinson on January 7, 1926, with his final rankings being:

1. Dartmouth (20.00 pts)
2. Michigan and Alabama (both 19.18)
4. Colgate (18.75)
5. Missouri (16.25)
6. Tulane (15.00)
7. Washington (14.75)
8. Wisconsin and Stanford (both 13.75)
10. Pittsburgh (12.50)
11. Lafayette (11.88)

== Awards and honors ==
=== All-Americans ===
The consensus All-America team included:

Position	Name	Height	Weight (lbs.)	Class	Hometown	Team
QB	Benny Friedman	5'8"	172	Jr.	Cleveland, Ohio	Michigan
HB	Andy Oberlander	6'0"	197	Sr.	Chelsea, Massachusetts	Dartmouth
HB	Red Grange	5'11"	175	Sr.	Wheaton, Illinois	Illinois
HB	Wildcat Wilson	5'11"	185	Sr.	Everett, Washington	Washington
FB	Ernie Nevers	6'0"	200	Sr.	Superior, Wisconsin	Stanford
E	Bennie Oosterbaan	6'0"	180	So.	Muskegon, Michigan	Michigan
T	Ed Weir	6'0"	190	Sr.	Superior, Nebraska	Nebraska
G	Carl Diehl	6'1"	205	Sr.	Chicago, Illinois	Dartmouth
C	Ed McMillan	6'0"	208	Sr.	Pittsburgh, Pennsylvania	Princeton
G	Ed Hess	6'1"	190	Jr.	Chardon, Ohio	Ohio State
T	Ralph Chase	6'3"	202	Sr.	Easton, Pennsylvania	Pittsburgh
E	George Tully	5'10"	180	Sr.	Orange, New Jersey	Dartmouth

=== Statistical leaders ===
- Player scoring most points: Peggy Flournoy, Tulane, 128
- Player scoring most touchdowns: Peggy Flournoy, Tulane and Mort Kaer, USC, 19
- Total offense leader: Andy Oberlander, Dartmouth, 1147+
- Passing yards leader: Benny Friedman, Michigan, 760
- Passing touchdowns leader: Andy Oberlander, Dartmouth, 14
- Receiving touchdowns leader: Myles Lane, Dartmouth, 7
