= 1925 Massachusetts Aggies football team =

American college football season

1925 Massachusetts Aggies football
- Conference: New England Conference
- Record: 6–2 (1–0 New England)
- Head coach: Harold Gore (7th season)
- Home stadium: Alumni Field

1925 New England Conference football standings
	Conf.					Overall
Team	W		L		T	W		L		T
New Hampshire $	2	–	0	–	1	4	–	1	–	2
Maine	1	–	0	–	1	5	–	2	–	1
Massachusetts	1	–	0	–	0	6	–	2	–	0
Rhode Island State	0	–	1	–	1	2	–	5	–	1
Connecticut	0	–	3	–	1	3	–	5	–	1
$ – Conference champion

The 1925 Massachusetts Aggies football team represented Massachusetts Agricultural College in the 1925 college football season, competing as a member of the New England Conference. The team was coached by Harold Gore and played its home games at Alumni Field in Amherst, Massachusetts. Massachusetts finished the season with an overall record of 6–2, and a conference record of 1–0.

== Schedule ==
Date	Opponent	Site	Result	Source
October 3	at Bates*	Garcelon Field; Lewiston, ME	W 19–0	
October 10	Norwich*	Alumni Field; Amherst, MA	W 19–0	
October 17	at Connecticut	Gardner Dow Athletic Fields; Storrs, CT (rivalry)	W 13–0	
October 24	Worcester Tech*	Alumni Field; Amherst, MA	W 54–19	
October 31	at Amherst*	Pratt Field; Amherst, MA	L 0–27	
November 14	Lowell Textile*	Alumni Field; Amherst, MA	W 41–7	
November 21	Tufts*	Alumni Field; Amherst, MA	W 6–4	
November 26	at Springfield*	Pratt Field; Springfield, MA	L 13–18	
*Non-conference game
