= George Guttormsen =

American football quarterback

Profile
- Position: Quarterback

Career information
- College: Washington (1925–1926)

Awards and highlights
- Third-team All-American (1926); First-team All-PCC (1926); Second-team All-PCC (1925)

George Guttormsen was a college football player. Guttormsen was a prominent quarterback for the Washington Huskies. He was a letterman at Washington from 1924 to 1926 and captain of the 1926 team. In the 1926 Rose Bowl, Wildcat Wilson threw a touchdown pass to Guttormsen. Guttormsen was an assistant coach at Washington in 1929.
