= 1925 Connecticut Aggies football team =

American college football season

1925 Connecticut Aggies football
- Conference: New England Conference
- Record: 3–5–1 (0–3–1 New England)
- Head coach: Sumner Dole (3rd season)
- Home stadium: Gardner Dow Athletic Fields

1925 New England Conference football standings
	Conf.					Overall
Team	W		L		T	W		L		T
New Hampshire $	2	–	0	–	1	4	–	1	–	2
Maine	1	–	0	–	1	5	–	2	–	1
Massachusetts	1	–	0	–	0	6	–	2	–	0
Rhode Island State	0	–	1	–	1	2	–	5	–	1
Connecticut	0	–	3	–	1	3	–	5	–	1
$ – Conference champion

The 1925 Connecticut Aggies football team was an American football team that represented Connecticut Agricultural College, now known as the University of Connecticut, as a member of the New England Conference (NEC) during the 1925 college football season. In its third season under head coach Sumner Dole, Connecticut compiled a 3–5–1 record, going 0–3–1 against conference opponents.

== Schedule ==
Date	Opponent	Site	Result	Attendance	Source
September 26	at Wesleyan*	Andrus Field; Middletown, CT	W 7–3		
October 3	at NYU*	Ohio Field; Bronx, NY	L 0–23	8,000	
October 10	Maine	Gardner Dow Athletic Fields; Storrs, CT	L 0–7		
October 17	Massachusetts	Gardner Dow Athletic Fields; Storrs, CT (rivalry)	L 0–13		
October 24	at Tufts*	Medford, MA	W 3–0		
October 31	Manhattan*	Gardner Dow Athletic Fields; Storrs, CT	W 19–0		
November 7	vs. New Hampshire	Manchester, NH	L 3–17		
November 14	at Rhode Island State	Kingston, RI (rivalry)	T 0–0		
November 21	at Rensselaer*	Troy, NY	L 7–13		
*Non-conference game; Source:
