= 1925 Rhode Island State Rams football team =

American college football season

1925 Rhode Island State Rams football
- Conference: New England Conference
- Record: 2–5–1 (0–1–1 New England)
- Head coach: Frank Keaney (6th season)

1925 New England Conference football standings
	Conf.					Overall
Team	W		L		T	W		L		T
New Hampshire $	2	–	0	–	1	4	–	1	–	2
Maine	1	–	0	–	1	5	–	2	–	1
Massachusetts	1	–	0	–	0	6	–	2	–	0
Rhode Island State	0	–	1	–	1	2	–	5	–	1
Connecticut	0	–	3	–	1	3	–	5	–	1
$ – Conference champion

The 1925 Rhode Island Rams football team was an American football team that represented the University of Rhode Island as a member of the New England Conference during the 1925 college football season. In its sixth season under head coach Frank Keaney, the team compiled a 2–5–1 record, going 0–1–1 against conference opponents.

== Schedule ==
Date	Opponent	Site	Result	Attendance	Source
September 26	at Brown*	Brown Stadium; Providence, RI (rivalry)	L 0–33		
October 3	at Western Maryland*	Baltimore Stadium; Baltimore, MD	L 0–7		
October 10	Lowell Textile*	Kingston, RI	W 12–0		
October 17	at New Hampshire	Memorial Field; Durham, NH	L 0–26		
October 24	CCNY*	Kingston, RI	W 12–0		
October 31	at Worcester Tech*	Worcester, MA	L 18–26		
November 7	Bates*	Kingston, RI	L 0–13		
November 14	Connecticut^{†}	Kingston, RI (rivalry)	T 0–0		
*Non-conference game; ^{†}Homecoming
