= 1925 New Hampshire football team =

American college football season

1925 New Hampshire football
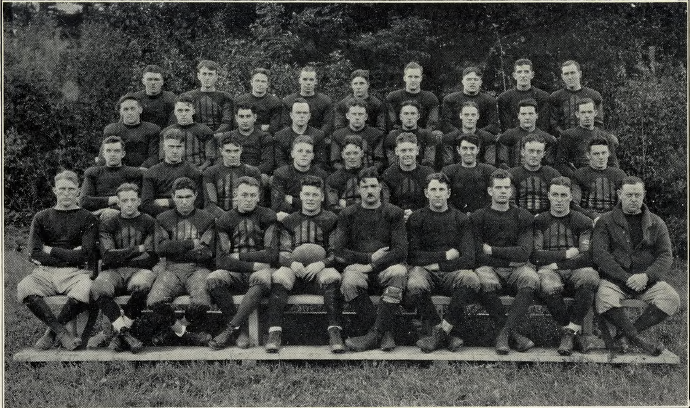

New England Conference champion
- Conference: New England Conference
- Record: 4–1–2 (2–0–1 New England)
- Head coach: Butch Cowell (10th season)
- Captain: Edward O'Connor
- Home stadium: Memorial Field

1925 New England Conference football standings
	Conf.					Overall
Team	W		L		T	W		L		T
New Hampshire $	2	–	0	–	1	4	–	1	–	2
Maine	1	–	0	–	1	5	–	2	–	1
Massachusetts	1	–	0	–	0	6	–	2	–	0
Rhode Island State	0	–	1	–	1	2	–	5	–	1
Connecticut	0	–	3	–	1	3	–	5	–	1
$ – Conference champion

The 1925 New Hampshire football team (Note: The school did not adopt the Wildcats nickname until February 1926; before then, they were generally referred to as "the blue and white".) was an American football team that represented the University of New Hampshire as a member of the New England Conference during the 1925 college football season. In its 10th season under head coach William "Butch" Cowell, (Note: This was Cowell's 11th year and 10th season as head coach, as the school did not field a varsity team in 1918 due to World War I.) the team compiled a 4–1–2 record (2–0–1 against conference opponents), won the conference championship, and outscored opponents by a total of 91 to 59. The team played its home games in Durham, New Hampshire, at Memorial Field. (Note: Memorial Field remains in use by the New Hampshire women's field hockey team.)

== Schedule ==
Date	Opponent	Site	Result	Attendance	Source
October 3	at Norwich*	Sabine Field; Northfield, VT	W 15–2		
October 10	at Colby*	Waterville, ME	—‡		
October 17	Rhode Island	Memorial Field; Durham, NH	W 26–0		
October 24	Springfield*	Memorial Field; Durham, NH	T 10–10		
October 31	Tufts*^{†}	Memorial Field; Durham, NH	W 9–6	5,000	
November 7	vs. Connecticut	Textile Field; Manchester, NH	W 17–3		
November 14	at Maine	Alumni Field; Orono, ME (rivalry)	T 0–0		
November 21	at Brown*	Brown Stadium; Providence, RI	L 14–38		
*Non-conference game; ^{†}Homecoming; Source:

‡ The Colby game was cancelled due to snow.

New Hampshire's 14 points against Brown broke a string of seven consecutive shutouts by the Bears; the Wildcats had last scored on Brown in their first-ever game, in 1905.
