= Earl Clark (American football) =

American football player and coach (1891–1959)

Biographical details
- Born: 1891; Everett, Washington, U.S.
- Died: April 10, 1959 (aged 67); Seattle Washington, U.S.

Playing career
- 1912: Washington
- 1914–1916: Montana
- Position: End

Coaching career (HC unless noted)
- 1923: Everett High School (basketball)
- multiple: Everett High School
- 1924–1925: Montana
- 1926–retirement: Washington (trainer)

Head coaching record
- Overall: 7–8–1

Earl F. "Click" Clark (1891 – April 10, 1959) was an American football player and coach.

== College ==
Clark lettered at the University of Washington in 1912. He then lettered at the University of Montana from 1914 to 1916 as a 152-pound end. At Montana, he was a captain of the football team and an "all-star northwest" end for three seasons, after which he enlisted in the United States Navy in 1917.

== Coaching ==
Clark served as the head coach at the University of Montana from 1924 to 1925, the second alum to do so. He then became a trainer at the University of Washington in 1926 until his retirement.

== Awards ==
- Everett High School Coaches hall of fame.
- Seattle Sports Man of the Year (1941)
- Washington Husky Hall of Fame
- National Athletic Trainers' Association hall of fame

== Head coaching record ==
Year	Team	Overall	Conference	Standing	Bowl/playoffs
Montana Grizzlies (Northwest Conference / Pacific Coast Conference) (1924–1925)
1924	Montana	4–4	2–3 / 0–3	T–5th / T–8th	
1925	Montana	3–4–1	1–3–1 / 1–4	T–6th / 8th	
Montana:		7–8–1	3–8–1		
Total:		7–8–1			
