= 1925 Washington Huskies football team =

American college football season

1925 Washington Huskies football
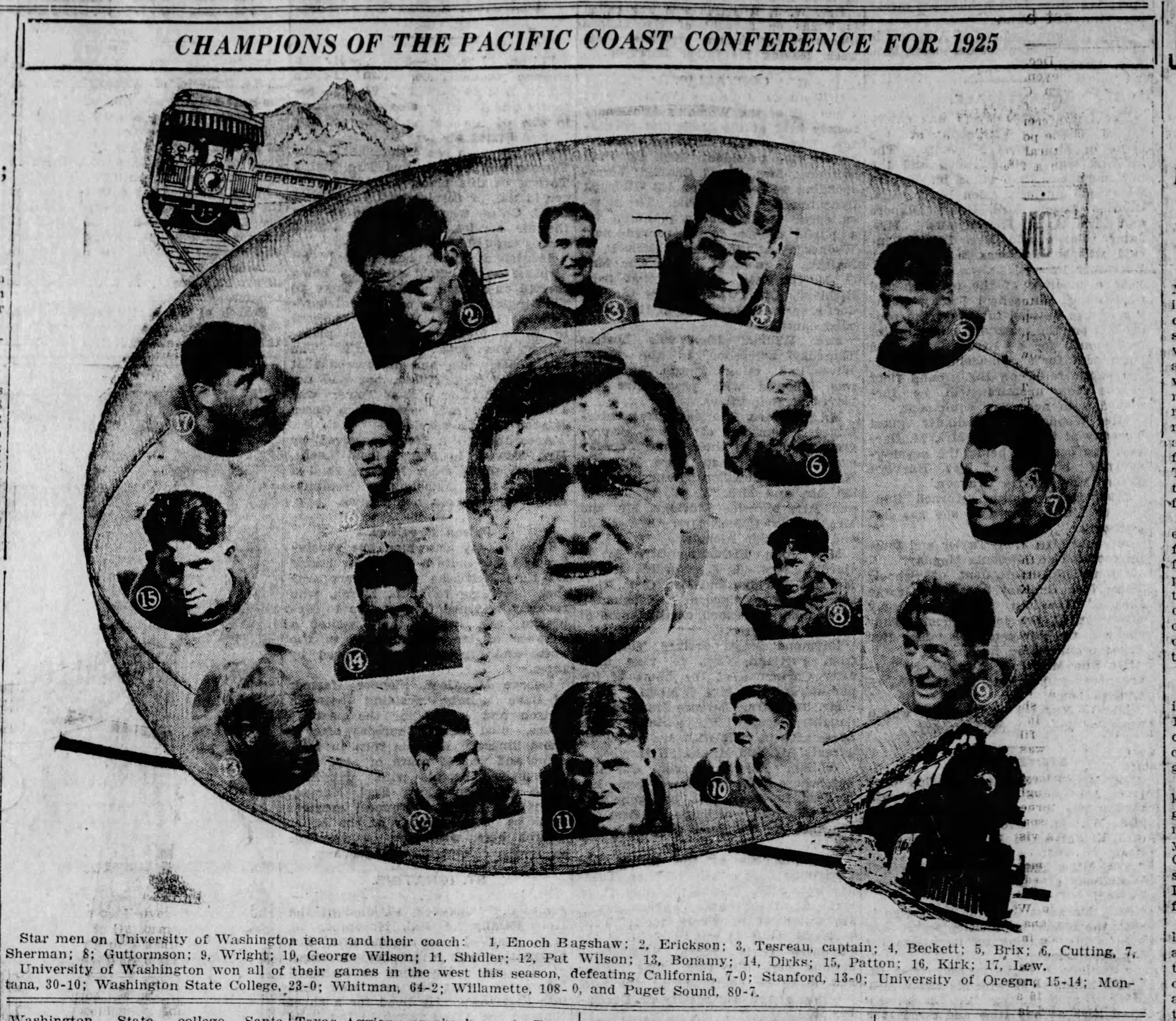

Northwest Conference co-champion PCC champion

Rose Bowl, L 19–20 vs. Alabama
- Conference: Northwest Conference, Pacific Coast Conference
- Record: 10–1–1 (5–0 Northwest, 5–0 PCC)
- Head coach: Enoch Bagshaw (5th season)
- Captain: Elmer Tesreau
- Home stadium: University of Washington Stadium

Uniform
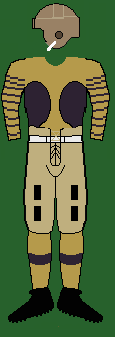

1925 Northwest Conference football standings
	Conf.					Overall
Team	W		L		T	W		L		T
Oregon Agricultural +	7	–	0	–	0	7	–	2	–	0
Washington +	5	–	0	–	0	10	–	1	–	1
Gonzaga	2	–	1	–	2	7	–	2	–	2
Whitman	2	–	3	–	0	4	–	3	–	0
Idaho	2	–	3	–	0	3	–	5	–	0
Montana	1	–	3	–	1	3	–	4	–	1
Washington State	1	–	3	–	1	3	–	4	–	1
Pacific (OR)	1	–	3	–	0	3	–	5	–	1
Oregon	1	–	3	–	0	1	–	5	–	1
Willamette	0	–	4	–	0	2	–	7	–	0
+ – Conference co-champions

1925 Pacific Coast Conference football standings
	Conf.					Overall
Team	W		L		T	W		L		T
No. 7 Washington $	5	–	0	–	0	10	–	1	–	1
No. 8 Stanford	4	–	1	–	0	7	–	2	–	0
USC	3	–	2	–	0	11	–	2	–	0
Oregon Agricultural	3	–	2	–	0	7	–	2	–	0
California	2	–	2	–	0	6	–	3	–	0
Idaho	2	–	3	–	0	3	–	5	–	0
Washington State	2	–	3	–	0	3	–	4	–	1
Montana	1	–	4	–	0	3	–	4	–	1
Oregon	0	–	5	–	0	1	–	5	–	1
$ – Conference champion; Rankings from Dickinson System

The 1925 Washington Huskies football team represented the University of Washington as a member of the Northwest Conference and the Pacific Coast Conference (PCC) during the 1925 college football season. In their fifth season under head coach Enoch Bagshaw, the Huskies compiled an overall record of 10–1–1 record and outscored opponents by a total of 480 to 59. Washington had a record of 5–0 in Northwest Conference play, sharing the conference title with Oregon Agricultural, and 5–0 against PCC opponents, winning the conference championship. The Huskies were invited to the Rose Bowl, where they lost to Alabama. The team was ranked No. 7 in the nation in the Dickinson System ratings released in January 1926.

Fullback Elmer Tesreau was the team captain. Halfback George “Wildcat” Wilson was selected as a consensus first-team player on the 1925 All-America team. Other key players on the team included quarterback George Guttormsen, tackle Walden Erickson, guard Egbert Brix, center Douglas Bonamy, and ends Judson Cutting and Clifford Marker.

== Schedule ==
Date	Opponent	Site	Result	Attendance	Source
September 26	Willamette	University of Washington Stadium; Seattle, WA	W 108–0	3,500	
October 3	USS Oklahoma*	University of Washington Stadium; Seattle, WA	W 59–0	3,000	
October 3	West Seattle Athletic Club*	University of Washington Stadium; Seattle, WA	W 56–0	3,000	
October 10	Montana	University of Washington Stadium; Seattle, WA	W 30–10	20,000	
October 17	at Nebraska*	Memorial Stadium; Lincoln, NE	T 6–6	15,000	
October 24	Whitman	University of Washington Stadium; Seattle, WA	W 64–2	2,000	
October 31	at Washington State	Rogers Field; Pullman, WA (rivalry)	W 23–0	2,500	
November 7	Stanford	University of Washington Stadium; Seattle, WA	W 13–0	40,000	
November 14	at California	California Memorial Stadium; Berkeley, CA	W 7–0	72,000	
November 21	at Puget Sound*	Tacoma, WA	W 80–7	2,000	
November 26	Oregon	University of Washington Stadium; Seattle, WA (rivalry)	W 15–14	23,000	
January 1, 1926	vs. Alabama*	Rose Bowl; Pasadena, CA (Rose Bowl)	L 19–20	45,000	
*Non-conference game
