= Elmer Tesreau =

American football player (1905–1955)

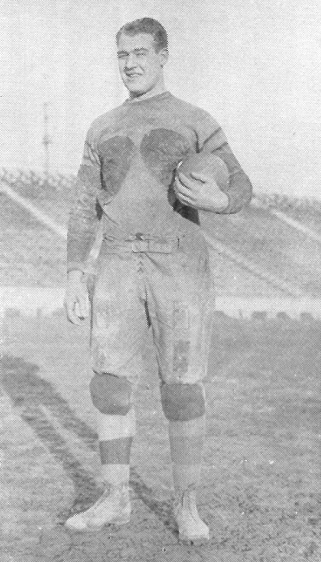
- Tesreau, 1925

Profile
- Position: Fullback

Personal information
- Born: January 22, 1905; Madison County, Missouri, U.S.
- Died: September 27, 1955 (aged 50); Seattle, Washington, U.S.

Career information
- High school: Chehalis (Washington)
- College: Washington (1923–1925)

Awards and highlights
- Third-team All-American (1925); First-team All-PCC (1924); Second-team All-PCC (1925)

Elmer Lee Tesreau (January 22, 1905 – September 27, 1955) was an American college football player, best known as a prominent fullback at the University of Washington during the 1920s.

== Biography ==
Tesreau was born in Missouri, moved to Chehalis, Washington, when young, and graduated from high school there. He then played for the Washington Huskies football program, first on the freshman team in 1922, then on the varsity squads in 1923, 1924, and 1925, in the same backfield as Wildcat Wilson.

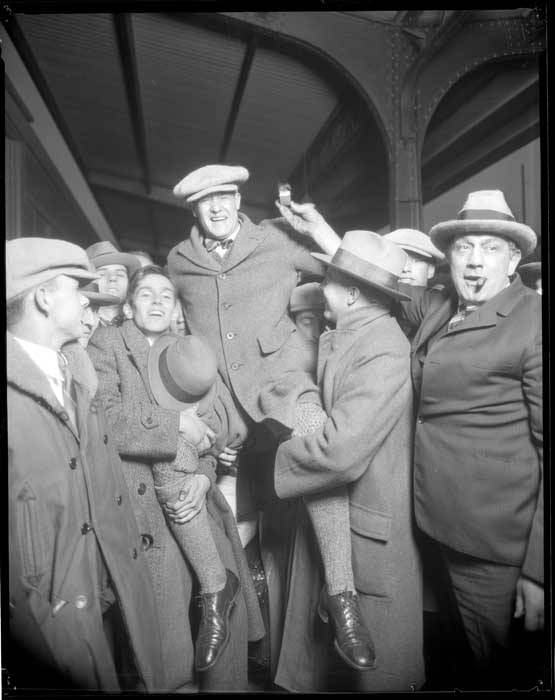
Tesreau being welcomed back to Seattle on November 16, 1925, after a win over Cal

The 1923 Huskies went 10–1 during the regular season, losing only to Cal, then faced Navy in the 1924 Rose Bowl. Tesreau played through a knee injury in the 14–14 tie, and discovered after the game that he had broken a leg. The 1924 Huskies compiled an 8–1–1 record, but did not play in any of the limited bowl games of the era. Tesreau was captain of the 1925 Huskies—undefeated during the regular season (10 wins, and a tie against Nebraska), the team suffered a 20–19 loss to Alabama in the 1926 Rose Bowl.

Tesreau was also a pitcher for the Washington Huskies baseball team. He graduated as a member of the class 1926, then took an executive position with a surety company. He married Virginia Akin in November 1927. They had one daughter, and were divorced in 1933. In 1942, Tesreau faced several charges following a car accident in Seattle; at the time, he was working in a shipyard on Lake Union.

Tesreau died in Seattle in September 1955, aged 50. He was posthumously inducted to the Husky Hall of Fame at the University of Washington in 1985.
