= 1925 Idaho Vandals football team =

American college football season

1925 Idaho Vandals football
- Conference: Northwest Conference, Pacific Coast Conference
- Record: 3–5 (2–3 Northwest, 2–3 PCC)
- Head coach: Robert L. Mathews (4th season)
- Home stadium: MacLean Field

1925 Northwest Conference football standings
| | Conf. | | | | | Overall |
| Team | W | | L | | T | W | | L | | T |
|---|---|---|---|---|---|---|---|---|---|---|
| Oregon Agricultural + | 7 | – | 0 | – | 0 | 7 | – | 2 | – | 0 |
| Washington + | 5 | – | 0 | – | 0 | 10 | – | 1 | – | 1 |
| Gonzaga | 2 | – | 1 | – | 2 | 7 | – | 2 | – | 2 |
| Whitman | 2 | – | 3 | – | 0 | 4 | – | 3 | – | 0 |
| Idaho | 2 | – | 3 | – | 0 | 3 | – | 5 | – | 0 |
| Montana | 1 | – | 3 | – | 1 | 3 | – | 4 | – | 1 |
| Washington State | 1 | – | 3 | – | 1 | 3 | – | 4 | – | 1 |
| Pacific (OR) | 1 | – | 3 | – | 0 | 3 | – | 5 | – | 1 |
| Oregon | 1 | – | 3 | – | 0 | 1 | – | 5 | – | 1 |
| Willamette | 0 | – | 4 | – | 0 | 2 | – | 7 | – | 0 |
+ – Conference co-champions

1925 Pacific Coast Conference football standings
| | Conf. | | | | | Overall |
| Team | W | | L | | T | W | | L | | T |
|---|---|---|---|---|---|---|---|---|---|---|
| No. 7 Washington $ | 5 | – | 0 | – | 0 | 10 | – | 1 | – | 1 |
| No. 8 Stanford | 4 | – | 1 | – | 0 | 7 | – | 2 | – | 0 |
| USC | 3 | – | 2 | – | 0 | 11 | – | 2 | – | 0 |
| Oregon Agricultural | 3 | – | 2 | – | 0 | 7 | – | 2 | – | 0 |
| California | 2 | – | 2 | – | 0 | 6 | – | 3 | – | 0 |
| Idaho | 2 | – | 3 | – | 0 | 3 | – | 5 | – | 0 |
| Washington State | 2 | – | 3 | – | 0 | 3 | – | 4 | – | 1 |
| Montana | 1 | – | 4 | – | 0 | 3 | – | 4 | – | 1 |
| Oregon | 0 | – | 5 | – | 0 | 1 | – | 5 | – | 1 |
$ – Conference champion; Rankings from Dickinson System

The 1925 Idaho Vandals football team represented the University of Idaho as a member of the Northwest Conference and the Pacific Coast Conference (PCC) during the 1925 college football season. Led by Robert L. Mathews in his fourth and final season as head coach, the Vandals compiled an overall record of 3–5. Idaho had a record of 2–3 in Northwest Conference play, tying for fourth place, and 2–3 against PCC opponents, tying for sixth. The team played home games on campus, at MacLean Field in Moscow, Idaho.

Idaho defeated neighbor Washington State for the third straight year in the Battle of the Palouse, and the second consecutive win at Rogers Field in Pullman. Since this three-peat of 101 years ago, Idaho has won only five games in the rivalry, the next victory came 29 years later in 1954.

USC came north in late October and met Idaho in Moscow for the only time in history, and won 51–7 on a Friday afternoon. The next day in nearby Pullman, Washington State hosted Washington, decades before the rivalry became known as the Apple Cup. A special train from Boise brought up football fans from southern Idaho to watch both games for a package fare of fifty dollars for the four-day jaunt.

Idaho opened the season with three wins, but dropped its final five games. After the season, Mathews left for Saint Louis University and was succeeded by Charles F. Erb, a former all-PCC quarterback at the University of California.

== Schedule ==
| Date | Opponent | Site | Result | Source |
|---|---|---|---|---|
| October 2 | College of Idaho* | MacLean Field; Moscow, ID | W 16–14 | |
| October 10 | at Oregon | Hayward Field; Eugene, OR | W 6–0 | |
| October 17 | at Washington State | Rogers Field; Pullman, WA (Battle of the Palouse) | W 7–6 | |
| October 24 | at Gonzaga | Gonzaga Stadium; Spokane, WA | L 3–12 | |
| October 30 | USC | MacLean Field; Moscow, ID | L 7–51 | |
| November 7 | Montana | MacLean Field; Moscow, ID (rivalry) | L 14–20 | |
| November 21 | Oregon Agricultural | Public School Field; Boise, ID | L 7–16 | |
| November 26 | at Creighton* | Creighton Stadium; Omaha, NE | L 19–34 | |
*Non-conference game
