= 1925 Oregon Webfoots football team =

American college football season

1925 Oregon Webfoots football
- Conference: Northwest Conference, Pacific Coast Conference
- Record: 1–5–1 (1–3 Northwest, 0–5 PCC)
- Head coach: Richard Shore Smith (2nd season)
- Captain: Bob Mautz
- Home stadium: Hayward Field

1925 Northwest Conference football standings
| | Conf. | | | | | Overall |
| Team | W | | L | | T | W | | L | | T |
|---|---|---|---|---|---|---|---|---|---|---|
| Oregon Agricultural + | 7 | – | 0 | – | 0 | 7 | – | 2 | – | 0 |
| Washington + | 5 | – | 0 | – | 0 | 10 | – | 1 | – | 1 |
| Gonzaga | 2 | – | 1 | – | 2 | 7 | – | 2 | – | 2 |
| Whitman | 2 | – | 3 | – | 0 | 4 | – | 3 | – | 0 |
| Idaho | 2 | – | 3 | – | 0 | 3 | – | 5 | – | 0 |
| Montana | 1 | – | 3 | – | 1 | 3 | – | 4 | – | 1 |
| Washington State | 1 | – | 3 | – | 1 | 3 | – | 4 | – | 1 |
| Pacific (OR) | 1 | – | 3 | – | 0 | 3 | – | 5 | – | 1 |
| Oregon | 1 | – | 3 | – | 0 | 1 | – | 5 | – | 1 |
| Willamette | 0 | – | 4 | – | 0 | 2 | – | 7 | – | 0 |
+ – Conference co-champions

1925 Pacific Coast Conference football standings
| | Conf. | | | | | Overall |
| Team | W | | L | | T | W | | L | | T |
|---|---|---|---|---|---|---|---|---|---|---|
| No. 7 Washington $ | 5 | – | 0 | – | 0 | 10 | – | 1 | – | 1 |
| No. 8 Stanford | 4 | – | 1 | – | 0 | 7 | – | 2 | – | 0 |
| USC | 3 | – | 2 | – | 0 | 11 | – | 2 | – | 0 |
| Oregon Agricultural | 3 | – | 2 | – | 0 | 7 | – | 2 | – | 0 |
| California | 2 | – | 2 | – | 0 | 6 | – | 3 | – | 0 |
| Idaho | 2 | – | 3 | – | 0 | 3 | – | 5 | – | 0 |
| Washington State | 2 | – | 3 | – | 0 | 3 | – | 4 | – | 1 |
| Montana | 1 | – | 4 | – | 0 | 3 | – | 4 | – | 1 |
| Oregon | 0 | – | 5 | – | 0 | 1 | – | 5 | – | 1 |
$ – Conference champion; Rankings from Dickinson System

The 1925 Oregon Webfoots football team represented the University of Oregon as a member of the Northwest Conference and the Pacific Coast Conference (PCC) during the 1925 college football season. In their second, non-consecutive season under head coach Richard Shore Smith, the Webfoots compiled an overall record of 1–5–1 and were outscored by a total of 108 to 53. Oregon had a record of 1–3 in Northwest Conference play, placing in a four-way tie for sixth, and 0–5 against PCC opponents, finishing last out of nine teams. The team played home games on campus, at Hayward Field in Eugene, Oregon.

== Schedule ==
| Date | Opponent | Site | Result | Attendance | Source |
|---|---|---|---|---|---|
| October 3 | Multnomah Athletic Club* | Hayward Field; Eugene, OR | T 0–0 | | |
| October 10 | Idaho | Hayward Field; Eugene, OR | L 0–6 | | |
| October 17 | Pacific (OR) | Hayward Field; Eugene, OR | W 13–0 | | |
| October 24 | California | Multnomah Stadium; Portland, OR | L 0–28 | 20,000 | |
| October 31 | at Stanford | Stanford Stadium; Stanford, CA | L 13–35 | 11,000 | |
| November 14 | Oregon Agricultural^{†} | Hayward Field; Eugene, OR (rivalry) | L 13–24 | | |
| November 28 | at Washington | Husky Stadium; Seattle, WA | L 14–15 | 23,000 | |
*Non-conference game; ^{†}Homecoming
