= 1925 Whitman Fighting Missionaries football team =

American college football season

1925 Whitman Fighting Missionaries football
- Conference: Northwest Conference
- Record: 4–3 (2–3 Northwest)
- Head coach: Vincent Borleske (10th season)
- Home stadium: Ankeny Field

1925 Northwest Conference football standings
	Conf.					Overall
Team	W		L		T	W		L		T
Oregon Agricultural +	7	–	0	–	0	7	–	2	–	0
Washington +	5	–	0	–	0	10	–	1	–	1
Gonzaga	2	–	1	–	2	7	–	2	–	2
Whitman	2	–	3	–	0	4	–	3	–	0
Idaho	2	–	3	–	0	3	–	5	–	0
Montana	1	–	3	–	1	3	–	4	–	1
Washington State	1	–	3	–	1	3	–	4	–	1
Pacific (OR)	1	–	3	–	0	3	–	5	–	1
Oregon	1	–	3	–	0	1	–	5	–	1
Willamette	0	–	4	–	0	2	–	7	–	0
+ – Conference co-champions

The 1925 Whitman Fighting Missionaries football team represented Whitman College as a member of the Northwest Conference during the 1925 college football season. Under tenth-year head coach Vincent Borleske, the Fighting Missionaries compiled an overall record of 4–3 with a mark of 2–3 in conference play, and finished tied for fourth in the Northwest Conference.

== Schedule ==
Date	Opponent	Site	Result	Attendance	Source
October 2	Cheney Normal*	Ankeny Field; Walla Walla, WA	W 25–0		
October 17	at Oregon Agricultural	Multnomah Field; Portland, OR	L 0–62		
October 24	at Washington	University of Washington Stadium; Seattle, WA	L 2–64	2,000	
October 31	at Willamette	Sweetland Field; Salem, OR	W 20–13		
November 7	at Gonzaga	Gonzaga Stadium; Spokane, WA	L 0–13		
November 14	Puget Sound*	Ankeny Field; Walla Walla, WA	W 36–6		
November 26	Pacific (OR)	Ankeny Field; Walla Walla, WA	W 13–7		
*Non-conference game
