= 1925 Gonzaga Bulldogs football team =

American college football season

1925 Gonzaga Bulldogs football
- Conference: Northwest Conference
- Record: 7–2–2 (2–1–2 Northwest)
- Head coach: Clipper Smith (1st season)
- Home stadium: Gonzaga Stadium

1925 Northwest Conference football standings
	Conf.					Overall
Team	W		L		T	W		L		T
Oregon Agricultural +	7	–	0	–	0	7	–	2	–	0
Washington +	5	–	0	–	0	10	–	1	–	1
Gonzaga	2	–	1	–	2	7	–	2	–	2
Whitman	2	–	3	–	0	4	–	3	–	0
Idaho	2	–	3	–	0	3	–	5	–	0
Montana	1	–	3	–	1	3	–	4	–	1
Washington State	1	–	3	–	1	3	–	4	–	1
Pacific (OR)	1	–	3	–	0	3	–	5	–	1
Oregon	1	–	3	–	0	1	–	5	–	1
Willamette	0	–	4	–	0	2	–	7	–	0
+ – Conference co-champions

The 1925 Gonzaga Bulldogs football team was an American football team that represented Gonzaga University as a member of the Northwest Conference during the 1925 college football season. In their first year under head coach Clipper Smith, the Bulldogs compiled an overall record of 7–2–2 record with a mark of 2–1–2 in conference play, placing third in the Northwest Conference. Gonzaga shut out five of 11 opponents, and outscored all opponents by a total of 203 to 68.

== Schedule ==
Date	Time	Opponent	Site	Result	Attendance	Source
September 26	2:30 p.m.	Cheney Normal*	Gonzaga Stadium; Spokane, WA	W 37–0	1,500	
October 3		Mount St. Charles*	Gonzaga Stadium; Spokane, WA	W 45–0		
October 9		at Oregon Agricultural	Bell Field; Corvallis, OR	L 0–22		
October 17		vs. Montana	Clark Park; Butte, MT	T 14–14	2,000	
October 24		Idaho	Gonzaga Stadium; Spokane, WA (rivalry)	W 12–3		
October 31		Haskell*	Gonzaga Stadium; Spokane, WA	L 9–10	15,000	
November 7		Whitman	Gonzaga Stadium; Spokane, WA	W 13–0		
November 11	1:30 p.m.	vs. College of Idaho*	Public School Field; Boise, ID	W 33–13		
November 21		Washington State	Gonzaga Stadium; Spokane, WA	T 0–0	6,000	
November 26		Multnomah Athletic Club*	Gonzaga Stadium; Spokane, WA	W 13–6		
December 27		at Los Angeles Athletic Club*	Wrigley Field; Los Angeles, CA	W 29–0	6,500	
*Non-conference game; All times are in Pacific time; Source:
