= Bill Kelly (quarterback) =

American football player (1905–1931)

"Wild Bill" Kelly
- Kelly in 1927

No. 18, 23, 24
- Positions: Blocking back, tailback

Personal information
- Born: June 24, 1905; Denver, Colorado, U.S.
- Died: November 14, 1931 (aged 26); New York, New York, U.S.
- Listed height: 5 ft 10 in (1.78 m)
- Listed weight: 184 lb (83 kg)

Career information
- College: Montana

Career history
- New York Yankees (1927–1928); Frankford Yellow Jackets (1929); Brooklyn Dodgers (1930)

Awards and highlights
- Second-team All-American (1926); 2× First-team All-PCC (1925, 1926)

Career statistics
- Games played: 52
- Starts: 36
- Touchdowns: 7 Other statistics incomplete
- Stats at Pro Football Reference
- College Football Hall of Fame

William C. "Wild Bill" Kelly (June 24, 1905 – November 14, 1931) was an American football player who played collegiately at the University of Montana and for several teams in the National Football League (NFL). A star in four sports during his high school days, Kelly was regarded as one of the greatest Montana athletes of the 1920s and among the best passers in the NFL during the late 1920s.

He was posthumously inducted into the College Football Hall of Fame in 1969.

== Biography ==
=== Early life ===
Bill Kelly was born in Denver, Colorado, on June 24, 1905, the son of James and Annie Kelly. His father had been a farmer in South Dakota before moving to Denver to enter the wholesale liquor business. Unfortunately, James Kelly died of pneumonia at the age of 38 and in 1909 the four-year old's mother moved with her son to Butte, Montana, where she married a Northern Pacific Railroad employee named Otis Johnson Price. The family soon moved to Missoula, located in the western part of the state, which became the town in which Kelly grew up.

A gifted athlete, Kelly was a star in four sports during his younger years — football, baseball, basketball, and track.

It was on the gridiron where he made his greatest mark. Kelly's legend started when he led Missoula High School to the school's first state championship in 1921.

The win made Kelly a local hero, and he was recruited to play for the hometown college, the University of Montana. It was rumored that Notre Dame University sought Kelly's services, but the financial support of a local booster — an automobile dealer named H.O. Bell, who paid Kelly $75 a month to perform a job for which he "didn't perform much work" — was successful in keeping the gridiron star at home.

=== College career ===
It didn't take long for him to make his mark at the college level — as a sophomore, he ran 9 times for scores of longer than 40 yards. He played quarterback, but he was most noted for his skills as an open-field runner. Kelly also performed as a kick returner and during his final two seasons he ran back 5 kickoffs for scores, including 2 of more than 90 yards.

Although his skills were legendary and he provided fans with their share of excitement, Kelly was not surrounded with enough talent at Montana to deliver a winning season during his college career. He never lost to rival Montana State College, however, leading the team to big wins in 1925 and 1926, games in which scored 7 touchdowns and made 4 interceptions.

In the 1927 East-West Shrine Game, Kelly threw the only touchdown pass of the day, which provided the margin of victory in a 7–3 win by West.

=== Professional career ===
Kelly initially planned to enter West Point to pursue a career as a military officer following graduation from Montana in the spring of 1927, but C. C. Pyle, organizer of a new New York professional football franchise, sent head coach Ralph Scott to Missoula to induce Kelly to join the legendary Red Grange on the squad. The recruiting mission was successful and Kelly was signed as a member of the 1927 New York Yankees.

In an era in which running the unaerodynamic football dominated the game, Kelly was regarded as a gifted passer. "The Montana star throws amazing forward passes on a straight line as if it was a baseball," one journalist marveled in 1927. The National Football League did not maintain passing records until 1934, however, so Kelly's relative gifts and failures as a passer are regrettably lost to the mists of time.

Kelly would later play for the Frankford Yellow Jackets and Brooklyn Dodgers from 1927 through 1930.

Kelly was regarded as one of the best passers of his era in the NFL. His 1929 teammate George Wilson recalled: "he would go to the left or right, leap into the air and throw a pass, could do it better than anyone other than Benny Friedman of Michigan and later the New York Giants, who was the best in my opinion."

=== Death and legacy ===
Kelly collapsed suddenly and died while watching a football game in New York at the age of 26.

The College Football Hall of Fame inducted Kelly in 1969, the same year he was voted the greatest football player in Montana history in a poll by the Billings Gazette.

In 1971, he was named as the quarterback of the East-West Shrine Game's all-time team.
