= 1925 Stanford football team =

American college football season

1925 Stanford football
- Conference: Pacific Coast Conference
- Record: 7–2 (4–1 PCC)
- Head coach: Pop Warner (2nd season)
- Offensive scheme: Double-wing
- Home stadium: Stanford Stadium

Uniform

1925 Pacific Coast Conference football standings
| | Conf. | | | | | Overall |
| Team | W | | L | | T | W | | L | | T |
|---|---|---|---|---|---|---|---|---|---|---|
| No. 7 Washington $ | 5 | – | 0 | – | 0 | 10 | – | 1 | – | 1 |
| No. 8 Stanford | 4 | – | 1 | – | 0 | 7 | – | 2 | – | 0 |
| USC | 3 | – | 2 | – | 0 | 11 | – | 2 | – | 0 |
| Oregon Agricultural | 3 | – | 2 | – | 0 | 7 | – | 2 | – | 0 |
| California | 2 | – | 2 | – | 0 | 6 | – | 3 | – | 0 |
| Idaho | 2 | – | 3 | – | 0 | 3 | – | 5 | – | 0 |
| Washington State | 2 | – | 3 | – | 0 | 3 | – | 4 | – | 1 |
| Montana | 1 | – | 4 | – | 0 | 3 | – | 4 | – | 1 |
| Oregon | 0 | – | 5 | – | 0 | 1 | – | 5 | – | 1 |
$ – Conference champion; Rankings from Dickinson System

The 1925 Stanford football team was an American football team that represented Stanford University as a member of the Pacific Coast Conference (PCC) during the 1925 PCC football season. In its second season under head coach Pop Warner, Stanford compiled a 7–2 record (4–1 against PCC opponents) and finished second in the PCC. Its only conference loss was against conference champion Washington. The team played its home games at Stanford Stadium in Stanford, California. The team was ranked No. 8 in the nation in the Dickinson System ratings released in January 1926.

In the first-ever meeting between Stanford and eventual conference rival UCLA, Stanford defeated the Bruins 82–0, which tied the record for Stanford's greatest margin of victory.

Stanford's fullback Ernie Nevers was selected as a consensus first-team player on the 1925 All-America team. Nevers was later inducted into both the College Football Hall of Fame and the Pro Football Hall of Fame. Other key players included end Ted Shipkey and guard Fred H. Swan.

== Schedule ==
| Date | Opponent | Site | Result | Attendance | Source |
|---|---|---|---|---|---|
| September 26 | Olympic Club* | Stanford Stadium; Stanford, CA | L 0–9 | 11,000 | |
| October 3 | Santa Clara* | Stanford Stadium; Stanford, CA | W 20–3 | 13,000 | |
| October 10 | Occidental* | Stanford Stadium; Stanford, CA | W 28–0 | | |
| October 17 | USC | Los Angeles Memorial Coliseum; Los Angeles, CA (rivalry) | W 13–9 | 70,000 | |
| October 24 | vs. Oregon Agricultural | Stanford Stadium; Stanford, CA | W 26–10 | 29,000 | |
| October 31 | Oregon | Stanford Stadium; Stanford, CA | W 35–13 | 11,000 | |
| November 7 | at Washington | Husky Stadium; Seattle, WA | L 0–13 | 40,000 | |
| November 14 | Southern Branch* | Stanford Stadium; Stanford, CA | W 82–0 | | |
| November 21 | California | Stanford Stadium; Stanford, CA (Big Game) | W 26–14 | 74,000 | |
*Non-conference game
