= 1925 Oregon Agricultural Aggies football team =

American college football season

1925 Oregon Agricultural Aggies football

Northwest Conference co-champion
- Conference: Northwest Conference, Pacific Coast Conference
- Record: 7–2 (7–0 Northwest, 3–2 PCC)
- Head coach: Paul J. Schissler (2nd season)
- Home stadium: Bell Field

1925 Northwest Conference football standings
	Conf.					Overall
Team	W		L		T	W		L		T
Oregon Agricultural +	7	–	0	–	0	7	–	2	–	0
Washington +	5	–	0	–	0	10	–	1	–	1
Gonzaga	2	–	1	–	2	7	–	2	–	2
Whitman	2	–	3	–	0	4	–	3	–	0
Idaho	2	–	3	–	0	3	–	5	–	0
Montana	1	–	3	–	1	3	–	4	–	1
Washington State	1	–	3	–	1	3	–	4	–	1
Pacific (OR)	1	–	3	–	0	3	–	5	–	1
Oregon	1	–	3	–	0	1	–	5	–	1
Willamette	0	–	4	–	0	2	–	7	–	0
+ – Conference co-champions

1925 Pacific Coast Conference football standings
	Conf.					Overall
Team	W		L		T	W		L		T
No. 7 Washington $	5	–	0	–	0	10	–	1	–	1
No. 8 Stanford	4	–	1	–	0	7	–	2	–	0
USC	3	–	2	–	0	11	–	2	–	0
Oregon Agricultural	3	–	2	–	0	7	–	2	–	0
California	2	–	2	–	0	6	–	3	–	0
Idaho	2	–	3	–	0	3	–	5	–	0
Washington State	2	–	3	–	0	3	–	4	–	1
Montana	1	–	4	–	0	3	–	4	–	1
Oregon	0	–	5	–	0	1	–	5	–	1
$ – Conference champion; Rankings from Dickinson System

The 1925 Oregon Agricultural Aggies football team represented Oregon Agricultural College (OAC)—now known as Oregon State University—as a member of the Northwest Conference and the Pacific Coast Conference (PCC) during the 1925 college football season. In its second season under head coach Paul J. Schissler, the Aggies compiled an overall record of 7–2 and outscored opponents 268 to 81. Oregon Agricultural had a record of 7–0 in Northwest Conference play, sharing the conference title with Washington, and 3–2 against PCC opponents, tying for third place. Under Schissler, from 1925 to 1932, no team captains were elected. The team played its home games on campus at Bell Field in Corvallis, Oregon.

== Schedule ==
Date	Opponent	Site	Result	Attendance	Source
October 3	Willamette	Bell Field; Corvallis, OR	W 51–0		
October 9	Gonzaga	Bell Field; Corvallis, OR	W 22–0		
October 17	Whitman	Multnomah Field; Portland, OR	W 62–0		
October 24	at Stanford	Stanford Stadium; Stanford, CA	L 10–26	29,000	
October 31	Montana	Bell Field; Corvallis, OR	W 27–7		
November 7	Pacific (OR)	Bell Field; Corvallis, OR	W 56–0		
November 14	at Oregon	Hayward Field; Eugene, OR (rivalry)	W 24–13		
November 21	at Idaho	Public School Field; Boise, ID	W 16–7		
December 5	at USC	Los Angeles Memorial Coliseum; Los Angeles, CA	L 0–28	25,000	
