= 1925 Washington State Cougars football team =

American college football season

1925 Washington State Cougars football
- Conference: Northwest Conference, Pacific Coast Conference
- Record: 3–4–1 (1–3–1 Northwest, 2–3 PCC)
- Head coach: Albert Exendine (3rd season)
- Captain: Duke Slater
- Home stadium: Rogers Field

1925 Northwest Conference football standings
	Conf.					Overall
Team	W		L		T	W		L		T
Oregon Agricultural +	7	–	0	–	0	7	–	2	–	0
Washington +	5	–	0	–	0	10	–	1	–	1
Gonzaga	2	–	1	–	2	7	–	2	–	2
Whitman	2	–	3	–	0	4	–	3	–	0
Idaho	2	–	3	–	0	3	–	5	–	0
Montana	1	–	3	–	1	3	–	4	–	1
Washington State	1	–	3	–	1	3	–	4	–	1
Pacific (OR)	1	–	3	–	0	3	–	5	–	1
Oregon	1	–	3	–	0	1	–	5	–	1
Willamette	0	–	4	–	0	2	–	7	–	0
+ – Conference co-champions

1925 Pacific Coast Conference football standings
	Conf.					Overall
Team	W		L		T	W		L		T
No. 7 Washington $	5	–	0	–	0	10	–	1	–	1
No. 8 Stanford	4	–	1	–	0	7	–	2	–	0
USC	3	–	2	–	0	11	–	2	–	0
Oregon Agricultural	3	–	2	–	0	7	–	2	–	0
California	2	–	2	–	0	6	–	3	–	0
Idaho	2	–	3	–	0	3	–	5	–	0
Washington State	2	–	3	–	0	3	–	4	–	1
Montana	1	–	4	–	0	3	–	4	–	1
Oregon	0	–	5	–	0	1	–	5	–	1
$ – Conference champion; Rankings from Dickinson System

The 1925 Washington State Cougars football team represented Washington State College—now known as Washington State University—as a member of the Northwest Conference and the Pacific Coast Conference (PCC) during the 1925 college football season. In their third and final season under head coach Albert Exendine, the Cougars compiled an overall record of 3–4–1 and were outscored their opponents by a combined total of 104 to 67. Washington State had a record of 1–3–1 in Northwest Conference play, placing in a four-way tie for sixth, and 2–3 against PCC opponents, tying for sixth place.

== Schedule ==
Date	Opponent	Site	Result	Attendance	Source
October 3	at Montana	Dornblaser Field; Missoula, MT	W 9–0	4,000–5,000	
October 17	Idaho	Rogers Field; Pullman, WA (rivalry)	L 6–7	10,000	
October 31	Washington	Rogers Field; Pullman, WA (rivalry)	L 0–23	2,500	
November 7	at California	California Memorial Stadium; Berkeley, CA	L 0–35	30,000	
November 21	at Gonzaga	Gonzaga Stadium; Spokane, WA	T 0–0	6,000	
November 28	at USC	Los Angeles Memorial Coliseum; Los Angeles, CA	W 17–12	12,000	
December 26	at Honolulu Town Team*	Moiliili Field; Honolulu, Territory of Hawaii	W 24–7	10,000	
January 1, 1926	at Hawaii*	Moiliili Field; Honolulu, Territory of Hawaii	L 11–20	10,000	
*Non-conference game
