= Jim Dixon (American football) =

American football player, wrestler, and coach (1904–1966)

- Dixon, circa 1947

Profile
- Position: Tackle

Personal information
- Born: March 5, 1904; North Yakima, Washington U.S.
- Died: June 8, 1966 (aged 62); Benton County, Oregon, U.S.

Career information
- College: Oregon State University

Career history
- 1924–1926: Oregon State Beavers

Awards and highlights
- Second-team All-American (1926); 2× First-team All-PCC (1925, 1926)

James Victor Dixon (March 5, 1904 – June 8, 1966) was an American football player, wrestler and coach. He played college football at the tackle position for Oregon State University from 1924 to 1926 and was selected as a second-team player by Davis J. Walsh of the International News Service for his 1926 College Football All-America Team.

Dixon later served as an assistant football coach at Oregon State from 1933 to 1947 and as the head wrestling coach from 1934 to 1938 and 1952 to 1955. The Dixon Recreation Center on Oregon State's campus is named for him. Dixon has been inducted into the Oregon Sports Hall of Fame (1982) and the Oregon State Athletics Hall of Fame (1990).
