= 1925 California Golden Bears football team =

American college football season

1925 California Golden Bears football
- Conference: Pacific Coast Conference
- Record: 6–3 (2–2 PCC)
- Head coach: Andy Smith (10th season)
- Offensive scheme: Short-punt
- Captain: Tut Imlay
- Home stadium: California Memorial Stadium

Uniform
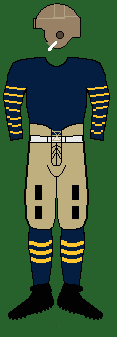

1925 Pacific Coast Conference football standings
| | Conf. | | | | | Overall |
| Team | W | | L | | T | W | | L | | T |
|---|---|---|---|---|---|---|---|---|---|---|
| No. 7 Washington $ | 5 | – | 0 | – | 0 | 10 | – | 1 | – | 1 |
| No. 8 Stanford | 4 | – | 1 | – | 0 | 7 | – | 2 | – | 0 |
| USC | 3 | – | 2 | – | 0 | 11 | – | 2 | – | 0 |
| Oregon Agricultural | 3 | – | 2 | – | 0 | 7 | – | 2 | – | 0 |
| California | 2 | – | 2 | – | 0 | 6 | – | 3 | – | 0 |
| Idaho | 2 | – | 3 | – | 0 | 3 | – | 5 | – | 0 |
| Washington State | 2 | – | 3 | – | 0 | 3 | – | 4 | – | 1 |
| Montana | 1 | – | 4 | – | 0 | 3 | – | 4 | – | 1 |
| Oregon | 0 | – | 5 | – | 0 | 1 | – | 5 | – | 1 |
$ – Conference champion; Rankings from Dickinson System

The 1925 California Golden Bears football team was an American football team that represented the University of California, Berkeley in the Pacific Coast Conference (PCC) during the 1925 PCC football season. In its 10th and final year under head coach Andy Smith, the team compiled a 6–3 record (2–2 against PCC opponents), finished in fifth place in the PCC, and outscored its opponents by a combined total of 192 to 49.

== Schedule ==
| Date | Opponent | Site | Result | Attendance | Source |
|---|---|---|---|---|---|
| September 26 | Santa Clara* | California Memorial Stadium; Berkeley, CA | W 28–0 | | |
| October 3 | Nevada* | California Memorial Stadium; Berkeley, CA | W 54–0 | | |
| October 10 | Olympic Club* | California Memorial Stadium; Berkeley, CA | L 0–15 | 50,000 | |
| October 17 | Saint Mary's* | California Memorial Stadium; Berkeley, CA | W 6–0 | 70,000 | |
| October 24 | at Oregon | Multnomah Field; Portland, OR | W 28–0 | 20,000 | |
| October 31 | at Pomona* | Los Angeles Memorial Coliseum; Los Angeles, CA | W 27–0 | 20,000 | |
| November 7 | Washington State | California Memorial Stadium; Berkeley, CA | W 35–7 | 30,000 | |
| November 14 | Washington | California Memorial Stadium; Berkeley, CA | L 0–7 | 72,000 | |
| November 21 | at Stanford | Stanford Stadium; Stanford, CA (Big Game) | L 14–26 | 74,000 | |
*Non-conference game
