= Hobbs Adams =

American football player and coach (1902–2002)

Biographical details
- Born: November 2, 1902; San Diego, California, U.S.
- Died: September 24, 2002 (aged 99)

Playing career

Football
- 1923–1925: USC

Baseball
- 1924–1925: USC
- Position: End (football)

Coaching career (HC unless noted)

Football
- 1935–1939: USC (assistant)
- 1940–1941: Kansas State
- 1942: Jacksonville NAS
- 1946: Kansas State

Head coaching record
- Overall: 13–24–2

Accomplishments and honors

Awards
- 2× first-team All-PCC (1924, 1925)

John Hobbs Adams (November 2, 1902 – September 24, 2002) was an American college football player and coach. He served two tenures as football coach for the Kansas State Wildcats (separated by his service in World War II) and also coached high school football in San Diego.

== Playing career ==
Adams grew up in San Diego and attended San Diego High School, where he starred in football, baseball, basketball and track, before graduating in 1922. Adams went on to play at the University of Southern California in Los Angeles where he captained the 1925 Trojan football team and also played baseball.

While playing on the USC football team in 1924, he was a key player that helped the team defeat Syracuse by score of 16–0, where future Kansas State head coach Pappy Waldorf was playing (Adams would later hold the head coaching position at Kansas State).

== Coaching career ==
=== Assistant coaching ===
Prior to coaching at Kansas State, Adams was an assistant coach at the University of Southern California (USC) for five seasons under Howard Jones.

=== Kansas State ===
Adams was the 18th head football coach for the Kansas State Wildcats in Manhattan, Kansas and he held that position for three seasons: 1940, 1941, and then again in 1946 (Ward Haylett and Lud Fiser were head coaches from 1942 through 1945). His overall coaching record at Kansas State was 4–21–2. The bright spots in his coaching career included a 1940 victory over the cross-state rival Kansas Jayhawks by a score of 20–0 and a 12–6 victory in the 1941 season over the Nebraska Cornhuskers.

== Head coaching record ==
Year	Team	Overall	Conference	Standing
Kansas State Wildcats (Big Six Conference) (1940–1941)
1940	Kansas State	2–7	1–4	5th
1941	Kansas State	2–5–2	1–3–1	5th
Jacksonville Naval Air Station Fliers (Independent) (1942)
1942	Jacksonville NAS	9–3		
Jacksonville NAS:		9–3		
Kansas State Wildcats (Big Six Conference) (1946)
1946	Kansas State	0–9	0–5	6th
Kansas State:		4–21–2	2–12–1	
Total:		13–24–2		
