= 1925 Southern Branch Grizzlies football team =

American college football season

1925 Southern Branch Grizzlies football
- Conference: Southern California Conference
- Record: 5–3–1 (3–1–1 SCC)
- Head coach: William H. Spaulding (1st season)
- Home stadium: Moore Field

1925 Southern California Conference football standings
	Conf.					Overall
Team	W		L		T	W		L		T
Occidental $	4	–	1	–	0	6	–	3	–	0
Southern Branch	3	–	1	–	1	5	–	3	–	1
Whittier	2	–	2	–	0	3	–	5	–	0
Caltech	1	–	2	–	1	2	–	6	–	1
Pomona	1	–	3	–	1	1	–	5	–	1
Redlands	1	–	3	–	1	3	–	5	–	1
$ – Conference champion

The 1925 Southern Branch Grizzlies football team was an American football team that represented the Southern Branch of the University of California (later known as UCLA) as a member of the Southern California Intercollegiate Athletic Conference (SCIAC) during the 1925 college football season. The program, which was later known as the Bruins, was in its first year under head coach William H. Spaulding. The team compiled a 5–3–1 record but were outscored by a total of 130 to 91. The team played its home games at Moore Field.

== Schedule ==
Date	Opponent	Site	Result	Attendance	Source
September 26	at San Diego State*	College Field; San Diego, CA	W 7–0	5,000	
October 3	La Verne*	Moore Field; Los Angeles, CA	W 16–3	5,500	
October 10	Pomona	Moore Field; Los Angeles, CA	W 26–0	8,500	
October 16	Whittier	Moore Field; Los Angeles, CA	L 0–7	13,000	
October 24	at Occidental	Patterson Field; Los Angeles, CA	W 9–0		
October 31	at Saint Mary's*	California Memorial Stadium; Berkeley, CA	L 0–28		
November 7	Redlands	Moore Field; Los Angeles, CA	W 23–0		
November 14	at Stanford*	Stanford Stadium; Stanford, CA	L 0–82		
November 21	at Caltech	Tournament Park; Pasadena, CA	T 10–10	6,000	
*Non-conference game
