= 1925 Montana Grizzlies football team =

American college football season

1925 Montana Grizzlies football
- Conference: Northwest Conference, Pacific Coast Conference
- Record: 3–4–1 (1–3–1 Northwest, 1–4 PCC)
- Head coach: Earl Clark (2nd season)
- Home stadium: Dornblaser Field

1925 Northwest Conference football standings
	Conf.					Overall
Team	W		L		T	W		L		T
Oregon Agricultural +	7	–	0	–	0	7	–	2	–	0
Washington +	5	–	0	–	0	10	–	1	–	1
Gonzaga	2	–	1	–	2	7	–	2	–	2
Whitman	2	–	3	–	0	4	–	3	–	0
Idaho	2	–	3	–	0	3	–	5	–	0
Montana	1	–	3	–	1	3	–	4	–	1
Washington State	1	–	3	–	1	3	–	4	–	1
Pacific (OR)	1	–	3	–	0	3	–	5	–	1
Oregon	1	–	3	–	0	1	–	5	–	1
Willamette	0	–	4	–	0	2	–	7	–	0
+ – Conference co-champions

1925 Pacific Coast Conference football standings
	Conf.					Overall
Team	W		L		T	W		L		T
No. 7 Washington $	5	–	0	–	0	10	–	1	–	1
No. 8 Stanford	4	–	1	–	0	7	–	2	–	0
USC	3	–	2	–	0	11	–	2	–	0
Oregon Agricultural	3	–	2	–	0	7	–	2	–	0
California	2	–	2	–	0	6	–	3	–	0
Idaho	2	–	3	–	0	3	–	5	–	0
Washington State	2	–	3	–	0	3	–	4	–	1
Montana	1	–	4	–	0	3	–	4	–	1
Oregon	0	–	5	–	0	1	–	5	–	1
$ – Conference champion; Rankings from Dickinson System

The 1925 Montana Grizzlies football team represented the University of Montana as a member of the Northwest Conference and the Pacific Coast Conference (PCC) during the 1925 college football season. Led by Earl Clark in his second and final season as head coach, the Grizzlies compiled an overall record of 3–4–1. Montana had a record of 1–3–1 in Northwest Conference play, placing in a four-way tie for sixth, and 1–4 against PCC opponents, finish eighth The team played home games at Dornblaser Field in Missoula, Montana.

== Schedule ==
Date	Opponent	Site	Result	Attendance	Source
October 3	Washington State	Dornblaser Field; Missoula, MT	L 0–9	4,000–5,000	
October 10	at Washington	Husky Stadium; Seattle, WA	L 10–30	20,000	
October 17	vs. Gonzaga	Clark Park; Butte, MT	T 14–14	2,000	
October 24	Montana Mines*	Dornblaser Field; Missoula, MT	W 57–0		
October 31	at Oregon Agricultural	Bell Field; Corvallis, OR	L 7–27		
November 7	at Idaho	MacLean Field; Moscow, ID (rivalry)	W 20–14		
November 14	at USC	Los Angeles Memorial Coliseum; Los Angeles, CA	L 7–27	25,000	
November 28	Montana State*	Dornblaser Field; Missoula, MT (rivalry)	W 28–7		
*Non-conference game
