= 1926 Rose Bowl =

American college football game

- 12th Rose Bowl Game
Alabama Crimson Tide	Washington Huskies
(9–0)	(10–0–1)
SoCon	PCC
20	19
Head coach: Wallace Wade	Head coach: Enoch Bagshaw
	1	2	3	4	Total
Alabama	0	0	20	0	20
Washington	6	6	0	7	19
- Date: January 1, 1926
- Season: 1925
- Stadium: Rose Bowl
- Location: Pasadena, California
- MVP: Johnny Mack Brown (Alabama)
- Referee: Walter Eckersall
- Attendance: 55,000

The 1926 Rose Bowl Game was held on January 1, 1926, in Pasadena, California. The game is commonly referred to as "The Game That Changed The South." The game featured the Alabama Crimson Tide, making their first bowl appearance, and the Washington Huskies.

The Crimson Tide was led by Johnny Mack Brown, and the Huskies by George "Wildcat" Wilson.

Alabama were victorious 20–19, as they scored all 20 points in the third quarter. With the victory, the Crimson Tide were awarded with their first national championship.

The game made its radio broadcast debut, with Charles Paddock, a sports writer and former Olympian track star, at the microphone. Coach Wade was later inducted into the Rose Bowl Hall of Fame in 1990.

Johnny Mack Brown went on to a long career as a movie actor, mostly in westerns. Actor Herman Brix (later known as Bruce Bennett) also appeared in the game for the Washington Huskies.

== Team selection ==
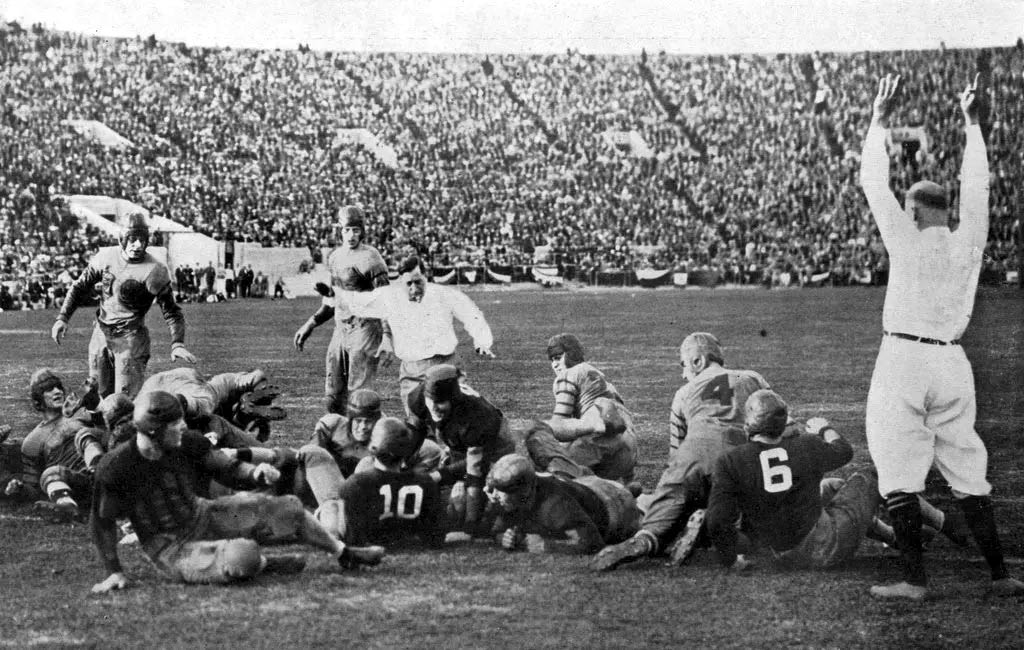
Alabama scoring a touchdown.

The Rose Bowl committee extended an invitation to Clark Shaughnessy's Tulane team, but the school administration declined the offer because it did not want to sacrifice academics to play a football game.

== Scoring ==
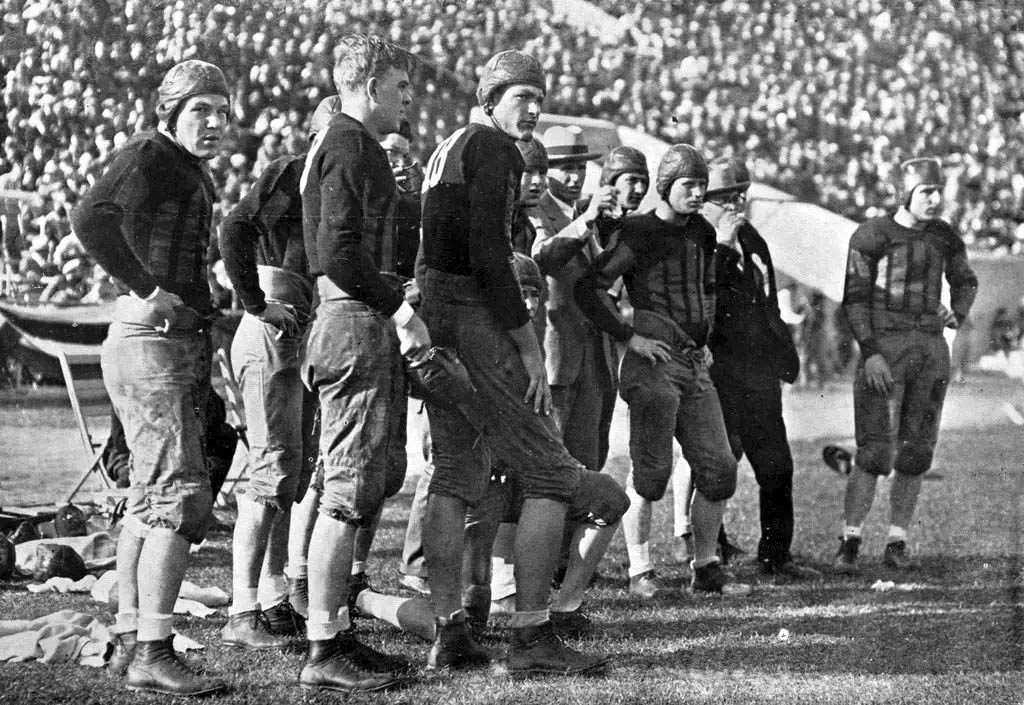
Coach Wallace and his players

=== First quarter ===
- Wash – Paton, 1-yard run (Guttormsen kick failed)

=== Second quarter ===
- Wash – Cole, 20-yard pass from Wilson (Guttormsen kick failed)

=== Third quarter ===
- Ala – Hubert, 1-yard run (Buckler kick good)
- Ala – Brown, 59-yard pass from Gillis (Buckler kick good)
- Ala – Brown, 30-yard pass from Hubert (Buckler kick failed)

=== Fourth quarter ===
- Wash – Guttormsen, 27-yard pass from Wilson (Cook kick good)
