= Wildcat Wilson =

American football player (1901–1963)

George Wilson
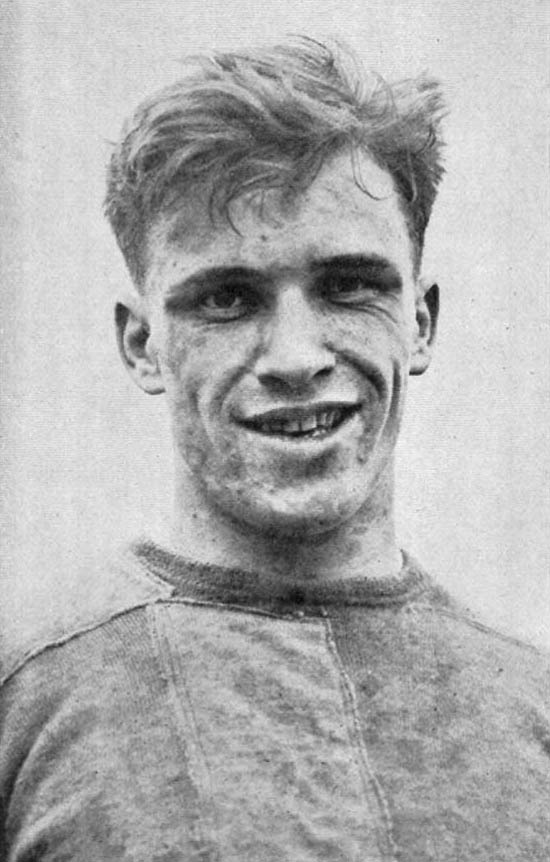
- Wilson c. 1924

Profile
- Position: Halfback

Personal information
- Born: September 6, 1901; Draughon, Arkansas, U.S. (Note: Draughon, Arkansas, is listed as his birthplace on his draft registration card of February 1942. Reference sites indicate Draughon was located in Cleveland County.) (Note: The College Football Hall of Fame lists his birthplace as Everett, Washington.)
- Died: December 27, 1963 (aged 62); San Francisco, California, U.S.
- Listed height: 5 ft 10.5 in (1.79 m)
- Listed weight: 185 lb (84 kg)

Career information
- College: Washington (1923–1925)

Career history
- 1926: Los Angeles Wildcats
- 1927–1929: Providence Steam Roller

Awards and highlights
- Consensus All-American (1925); Second-team All-American (1924); 3× First-team All-PCC (1923, 1924, 1925); Guy Flaherty Award (1925); Washington Huskies No. 33 retired
- College Football Hall of Fame

George Schly "Wildcat" Wilson (September 6, 1901 – December 27, 1963) was an American football player. After earning consensus All-American honors in 1925 as a halfback for the University of Washington, he played professionally, including three seasons in the National Football League (NFL). Listed at 5 feet 10 1/2 inches (1.791 m) and 185 pounds (84 kg), (Note: NFL.com lists him as 5 feet 11 inches (1.80 m) and 200 pounds (91 kg).) he was inducted to the College Football Hall of Fame in 1951.

== Collegiate career ==
Wilson played for the Washington Huskies football varsity squads of 1923, 1924, and 1925. Playing in the same backfield as fullback Elmer Tesreau, he scored a career 37 touchdowns as a member of the team, tying him with Joe Steele for a Husky record. Wilson's uniform number of 33 is one of only three that have been retired by the Husky football program.

Wilson played in the 1924 Rose Bowl, a 14–14 tie with Navy, a game that Tesreau played with a broken leg. Wilson had a standout game in the 1926 Rose Bowl, rushing for over 100 yards and throwing two touchdown passes, although Washington narrowly lost to Alabama, 20–19. Sportswriter Damon Runyon wrote that "George Wilson, the slashing back of the Washington team, was splashing the Crimson Tide at will. Then he got hurt." Washington was limited to 17 yards of offense and Alabama scored all of their points while Wilson was out of the game.

At the close of Wilson's collegiate career, head coach Enoch Bagshaw, who had followed Husky football since 1904, said that Wilson was "the greatest football played in the history of the University of Washington." In summarizing his career, the 1926 Husky college yearbook wrote that Wilson's "play was not only spectacular to the crowds but inspiring to his teammates as well."

== Professional football career ==
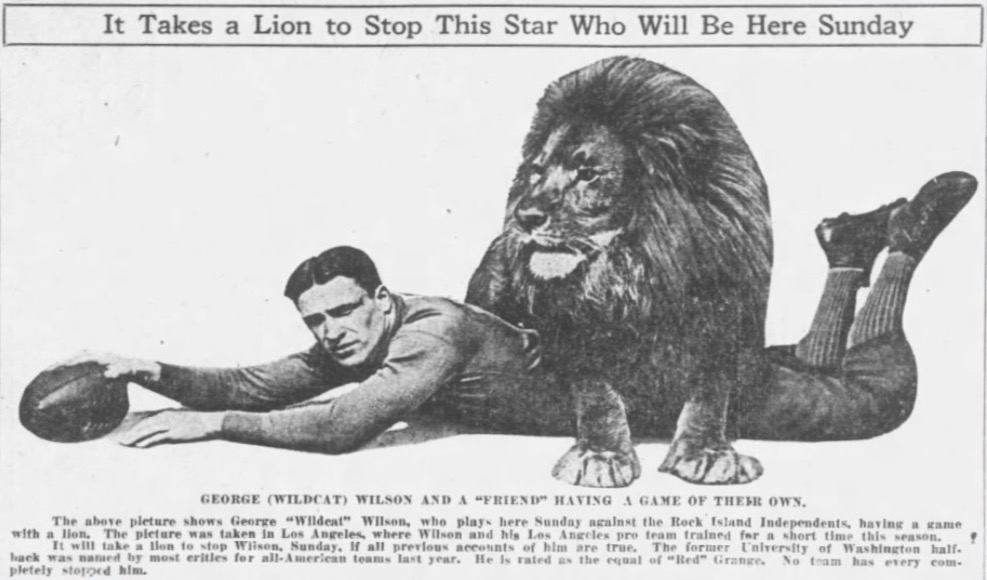
Promotional image of Wilson and a lion, from The Rock Island Argus of September 23, 1926

In January 1926, Wilson participated in a series of West Coast exhibition games against Red Grange, whom he admired and wanted to play against, and the Chicago Bears. His first game was with the Los Angeles Wildcats in the Los Angeles Memorial Coliseum; although he recorded 123 rushing yards, he also lost a fumble in the 17–7 loss. With the San Francisco Tigers at Kezar Stadium, Wilson had 87 rushing yards to Grange's 41 before suffering a head injury in the fourth quarter, while the Tigers won 14–7.

Wilson also led all-star teams in Portland, Oregon and Seattle, agreeing to participate on the conditions that he be paid in advance and game organizers provided an offensive line that could hold off the Bears; he described Chicago as having "the biggest and best line I ever saw on a football field." His teammates for the games consisted of players from the Waterfront Athletic Club who also worked as longshoremen. In Portland, Wilson only appeared on the field for six snaps before leaving prior to halftime in the 60–3 loss. While playing for Seattle, he injured his right leg while tackling Grange as the Bears won 34–0. Wilson's teammate Rollie Corbett broke his leg during the game, leading to Wilson, Grange, and Grange's agent C. C. Pyle setting up a fund to support him; the three donated $50 apiece.

Later in January, Pyle approached Wilson about signing a contract with him worth $15,000. During the summer, Grange and Wilson collaborated on the movie One Minute to Play, with Wilson serving as the antagonist to Grange's team. Due to California's summer heat and the film being set in an autumn Midwest, the film studio struggled to find extras willing to dress in warmer clothing. To solve this, Pyle promoted the movie's climactic final game as a genuine exhibition game with fans dressed in fall attire being granted free admission.

Pyle also enticed Wilson to join the first American Football League as a potential rival for Grange. Pyle named Wilson president of the league's traveling team, the Wildcats, for the upcoming 1926 AFL season. While Wilson was also nominally named the team's owner, Pyle and Grange actually paid the bills and filed the franchise's ownership papers.

Based in Chicago and training in Rock Island, Illinois, Wilson's Wildcats finished fourth in the nine-team league, with Wilson among the leaders in rushing touchdowns.

Upon the demise of the AFL, Wilson joined the Providence Steam Roller of the National Football League, for which he played for three years. The championship year of 1928 featured Wilson as he was credited with five touchdowns and four interceptions as the Steam Roller won its only NFL championship.

== Later life ==
Wilson was elected to the College Football Hall of Fame in 1951. At the time of his death in December 1963, he was a dockworker in San Francisco. Posthumously, Wilson was inducted to the Husky Hall of Fame at the University of Washington in 1980, and the Rose Bowl Hall of Fame in 1991.

He also spent time as a professional wrestler.

== See also ==
- List of gridiron football players who became professional wrestlers
