= George Tully (American football) =

American football player (1904–1980)

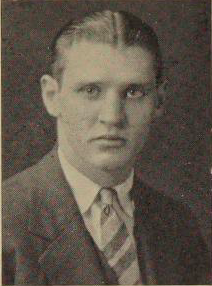
- Tully, c. 1926

No. 10
- Position: End

Personal information
- Born: March 12, 1904; Orange, New Jersey, U.S.
- Died: May 1, 1980 (aged 76); Worcester, Massachusetts, U.S.
- Listed height: 5 ft 10 in (1.78 m)
- Listed weight: 180 lb (82 kg)

Career information
- High school: East Orange (East Orange, New Jersey)
- College: Dartmouth

Career history
- Philadelphia Quakers (1926); Frankford Yellow Jackets (1927)

Awards and highlights
- AFL champion (1926); AFL All-Pro (1926); Consensus All-American (1925); First-team All-Eastern (1925)
- Stats at Pro Football Reference

George Chandler Tully (March 12, 1904 – May 1, 1980) was an American football end who played one season with the Frankford Yellow Jackets of the National Football League (NFL). Tully played football at Dartmouth College. He was a consensus All-American in 1925. He was also a member of the Philadelphia Quakers of the American Football League (AFL).

== Early life ==
George Chandler Tully was born on March 12, 1904, in Orange, New Jersey. He attended East Orange High School in East Orange, New Jersey.

== College career ==
Tully played football at Dartmouth College and was a consensus All-American in 1925. Dartmouth claims the 1925 national championship as does the Alabama Crimson Tide. Tully was one of three consensus All-Americans that represented Dartmouth in 1925. The other two were Carl Diehl and Andy Oberlander.

== Professional career ==
In 1926, Tully played in ten games for the Philadelphia Quakers, and scored one receiving touchdown. The Quakers won the AFL Championship with a record of 8–2. Tully was chosen as an All-Pro by former NFL player Wilfred Smith of the Chicago Tribune, who presented a combined NFL-AFL 1926 All-Pro Team. The AFL folded after one season.

Tully played in one game for the Frankford Yellow Jackets in 1927.

== Personal life ==
Tully served in the United States Army. He died on May 1, 1980, in Worcester, Massachusetts.
