= 1925 Pittsburgh Panthers football team =

American college football season

1925 Pittsburgh Panthers football
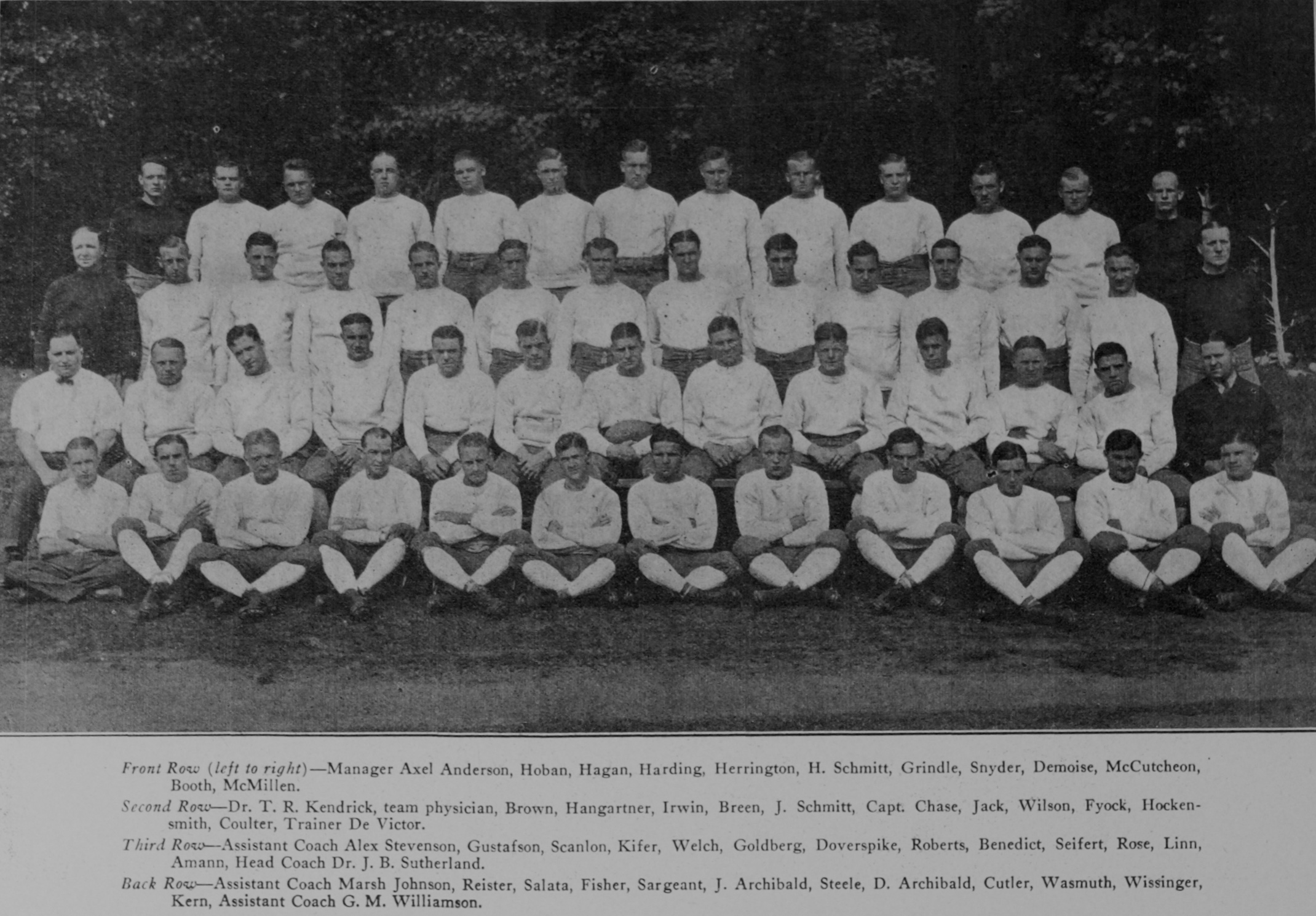
- Conference: Independent
- Record: 8–1
- Head coach: Jock Sutherland (2nd season)
- Offensive scheme: Single-wing
- Captain: Ralph Chase
- Home stadium: Pitt Stadium

1925 Eastern college football independents records
	Conf.			Overall
Team	W	L	T	W		L		T
No. 1 Dartmouth		–		8	–	0	–	0
Fordham		–		9	–	1	–	0
No. 4 Colgate		–		7	–	0	–	2
No. 10 Pittsburgh		–		8	–	1	–	0
Syracuse		–		8	–	1	–	1
No. 11 Lafayette		–		7	–	1	–	1
Springfield		–		6	–	1	–	1
Princeton		–		5	–	1	–	1
Holy Cross		–		8	–	2	–	0
Penn		–		7	–	2	–	0
Army		–		7	–	2	–	0
Boston College		–		6	–	2	–	0
Cornell		–		6	–	2	–	0
NYU		–		6	–	2	–	1
Villanova		–		6	–	2	–	1
Washington & Jefferson		–		6	–	2	–	1
Carnegie Tech		–		5	–	2	–	1
Yale		–		5	–	2	–	1
Bucknell		–		7	–	3	–	1
Columbia		–		6	–	3	–	1
Muhlenberg		–		6	–	3	–	1
Temple		–		5	–	2	–	2
Harvard		–		4	–	3	–	1
Franklin & Marshall		–		5	–	4	–	0
Brown		–		5	–	4	–	1
Penn State		–		4	–	4	–	1
Buffalo		–		3	–	4	–	1
St. John's		–		3	–	4	–	0
Lehigh		–		3	–	5	–	1
Vermont		–		3	–	6	–	0
CCNY		–		2	–	5	–	0
Providence		–		2	–	7	–	0
Rutgers		–		2	–	7	–	0
Boston University		–		1	–	5	–	0
Manhattan		–		1	–	6	–	1
Tufts		–		1	–	6	–	0
Drexel		–		1	–	7	–	0
Rankings from Dickinson System

The 1925 Pittsburgh Panthers football team was an American football team that represented the University of Pittsburgh as an independent during the 1925 college football season. In its second season under head coach Jock Sutherland, the team compiled an 8–1 record and outscored opponents by a total of 151 to 34. The team was ranked No. 10 in the nation in the Dickinson System ratings released in January 1926. This was the Panthers' first season at Pitt Stadium, and the team played eight of its nine games there.

Halfback Andy Gustafson scored the first touchdown at Pitt Stadium. He was later inducted into the College Football Hall of Fame. Tackle Ralph Chase was a consensus first-team player on the 1925 All-America team.

== Schedule ==
Date	Opponent	Site	Result	Attendance	Source
September 26	Washington and Lee	Pitt Stadium; Pittsburgh, PA	W 28–0	20,000 - 25,000	
October 3	Lafayette	Pitt Stadium; Pittsburgh, PA	L 9–20	30,000	
October 10	West Virginia	Pitt Stadium; Pittsburgh, PA (rivalry)	W 15–7	25,000	
October 17	Gettysburg	Pitt Stadium; Pittsburgh, PA	W 13–0	25,000	
October 24	Carnegie Tech	Pitt Stadium; Pittsburgh, PA	W 12–0	40,000	
October 31	Johns Hopkins	Pitt Stadium; Pittsburgh, PA	W 31–0		
November 7	Washington & Jefferson	Pitt Stadium; Pittsburgh, PA	W 6–0	30,000	
November 14	at Penn	Franklin Field; Philadelphia, PA	W 14–0	54,000	
November 26	Penn State	Pitt Stadium; Pittsburgh, PA (rivalry)	W 23–7	50,000	

== Preseason ==
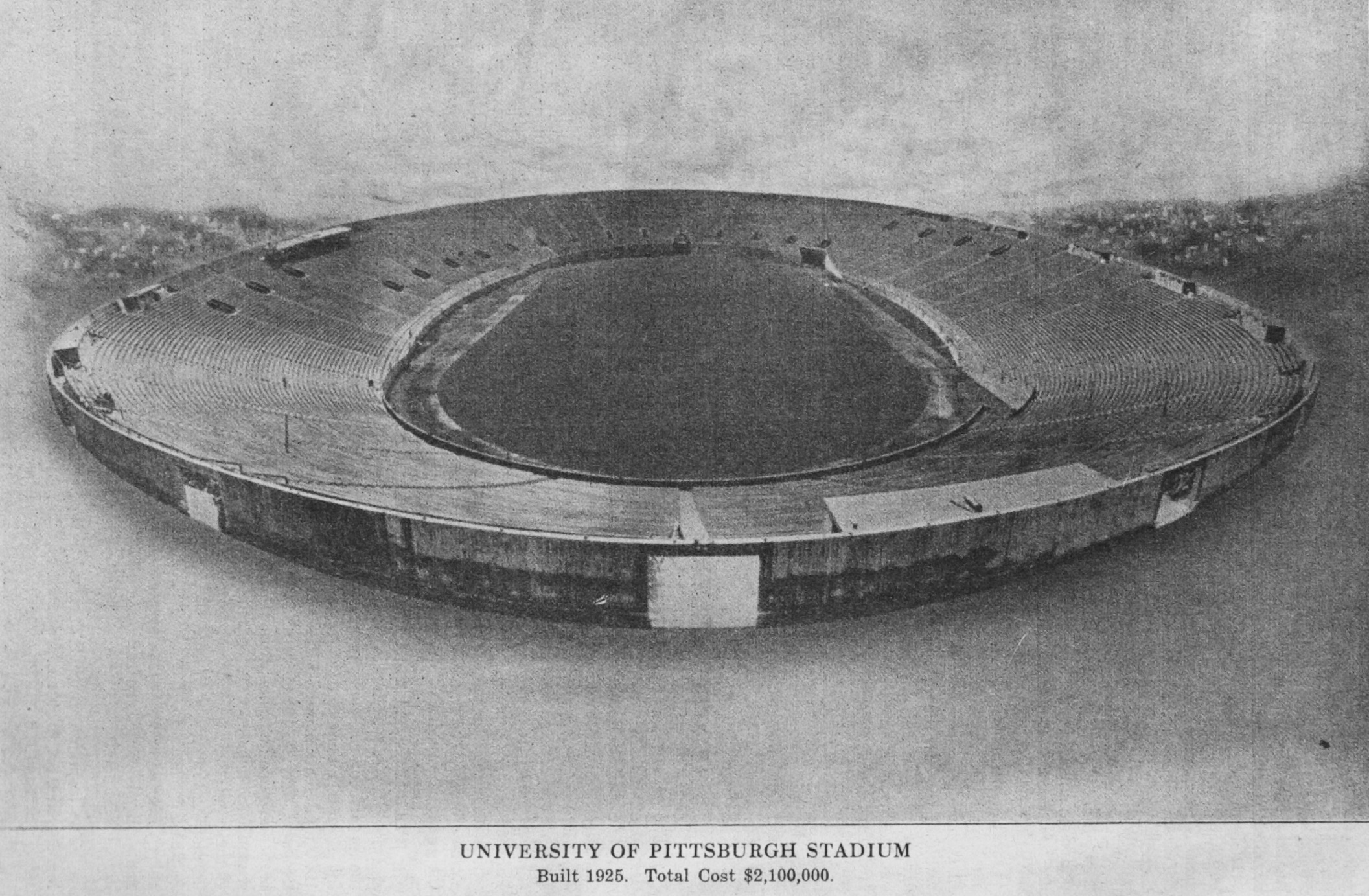
Pitt Stadium - Home of the Panthers

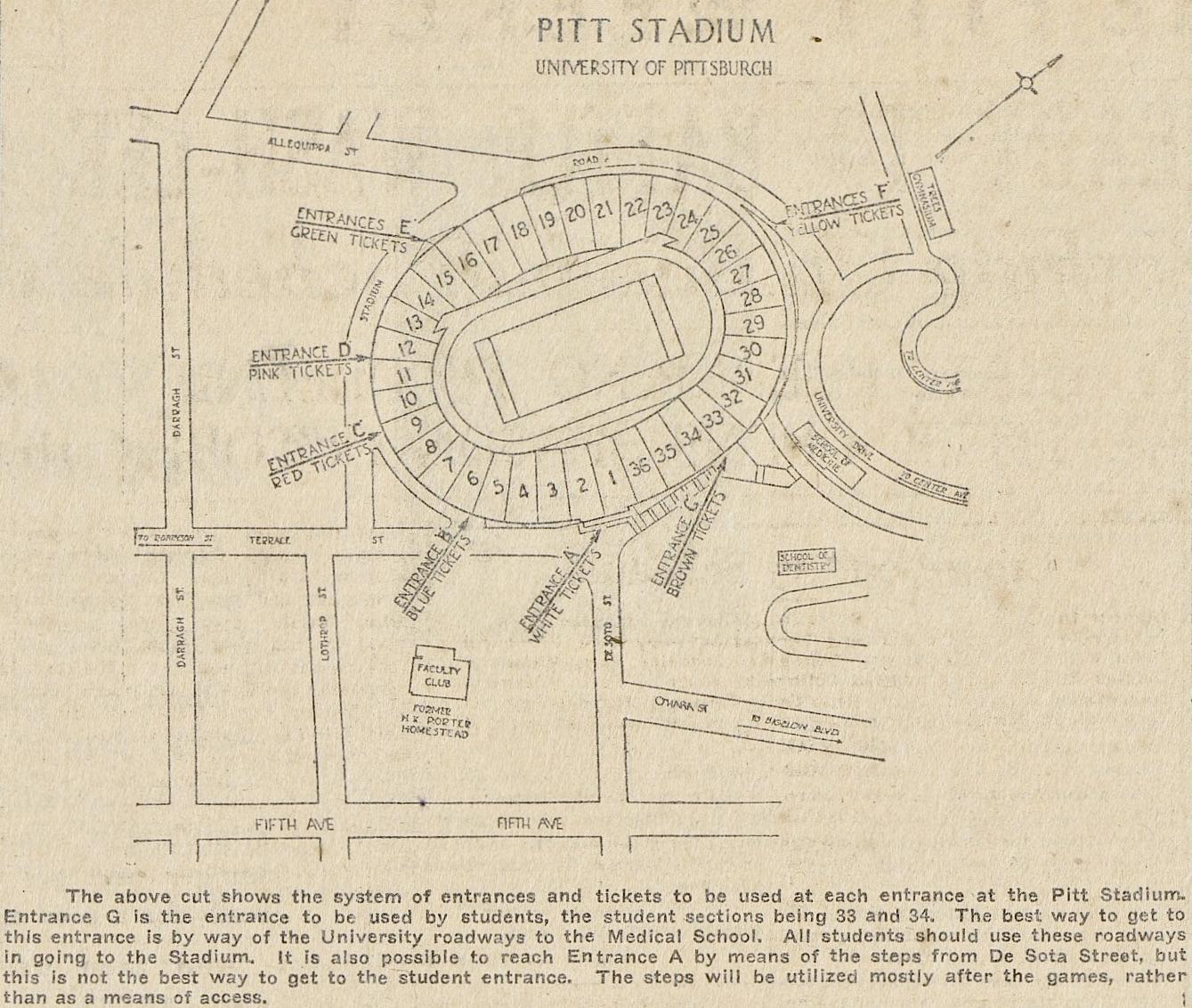
How to Find Your Seat

“Although the results of Pitt's 1924 season were one loss less than those of the previous season, many of the followers of the team were bitterly disappointed. People always seem to expect wonders immediately from a new man in a new job, and these fans were not exceptions in the case of Sutherland. The wolves began to howl, and some very unfavorable comments were made. Jock did not mind the criticisms hurled at him half as much as the remarks about his boys. He was hurt by the things said about his players, whom he defended at every turn, insisting that they had done the best they could.”

“The pressure for success had to be felt by the coaching staff as 1925 would also mark the opening of the school's new magnificent $2.1 million stadium. The stadium had an original capacity of 69,400. The problem with the facility was the original budget called for the stadium to be constructed for almost half that amount, $1.1 million. Chancellor Bowman was incensed at the increased debt that had occurred and he named an athletic director...Don Harrison, to oversee the department and rein in an out-of-control football program.” The Panthers scheduled high-level opponents and recruited top-notch talent by offering an average of $55.00 a month plus tuition and books. “In essence they were paying players to play college football, a situation that as years went on would cause the university major issues. The strategy worked incredibly, better than probably Sutherland and Harrison could have hoped.”

In early April, Coach Sutherland ran his second spring football practice session. “The spring practice was productive of much good and everyone was pleased with the fine spirit the men displayed and the way they entered into the practice work. Coach Sutherland urged all the candidates to get in some sort of athletic work for the rest of the year and many will be out for the track team.”

“The University of Pittsburgh football squad formally opened its most important season – stadium year – at Camp Hamilton this afternoon (August 31) when 84 men, players, managers and coaches arrived tonight for a late dinner in camp. The squad traveled in a special car over the Pennsylvania lines to Johnstown, rode to Windber on a chartered street car, then to this site in 20 automobiles donated by the townspeople.” Coach Sutherland's second preseason camp workouts ended on Saturday, September 19, so the squad could return to Pittsburgh for the start of classes on Monday.

"The contractors on the stadium have completed their work, up to schedule. The big structure is all spick and span, and next Saturday it is the hope of the management that it will be crowded to the exits.” The stadium (seventh largest in the country) is immense – it covers more than 9 acres of area; it is 791 feet long and 617 feet wide and it has 36 sections for seating with 55 rows of seats (17 miles of seats). “In construction 2,200 tons of structural steel, 1,000 tons of reinforcing steel, and 20,000 cubic yards of concrete were used.” The stadium will also be used by the baseball, basketball, track, and tennis teams.

== Coaching staff ==
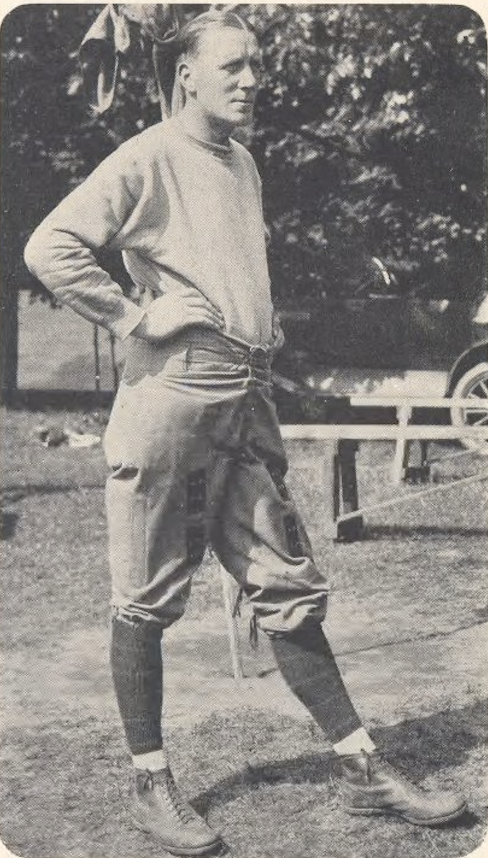
Coach "Jock" Sutherland

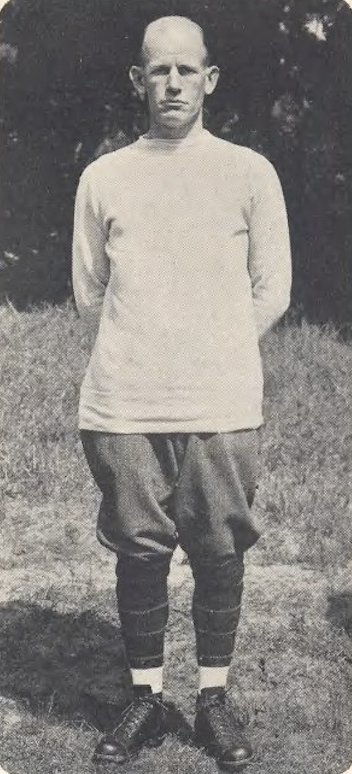
Coach Williamson

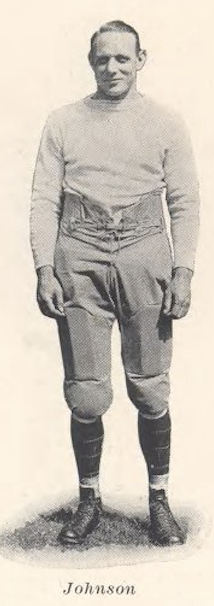
Marsh Johnson

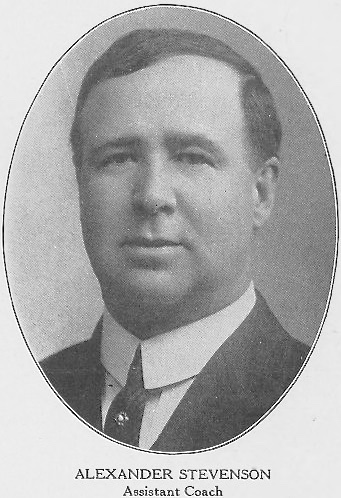
Alexander Stevenson

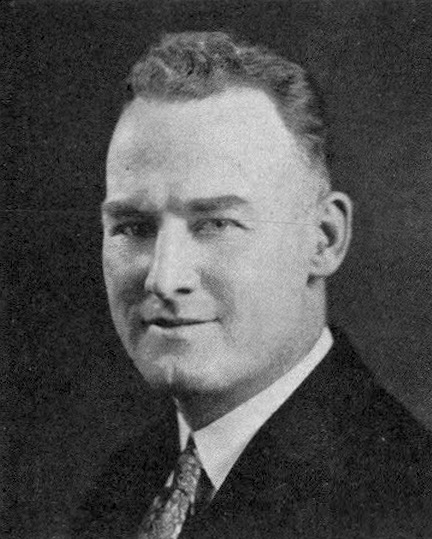
H. Clifford Carlson

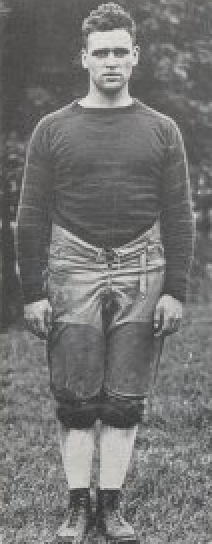
Paul Templeton

1925 Pittsburgh Panthers football staff
Coaching staff: John B. "Jock" Sutherland – Head coach; Guy “Chalky” Williamson – Assistant coach; Marsh Johnson – Assistant coach; Alexander Stevenson – Assistant coach; H. Clifford Carlson – head freshman coach; Paul Templeton – assistant freshman coach	Support staff: Axel J. Anderson– student football manager; Thomas R. Kendrick – team physician; Ollie DeVictor – team trainer; Karl E. Davis – graduate manager of athletics; George I. Carson – assistant graduate manager

== Roster ==
1925 Pittsburgh Panthers football roster
Player	Position	Games	Height	Weight	Age	Class	Prep School
Ralph Chase*	captain/tackle	7	6' 4"	199	21	1926	Wyoming Seminary
Alfred Amann	quarterback	2	5' 9"	171	21	1927	Bellefonte Academy
David Archibald	end	0	6'	192	21	1927	Westinghouse H. S.
Joseph A. Archibald	guard	0	6' 1"	165	21	1927	Bellefonte Academy
Frank J. Benedict*	center	5	6'	175	20	1926	Midland H. S.
Allan A. Booth*	fullback	8	5' 8"	190	21	1928	Sharon H. S.
John P. Breen	center	3	5' 10"	155	21	1928	New Brighton H. S.
Jesse J. Brown*	halfback	7	5' 11"	175	21	1926	Nichols Prep (Buffalo, NY)
Wallace Coulter	fullback	4	5' 11"	170	21	1927	Crafton H. S.
Andy A. Cutler*	quarterback	6	6'	190	20	1928	Bellefonte Academy
Felix F. Demoise*	end	9	5' 11"	160	22	1928	Greensburg H. S.
Chester D. Doverspike	tackle	1	6'	175	19	1928	New Bethlehem H. S.
Paul R. Fisher	guard	5	6'	180	19	1928	Avalon H. S.
Dwight W. Fyock	fullback	2	5' 10"	162	21	1928	Johnstown H. S.
Richard Goldberg	center	5	6'	185	20	1928	Slippery Rock Normal
John E. Grindle	halfback	2	5' 7"	158	22	1928	Potomac State
Andrew C. Gustafson*	fullback	8	6'	191	22	1926	West Aurora H. S. (Aurora, IL)
James Hagan*	halfback	5	5' 9"	169	20	1928	Windber H. S.
Ulhardt Hangartner*	guard	3	5' 11"	195	22	1926	Schenley H. S.
John J. Harding*	halfback	7	5' 9"	155	22	1926	Wyoming Seminary
Lee R. Herrington	halfback	1	5' 8"	152	20	1927	Uniontown H. S.
Walter Hoban	halfback	4	5' 9"	155	21	1928	Sharpsville H. S.
W. D. Hockensmith	center	0	5' 10"	175	20	1928	Culver Military Academy
Robert L. Irwin*	halfback	8	5' 11"	159	22	1926	Bellefonte H. S.
Clyde A. Jack	end	4	5' 10"	171	21	1927	The Kiski School
William Kern*	tackle	7	6'	188	20	1928	Wyoming Seminary
John J. Kifer*	end	7	5' 11"	163	22	1926	Norwin H. S.
Howard Linn*	guard	6	5' 11"	214	22	1927	Bellefonte Academy
Carl W. McCutcheon*	halfback	8	5' 9"	151	22	1926	East Liverpool H. S.
Blair V. McMillin*	end	7	5' 11"	167	19	1927	Wilkinsburg H. S.
Herman Reister	guard	1	6'	195	19	1927	Westinghouse H. S.
John A. Roberts*	end	7	6' 1"	187	19	1927	Parkersburg H. S.
Robert S. Rose	halfback	0	5' 11"	165	20	1927	Schenley H. S.
Andrew J. Salata*	tackle	8	5' 10"	195	21	1928	Wyoming Seminary
Philip Sargeant	end	3	6'	180	19	1928	New Castle H. S.
James A. Scanlon	end	5	6'	177	21	1928	The Kiski School
Henry Schmitt	halfback	2	5' 7"	135	22	1927	Donora H. S.
Joseph Schmitt*	halfback	9	5' 11"	154	21	1927	The Kiski School
Edward Seifert	guard	1	5' 11"	195	19	1928	Schenley H. S.
Floyd Snyder	quarterback	1	5' 8"	175	21	1927	Wilkinsburg H. S.
Wendell Steele*	guard	7	6' 2"	184	21	1926	South Hills H. S.
Chester H. Wasmuth	tackle	3	5' 11"	200	20	1928	Union H. S.
Gilbert L. Welch*	halfback	8	5' 11"	165	21	1928	Parkersburg H. S.
Theodore Wilson	end	1	5'11"	170	20	1927	Wilkinsburg H. S.
Zoner A. Wissinger*	tackle	7	6'	195	21	1926	Greenville H. S.
Axel J. Anderson*	manager					1926	Bellefonte Academy
* Letterman

== Game summaries ==
=== Washington & Lee ===
Week 1: Washington & Lee at Pitt

Team	1	2	3	4	Total
Washington & Lee	0	0	0	0	0
• Pitt	7	14	0	7	28

- Date: September 26, 1925
- Location: Pitt Stadium
  Pittsburgh, PA
- Game start: 2:30 p.m.
- Game attendance: 20,000-25,000
- Game weather: sunny
- Referee: Walter Eckersall (University of Chicago)

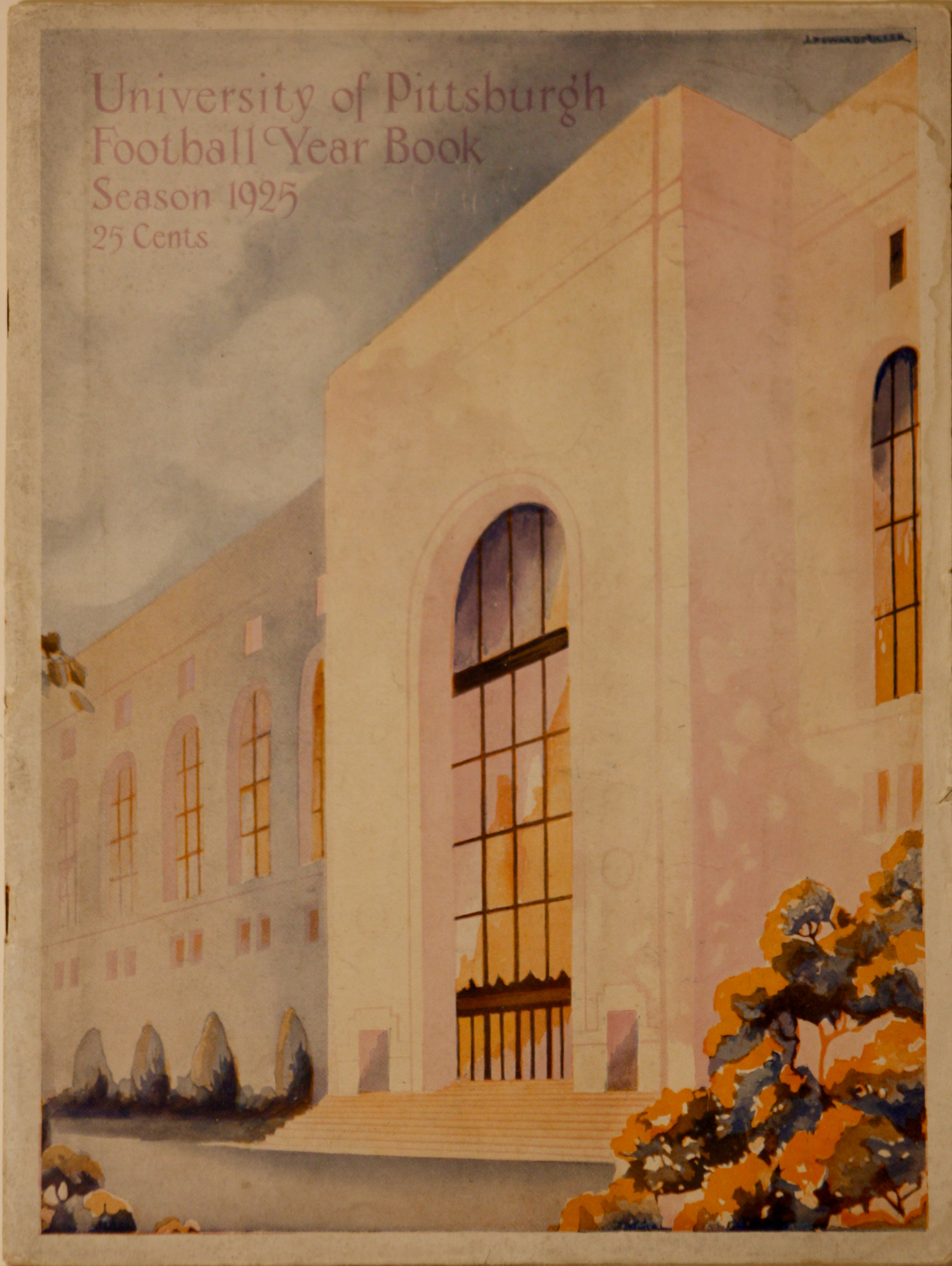
Program for September 26, 1925 Pitt vs. Washington & Lee game

The Pitt Panthers welcomed the Washington & Lee Generals to inaugurate their new stadium. This was the only time the schools met on the gridiron. James DeHart, a 4-sport letter winner at Pitt and teammate of Coach Sutherland, was in his fourth year at the helm of the Generals. His 3-year record was a respectable 17–8–3. The Generals were without their starting end, captain James K. Thomas, their starting tackle, Tex Tilson, and backfield ace, Palmer, due to injuries.

The Pittsburgh Post reported that Pitt would have three new faces in the starting lineup. Frank Benedict, last year's backup to Marsh Johnson at center, and two rookies from the freshmen team, Andrew Salata at tackle and Gilbert “Gibby” Welch at halfback were penciled in for the first game. "Usually secretive, melancholy and dejected, Coach Jock Sutherland, starting his second year in charge of the alma mater, was no different yesterday. With a veteran team of nine, and strengthened by the acquisition of Salata and Welch, last year's freshmen stars, (he) was hopeful of victory, but rather uncertain as to how his team would act, despite the grilling drills of the past few weeks."

Regis M. Welsh of The Pittsburgh Post reported: "Speedy, flashy, strong in spots, taking advantage of scoring breaks, then making enough mistakes to show its own immaturity, the Pitt Panther, romping like wild on its new turf field, and with an admiring and perspiring crowd of almost 20,000 looking on scored a decisive, but not too impressive victory over Washington and Lee yesterday afternoon in the giant bowl, 28–0. Starting with a team of nine veterans and two graduates from last year's freshmen and winding up with the injection of so many substitutes that it would have made Knute Rockne seasick, the Panthers scored four times, twice on blocked kicks and twice by their own plunging and end skirting."

Early in the first period the Pitt offense advanced the ball by both running plays and short passes. Andy Gustafson culminated the drive by bulling his way into the end zone from the one-yard line for the first score in the new stadium. He tacked on the extra point and Pitt led 7–0. The Pitt defense stood out in the second quarter. First, Ralph Chase blocked a punt and recovered it in the end zone for six points and Gustafson added the point after. Then, later in the half, Pitt had the Generals again pinned deep in their own territory when James Scanlon and Wendell Steele broke through and blocked the Generals' punt. Steele fell on it for another six points and Allan Booth, Gustafson's replacement, nailed the conversion for a 21–0 halftime lead. The only scoring in the second half was a 20-yard scamper around end by halfback Joseph Schmitt. Booth kicked the extra point to close the scoring for the day. The Generals finished DeHart's last season with a 5–5 record.

The Pitt lineup for the game against Washington & Lee was Blair McMillin (left end), Zoner Wissinger (left tackle), Wendell Steele (left guard), Frank Benedict (center), Ulardt Hangartner (right guard), Ralph Chase (right tackle), John Kifer (right end), Jesse Brown (quarterback), Gilbert Welch (left halfback), John Harding (right halfback) and Andy Gustafson (fullback). Substitutes appearing in the game for Pitt were Felix Demoise, James Scanlon, William Kern, Joseph Schmitt, Robert Irwin, Allan Booth, Carl McCutcheon, Richard Goldberg, Paul Fisher, Joseph Archibald, Clyde Jack, Herman Reister, John Roberts, Philip Sargeant, James Hagan, Walter Hoban, John Grindle, Dwight Fyock, Ted Wilson and John Breen.

=== Lafayette ===
Week 2: Lafayette at Pitt

Team	1	2	3	4	Total
• Lafayette	0	7	7	6	20
Pitt	3	6	0	0	9

- Date: October 3, 1925
- Location: Pitt Stadium
  Pittsburgh, PA
- Game start: 2:30 p.m.
- Game attendance: 30,000
- Referee: Al Sharpe (Yale)

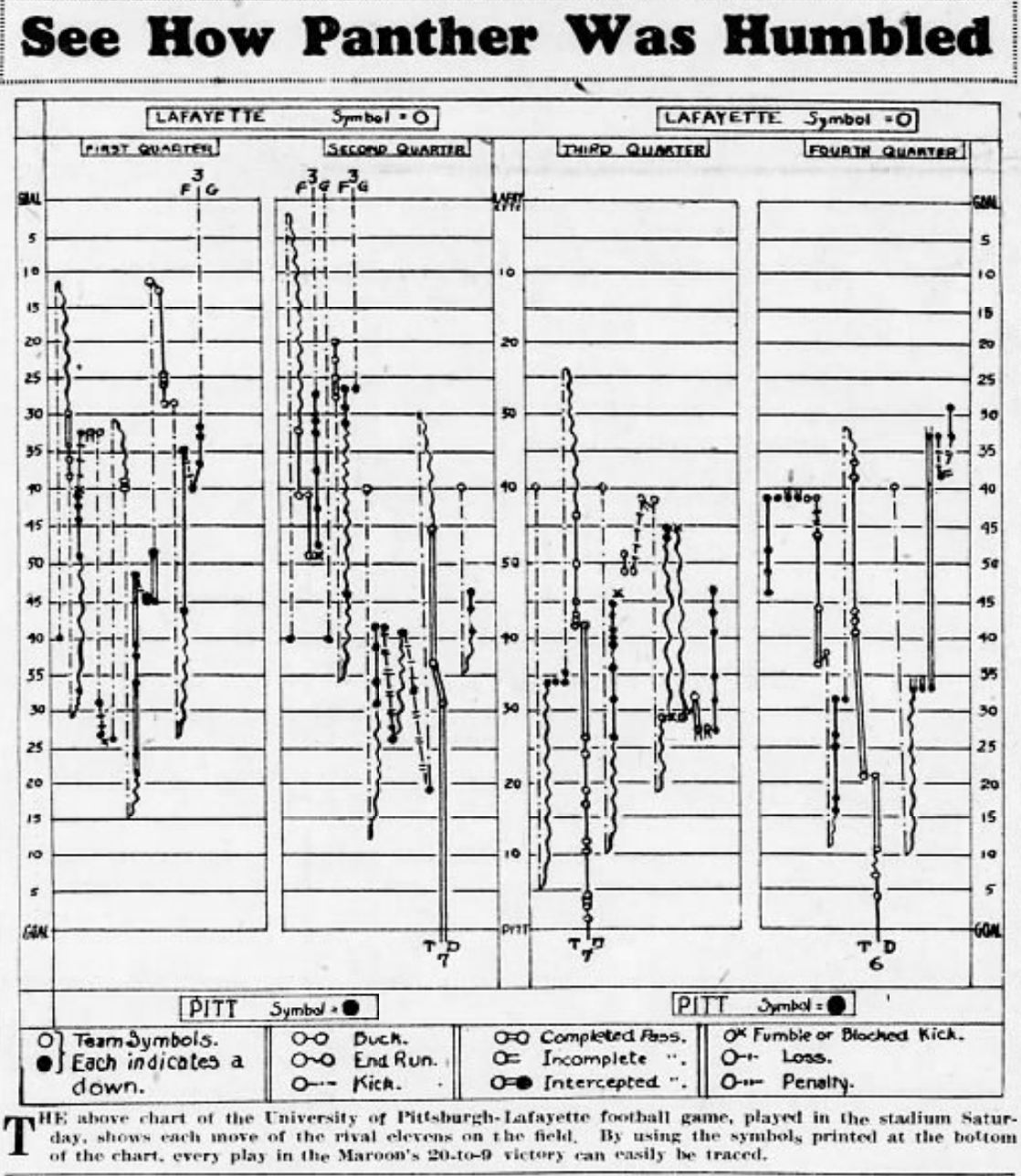
Play-By-Play Chart for October 3, 1925 Pitt vs. Lafayette game

For the fifth year in a row, Lafayette College from Easton, PA. was the second game on the schedule. The series with Lafayette was tied at three victories apiece. Former Pitt star Herb McCracken was in his second year at the helm, having led the Maroon to a 10–0 win over Pitt and final record of 7–2 in 1924. Lafayette opened their 1925 slate with a 20–14 win over Muhlenberg. Lafayette lost All-America end Berry and stalwart guard Budd from the line to graduation. "The Maroon however, will flash a powerful backfield with Kirkleski, Marsh, Gebhardt, Moore and Millman – a quintet of fast steppers – in harness."

"Pitt, however, with its great line, well-balanced backfield and wealth of reserve strength is being made the favorite, and it is generally admitted that a victory for the visitors would be a startling turnover of the advance dope."

David Finoli wrote "As much as Pitt wanted this to be a measuring stick to show how they'd improved, what happened was just the opposite. After spotting the Panthers an early 9–0 lead, Lafayette thoroughly controlled the contest, scoring 20 unanswered points and handing Pitt their worst loss in six years, 20–9."

Andy Gustafson converted three field goals in the first twenty minutes of the game from 27, 33, and 34 yards. Pitt led 9 to 0 and then the Lafayette offense controlled the game. Kirkleski returned a punt to his 46-yard line. Three straight passes resulted in a touchdown. Ford converted the extra point and Pitt led at the half 9 to 7. Lafayette gained possession early in the second half on their own 44. A 15 play sustained drive ended with Kirkleski barreling over from the two-yard line for the touchdown. Ford added the placement and the Leopards led 14 to 9. Late in the fourth period, Kirkleski bulled his way into the end zone for the final tally and Lafayette went home with the victory 20 to 9. Lafayette finished the season with a 7–1–1 record.

The Pitt lineup for the game against Lafayette was Blair McMillin (left end), Andrew Salata (left tackle), Wendell Steele (left guard), Frank Benedict (center), Zoner Wissinger (right tackle), Ralph Chase (right tackle), John Kifer (right end), John Harding (quarterback), Gilbert Welch (left halfback), Jesse Brown (right halfback) and Andy Gustafson (fullback). Substitutes appearing in the game for Pitt were Felix Demoise, Joseph Schmitt, Carl McCutcheon, William Kern, Robert Irwin, James Scanlon, Richard Goldberg, Allan Booth, Paul Fisher, Ulard Hangartner, Clyde Jack and James Hagan.

=== West Virginia ===
Week 3: West Virginia at Pitt

Team	1	2	3	4	Total
West Virginia	0	0	7	0	7
• Pitt	0	0	6	9	15

- Date: October 10, 1925
- Location: Pitt Stadium
  Pittsburgh, PA
- Game start: 2:30 p.m.
- Game attendance: 25,000
- Referee: Dr. E. J. O'Brien (Tufts)

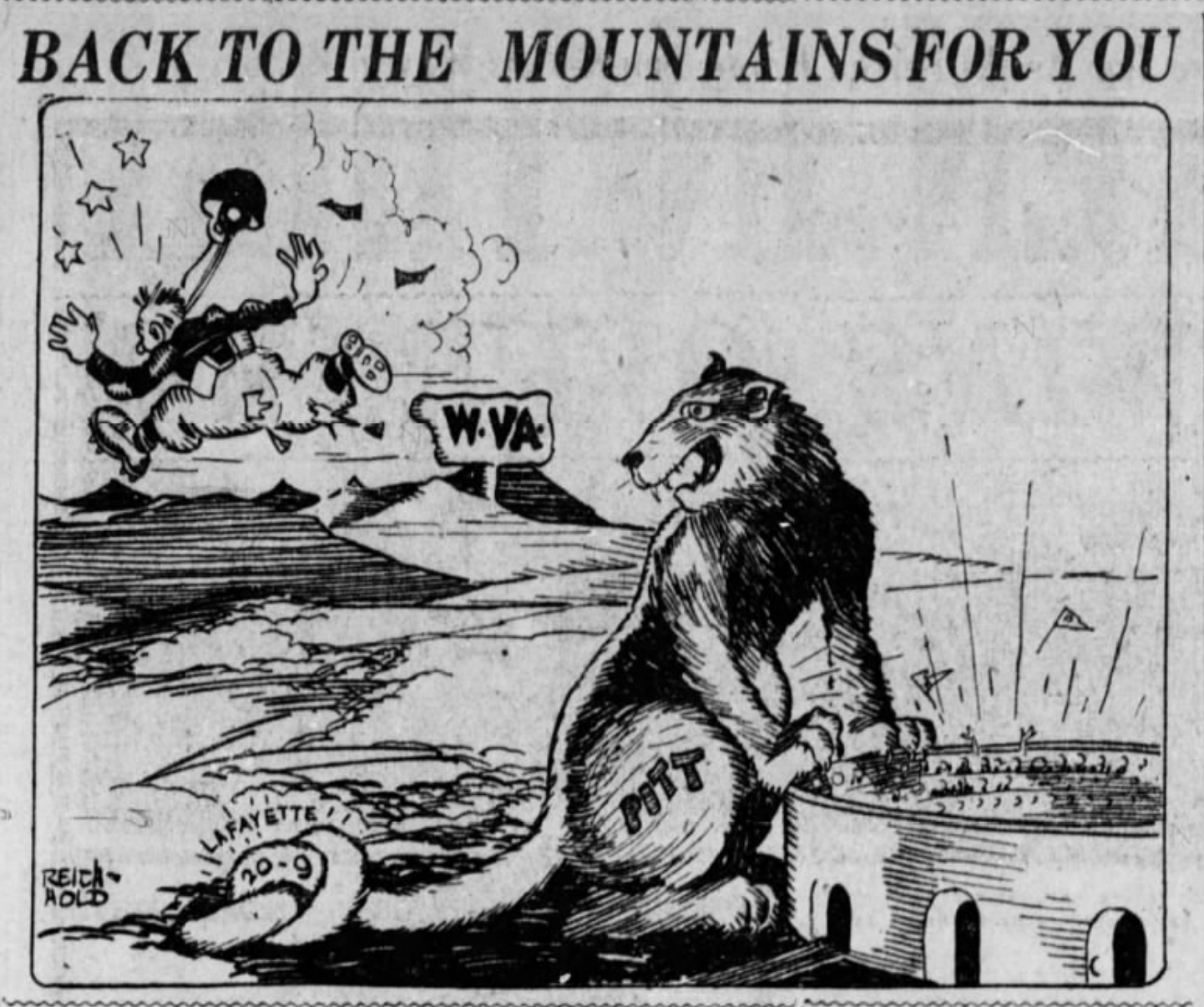
Cartoon for October 10, 1925 Pitt victory over West Virginia

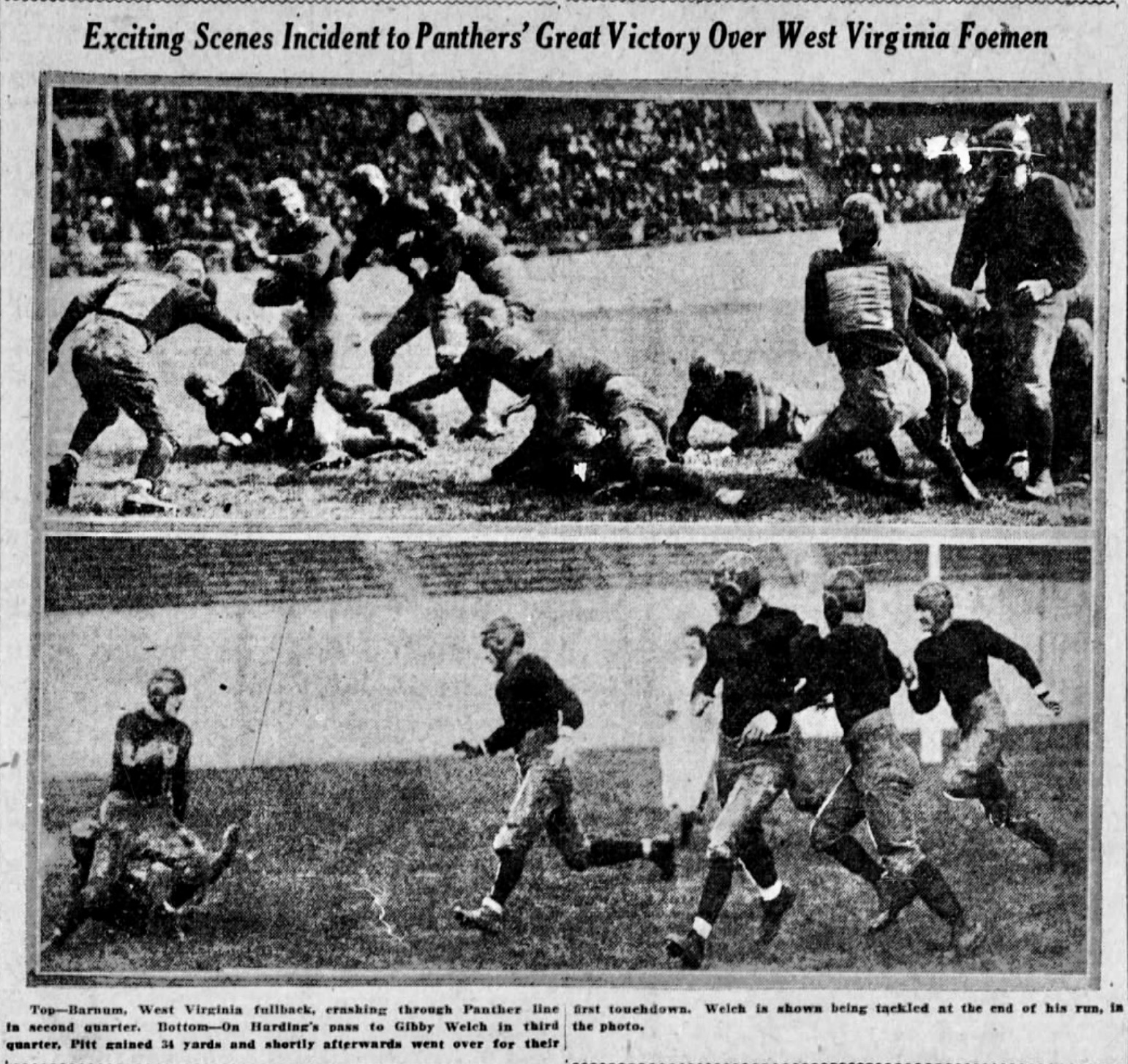
Photos from October 10, 1925 Pitt vs. West Virginia game

The 1925 Mountaineers were led by first year coach Ira Rodgers, a 1919 All-America fullback and College Football Hall of Fame member. The West Virginians were 2–0 on the season and looking to avenge their 14–7 upset loss on Forbes Field the year before. Walter Mahan, All-America guard, anchored the line, but the Mountaineers strength was in the backfield, which included Francis Farley, an excellent passer, Ed Morrison, Doc Bruder and Pete Barnum. "Rogers and his assistants have been working hard to get the Mountaineers ready for the Pitt struggle and though handicapped by lack of reserve material the coaches believe that this year's eleven will trouble the powerful Panther machine."

This was the twenty-first meeting in the "Backyard Brawl" and the series stood at 12–7–1 in Pitt's favor. "The Panthers seem to be thoroughly awakened to the fact that another defeat, following on the heels of the Maroon backset, would be nothing short of a calamity, and the chances are that it will be a bunch of determined, grim fighters who oppose the Morgantowners on Saturday." Coach Sutherland opted for the same lineup that started the Lafayette game.

By refusing to give up and finally reversing form in the last quarter of its annual football game with West Virginia, the Panthers bested the Mountaineers 15–7 in a tightly contested struggle that kept the 25,000 fans enthralled. Max E. Hannum of The Pittsburgh Press touted the hero of the day: "This is the story of a big blond descendent of the Vikings of old, who came out of the west several years ago to gain an education and athletic renown at the University of Pittsburgh. This ambitious young fellow, Andy Gustafson by name, sprang into prominence almost immediately, but he arose to the height of his brilliant career yesterday at Pitt Stadium, when, virtually single-handed, he encompassed the defeat of the Panther's [sic] ancient rival, the West Virginia eleven."

After a scoreless first half the Mountaineers advanced the ball sixty yards with Barnum bulling his way into the end zone for the go-ahead touchdown. He added the extra point to make it 7 to 0. Late in the third quarter the Panthers gained 65 yards through the air to the 3-yard line. Gustafson plunged for the score. A fumbled snap botched the extra point attempt and Pitt trailed 7 to 6 after three quarters. Midway through the final stanza the Pitt offense advanced the ball to the West Virginia 30-yard line. The Mountaineer defense stiffened and Gustafson booted a 36-yard field goal to put Pitt ahead 9 to 7. West Virginia was not finished. Their offense moved the ball to the Pitt 20-yard line. Coach Rodgers replaced Farley with Ryan. Ryan tried to circle around right end but fumbled and Gustafson scooped up the pigskin and did not stop until he crossed the goal line 80 yards away. He missed the placement and Pitt held on to win 15 to 7. West Virginia finished the season with a record of 8 wins and one loss.

The Pitt lineup for the game against West Virginia was Blair McMillin (left end), Andrew Salata (left tackle), Wendell Steele (left guard), Frank Benedict (center), Zoner Wissinger (right guard), Ralph Chase (right tackle), John Kifer (right end), John Harding (quarterback), Gilbert Welch (left halfback), Jesse Brown (right halfback) and Andy Gustafson (fullback). Substitutes appearing in the game for Pitt were Richard Goldberg, James Scanlon, Felix Demoise, Joseph Schmitt, Carl McCutcheon, Ulardt Hangartner, Paul Fisher, Allan Booth and Chester Wasmuth.

=== Gettysburg ===
Week 4: Gettysburg at Pitt

Team	1	2	3	4	Total
Gettysburg	0	0	0	0	0
• Pitt	0	0	0	13	13

- Date: October 17, 1925
- Location: Pitt Stadium
  Pittsburgh, PA
- Game start: 2:30 p.m.
- Game attendance: 25,000
- Game weather: muddy field
- Referee: R. E. Cadigan (Syracuse)

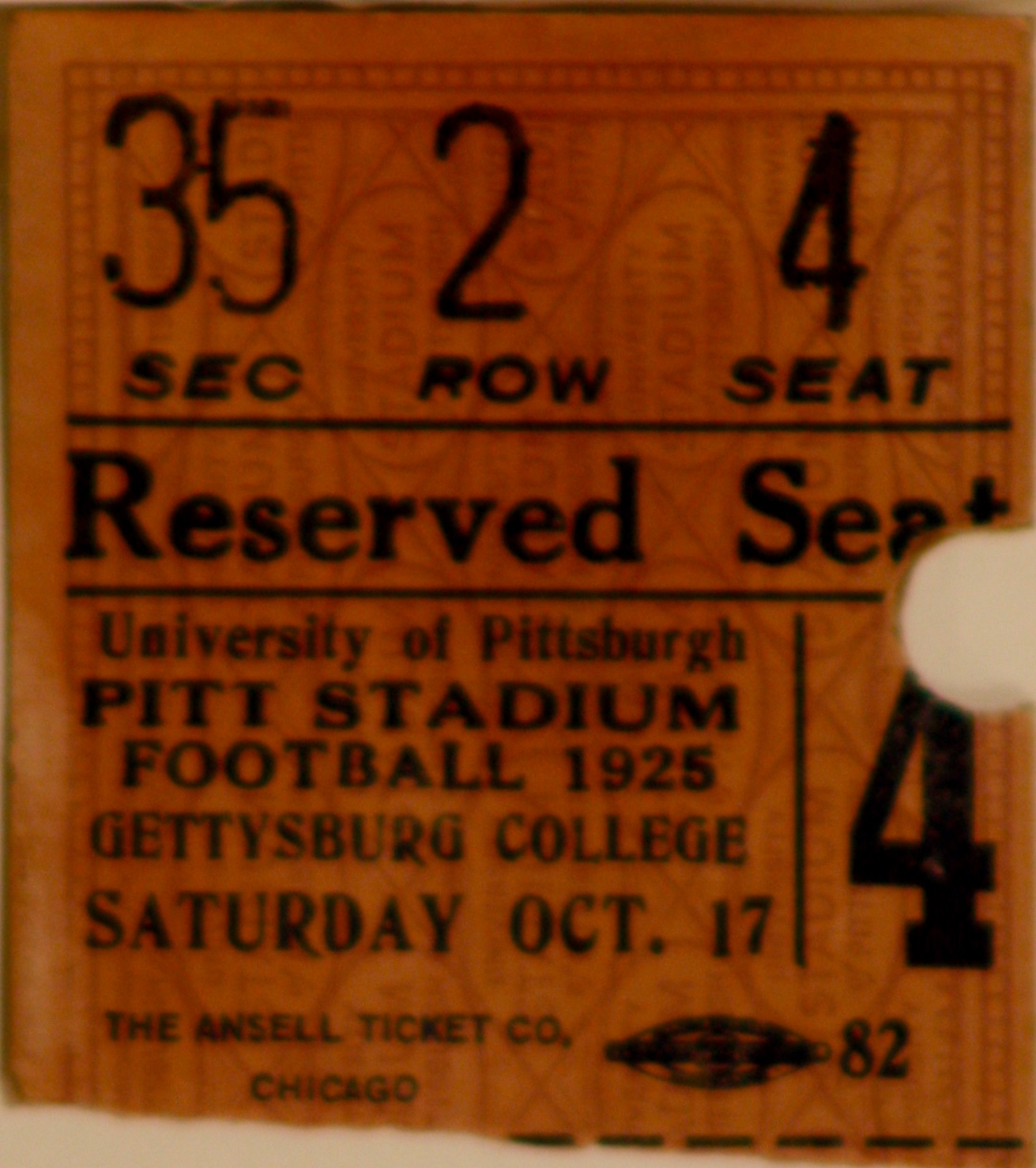
ticket stub for October 17, 1925 Pitt vs. Gettysburg game

Gettysburg College was the fourth game on the schedule and before the season fans looked at it as a filler game in between West Virginia and the "City Championship" versus Carnegie Tech. However, seventh-year Coach Bill Wood's eleven were unbeaten in three games. They clobbered St. John's (MD) 40–0 in their first game, then tied Lehigh 7–7, and followed that up with a 21–0 shutout of Muhlenberg. The Pittsburgh Press noted: "The Gettysburg outfit is far above the 'set-up' class, and the Panthers may be extremely fortunate to escape with whole hides this afternoon."

The Panthers rested several starters who were nursing various injuries. Captain Ralph Chase, Wendell Steele, Richard Goldberg, Blair McMillan and John Harding did not play. The starting lineup only had two regulars – Frank Benedict at center and Andy Gustafson at fullback.

The Pittsburgh Gazette Times reported: "A confident Panther of Pitt, sleek and well fed on Mountaineer meat, chanced on the lean, snarling Blue Ridge timber wolf of Gettysburg at the stadium here yesterday afternoon and in sizzling, mud-soaked death combat barely clawed off with a 13–0 triumph by dint of a desperate final-stanza rally. And it wasn't that the husky Sutherland stars were below par. It wasn't that the field was soggy, slopped to a quagmire by Freshmen and Kiski tusslers in a preliminary joust. It wasn't altogether because the home authorities saw fit to start what might be considered largely a secondary squad. All these factors, to be sure, proved contributory. But the real power behind the remarkable enemy showing was Gettysburg grit."

The boys from the Battlefield stopped the Panthers in the first half. Andy Gustafson fumbled on the Gettysburg 8-yard line. Carl McCutcheon threw an interception on the 24-yard line. Joe Schmitt dropped a pass from Welch in the open field. The first play of the fourth stanza broke the scoreless tie. Gilbert Welch tossed a 7-yard touchdown pass to end John Roberts. Gustafson's extra point attempt struck the cross bar, but Gettysburg was offside and the extra point was allowed. Pitt led 7 to 0. Minutes later the Pitt offense advanced the ball from their 31-yard line to the Gettysburg 5-yard line. Allan Booth, subbing for Gustafson, plunged through the Gettysburg defense for another touchdown. Booth's point after was blocked. Pitt won 13 to 0. Gettysburg finished the season with a respectable 6–1–2 record and only surrendered 3 touchdowns on the season.

The Pitt lineup for the game with Gettysburg was James Scanlon (left end), Andrew Salata (left tackle), Ulardt Hangartner (left guard), Frank Benedict (center), Paul Fisher (right guard), William Kern (right tackle), Felix Demoise (right end), James Hagan (quarterback), Joseph Schmitt (left halfback), Carl McCutcheon (right halfback) and Andy Gustafson (fullback). Substitutes appearing in the game for Pitt were Gilbert Welch, John Roberts, Howard Linn, Robert Irwin, Allan Booth, Clyde Jack, Andy Cutler, Walter Hoban, Chester Wasmuth, John Breen, Wallace Coulter, Philip Sargeant, John Grindle and Henry Schmitt.

=== Carnegie Tech ===
Week 5: Carnegie Tech at Pitt

Team	1	2	3	4	Total
Carnegie Tech	0	0	0	0	0
• Pitt	6	0	6	0	12

- Date: October 24, 1925
- Location: Pitt Stadium
  Pittsburgh, PA
- Game start: 2:30 p.m.
- Game attendance: 40,000
- Game weather: rain
- Referee: G. N. Bankart (Dartmouth)

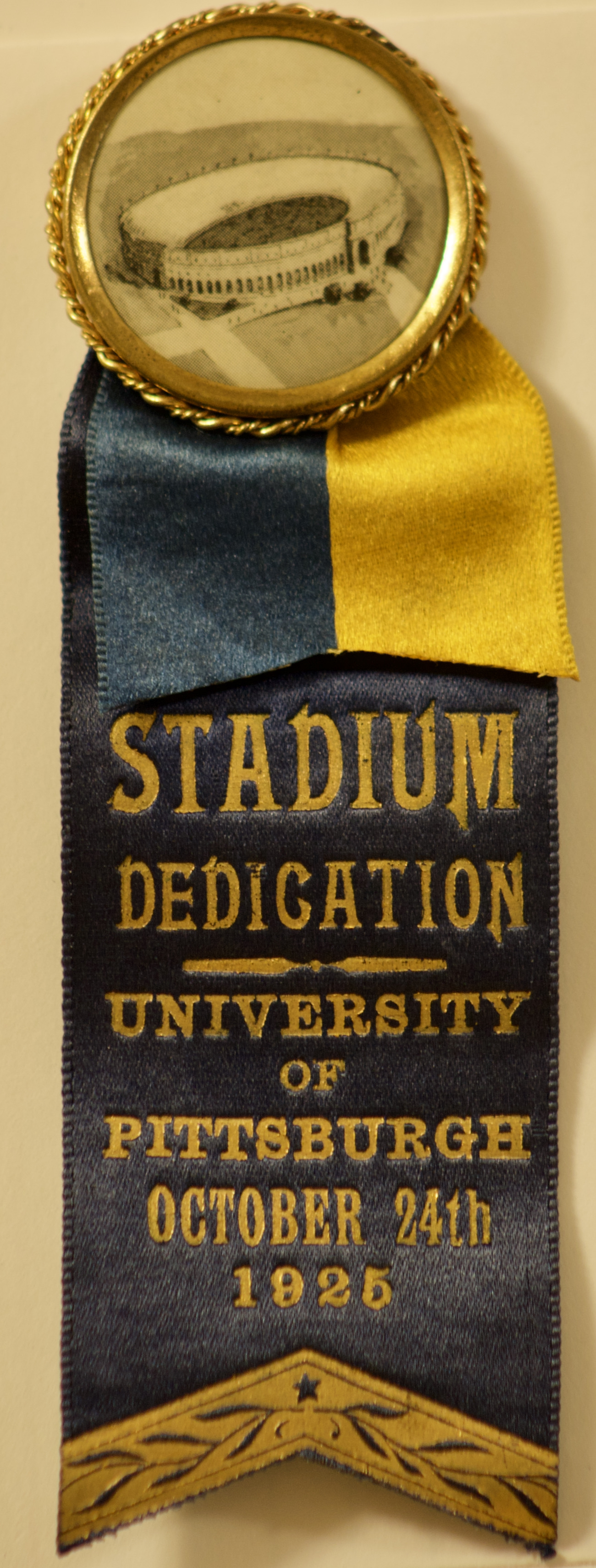
Pitt Stadium dedication pin

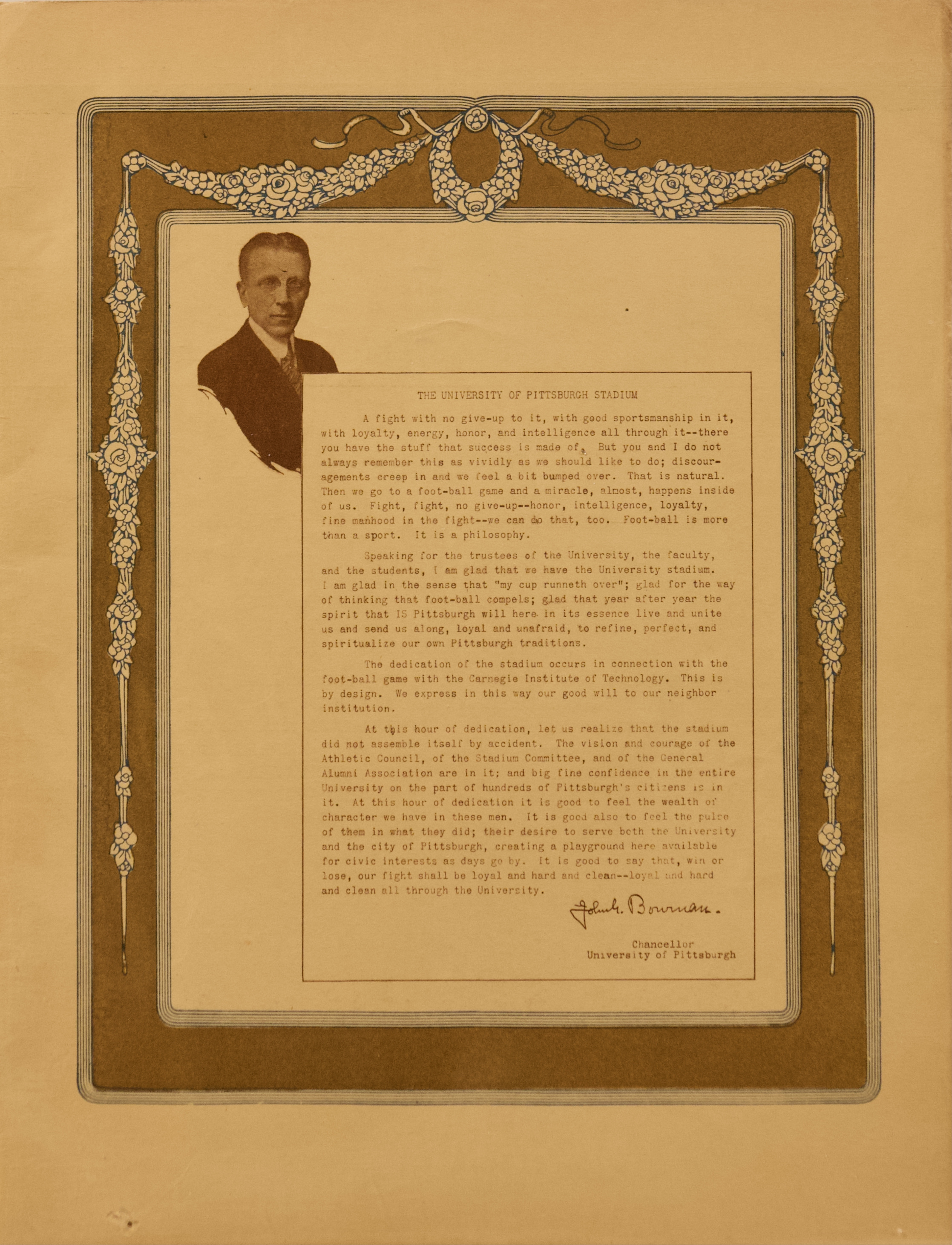
Program for October 24, 1925 Pitt Stadium dedication

"On October 24 at the Carnegie Tech-Pitt game the new stadium was dedicated. It was an appropriate occasion for the dedication, for these two colleges had been rivals, off and on, since 1906, and their contests for the city championship always aroused much interest." Under a steady drizzle the festivities started with a parade of "hundreds of former athletes and scores of well-known men in the civic, business, professional and educational life of the city and nation." Homer D. Williams, president of Carnegie Steel Co. and chairman of the stadium committee presented the stadium to the university, and Chancellor John G. Bowman accepted it. Former Chancellor Samuel B. McCormick gave the invocation. A 21 gun salute was presented by the 107th Field artillery as the American flag and banners of Pitt and Tech were raised.

The Tartans led by tenth year coach, Walter Steffen, were 2–0–1 at this point in the season. They beat Thiel and Mt. Saint Mary's handily and in their previous game held Wash-Jeff to a scoreless tie. Even though Pitt led the city series 9–2, Tech won the last two games against the Panthers. The same lineup that held the Presidents scoreless took the field against the Panthers.

The Panther football team left town for a week in the country prior to the Tech game. The Pitt Weekly editors were not keen on the team's absence from the classroom. But the word from camp was "the Panthers are keyed up as never before on the eve of a clash with Tech. They have had it drilled into them constantly this week that the game is no cinch, and that they must play their heads off if they are to win."

Max E. Hannum of The Pittsburgh Press noted: "There will be nothing but pleasant memories for Pitt men when they think of the day when their great stadium was dedicated. A revived and fighting Panther eleven saw to that when they successfully repelled the attack of the Carnegie Tech forces, carved out an impressive 12 to 0 victory, and regained the city collegiate gridiron title, which had rested in the Tartan camp for two years. Almost 40,000 loyal supporters of both teams braved the elements, and clung to their seats around the great bowl, as an intermittent rain drove over the scene of the conflict throughout the contest."

Mid-first quarter Pitt recovered a Tartan fumble on their own 42-yard line. Andy Gustafson picked up three yards through the right side. On second down, Gilbert Welch dropped back and threw a pass to end John Kifer, which he caught over his head on the Tech 30-yard line, and ran unmolested into the end zone for the touchdown. Gustafson missed the placement and Pitt led 6 to 0. The Tech defense recovered a Welch fumble on the Pitt 14-yard line. Three plays moved the ball to the 6-yard line as time expired in the first period. Tech botched a lateral and Zoner Wissinger broke through the line, scooped up the slippery pigskin and rambled through the mud to the 44-yard line before he was tackled. Tech never threatened again. In the third quarter, a Pitt punt pinned the Tartans on their 2-yard line. They attempted to punt out of danger but the punt was shanked and went out of bounds on the Tech 17-yard line. After a holding penalty against Pitt, Welch hit Kifer with a 21-yard pass completion and first down on the 6-yard line. On fourth down Gustafson plunged into the end zone for the second score from the 1-yard line. The extra point was blocked. Pitt 12 to Tech 0. Coach Sutherland emptied the bench in the last stanza as 23 men participated in the game.

According to The Pittsburgh Sunday Post Coach Sutherland acted unusual after the game - he smiled and he talked: "No, I don't like to say that the better team won. Neither do I like to say the poorer team lost. And about the only thing I can say is that Pitt's team is far better now than it has been any other time during the season. Oh, yes, it's regrettable that the field had to be wet, for without all that rain the game would have been much better and there wouldn't have been all that rough and tumble stuff. It's too bad, too, that Max Bastian had to be out of the game, for his presence would have brought Carnegie to its best strength. Carnegie has a good team. That's why Pitt had to be at its best."

The Pitt lineup for the game against Carnegie Tech was Blair McMillin (left end), Andrew Salata (left tackle), Wendell Steele (left guard), Andy Cutler (center), Zoner Wissinger (right guard), Ralph Chase (right tackle), John Kifer (right end), John Harding (quarterback), Jesse Brown (left halfback), Gilbert Welch (right halfback) and Andy Gustafson (fullback). Substitutes appearing in the game for Pitt were Joseph Schmitt, Felix Demoise, John Roberts, James Hagan, William Kern, Allan Booth, William Coulter, Carl McCutcheon, Paul Fisher, James Hoban, Howard Linn and Robert Irwin.

=== Johns Hopkins ===
Week 6: Johns Hopkins at Pitt

Team	1	2	3	4	Total
Johns Hopkins	0	0	0	0	0
• Pitt	12	12	0	7	31

- Date: October 31, 1925
- Location: Pitt Stadium
  Pittsburgh, PA
- Game start: 2:30 p.m.
- Game weather: muddy
- Referee: R. E. Cadigan (Syracuse)

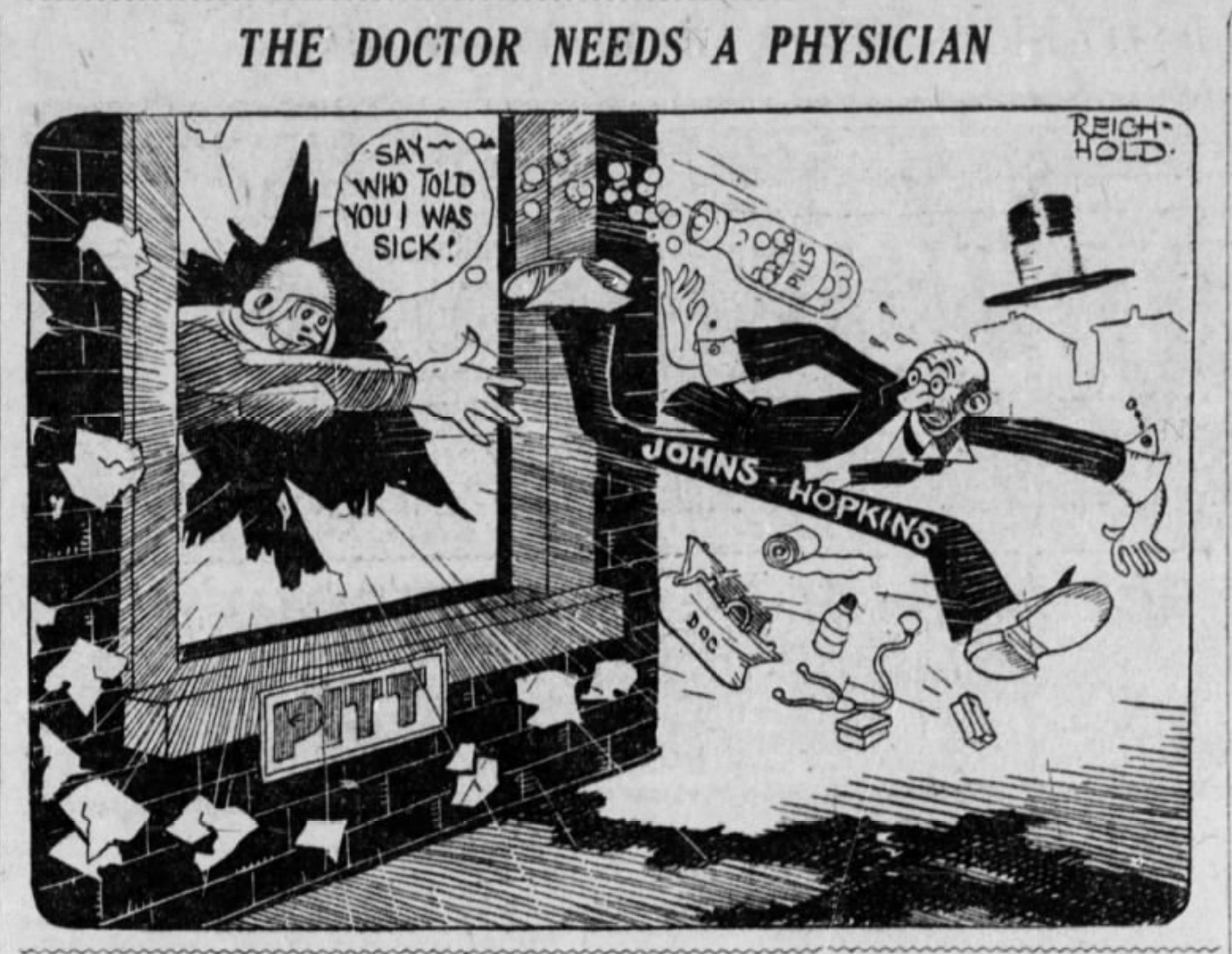
Cartoon for October 31, 1925 Pitt vs. Johns Hopkins game

Graduate Manager Karl Davis scheduled Johns Hopkins as the set-up opponent for the Panthers prior to their final big three games to end the season. After posting a very respectable 5–1–2 record in 1924, sixth-year coach Ray Van Orman brought his 1925 Black and Blue eleven to Pitt Stadium with a 2–2 record. This was the last time Pitt and Johns Hopkins met on the gridiron.

Max E. Hannum of The Pittsburgh Press reported: "Teams scheduled as 'set-up' opponents for institutions that desire only mediocre opposition on the eve of big games, frequently display tendencies to upset instead of taking their planned-for and generally expected trouncings. Johns Hopkins proved an exception to this rule at the Pitt Stadium yesterday, and, opposed by second and third-string members of the Panther squad, eased gently out of the picture by the score of 31 to 0."

"The game was played in a quagmire that made clean handling of the ball impossible...Pitt crossed the visitors' line twice in the opening period and twice in the second quarter and again in the final period." Five different players scored for the Panthers- Allan Booth, Felix Demoise, Carl McCutcheon, John Grindle and Walter Hoban. Hoban added an extra point to close out the scoring. "Captain Walker Taylor was the shining light on the visiting squad, making several fine tackles which kept at least two more touchdowns from being registered."

The Pitt lineup for the game against Johns Hopkins was John Roberts (left end), William Kern (left tackle), Howard Linn (left guard), Andy Cutler (center), John Breen (right guard), Ralph Chase (right tackle), Felix Demoise (right end), James Hagan (quarterback), Joseph Schmitt (left halfback), Carl McCutcheon (right halfback) and Allan Booth (fullback). Substitutes appearing in the game for Pitt were Chester Wasmuth, Walter Hoban, John Grindle, Clyde Jack, James Scanlon, Alfred Amann, Robert Irwin, Wallace Coulter, Edward Seifert, Philip Sargeant, Chester Doverspike, Dwight Fyock, Henry Schmitt, Floyd Snyder and Lee Herrington.

=== Washington & Jefferson ===
Week 7: Washington & Jefferson at Pitt

Team	1	2	3	4	Total
W. & J.	0	0	0	0	0
• Pitt	0	0	0	6	6

- Date: November 7, 1925
- Location: Pitt Stadium
  Pittsburgh, PA
- Game start: 2:00 p.m.
- Game attendance: 30,000
- Game weather: rain
- Referee: E. J. O'Brien (Tufts)

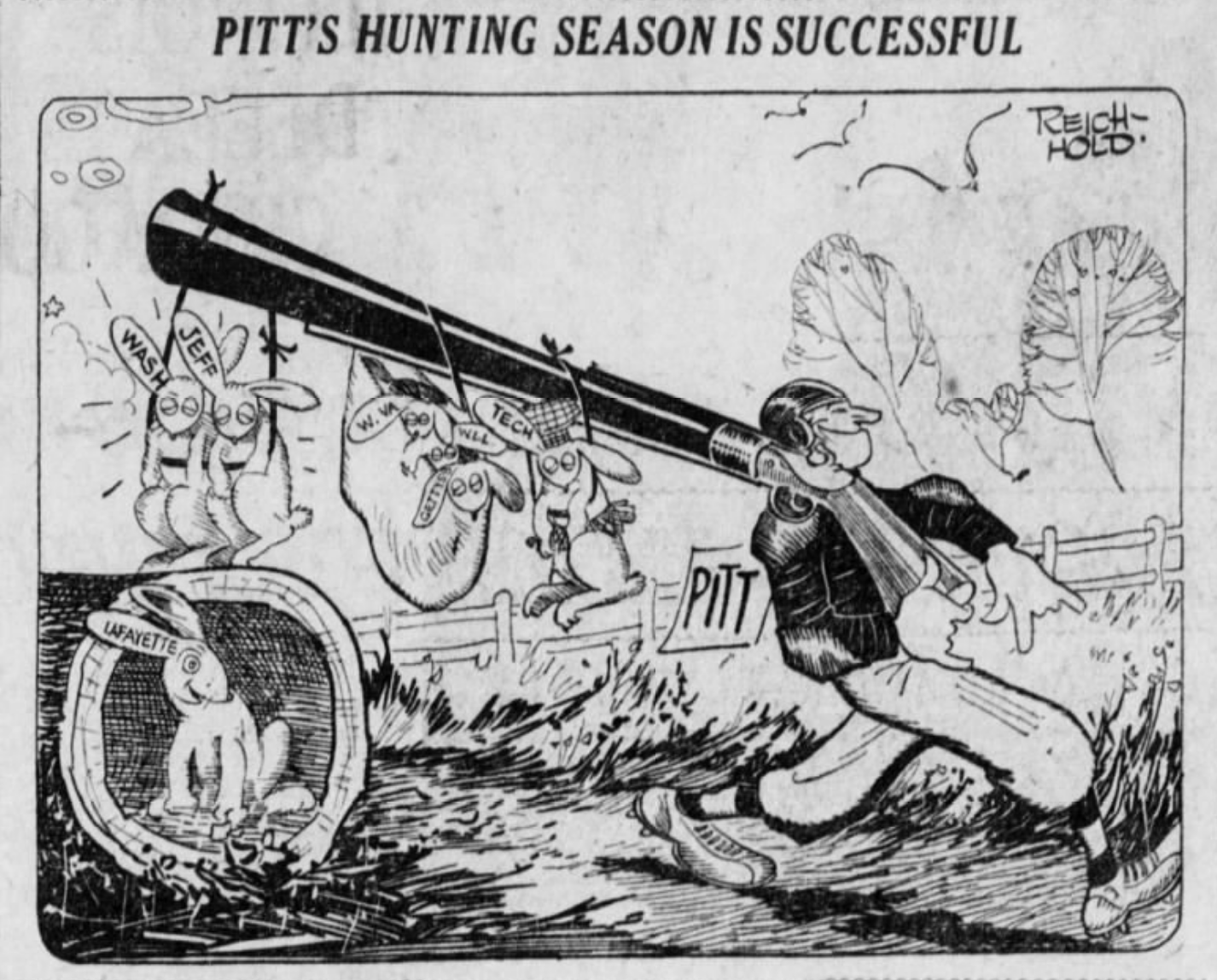
Cartoon celebrating November 7, 1925 Pitt vs. W. & J. game

The unbeaten 1925 Washington & Jefferson Presidents were being compared to the 1916 Pitt Panther "Greatest Eleven in the World" team. Coach David C. Morrow brought his crew to Pitt Stadium with a 5–0–1 record. Their only blemish was a scoreless tie with Carnegie Tech. After beating the Panthers 10–0 last season, the Presidents led the series with Pitt 13–12. "W. & J. will present its strongest lineup, intent on keeping its season's slate clean... Confidence exudes from the camp of the invaders, who can see nothing but a sure W. & J. triumph."

Coach Sutherland will start his strongest eleven. "With the discontented Panther followers snapping at his heels, clipping him from behind and making things miserable for him in their own peculiar way, Jock has nothing left but to whip his team into the best shape of its career, make them play as they never have before and then sit back and await the result. Last night Jock admitted that he was ready- and when Jock admits that much, it is plenty."

Max E. Hannum of The Pittsburgh Press praised the Panthers: "From the mud and slime of an almost impossible gridiron, a fighting and alert Panther rose to its greatest heights of the season yesterday afternoon at the new Pitt stadium. Before 30,000 rabid football enthusiasts, who refused to give up their seats even in the face of a driving rain that drenched every person on the mammoth bowl, and churned the field into a quagmire, the Pitt eleven upset the dope once more, and smashed a valiant and powerful W. & J. team, 6 to 0."

According to The Owl: "Neither team gamed anything through the first three periods and it looked as though the game would end in a scoreless tie...Minutes passed; the battle without results continued in its slow monotonous way. Pitt punted; Wash-Jeff received." But then, with less than five minutes to play, the Sutherland strategy of waiting for a break was rewarded as Pitt blocked a punt by Bill Amos. "Zack" Wissinger secured the slimy pigskin and "never covered 20 yards faster in his life, on either dry or wet field, and he will never cover another 20 yards with such a ringing ovation in his ears."

"The Presidents made 12 first downs to Pitt's 2, but most of their gaining was done in the middle of the field, where it did not count. Not once did W. and J. threaten to score."

Pitt won its fifth game in a row and tied the series with the Presidents at 13 apiece. The Presidents finished the season with a 6–2–1 record.

"In a short but impressive ceremony preceding the kick-off in the stadium yesterday, the University of Pittsburgh presented Washington and Jefferson College a scroll to honor the memory of Robert M. (Mother) Murphy, for years graduate manager of athletics at the Washington (Pa.) institution."

The Pitt lineup for the game against Washington & Jefferson was Blair McMillin (left end), Andrew Salata (left tackle), Wendell Steele (left guard), Andy Cutler (center), Zoner Wissinger (right guard), Ralph Chase (right tackle), John Kifer (right end), John Harding (quarterback), Jesse Brown (left halfback), Gilbert Welch (right halfback) and Andy Gustafson (fullback). Substitutes appearing in the game for Pitt were Richard Goldberg, Joseph Schmitt, Howard Linn, John Roberts, Felix Demoise, and Carl McCutcheon.

=== At Penn ===
Week 8: Pitt at Penn

Team	1	2	3	4	Total
• Pitt	7	7	0	0	14
Penn	0	0	0	0	0

- Date: November 14, 1925
- Location: Franklin Field
  Philadelphia, PA
- Game start: 2:00 p.m.
- Game attendance: 54,000
- Game weather: ideal
- Referee: Tom Thorpe (Columbia)

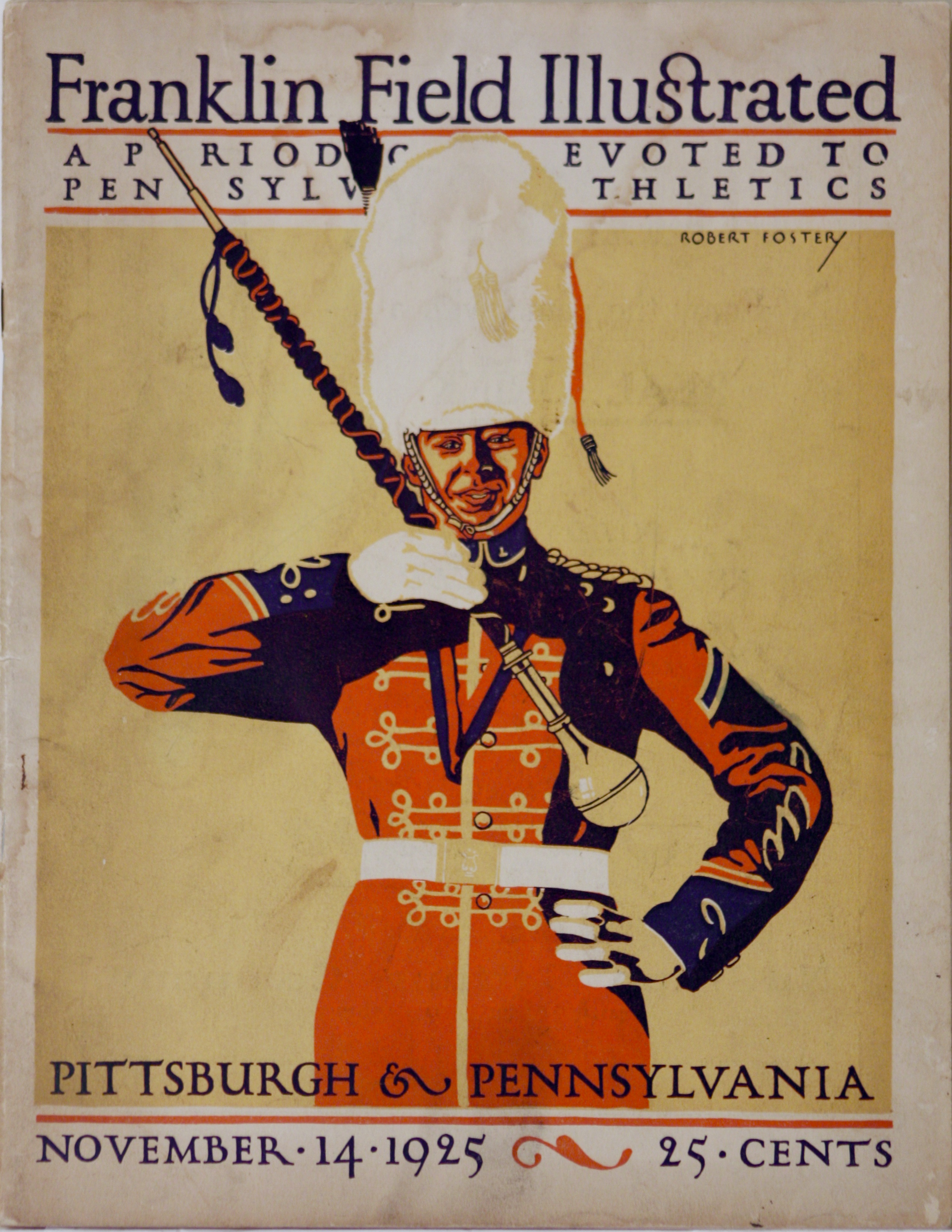
Franklin Field Illustrated for November 14, 1925 Penn vs. Pitt game

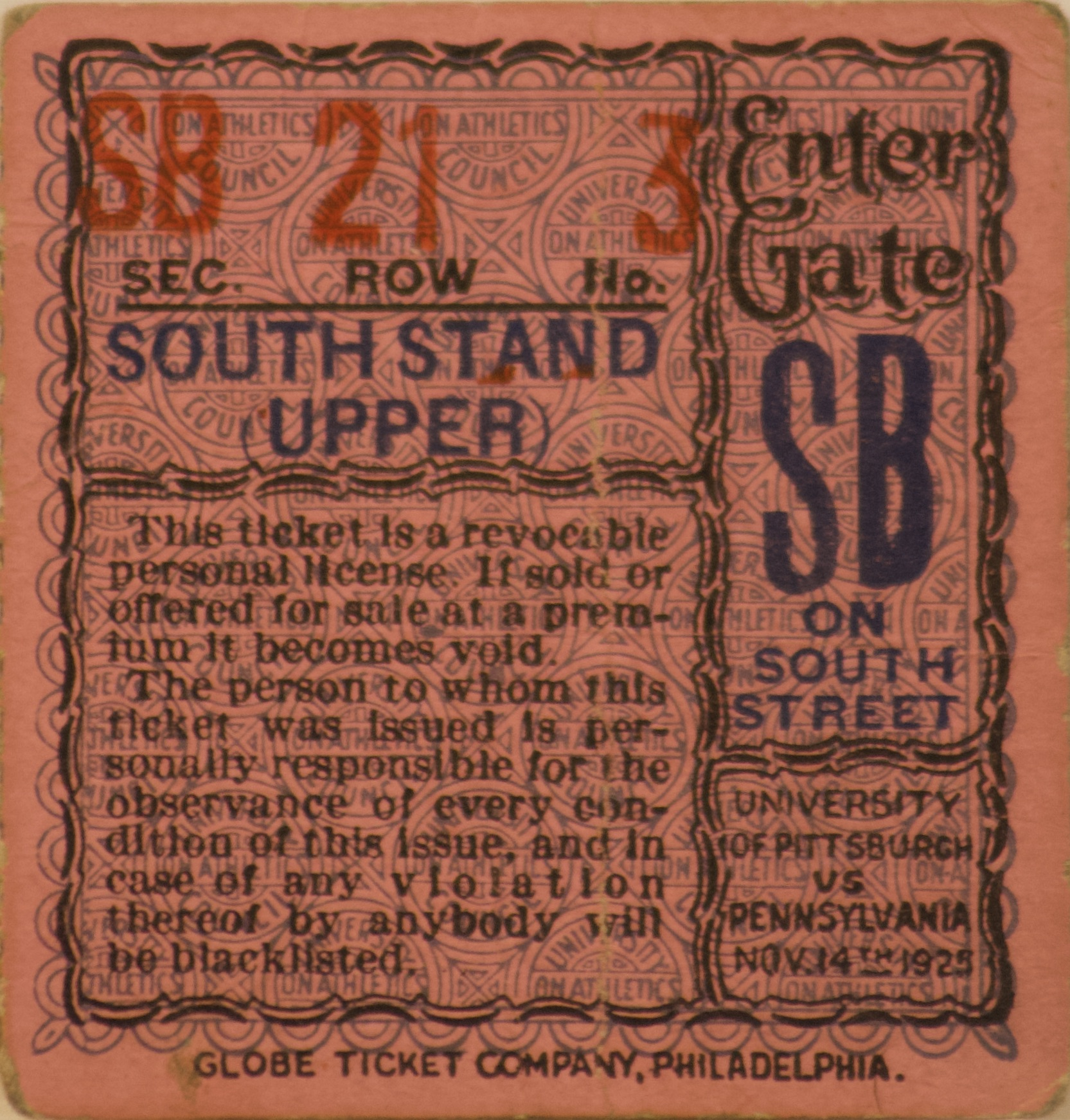
Ticket stub for November 14 game versus Penn

The Panthers only road game of the season was to Philadelphia to meet the Penn Quakers on Franklin Field. Third year coach Lou Young's team sported a 6–1 record. Their only loss was to the Illinois Illini, led by All-American halfback Red Grange, by the score of 24 to 2. Penn has beaten Pitt only once in the nine-game series and the oddsmakers feel this year's game could be another in the win column for the Quakers. The Quakers were led by two All-Americans - halfback Al Kreuz and end George Thayer

Coach Sutherland spoke with The Pittsburgh Press: "We will play the kind of football that is best suited to the conditions that may arise as the battle progresses. We are not making any concessions to our foes. We know they are a great team, but other great teams have been beaten this fall, and Penn has been conquered once. All I can say is that my boys will play their hardest and best. They are physically fit to give everything they have, and their work may surprise some of the Quaker partisans."

The Pitt Weekly reported: "Pennsylvania--proud, old Penn—felt the heel of another conqueror last Saturday when the Panthers invaded the Quaker City and sent Lou Young's highly touted eleven down to a 14 to 0 defeat on Franklin Field. Penn was as badly trounced, perhaps more so, than it was when Red Grange and company rambled through its defense at will....The story of the game is – Pitt had the better team. "

Late in the first quarter Pitt gained possession on their 48-yard line. Two short gains were followed by a completed pass from Jesse Brown to Andy Gustafson to the Penn 18-yard line. Six running plays advanced the ball to within inches of the goal line. "Gustafson jumped headlong over center for a touchdown." He then booted the placement through the uprights and Pitt led 7 to 0. Early in the second period Gustafson intercepted a pass in Penn territory and returned it to their 27-yard line. On first down Gilbert Welch gained 17 yards on a triple pass. On the next play, "(John) Harding started off right tackle, but reversed his field beautifully and ran across the line through a maze of tacklers." Gustafson added the point to complete the scoring. Pitt 14 to Penn 0.

Penn coach Lou Young told The Philadelphia Inquirer: "I think Sutherland has a great team. Although at times the Pitt team is not considered when the great teams are thought of, I think the team will stand up to the best of them. They have always been a hard team for Penn to beat and yesterday proved no exception." Penn finished the season with a 7–2 record.

Coach Sutherland praised his Captain: "Captain Chase played one of the greatest tackle games I have ever seen...With Chase doing this sort of work the rest of the line could not help playing their best ball. It was a welcome victory to Pittsburgh and I want to congratulate my men for their showing."

The Pitt lineup for the game against the Quakers was Blair McMillin (left end), Andrew Salata (left tackle), Wendell Steele (left guard), Andy Cutler (center), Zoner Wissinger (right guard), Ralph Chase (right tackle), John Kifewr (right end), John Harding (quarterback), Jesse Brown (left halfback), Gilbert Welch (right halfback) and Andy Gustafson (fullback). Substitutes appearing in the game for Pitt were Howard Linn, Allan Booth, Felix Demoise, Richard Goldberg, James Hagan, Joseph Schmitt, John Roberts, William Kern, Carl McCutcheon, Robert Irwin and Frank Benedict.

=== Penn State ===
Week 9: Penn State at Pitt

Team	1	2	3	4	Total
Penn State	7	0	0	0	7
• Pitt	10	7	6	0	23

- Date: November 26, 1925
- Location: Pitt Stadium
  Pittsburgh, PA
- Game start: 2:00 p.m.
- Game attendance: 50,000
- Game weather: cold
- Referee: C. J. McCarthy, Jr. (Germantown Academy)

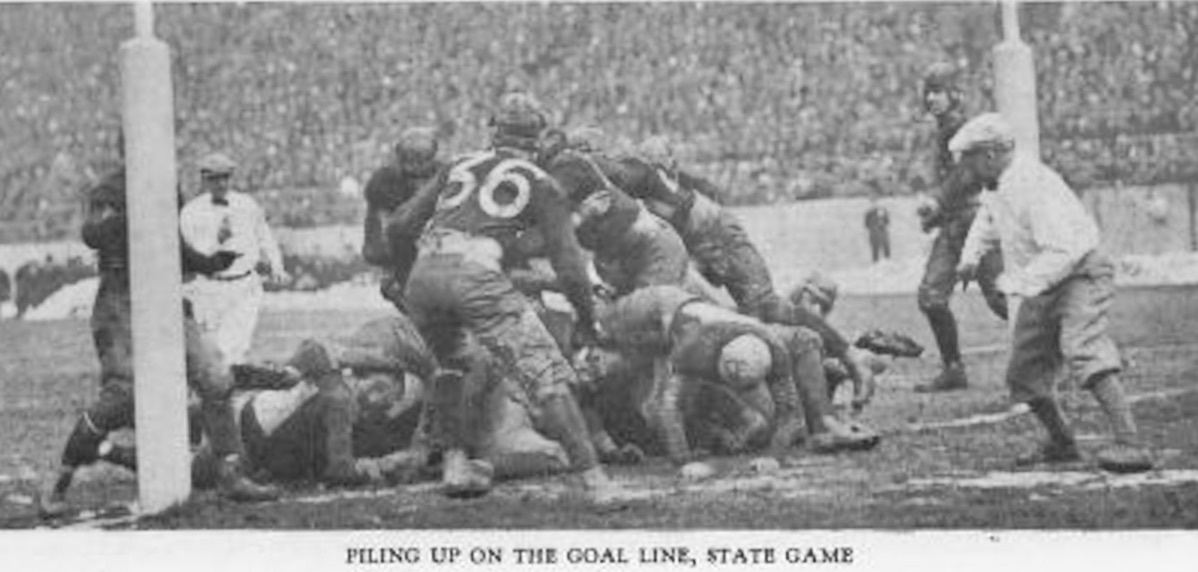
Photo from November 26, 1925 Pitt vs. Penn State game

Thanksgiving Day 1925 marked the 28th meeting of the Panthers and Lions on the gridiron. The series stood at 13–12 in Pitt's favor with 2 ties. Hugo Bezdek and the Nittany Lions were having their worst season since his 1–2–1 debut in 1918. The Lions arrived at Pitt Stadium with a 4–3–1 record, and their only highlight was a scoreless tie with Notre Dame. The Lions had sophomore Cy Lungren at quarterback instead of injured starter Bill Helbig. "The absence of Helbig is a big handicap to the Lions, for the Newark boy has displayed more generalship since he took over the job than has been in evidence for several seasons." "Coach Bezdek has labored hard with his charges this week, and is said to have worked wonders with them. The visitors are a determined lot, and are certain to give the Panthers a tough battle all the way." A Pitt fan warned: "They have everything to gain and nothing to lose in this game, and they will show all they possess in football ability. A triumph over Pitt this year would be about the most impressive thing State could do as a windup to its season."

The Panthers went into the game healthy. "The players have been carefully nursed since the Penn encounter ten days ago, and are fit as the proverbial fiddle. Moreover, they are all anxious to wind up their campaign with a glorious victory, and are not in any mood to show mercy to their opponents." Eleven members of the 1925 team will be playing their final game for the Blue and Gold – Andy Gustafson, Ulhard Hangartner, John Kifer, Wendell Steele, Robert Irwin, Zoner Wissinger, Ralph Chase, Carl McCutcheon, Jesse Brown, Frank Benedict and John Harding.

The Pitt Weekly said it best: "The Panther, with his tail straight up in the air – rather proud since he deserves to be rated just beneath Dartmouth in the national ranking – ended his season Thanksgiving Day in a blaze of glory. It's rather unusual for all good seasons to be ended in blazes of glory and Pitt had a good season. But this particular blaze – 23 to 7 – singed the Nittany Lion and that always makes any blaze a better blaze."

Pitt scored first in the opening quarter when State halfback Johnny Roepke fumbled the snap on his 26-yard line. Andrew Salata scooped up the pigskin and rambled into the end zone for the touchdown. Andy Gustafson added the extra point and Pitt led 7 to 0. Pitt started their next drive on their 27-yard line and advanced the ball to the State 27-yard line. Gustafson missed a 35-yard field goal try but State was offside. Gustafson's attempt from the 30-yard line was perfect and Pitt led 10 to 0. The Penn State offense proceeded to advance the ball to the Pitt 25-yard line. The Pitt defense stiffened and State lined up for a field goal. It was a fake as Cy Lundgren, the holder, dropped back and passed to a wide open Roepke on the five and he waltzed into the end zone for the Nittanies' touchdown. Ken Weston added the point and the first period ended 10 to 7. Early in the second stanza Pitt gained possession on the State 30-yard line. A succession of running plays and State offside penalties led to Gustafson plunging through center from the 2-yard line for the Panthers second touchdown. Gustafson added the point after and the halftime score read: Pitt 17, Penn State 7. In the third period the Panthers gained possession on their 9-yard line. Three running plays moved the ball to the 20-yard line. Then, "a double pass, with (Gibby) Welch carrying the ball, saw the Pitt backfield star cut loose through the opposite side of the line out in the open field for an 80 yard run and a touchdown. Bergman made a frantic effort to overtake him but was a step behind the whole chase." Gustafson shanked the placement and the final score read: Pitt 23 to State 0.

The Pitt lineup for the game against Penn State was Blair McMillin (left end), Andrew Salata (left tackle), Wendell Steele (left guard), Andy Cutler (center), Zoner Wissinger (right guard), Ralph Chase (right tackle), John Kifer (right end), John Harding (quarterback), Jesse Brown (left halfback), Gilbert Welch (right halfback) and Andy Gustafson (fullback). Substitutes appearing in the game for Pitt were Howard Linn, William Kern, Robert Irwin, Felix Demoise, John Roberts, Joseph Schmitt, Carl McCutcheon, Frank Benedict, and Allan Booth.

== Scoring summary ==
1925 Pittsburgh Panthers scoring summary
Player	Touchdowns	Extra points	Field goals	Safety	Points
Andy Gustafson	6	7	5	0	58
Allan A. Booth	2	2	0	0	14
Walter Hoban	1	1	0	0	7
Ralph Chase	1	0	0	0	6
Felix Demoise	1	0	0	0	6
John Grindle	1	0	0	0	6
John Harding	1	0	0	0	6
John Kifer	1	0	0	0	6
Carl McCutcheon	1	0	0	0	6
John Roberts	1	0	0	0	6
Andrew Salata	1	0	0	0	6
Joseph Schmitt	1	0	0	0	6
Wendell Steele	1	0	0	0	6
Gilbert Welch	1	0	0	0	6
Zoner Wissinger	1	0	0	0	6
Totals	21	10	5	0	151

== Postseason ==
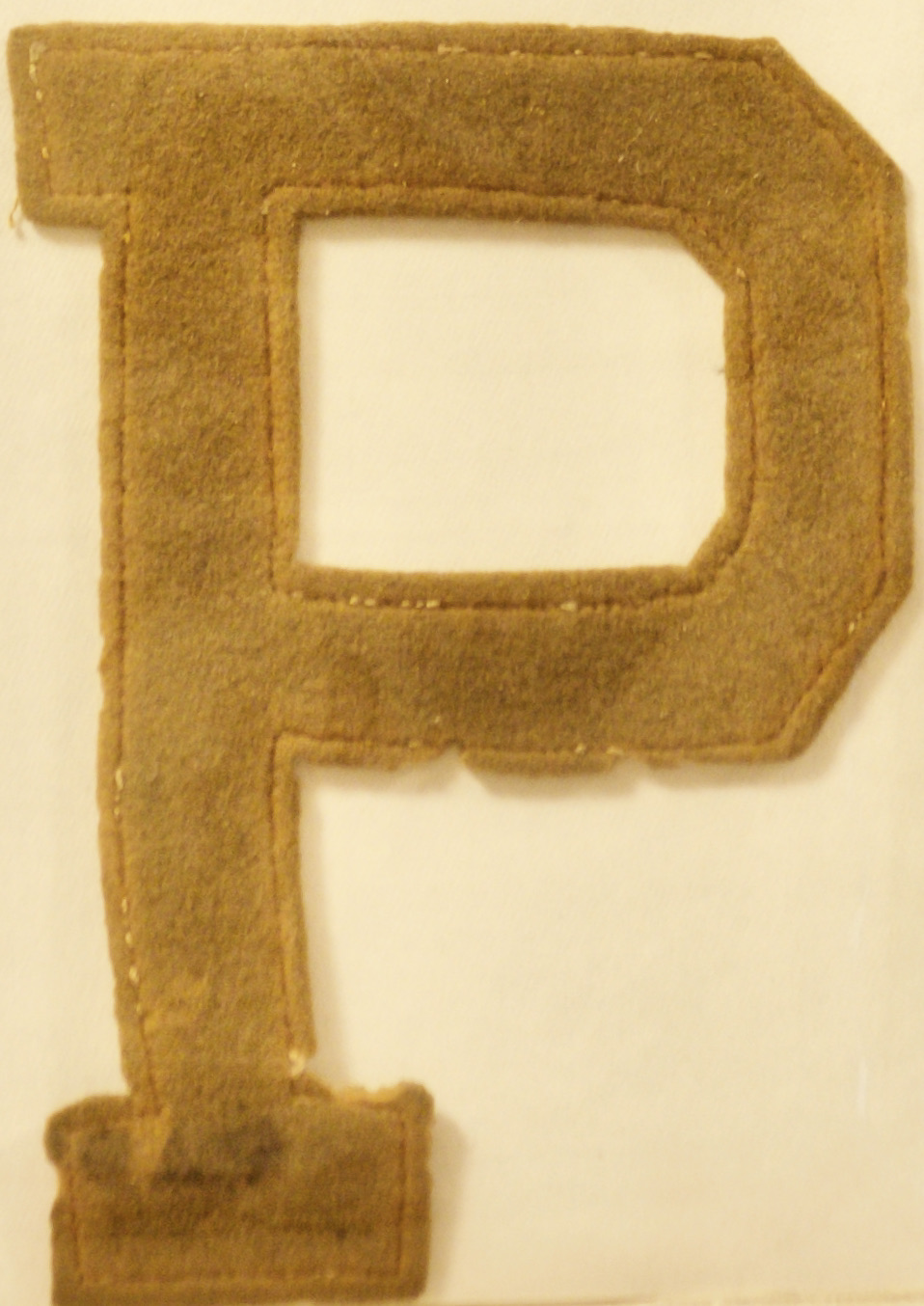
1925 Pitt football lettermen "P" award

David Finoli noted in his book "When Pitt Ruled The Gridiron” how good the 1925 season actually turned out:

“While given no consideration for the national championship at the time, years later when Denmark's Soren Sorensen, a physics professor at the University of Tennessee, decided to develop his college football computer rankings, he calculated that the Panthers were the best team in the nation. It's an honor that, while not recognized by the university as an official championship, showed the power of the 1925 squad."

Ralph Chase was chosen to play in the December 26, 1925 inaugural East-West Shrine Bowl in San Francisco.

The athletic council awarded varsity football letters to the following: Captain Ralph Chase, John Kifer, Blair McMillin, Andrew Salata, Zoner Wissinger, Wendell Steele, Andrew Cutler, Jesse Brown, John Harding, Gilbert Welch, Andrew Gustafson, Frank Benedict, Richard Goldberg, Felix Demoise, John Roberts, William Kern, Howard Linn, Joseph Schmitt, Carl McCutcheon, Robert Irwin, Allan Booth, James Hagan, Ulhard Hangartner and Axel Anderson.

The lettermen selected end Blair McMillin as captain for the 1926 season.

On January 12, John B. McGrady, a junior in the School of Industrial Engineering, was appointed varsity football manager for the 1926 season by Karl E. Davis, graduate manager of athletics.

=== All-American selections ===
Ralph Chase – tackle (1st team Associated Press; 1st team International Board of Football Coaches; 1st team Collier's Weekly (Grantland Rice); 1st team Edward Pollack, Quaker City scribe; 1st team Lou Young, Penn head coach; 1st team Harry Stuhldreher, Villa Nova head coach; 2nd team New York Sun; 1st team Pete Reynolds, Syracuse head coach; 2nd team Davis Walsh, news service sports editor.)

Zoner Wissinger – guard (3rd team International Board of Football Coaches; All-Eastern Team by John “Chick” Meehan, NYU head coach;)

Andrew Gustafson – fullback (Billy Evans Honor Roll. 2nd team Tad Jones, Yale head coach.)

Gilbert Welch -halfback (1st team Edward Pollack, Quaker City scribe.)

Andrew Cutler – center (2nd team Edward Pollack, Quaker City scribe.)

John Harding – quarterback (2nd team Edward Pollack, Quaker City scribe.)

Bold = Consensus All-American
