= Nathan Parker =

Nathan Parker may refer to:

- Nathan Parker (American football), American football player
- Nathan Parker (writer), English screenwriter

== See also ==
- Nate Parker, American actor and filmmaker
- Nathaniel Parker, English stage and screen actor
