= Jacob Slagle =

American football player (1903–1981)

Jake Slagle
- Jacob Slagle in 1924

Profile
- Position: Fullback / halfback / quarterback

Personal information
- Born: August 31, 1903
- Died: January 10, 1981 (age 77)

Career information
- High school: Gilman School (Baltimore, Maryland)
- College: Princeton (1923–1926)

Awards and highlights
- First-team All-American (1925); Second-team All-American (1924); First-team All-Eastern (1925)

Jacob Winebrenner Slagle (August 31, 1903 – January 10, 1981), sometimes known as Jake Slagle, was an American football player.

== Early life ==
Slagle grew up in Baltimore, Maryland. He attended Gilman School in Baltimore where he was a top athlete, competing in football, baseball, soccer, track and field, and tennis. Slagle was a four-year participant in football and baseball and played three years for the soccer team, earning recognition from The Evening Sun as "one of the greatest high school athletes ever turned out in the city". As a football player, he was considered one of the area's best rushers and served as team captain as a senior in 1922. He was also considered the school's best tennis player. Slagle served as class president and president of the student governing board at Gilman. At the end of his high school career, he was given a gold watch by Gilman for his accomplishments. Slagle graduated in 1923.

== College career ==
Slagle enrolled at Princeton University in 1923 and went on to play for the Princeton Tigers football team from 1924 to 1926, in addition to being a member of the baseball and soccer teams. Before playing for the varsity football team, he was a member of the freshman squad in 1923. According to The Evening Sun, 20 players had initially "signified their intention of coming out for quarterback" for the 1923 team before Slagle announced his intention to do so. Then, according to The Sun, "the 20 men shook their heads and immediately switched to some other position ... Evidently they thought there was little use when Slagle was trying for the place. Jake now has the entire field to himself." He captained the freshman team.

Slagle grew up in Baltimore, Maryland, and attended the Gilman School before enrolling at Princeton University. He played college football at the fullback, halfback and quarterback positions for the Princeton Tigers football team from 1924 to 1926 and was known as a triple-threat man who handled passing, kicking and rushing responsibilities for the team, and excelled on defense as well.

Slagle was selected by the United Press as a first-team fullback on the 1925 College Football All-America Team. He also received second-team All-American honors in 1924 from Walter Camp (at quarterback) and in 1925 from the Associated Press (at fullback), All-America Board (at quarterback), Collier's Weekly (at halfback), and others.

After missing most of the 1926 season due to illness, Slagle left the hospital in November 1926 to lead the Tigers to their third consecutive victory over Harvard. After that game, Princeton coach Bill Roper praised Slagle's efforts:

"Slagle played the most remarkable game today, in many ways, ever seen on a football field. When you consider that previously he had played only forty minutes of football during the present season and came out of the hospital only a week ago, I think the brilliance of his performance was unbeatable."

Slagle also played soccer and baseball at Princeton and was awarded the Poe Cup in June 1927 as "the star triple threat of the Tiger eleven for the past three years."

== Later life ==
In 1927, after receiving his degree in geology with honors, Slagle was hired as an assistant to Princeton's dean and also served as an assistant football coach. In June 1928, he returned to Baltimore and was hired as the backfield coach for the football team at his alma mater, the Gilman School.
