= Herbert Sturhahn =

American football player (1902–1979)

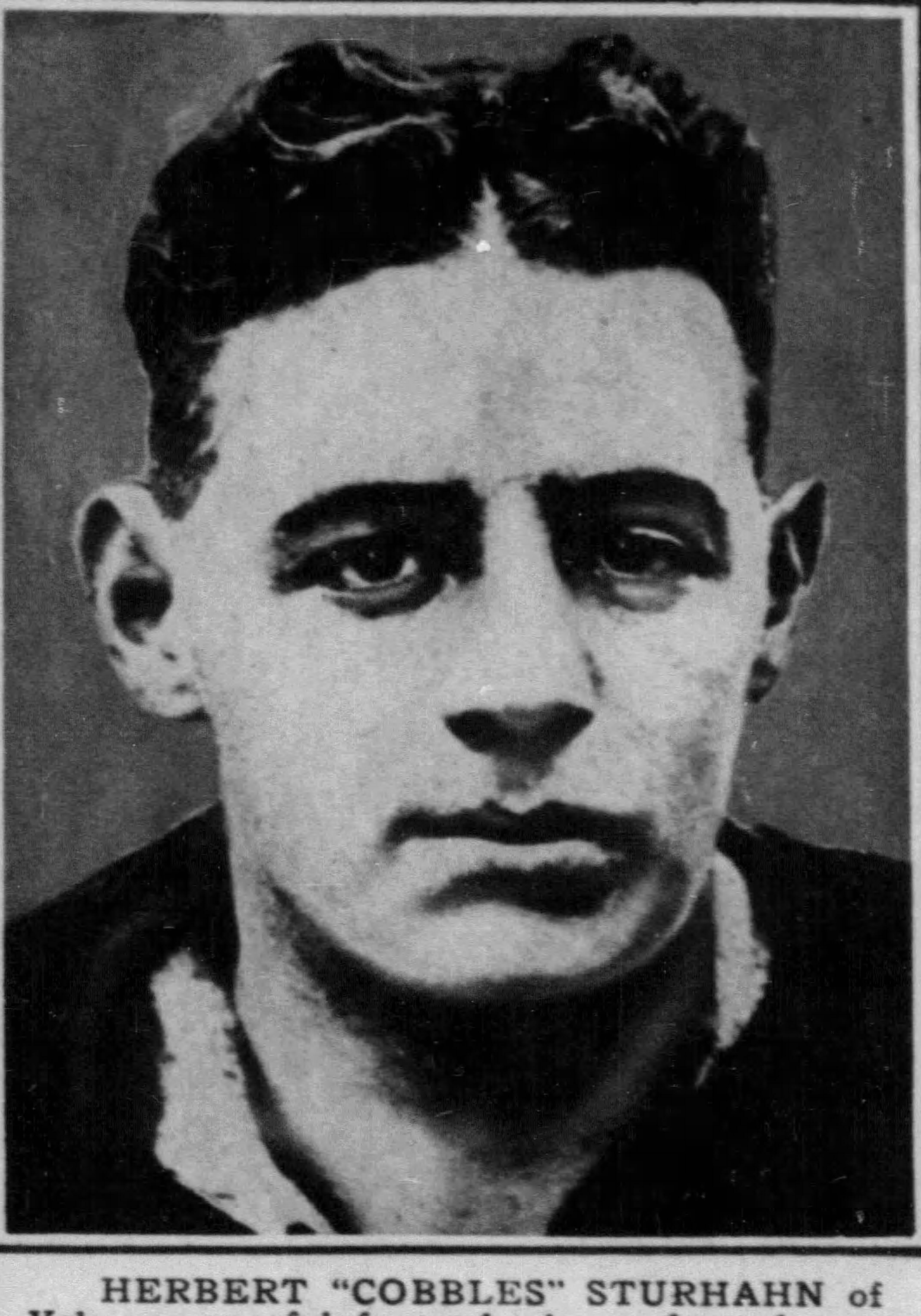
- Sturhahn in 1935

Profile
- Position: Guard

Personal information
- Born: July 29, 1902; Far Rockaway, Queens, New York, U.S.
- Died: January 10, 1979 (aged 76); Princeton, New Jersey, U.S.
- Listed height: 6 ft 1 in (1.85 m)
- Listed weight: 202 lb (92 kg)

Career information
- High school: Taft (New York City); New York Military Academy
- College: Yale (1924–1926)

Awards and highlights
- 2× First-team All-American (1925, 1926); First-team All-Eastern (1925)
- College Football Hall of Fame (Class of 1981)

Herbert Carl Sturhahn (July 29, 1902 – January 10, 1979), nicknamed "Cobbles", was an American gridiron football player. He was a first-team All-American guard at Yale University in 1925 and 1926, and was posthumously inducted to the College Football Hall of Fame.

== Early life ==
Sturhahn was born in 1902 at Far Rockaway, Queens, New York City. He was the son of Carl F. Sturhahn (1871–1939), an immigrant from Germany and president of the Rossia Insurance Company. The younger Sturhahn grew up on Long Island and attended William Howard Taft High School and the New York Military Academy.

== Yale ==
Sturhahn enrolled at Yale University, where he played college football at the guard position for the Yale Bulldogs football teams. As a sophomore, he helped lead the 1924 Yale football team to an undefeated 6–0–2 season. As a junior and again as a senior, he was selected by the All-America Board as a first-team guard on their 1925 and 1926 All-America teams. The Associated Press named him a first-team selection to their 1925 All-America team, as well as their 1925 All-Eastern team.

During the 1926 Harvard–Yale football rivalry game, his final game for the Bulldogs, Sturhahn recovered a blocked punt for a Yale touchdown, the winning margin in a 12–7 victory. One sportswriter credited Sturhahn with being "half of Eli's team" and described his contributions:

But lest we . . . overlook the hero of the game on the field, let us pause a moment to salute one "Cobbles" Sturhahn. . . . A guard, no matter how loyally and brilliantly he may labor, is compelled by the nature of his job to wage his mimic warfare under a pile of rival jerseys, hidden from the crowd. And the courageous work he did was lost upon the thoughtless. But Saturday "Cobbles" was at least three Sturhahns of the yesteryears.
He made Yale's touchdown. It would have been a safety but for his quick eye and impetuous dive to grasp his golden opportunity. And having put his team in the lead, it was he who held it there. . . . He was everywhere, playing a roving guard. He ducked the pile of rival jerseys and shone in the brightest rays of light that pierced the black clouds overhead and filled the Bowl with a blue ray of burning will to win. Yale owes that game to Sturhahn and the more one examines and analyses the play-by-play account, the taller looms Sturhahn's part in the famous victory.

Sturhahn was an all-around athlete who also competed for Yale in ice hockey, track, and golf.

== Post-Yale ==
In June 1927, Sturhahn married Etienne Lawrence, a foster daughter of journalist David Lawrence. A son, Lawrence (1928–1997), had a career working on motion pictures, serving as producer of the 1971 George Lucas movie THX 1138.

Sturhahn became an insurance broker in New Jersey. In the late 1930s, he served as president of the Indoor Polo Association of America. Sturhahn died in 1979 and was posthumously inducted into the College Football Hall of Fame in 1981.
