= 1925 All-America college football team =

Official list of the best college football players of 1925

The 1925 All-America college football team is composed of college football players who were selected as All-Americans by various organizations and writers that chose All-America college football teams in 1925.

Walter Camp died in March 1925, marking the end of his "official" All-American selections for Collier's Weekly. The wire services and others moved in to fill the void in 1925, with both the United Press and Associated Press offering their own All-American teams for the first time. The eight selectors recognized by the NCAA as "official" for the 1925 season are (1) the All-America Board (AAB), (2) the Associated Press (AP), (3) Collier's Weekly, with Grantland Rice replacing Camp as the selector, (4) Football World magazine, (5) the International News Service (INS), (6) Liberty magazine, (7) the Newspaper Enterprise Association (NEA), and (8) the United Press (UP).

The only two unanimous All-Americans in 1925 were tackle Ed Weir of Nebraska and halfback Andy Oberlander of Dartmouth. Red Grange of Illinois and Bennie Oosterbaan of Michigan each received first-team designations from seven of the eight official selectors.

== Consensus All-Americans ==
1925, the NC recognizes eight All-American teams as "official" designations for purposes of its consensus determinations. The following chart identifies the NCAA-recognized consensus All-Americans and displays which first-team designations they received.

Name	Position	School	Number	Official	Other
Ed Weir	Tackle	Nebraska	8/8	AAB, AP, COL, FW, INS, LIB, NEA, UP	A&S, BE, HR, NB, RKN, Sun, WC, WE
Andy Oberlander	Halfback	Dartmouth	8/8	AAB, AP, COL, FW, INS, LIB, NEA, UP	A&S, BE, HR, NB, RKN, Sun, SW, WC, WE
Bennie Oosterbaan	End	Michigan	7/8	AAB, AP, COL, FW, INS, NEA, UP	A&S, BE, NB, RKN, Sun, WC, WE
Red Grange	Halfback	Illinois	7/8	AP, COL, FW, INS, LIB, NEA, UP	A&S, BE, HR, NB, RKN, Sun, SW, WC, WE
Carl Diehl	Guard	Dartmouth	6/8	AAB, AP, COL, FW, INS, UP	BE, NB, Sun, SW, WC, WE
Ernie Nevers	Fullback	Stanford	6/8	AAB, AP, COL, INS, LIB, NEA	A&S, BE, NB, WC, WE
George Tully	End	Dartmouth	5/8	AP, INS, LIB, NEA, UP	A&S, BE, NB, Sun, SW, WE
Ed McMillan	Center	Princeton	5/8	AAB, AP, COL, NEA, UP	HR, NB, Sun, WC, WE
Wildcat Wilson	Halfback; Quarterback	Washington	5/8	AAB, AP, FW, COL, INS	HR, RKN, WC, WE
Ralph Chase	Tackle	Pittsburgh	4/8	AAB, AP, COL, FW	--
Ed Hess	Guard	Ohio State	4/8	COL, LIB, NEA, UP	A&S, BE, HR, NB
Benny Friedman	Quarterback	Michigan	3/8	AAB, LIB, UP	RKN, Sun, SW

== Death of Walter Camp and calls to end the All-Americans ==
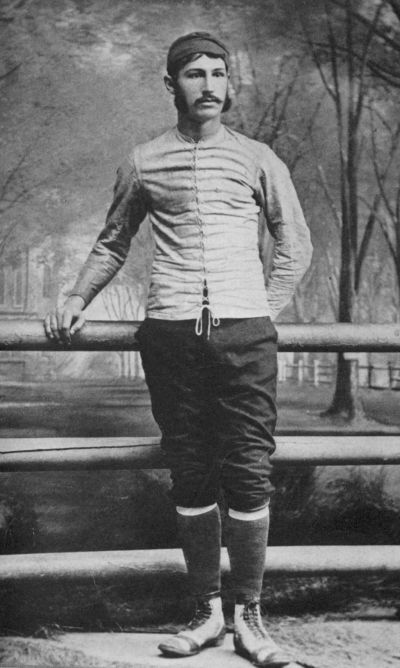
Walter Camp died in March 1925

For more than 25 years before 1925, the selections made by Walter Camp for Collier's Weekly were considered the "official" All-American selections. With the death of Camp in March 1925, the field was open as to which selector's choices would be recognized as the "official" All-Americans.

Some advocated putting an end to the tradition of selecting All-American teams. Edward K. Hall, chairman of the inter-collegiate rules committee, advocated that position at the New York banquet honoring the New York Sun's 1925 All-Americans. Hall said, "I say with all the earnestness that is in me that I hope this is the last dinner to an all-American team that will ever be held in America." Hall argued that such selections place an over-emphasis on the importance of individual players in a team sport. Hall also denounced as a menace the manner in which professional football promoters were luring college players to play professional football for "easy money and quick money."

== Proliferation of All-American teams ==
Despite the calls of some for the end to All-American teams, the death of Walter Camp did not bring an end to the tradition. Instead, Camp's death led to a proliferation of yet more experts naming their own All-American teams.

Even Ring Lardner jumped into the All-American mix in 1925 offering a satirical All-American team consisting of Red Grange at quarterback with Lardner, his friends and family members (men and women, elderly and children) filling out the remaining spots. Lardner wrote: "As soon as you have Grange and a center to pass him the ball you don't need or want no more football players and can take advantage of the opportunity to fill out other positions with relatives and congenial friends." Frank Getty of the United News Service wrote: “Now that All-American teams, All-Eastern teams, All-Conference teams and All-Colored teams for 1925 have been picked by everyone including the janitor, the janitor’s boy and Natalia Crane it’s about time to admit that it’s a futile practice. At best. No one is qualified to select an All-American team on his own, because no one can watch more than one game each Saturday during the season, nor see more than eight or nine games at the most.”

== Rise of the wire service teams ==
One of the major developments in 1925 was the rise of All-American teams selected by wire services based on polls of sports writers and coaches across the country.

In late November 1925, University of Michigan coach Fielding H. Yost publicly advocated a new system. Yost opined that the selection was not a job to be undertaken by any individual or any group of football experts. Yost said: "As Walter Camp has stated to me more than once, during the last five years of his life, this job of selecting an All-American was growing more and more difficult because of the great number of good football men in America."

Both the United Press and Associated Press named All-American teams in 1925. United Press sports editor Henry L. Farrell described the service's purpose in entering the All-American business: "The average season consists of from eight to ten Saturdays and it is a physical impossibility for any one to see more than one game and it is likewise impossible for any human with ordinary vision equipment to see in action all the good teams in the country." For that reason, Farrell announced that he had submitted questionnaires to 75 leading coaches and officials and picked a team based on those results.

== All-American selections for 1925 ==
=== Ends ===
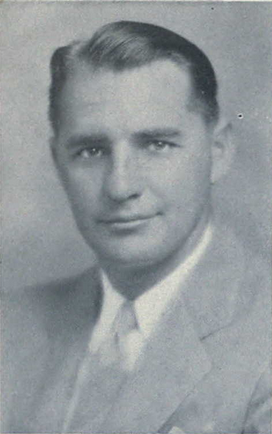
Bennie Oosterbaan later coached Michigan to a national championship in 1948.

- Bennie Oosterbaan, Michigan (AAB-1; AP-1; COL-1; FW; INS; NEA; UP; A&S-1; BE-1; NB-1; RKN; Sun-1; WC; WE–1, BEHR)
- George Tully, Dartmouth (AP-1; COL-3; INS; LIB; NEA; UP; A&S-1; BE-1; NB-1; Sun–1; SW; WE-2, BEHR)
- George Thayer, Pennsylvania (AP-2; COL-1; WE-3; RKN; Sun-2, BEHR)
- Charles F. Born, Army (AAB-1; AP-2; BE-2; Sun–2; WC)
- Dick Romey, Iowa (COL-2; LIB)
- Ted Sloane, Drake (AAB-2; FW; WE-3, BEHR)
- LaVern Dilweg, Marquette (WE–1)
- Cookie Cunningham, Ohio State (HR)
- Henry Baxter, Army (HR)
- Chuck Kassel, Illinois (AAB-3; COL-2; BE-2; WE-2, BEHR)
- Ted Shipkey, Stanford (AAB-2; NB-2; SW, BEHR)
- Vic Hanson, Syracuse (AP-3)
- J. G. Lowe, Tennessee (AP-3, BEHR)
- Carl Bacchus, Missouri (COL-3)
- Edwards, Washington & Jefferson (NB-2)
- Ray Wagner, Columbia (AAB-3)
- Gus Merkle, Georgia Tech (BEHR)
- Hobbs Adams, USC (BEHR)

=== Tackles ===
- Ed Weir, Nebraska (AAB-1; AP-1; COL-1; FW; INS; LIB; NEA; UP; A&S-1; BE-1; HR; NB-1; RKN; Sun–1; WC; WE–1, BEHR)
- Ralph E. Chase, Pittsburgh (AAB-1; AP-1; COL-1; FW; BE-2; Sun-2; WE-2, BEHR)
- Nathan Parker, Dartmouth (AAB-3; AP-2; COL-2; UP; Sun-2; WE-2, BEHR)
- Harry Hawkins, Michigan (FW [guard]; AAB-3; WE-3, BEHR)
- Johnny Joss, Yale (LIB; BE-2; NB-2; Sun–1, BEHR)
- Ed Lindenmeyer, Missouri (AAB-2; AP-2; COL-3; INS; NEA; A&S-1; BE-2; RKN; SW; WE-3, BEHR)
- Tom Edwards, Michigan (AP-3; COL-2; NB-2; WE–1)
- Bub Henderson, Chicago (NB-1)
- Rip Bachor, Detroit (HR)
- Hector Cyre, Gonzaga (AP-3)
- Walden Erickson, Washington (COL-3, BEHR)
- Bud Sprague, Army (AAB-2; SW)
- Goldy Goldstein, Florida (BEHR)
- Bob Rives, Vanderbilt (BEHR)
- John Sargent, California (BEHR)
- Stonewall McMannon, Notre Dame (BEHR)

=== Guards ===
- Carl Diehl, Dartmouth (AAB-1; AP-1; COL-1; FW; INS; UP; BE-2; NB-1; Sun–1; SW; WC; WE-1, BEHR)
- Ed Hess, Ohio State (AAB-2; AP-2; COL-1; LIB; NEA; UP; A&S-1; BE-1; NB-1; HR; WE-2, BEHR)
- Herbert Sturhahn, Yale (AAB-1; AP-1; COL-3; RKN [center]; Sun–1; WC; WE-1, BEHR)
- Brice Taylor, USC (FW; SW; BEHR)
- Dana Carey, California (AAB-2; AP-3; COL-2; LIB; NB-2)
- Emerson Carey, Cornell (A&S-1)
- Ed McMillan, Princeton (BE-1)
- Walter Mahan, West Virginia (AP-3; AAB-3; WE-3; BE-2, BEHR)
- Bill Buckler, Alabama (AP-2; WE-3, BEHR)
- Kilgore, Harvard (Sun–2; NB-2)
- Len Walsh, Minnesota (WE–2)
- August William Lentz, Jr., Navy (Sun–2)
- Walt Godwin, Georgia Tech. (COL-2; RKN, BEHR)
- Ray J. Stipek, Wisconsin (COL-3)
- Zeke Wissinger, Pittsburgh (AAB-3)
- Merwin Mitterwallner, Illinois (HR)
- Ernest Schmidt, Army (RKN)
- Bernie Shively, Illinois (BEHR)
- Fred H. Swan, Stanford (BEHR)
- Egbert Brix, Washington (BEHR)
- Clipper Smith, Notre Dame (BEHR)

=== Centers ===
- Ed McMillan, Princeton (AAB-1; AP-1; COL-1; NEA; UP; HR; NB-2; Sun–1; WC; WE-1; WC, BEHR)
- Robert Brown, Michigan (AP-2; COL-2; INS; LIB; NEA; A&S-1; BE-1; NB-1; Sun-2; SW, BEHR)
- Tim Lowry, Northwestern (AAB-2; COL-3; FW; BE-2; WE-3, BEHR)
- Harold Hutchinson (Hutchison), Nebraska (AP-3; WE–2)
- Jeff Cravath, USC(AAB-3, BEHR)
- Amos Kent, Sewanee (BEHR)

=== Quarterbacks ===
- Benny Friedman, Michigan (AAB-1; AP-2; COL-2; LIB; UP; BE-2; RKN; Sun–1; SW; WE–2, BEHR)
- George Pease, Columbia (Sun–2)
- Kenny Hyde, Colorado Aggies (AP-3)
- Lester Lautenschlaeger (College Football Hall of Fame), Tulane (COL-3)
- Morley Drury, U.S.C. (AAB-3, BEHR [as hb])
- George Guttormsen, Washington (BEHR)
- Bill Kelly, Montana (BEHR)
- Edgar C. Jones, Florida (BEHR)
- Earl Graham, Fordham (BEHR)

=== Halfbacks ===
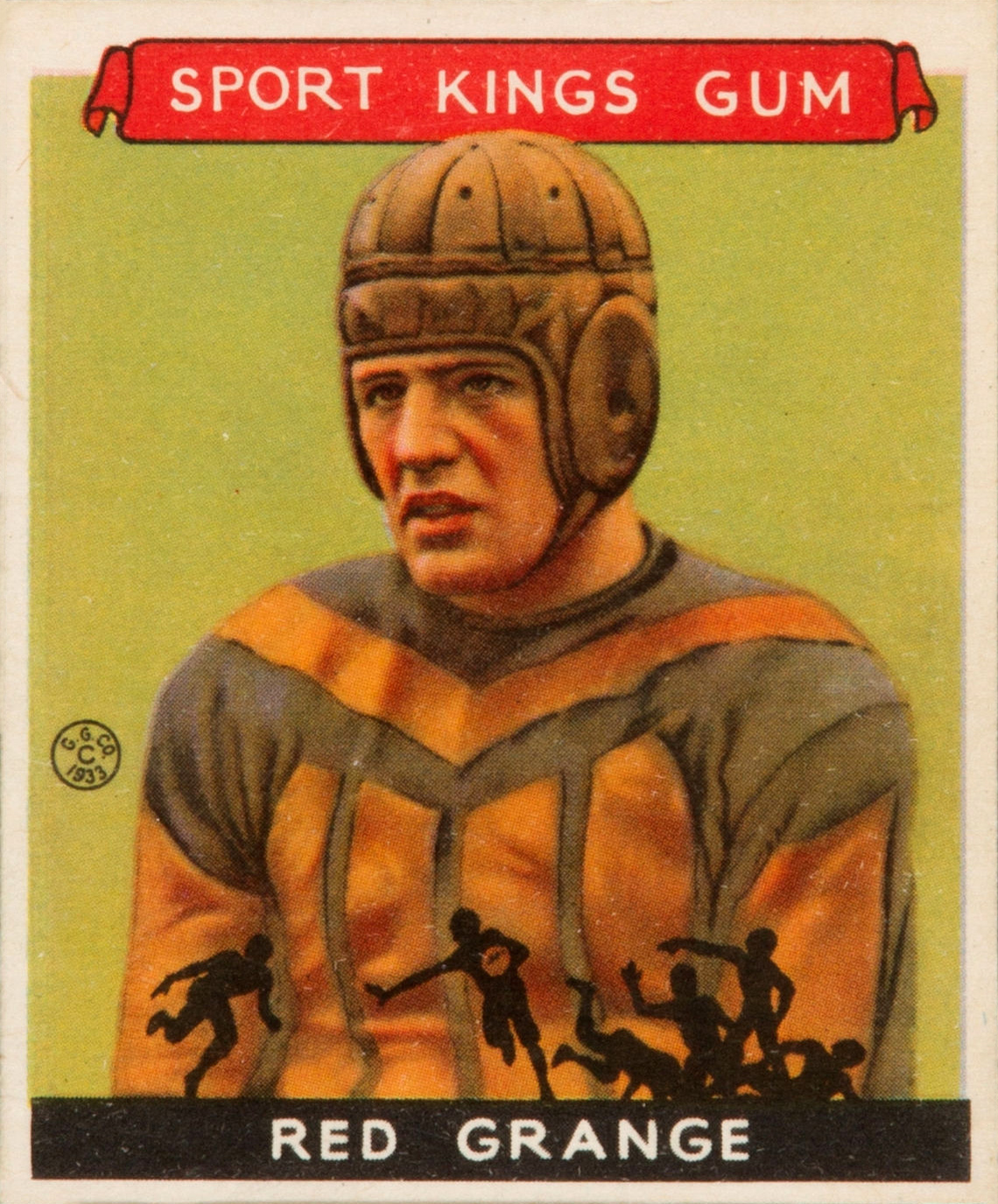
Red Grange, "The Galloping Ghost", was named to seven of eight official All-America teams in 1924.

- Andy Oberlander, Dartmouth (AAB-1; AP-1; COL-1; FW; INS; LIB; NEA; UP; A&S-1; BE-1; HR; NB-1; RKN; Sun–1; SW; WC; WE-1, BEHR)
- Red Grange, Illinois (AAB-2 [hb]; AP-1 [qb]; COL-1 [qb]; FW; INS; LIB; NEA; UP [hb]; A&S-1; BE-1 [qb]; HR [qb]; NB-1 [qb]; RKN [qb]; Sun-1 [fb]; SW [qb]; WC [qb]; WE–1 [hb], BEHR)
- Wildcat Wilson, Washington (AAB-1; AP-1; COL-1; FW [hb], INS; BE-2; HR [qb]; RKN [qb]; WC; WE-1 [hb], BEHR)
- Eddie Tryon, Colgate (AAB-3; AP-2; COL-2; FW; A&S-1; BE-2; NB-2; Sun-1; SW; WE-2, BEHR)
- Peggy Flournoy, Tulane (AAB-2; AP-2; COL-3; NEA; BE-1; HR [qb]; NB-1; WE–3 [qb], BEHR)
- Jackson Keefer, Brown (AP-3; COL-3; WE-3)
- Ralph Baker, Northwestern (NB-2)
- Al Kreuz, Penn (Sun–2, BEHR)
- Johnny Mack Brown, Alabama (AP-3, BEHR)
- Doyle Harmon, Wisconsin (WE–3)
- Christie Flanagan, Notre Dame (BEHR)
- Austin "Five Yards" McCarty, Chicago (BEHR)

=== Fullbacks ===
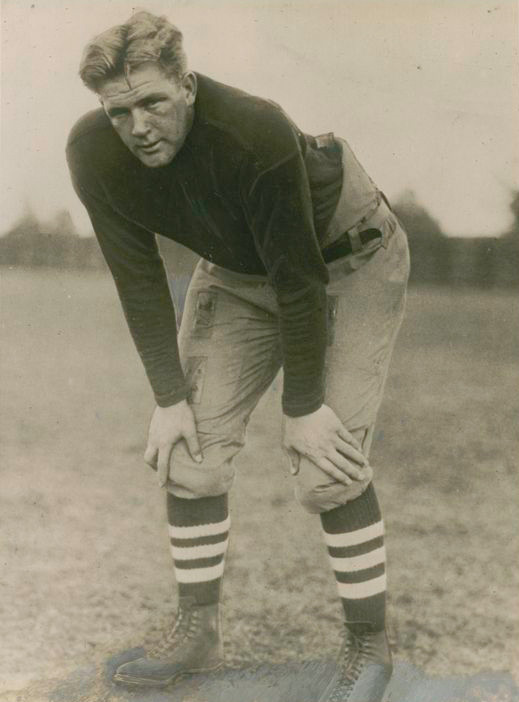
Ernie Nevers of Stanford

- Ernie Nevers, Stanford (AAB-1; AP-1; COL-1; INS; LIB; NEA; A&S-1; BE-1; NB-1; WC; WE-1, BEHR)
- Jacob Slagle, Princeton (AAB-2 [qb]; AP-2; COL-2 [hb]; UP; BE-2; Sun–2 [hb]; WE-2 [hb], BEHR)
- Allison "Pooley" Hubert (College Football Hall of Fame), Alabama (COL-2, AAB-2 [hb]; WE-2, NB-2 [qb], BEHR [qb])
- Tony Plansky, Georgetown (AAB-3 [as hb]; COL-3; Sun–2, BEHR)
- Elmer Tesreau, Washington (AP-3; AAB-3, BEHR)
- Bo Molenda, Michigan (NB-2)
- Rex Enright, Notre Dame (WE–3)
- Herb Joesting, Minnesota (BEHR)
- Loren L. Lewis, Northwestern (BEHR)
- Doug Wycoff, Georgia Tech (BEHR)
- Windy White, VMI (BEHR)
- Andy Gustafson, Pitt (BEHR)

== Key ==
Bold = Consensus All-Americans

- -1 – First-team selection
- -2 – Second-team selection
- -3 – Third-team selection

=== Selectors recognized by NCAA ===
- UP = United Press based on interviews and questionnaires submitted to 75 coaches and officials
- AP = Associated Press teams "from country-wide opinions"
- COL = Collier's Weekly as selected by Grantland Rice
- AAB = The All-America Board; the Christy Walsh Syndicate asked an Inter-Sectional Board of Football Coaches made up of Tad Jones of Yale, Knute Rockne of Notre Dame and Glenn "Pop" Warner of Stanford to deliberate and select an All-American team
- FW = Football Writers Association of America
- INS = International News Service
- LIB = Liberty magazine
- NEA = Newspaper Enterprise Association

=== Other selectors ===
- A&S = Athlete and Sportsman magazine, selections made based on the votes of 228 leading football coaches, as canvassed by Jim Thorpe, Charles Paddock, and James Fetzer.
- Sun = The Sun (New York)
- WC = Walter Camp Football Foundation
- WE = selected by Walter Eckersall, football critic of the Chicago Tribune
- BE = Billy Evans
- NB = Norman E. Brown
- HR = Herbert Reed
- RKN = Knute Rockne
- SW = Sam Willaman
- BEHR = Billy Evans's "National Honor Roll"

== See also ==
- 1925 All-Big Ten Conference football team
- 1925 All-Missouri Valley Conference football team
- 1925 All-Pacific Coast football team
- 1925 All-Southern college football team
- 1925 All-Southwest Conference football team
- 1925 All-Eastern football team
- 1925 All-Western college football team
