= 1925 All-Eastern football team =

American all-star college football team

The 1925 All-Eastern football team consists of American football players chosen by various selectors as the best players at each position among the Eastern colleges and universities during the 1925 college football season.

The undefeated 1925 Dartmouth Indians football team had four players who received first-team All-Eastern honors from at least one selector: halfback Andy Oberlander; end George Tully; tackle Nathan Parker; and guard Carl Diehl.

Five players received first-team All-Eastern honors and were also consensus first-team All-Americans: Oberander, Tully, and Diehl of Dartmouth; center Ed McMillan of Princeton; and tackle Ralph Chase of Pittsburgh.

Six of the All-Eastern honorees were later inducted into the College Football Hall of Fame: Oberlander; halfback Eddie Tryon of Colgate; fullback Andy Gustafson of Pittsburgh; end Vic Hanson of Syracuse; tackle Bud Sprague of Army; and guard Herbert Sturhahn of Yale.

== All-Eastern selections ==
=== Quarterbacks ===
- Jim Foley, Syracuse (AP-1, CM)
- Earl "Zev" Graham, Fordham (NEB, HM)
- George Pease, Columbia (AP-2)
- Marion "Dolph" Cheek, Harvard (GD)

=== Halfbacks ===
- Andy Oberlander, Dartmouth (AP-1, CDD, NEB, GD [fb], HM, TJ, CM)
- Eddie Tryon, Colgate (AP-1, NEB, GD, HM, TJ, CM)
- Jackson Keefer, Brown (AP-2, CDD, GD)
- Tom Dignan, Princeton (CDD)
- Frank Kirkleski, Lafayette (AP-2)

=== Fullbacks ===
- Jacob Slagle, Princeton (AP-1, CDD [qb], TJ [qb])
- Bill Amos, Washington & Jefferson (AP-2, HM)
- Tony Plansky, Georgetown (TJ)
- Al Kreuz, Penn (AP-2, CM)
- Andy Gustafson, Pittsburgh (NEB)

=== Ends ===
- George Tully, Dartmouth (AP-1, NEB, HM, CM)
- Vic Hanson, Syracuse (AP-1, CM)
- Charles F. Born, Army (CDD, TJ)
- Korn, Swarthmore (GD)
- George Thayer, Penn (AP-2, GD)
- Ford, Lafayette (HM)
- Ray Wagner, Columbia (TJ)
- Edwards, Washington & Jefferson (NEB)
- Madison Sayles, Harvard (CDD)
- Henry Sage, Dartmouth (AP-2)

=== Tackles ===
- Nathan Parker, Dartmouth (AP-1, HM, TJ)
- Ralph Chase, Pittsburgh (AP-1, HM)
- Johnny Joss, Yale (AP-2, CDD, NEB, GD, CM)
- Kaleb Wiberg, Columbia (AP-2, GD)
- Caleb Frank Gates, Princeton (TJ)
- Bud Sprague, Army (AP-2, CM)
- Joseph Putnam Willson, Penn (NEB)
- Clement D. Coady, Harvard (CDD)

=== Guards ===
- Carl Diehl, Dartmouth (AP-1, CDD, GD, TJ, NEB)
- Herbert Sturhahn, Yale (AP-1, CDD, TJ)
- Emerson Carey, Cornell (AP-2, GD)
- Walter Mahan, West Virginia (AP-2, HM)
- Cothran, Lafayette (AP-2, HM)
- Zeke Wissinger, Pittsburgh (CM)
- Skubin, NYU (AP-2, CM)
- Bayard L. Kilgour Jr., Harvard (NEB)

=== Centers ===
- Ed McMillan, Princeton (AP-1, CDD, HM, TJ, CM, NEB)
- Karl Robinson, Penn (AP-2, GD)

== Key ==
- AP = Associated Press, compiled based on opinions of 10 prominent coaches
- NEB = Norman E. Brown, sports writer and editor
- CDD = Charles Dudley Daly
- GB = Gil Dobie, head coach of Cornell
- HM = Herb McCracken, head coach of Lafayette
- TJ = Tad Jones, head coach of Yale
- CM = Chick Meehan, head coach of NYU

== See also ==
- 1925 College Football All-America Team
- 1925 All-Western college football team
