= Ralph Chase =

American football player and coach (1902–1989)

Profile
- Position: Tackle

Personal information
- Born: December 19, 1902
- Died: October 24, 1989 (aged 86); Gillett, Pennsylvania, U.S.
- Listed height: 6 ft 3 in (1.91 m)
- Listed weight: 219 lb (99 kg)

Career information
- High school: Wyoming Seminary (Kingston, Pennsylvania)
- College: Pittsburgh

Career history
- Hammond Pros (1926); Akron Indians (1926)

Awards and highlights
- Consensus All-American (1925); First-team All-Eastern (1925)
- Stats at Pro Football Reference

Ralph E. "Horse" Chase (December 19, 1902 – October 24, 1989) was an American football tackle who played one season in the National Football League (NFL) with the Hammond Pros and Akron Indians. Chase played college football at the University of Pittsburgh and attended Wyoming Seminary in Kingston, Pennsylvania. He was a consensus All-American in 1925.

== College career ==
Chase was a three-year letterman for the Pittsburgh Panthers football team. He was recognized as a consensus first-team All-American at the tackle position following the 1925 season.

== Professional career ==
Chase appeared in four games for the Akron Indians and one game for the Hammond Pros during the 1926 NFL season.

== Coaching career ==
Chase was a coach for several organizations, including Ursinus College, Bernardsville High School, Drexel and Muhlenberg College.
