= George Pease (American football) =

American football player (1903–1984)

Profile
- Positions: Quarterback, halfback

Personal information
- Born: June 18, 1903; Brooklyn, New York, U.S.
- Died: October 26, 1984 (aged 81); Dallas, Texas, U.S.
- Listed height: 5 ft 8 in (1.73 m)
- Listed weight: 185 lb (84 kg)

Career information
- College: Columbia

Career history
- New York Yankees (1926); Orange Tornadoes (1929)

Awards and highlights
- Collyers 2nd Team All-NFL; Green Bay Press-Gazette: 2nd Team All-NFL; Second-team All-Eastern (1925)
- Stats at Pro Football Reference

George Gregory Pease (June 18, 1903 – October 26, 1984) was an American professional football player with the New York Yankees of the first American Football League (AFL) and the Orange Tornadoes of the National Football League (NFL). George played college football at Columbia University prior to playing professionally.
