= Andy Oberlander =

American football player and coach (1905–1968)

Biographical details
- Born: February 17, 1905; Chelsea, Massachusetts, U.S.
- Died: January 1, 1968 (aged 62); New Vernon, New Jersey, U.S.

Playing career
- 1925: Dartmouth
- Position: Halfback

Coaching career (HC unless noted)
- 1926–1929: Ohio State (assistant)
- 1930–1933: Wesleyan

Accomplishments and honors

Awards
- As a player: Unanimous All-American (1925); First-team All-Eastern (1925)
- College Football Hall of Fame; Inducted in 1954 (profile)

Andrew James "Swede" Oberlander (February 17, 1905 – January 1, 1968) was an American college football player and coach. He was an All-American halfback for Dartmouth College's Indians undefeated and national championship football team in 1925. Oberlander was inducted into the College Football Hall of Fame as a player in 1954.

== Dartmouth College ==
Oberlander was converted to halfback from the tackle position, and had a "terrific straight arm". In 1925, Oberlander passed for 14 touchdowns and ran for 12. Dartmouth defeated Harvard 32–9, its best victory to date over the Crimson. In a 62–13 victory over Cornell, Oberlander had 477 yards in total offense, including six touchdown passes, a Dartmouth record which still stands. He was responsible for some 500 yards of total offense. Cornell coach Gil Dobie responded "We won the game 13–0, passing is not football." The season closed with a 33–7 victory over defending Big Ten champion Chicago. Oberlander threw three touchdowns.

== Coaching career ==
Oberlander was an assistant coach at Ohio State University from 1926 to 1929 and head coach at Wesleyan University from 1930 to 1933. While at Wesleyan, he commuted to New Haven and received his MD from Yale School of Medicine.

== World War II ==
In World War II, as a Lt. Commander in the United States Navy Reserve, he was chief medical officer aboard the USS Samaritan (AH-10), in the Pacific Fleet. When the war ended, many U.S. troops remained in the Far East awaiting transportation back to the States. Oberlander was head coach of the Navy All-Stars team that beat the Army team 12–0 in the China Bowl on November 30, 1945, in Shanghai.

== Insurance ==
Later, Oberlander served as medical director for National Life Insurance Company of Vermont and Prudential Insurance Company in Chicago and Newark.
