= Carl Diehl =

American college football player

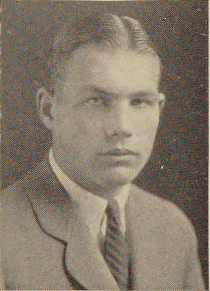
- Diehl, c. 1926

Profile
- Position: Guard

Personal information
- Born: May 2, 1904; Chicago, Illinois, U.S.
- Died: November 13, 1997 (aged 93); Maryland, U.S.
- Listed height: 6 ft 0 in (1.83 m)
- Listed weight: 205 lb (93 kg)

Career information
- High school: Francis W. Parker School (Chicago)
- College: Dartmouth (1923–1925)

Awards and highlights
- 2× Consensus All-American (1924, 1925); First-team All-Eastern (1925)

Carl Herman "Dutch" Diehl (May 2, 1904 – November 13, 1997) was an American college football player.

Listed at 205 pounds (93 kg) and 6 feet 0 1/4 inch (1.835 m), Diehl played at the guard position for the Dartmouth Big Green football team. He was a consensus All-American in 1924 and 1925. He helped Dartmouth win the college football national championship in 1925.

Diehl was one of several members of Dartmouth's undefeated 1925 team who returned to campus in January 1963 to honor the undefeated 1962 team. A member of the class of 1926, Diehl was inducted to the Dartmouth athletics hall of fame (the "wearers of the green") in 1984. Diehl married and had four children. He was living in Catonsville, Maryland, at the time of his death in 1997.
