= Nathan Parker (American football) =

American football player (1904–1991)

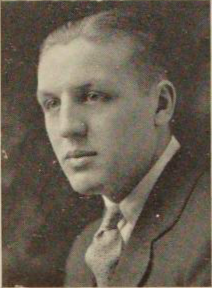
- Parker, c, 1926

Profile
- Position: Tackle

Personal information
- Born: March 9, 1908; Allegheny Township, Westmoreland County, Pennsylvania, U.S.
- Died: May 6, 1991 (age 87); Pittsburgh, Pennsylvania, U.S.
- Listed height: 6 ft 0 in (1.83 m)
- Listed weight: 192 lb (87 kg)

Career information
- High school: Bellevue High School (Penn.)
- College: Dartmouth (1923–1925)

Awards and highlights
- First-team All-American (1925); First-team All-Eastern (1925)

Nathan Kuhns Parker (March 9, 1904 – May 6, 1991) was an American football player. Parker attended Bellevue High School in Bellevue, Pennsylvania, before enrolling at Dartmouth College. He played college football at the tackle position for the Dartmouth Big Green football team from 1923 to 1925. He was the captain of the undefeated 1925 team, and was selected by the United Press as a first-team player on the 1925 College Football All-America Team. He later became a Rhodes Scholar.

Parker later formed a brokerage firm, Parker-Hunter, in Pittsburgh. He was also a member of the board of the New York Stock Exchange. He died in Pittsburgh in 1991 at age 87.
