= 1925 Manhattan College football team =

American college football season

1925 Manhattan College football
- Conference: Independent
- Record: 1–6–1
- Head coach: James F. McCarthy (1st season)
- Home stadium: Catholic Protectory Oval

1925 Eastern college football independents records
	Conf.			Overall
Team	W	L	T	W		L		T
No. 1 Dartmouth		–		8	–	0	–	0
Fordham		–		9	–	1	–	0
No. 4 Colgate		–		7	–	0	–	2
No. 10 Pittsburgh		–		8	–	1	–	0
Syracuse		–		8	–	1	–	1
No. 11 Lafayette		–		7	–	1	–	1
Springfield		–		6	–	1	–	1
Princeton		–		5	–	1	–	1
Holy Cross		–		8	–	2	–	0
Penn		–		7	–	2	–	0
Army		–		7	–	2	–	0
Boston College		–		6	–	2	–	0
Cornell		–		6	–	2	–	0
NYU		–		6	–	2	–	1
Villanova		–		6	–	2	–	1
Washington & Jefferson		–		6	–	2	–	1
Carnegie Tech		–		5	–	2	–	1
Yale		–		5	–	2	–	1
Bucknell		–		7	–	3	–	1
Columbia		–		6	–	3	–	1
Muhlenberg		–		6	–	3	–	1
Temple		–		5	–	2	–	2
Harvard		–		4	–	3	–	1
Franklin & Marshall		–		5	–	4	–	0
Brown		–		5	–	4	–	1
Penn State		–		4	–	4	–	1
Buffalo		–		3	–	4	–	1
St. John's		–		3	–	4	–	0
Lehigh		–		3	–	5	–	1
Vermont		–		3	–	6	–	0
CCNY		–		2	–	5	–	0
Providence		–		2	–	7	–	0
Rutgers		–		2	–	7	–	0
Boston University		–		1	–	5	–	0
Manhattan		–		1	–	6	–	1
Tufts		–		1	–	6	–	0
Drexel		–		1	–	7	–	0
Rankings from Dickinson System

The 1925 Manhattan College football team was an American football team that represented Manhattan College as an independent during the 1925 college football season. In its first season under head coach James F. McCarthy, the team compiled a 1–6–1 record and was outscored by a total of 216 to 47.

== Schedule ==
Date	Opponent	Site	Result	Attendance	Source
September 26	at Holy Cross	Fitton Field; Worcester, MA	L 0-41		
October 10	New York Aggies	Catholic Protectory Oval; New York, NY	W 34–7		
October 17	at Fordham	Fordham Field; New York, NY	L 0–55		
October 24	at Saint Joseph's	Baker Bowl; Philadelphia, PA	L 6–13		
October 31	at Connecticut	Gardner Dow Athletic Fields; Storrs, CT	L 0–19		
November 7	at CCNY	Lewisohn Stadium; New York, NY	L 0–13		
November 14	at Scranton	Scranton, PA	T 7–7		
November 21	at Western Maryland	Hoffa Field; Westminster, MD	L 0–61		
