= 1925 Muhlenberg Cardinals football team =

American college football season

1925 Muhlenberg Cardinals football
- Conference: Independent
- Record: 6–3–1
- Head coach: Haps Benfer (1st season)
- Home stadium: Muhlenberg Field

1925 Eastern college football independents records
	Conf.			Overall
Team	W	L	T	W		L		T
No. 1 Dartmouth		–		8	–	0	–	0
Fordham		–		9	–	1	–	0
No. 4 Colgate		–		7	–	0	–	2
No. 10 Pittsburgh		–		8	–	1	–	0
Syracuse		–		8	–	1	–	1
No. 11 Lafayette		–		7	–	1	–	1
Springfield		–		6	–	1	–	1
Princeton		–		5	–	1	–	1
Holy Cross		–		8	–	2	–	0
Penn		–		7	–	2	–	0
Army		–		7	–	2	–	0
Boston College		–		6	–	2	–	0
Cornell		–		6	–	2	–	0
NYU		–		6	–	2	–	1
Villanova		–		6	–	2	–	1
Washington & Jefferson		–		6	–	2	–	1
Carnegie Tech		–		5	–	2	–	1
Yale		–		5	–	2	–	1
Bucknell		–		7	–	3	–	1
Columbia		–		6	–	3	–	1
Muhlenberg		–		6	–	3	–	1
Temple		–		5	–	2	–	2
Harvard		–		4	–	3	–	1
Franklin & Marshall		–		5	–	4	–	0
Brown		–		5	–	4	–	1
Penn State		–		4	–	4	–	1
Buffalo		–		3	–	4	–	1
St. John's		–		3	–	4	–	0
Lehigh		–		3	–	5	–	1
Vermont		–		3	–	6	–	0
CCNY		–		2	–	5	–	0
Providence		–		2	–	7	–	0
Rutgers		–		2	–	7	–	0
Boston University		–		1	–	5	–	0
Manhattan		–		1	–	6	–	1
Tufts		–		1	–	6	–	0
Drexel		–		1	–	7	–	0
Rankings from Dickinson System

The 1925 Muhlenberg Cardinals football team was an American football team that represented Muhlenberg College as an independent during the 1925 college football season. Led by first-year head coach Haps Benfer, Muhlenberg finished the season with a record of 6–3–1.

== Schedule ==
Date	Opponent	Site	Result	Attendance	Source
September 19	East Stroudsburg	Muhlenberg Field; Allentown, PA	W 36–0		
September 26	at Lafayette	March Field; Easton, PA	L 14–20		
October 3	Albright	Muhlenberg Field; Allentown, PA	W 21–0		
October 10	at Gettysburg	Gettysburg, PA	L 0–21		
October 17	Lebanon Valley	Muhlenberg Field; Allentown, PA	W 14–0		
October 24	Dickinson	Muhlenberg Field; Allentown, PA	T 0–0		
October 31	at Lehigh	Taylor Stadium; Bethlehem, PA	W 9–7		
November 7	Franklin & Marshall	Muhlenberg Field; Allentown, PA	W 38–7		
November 14	at Catholic University	Washington, DC	W 7–0		
November 26	Villanova	Muhlenberg Field; Allentown, PA	L 9–23	15,000	
