= 1925 Princeton Tigers football team =

American college football season

1925 Princeton Tigers football
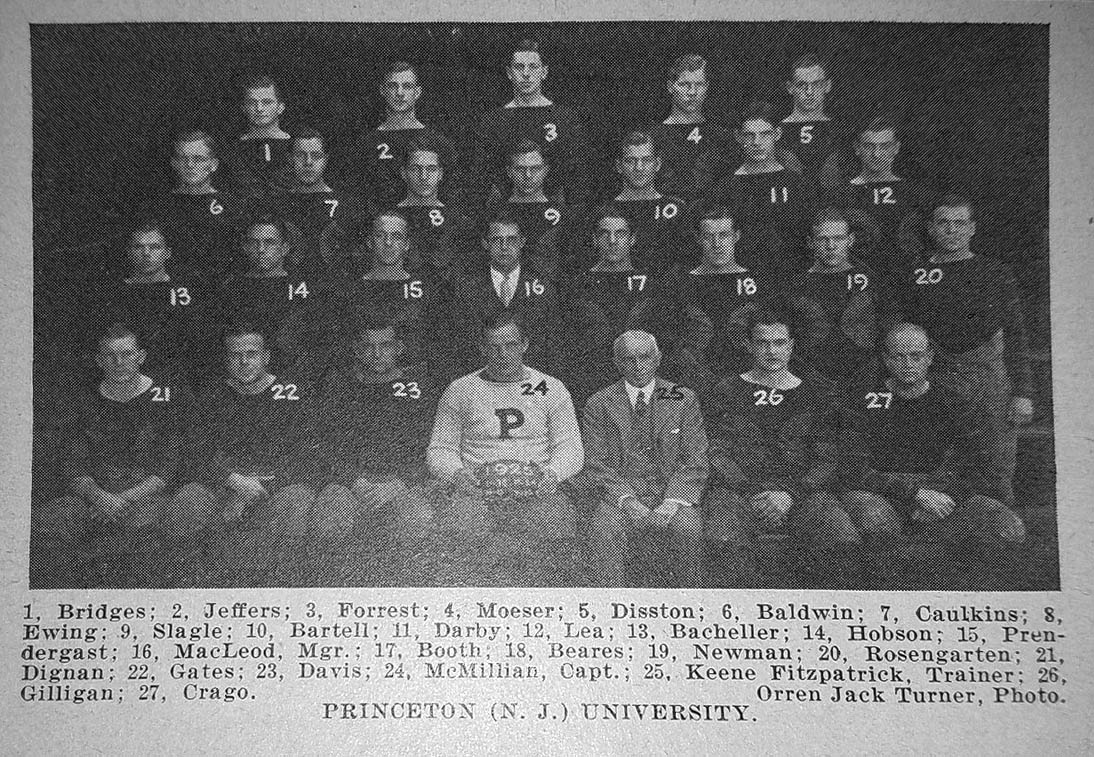
- Conference: Independent
- Record: 5–1–1
- Head coach: Bill Roper (12th season)
- Captain: Ed McMillan
- Home stadium: Palmer Stadium

1925 Eastern college football independents records
	Conf.			Overall
Team	W	L	T	W		L		T
No. 1 Dartmouth		–		8	–	0	–	0
Fordham		–		9	–	1	–	0
No. 4 Colgate		–		7	–	0	–	2
No. 10 Pittsburgh		–		8	–	1	–	0
Syracuse		–		8	–	1	–	1
No. 11 Lafayette		–		7	–	1	–	1
Springfield		–		6	–	1	–	1
Princeton		–		5	–	1	–	1
Holy Cross		–		8	–	2	–	0
Penn		–		7	–	2	–	0
Army		–		7	–	2	–	0
Boston College		–		6	–	2	–	0
Cornell		–		6	–	2	–	0
NYU		–		6	–	2	–	1
Villanova		–		6	–	2	–	1
Washington & Jefferson		–		6	–	2	–	1
Carnegie Tech		–		5	–	2	–	1
Yale		–		5	–	2	–	1
Bucknell		–		7	–	3	–	1
Columbia		–		6	–	3	–	1
Muhlenberg		–		6	–	3	–	1
Temple		–		5	–	2	–	2
Harvard		–		4	–	3	–	1
Franklin & Marshall		–		5	–	4	–	0
Brown		–		5	–	4	–	1
Penn State		–		4	–	4	–	1
Buffalo		–		3	–	4	–	1
St. John's		–		3	–	4	–	0
Lehigh		–		3	–	5	–	1
Vermont		–		3	–	6	–	0
CCNY		–		2	–	5	–	0
Providence		–		2	–	7	–	0
Rutgers		–		2	–	7	–	0
Boston University		–		1	–	5	–	0
Manhattan		–		1	–	6	–	1
Tufts		–		1	–	6	–	0
Drexel		–		1	–	7	–	0
Rankings from Dickinson System

The 1925 Princeton Tigers football team was an American football team that represented Princeton University as an independent during the 1925 college football season. In its 12th season under head coach Bill Roper, the team compiled a 5–1–1 record and outscored opponents by a total of 125 to 44. The team's sole loss was to Colgate by a 9–0 score.

Princeton center Ed McMillan was a consensus first-team honoree on the 1925 College Football All-America Team, and fullback Jacob Slagle was picked as a first-team honoree by the United Press.

== Schedule ==
Date	Opponent	Site	Result	Attendance	Source
October 3	Amherst	Palmer Stadium; Princeton, NJ	W 20–0		
October 10	Washington and Lee	Palmer Stadium; Princeton, NJ	W 15–6	8,000	
October 17	at Navy	Baltimore Stadium; Baltimore, MD	T 10–10		
October 24	Colgate	Palmer Stadium; Princeton, NJ	L 0–9		
October 31	Swarthmore	Palmer Stadium; Princeton, NJ	W 19–7		
November 7	Harvard	Palmer Stadium; Princeton, NJ (rivalry)	W 36–0	55,000	
November 14	at Yale	Yale Bowl; New Haven, CT (rivalry)	W 25–12	78,000	
