= 1925 Springfield Red and White football team =

American college football season

1925 Springfield Red and White football
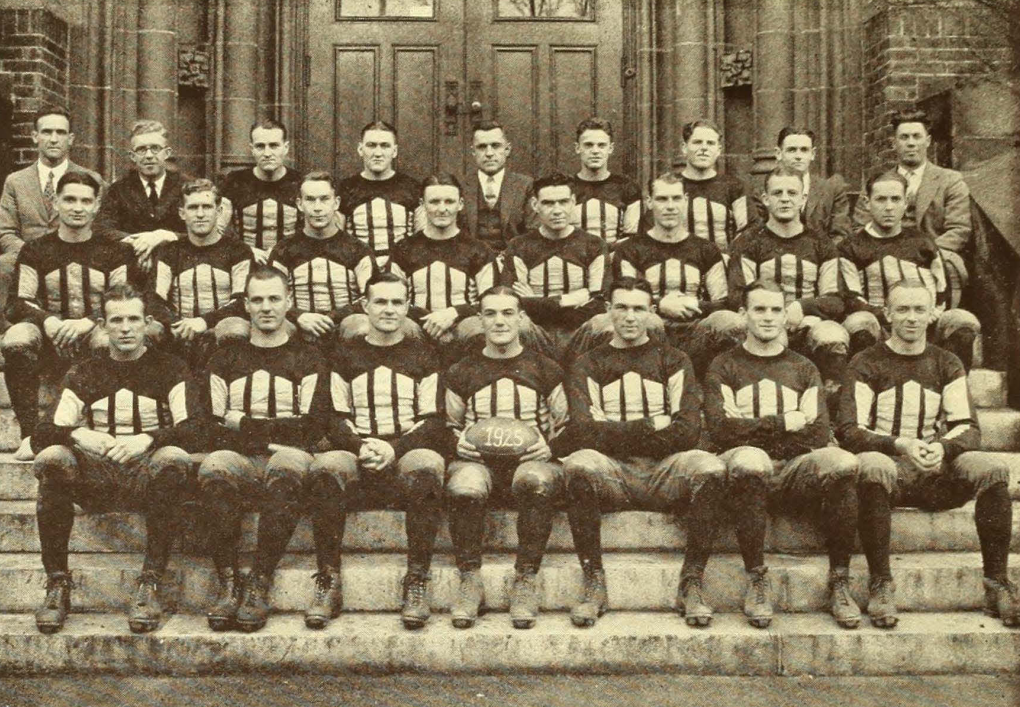
- Conference: Independent
- Record: 6–1–1
- Head coach: John L. Rothacher (2nd season)
- Captain: Robert G. Elliott
- Home stadium: Pratt Field

1925 Eastern college football independents records
	Conf.			Overall
Team	W	L	T	W		L		T
No. 1 Dartmouth		–		8	–	0	–	0
Fordham		–		9	–	1	–	0
No. 4 Colgate		–		7	–	0	–	2
No. 10 Pittsburgh		–		8	–	1	–	0
Syracuse		–		8	–	1	–	1
No. 11 Lafayette		–		7	–	1	–	1
Springfield		–		6	–	1	–	1
Princeton		–		5	–	1	–	1
Holy Cross		–		8	–	2	–	0
Penn		–		7	–	2	–	0
Army		–		7	–	2	–	0
Boston College		–		6	–	2	–	0
Cornell		–		6	–	2	–	0
NYU		–		6	–	2	–	1
Villanova		–		6	–	2	–	1
Washington & Jefferson		–		6	–	2	–	1
Carnegie Tech		–		5	–	2	–	1
Yale		–		5	–	2	–	1
Bucknell		–		7	–	3	–	1
Columbia		–		6	–	3	–	1
Muhlenberg		–		6	–	3	–	1
Temple		–		5	–	2	–	2
Harvard		–		4	–	3	–	1
Franklin & Marshall		–		5	–	4	–	0
Brown		–		5	–	4	–	1
Penn State		–		4	–	4	–	1
Buffalo		–		3	–	4	–	1
St. John's		–		3	–	4	–	0
Lehigh		–		3	–	5	–	1
Vermont		–		3	–	6	–	0
CCNY		–		2	–	5	–	0
Providence		–		2	–	7	–	0
Rutgers		–		2	–	7	–	0
Boston University		–		1	–	5	–	0
Manhattan		–		1	–	6	–	1
Tufts		–		1	–	6	–	0
Drexel		–		1	–	7	–	0
Rankings from Dickinson System

The 1925 Springfield Red and White football team was an American football team that represented Springfield College during the 1925 college football season. In its second season under head coach John L. Rothacher, the team compiled a 6–1–1 record, outscored opponents by a total of 145 to 52, and played its home games at Pratt Field in Springfield, Massachusetts. Boston Braves outfielder Leslie Mann served as an assistant coach.

Key players included halfback "Tex" Maddox, quarterback Bob Berry, fullback Mahnken, end Crawley. Center Robert G. Elliott was the team captain.

== Schedule ==
Date	Opponent	Site	Result	Source
October 3	Cooper Union	Pratt Field; Springfield, MA	W 50–0	
October 10	Rensselaer Polytechnic	Pratt Field; Springfield, MA	W 24–0	
October 17	Vermont	Pratt Field; Springfield, MA	W 6–0	
October 24	at New Hampshire	Memorial Field; Durham, NH	T 10–10	
October 31	Boston University	Pratt Field; Springfield, MA	W 20–0	
November 7	at Amherst	Amherst, MA	L 0–16	
November 21	Providence College	Pratt Field; Springfield, MA	W 17–13	
November 26	Massachusetts	Pratt Field; Springfield, MA	W 18–13	
