= 1925 Buffalo Bisons football team =

American college football season

1925 Buffalo Bisons football
- Conference: Independent
- Record: 3–4–1
- Head coach: Russ Carrick (2nd season)
- Home stadium: Rotary Field

1925 Eastern college football independents records
	Conf.			Overall
Team	W	L	T	W		L		T
No. 1 Dartmouth		–		8	–	0	–	0
Fordham		–		9	–	1	–	0
No. 4 Colgate		–		7	–	0	–	2
No. 10 Pittsburgh		–		8	–	1	–	0
Syracuse		–		8	–	1	–	1
No. 11 Lafayette		–		7	–	1	–	1
Springfield		–		6	–	1	–	1
Princeton		–		5	–	1	–	1
Holy Cross		–		8	–	2	–	0
Penn		–		7	–	2	–	0
Army		–		7	–	2	–	0
Boston College		–		6	–	2	–	0
Cornell		–		6	–	2	–	0
NYU		–		6	–	2	–	1
Villanova		–		6	–	2	–	1
Washington & Jefferson		–		6	–	2	–	1
Carnegie Tech		–		5	–	2	–	1
Yale		–		5	–	2	–	1
Bucknell		–		7	–	3	–	1
Columbia		–		6	–	3	–	1
Muhlenberg		–		6	–	3	–	1
Temple		–		5	–	2	–	2
Harvard		–		4	–	3	–	1
Franklin & Marshall		–		5	–	4	–	0
Brown		–		5	–	4	–	1
Penn State		–		4	–	4	–	1
Buffalo		–		3	–	4	–	1
St. John's		–		3	–	4	–	0
Lehigh		–		3	–	5	–	1
Vermont		–		3	–	6	–	0
CCNY		–		2	–	5	–	0
Providence		–		2	–	7	–	0
Rutgers		–		2	–	7	–	0
Boston University		–		1	–	5	–	0
Manhattan		–		1	–	6	–	1
Tufts		–		1	–	6	–	0
Drexel		–		1	–	7	–	0
Rankings from Dickinson System

The 1925 Buffalo Bisons football team represented the University of Buffalo as an independent during the 1925 college football season. Led by Russ Carrick in his second season as head coach, the team compiled a record of 3–4–1.

== Schedule ==
Date	Opponent	Site	Result	Source
October 3	Toledo	Rotary Field; Buffalo, NY	W 2–0	
October 10	Westminster (PA)	Rotary Field; Buffalo, NY	L 0–8	
October 17	Rochester	Rotary Field; Buffalo, NY	T 0–0	
October 24	Davis & Elkins	Rotary Field; Buffalo, NY	L 0–40	
October 30	at Alfred	Alfred Field; Alfred, NY	W 6–0	
November 7	Clarkson	Rotary Field; Buffalo, NY	W 10–2	
November 14	at Hobart	Boswell Field; Geneva, NY	L 0–13	
November 21	at George Washington	Wilson Memorial Stadium; Washington, DC	L 0–59	
