= Haps Benfer =

American football and basketball player and college coach and administrator

- Benfer photo in the Reading Eagle in January 1966

Biographical details
- Born: October 24, 1893; Lock Haven, Pennsylvania, U.S.
- Died: January 2, 1966 (aged 72); Allentown, Pennsylvania, U.S.

Playing career

Football
- 1914: Albright
- Position: Fullback

Coaching career (HC unless noted)

Football
- 1916–1917: Western Union
- 1919–1924: Albright
- 1925–1928: Muhlenberg

Basketball
- 1918–1919: Bucknell
- 1919–1926: Albright
- 1925–1929: Muhlenberg

Baseball
- 1919: Bucknell
- 1926–1929: Muhlenberg

Accomplishments and honors

Championships
- Football; 1 Eastern Pennsylvania Collegiate (1926)

Harold Arthur "Haps" Benfer (October 24, 1893 – January 2, 1966) was an American college football and college basketball player and coach. He was selected as a first-team All-American fullback while playing for Albright College in 1914. He later spent 40 years as an athletic coach and administrator at Muhlenberg College.

== Early life and education ==
Benfer was born in Lock Haven, Pennsylvania, on October 24, 1893, to Anna Leah Hengst and Henry Abraham Benfer, a prominent Evangelical minister. Benfer became a five-sport star athlete at William Penn High School. He became the first York County, Pennsylvania high school basketball player to score 1,000 points in basketball. His 1,101 points scored for William Penn High School, including 531 points as a junior, was the school's career scoring record for nearly 70 years, and he also set the school's single-game scoring record with 50 points against Steelton on January 6, 1911. Benfer was also a star for William Penn's football team for three years and played goalkeeper on the school's first soccer team in 1910.

After graduating from York High School, Benfer enrolled at Albright College in Reading, Pennsylvania. At Albright, he played football, basketball, and baseball. He played fullback for the football team and was selected as a first-team All-American fullback in 1914 by the Philadelphia Evening Bulletin. He was also named Albright College's "Athlete of the Century" in 1956.

After graduating from Albright College, Benfer received a post-graduate education at the University of Pennsylvania and University of Illinois and was ordained as a minister of the United Evangelical Church. In 1916, while serving as a minister at Hummels Wharf, Pennsylvania, he became engaged to Mabel M. Hoffman.

== Career ==
Benfer served as the head football coach at Western Union College—later known as Westmar University—in LeMars, Iowa from 1916 to 1917.

Benfer later worked as a teacher, coach, and administrator for 50 years. He also played baseball for St. Louis Cardinals' farm teams for two summers. He was the basketball and baseball coach at Bucknell University from 1918 to 1919. He then returned to Albright College where he served as the athletic director and taught Latin and history until 1925. From 1925 to 1965, he worked at Muhlenberg College as a teacher of religion and a coach of football, basketball and baseball. He was also Muhlenberg's director of admissions from 1935 to 1963 and the director of men's dormitories until his poor health forced him to retire in August 1965.

He was also known for his work on behalf of American Legion baseball. He served as chairman of the Pennsylvania American Legion state championship tournament.

Benfer died at his home in Allentown, Pennsylvania, in January 1966 at age 73. He was survived by his wife, the former Mabel Hoffman, and a son, Robert H. Benfer.

As a tribute to Benfer, Albright College awards the Haps Benfer Trophy to an outstanding student athlete each year, and Muhlenberg dedicated Benfer Hall, a dormitory, in the fall of 1965. In 1963, he was also inducted into the Pennsylvania Sports Hall of Fame in Hershey, Pennsylvania.

== Head coaching record ==
=== Football ===
Year	Team	Overall	Conference	Standing	Bowl/playoffs
Western Union Eagles (Independent) (1916–1917)
1916	Western Union				
1917	Western Union				
Western Union:					
Albright Red and White (Independent) (1919–1924)
1919	Albright	1–6			
1920	Albright	4–2			
1921	Albright	4–3			
1922	Albright	6–3			
1923	Albright	2–6			
1924	Albright	3–6			
Albright:		20–24			
Muhlenberg Cardinals (Independent) (1925)
1925	Muhlenberg	6–3–1			
Muhlenberg Cardinals (Eastern Pennsylvania Collegiate Conference / Central Pennsylvania Conference) (1926–1928)
1926	Muhlenberg	7–3	3–0	1st	
1927	Muhlenberg	5–4	2–2	3rd	
1928	Muhlenberg	1–8	1–3	T–4th	
Muhlenberg:		19–18–1	6–5		
Total:					
National championship Conference title Conference division title or championship game berth

== See also ==
- 1914 College Football All-America Team
