= 1925 Lehigh Brown and White football team =

American college football season

1925 Lehigh Brown and White football
- Conference: Independent
- Record: 3–5–1
- Head coach: Percy Wendell (1st season)
- Home stadium: Taylor Stadium

1925 Eastern college football independents records
	Conf.			Overall
Team	W	L	T	W		L		T
No. 1 Dartmouth		–		8	–	0	–	0
Fordham		–		9	–	1	–	0
No. 4 Colgate		–		7	–	0	–	2
No. 10 Pittsburgh		–		8	–	1	–	0
Syracuse		–		8	–	1	–	1
No. 11 Lafayette		–		7	–	1	–	1
Springfield		–		6	–	1	–	1
Princeton		–		5	–	1	–	1
Holy Cross		–		8	–	2	–	0
Penn		–		7	–	2	–	0
Army		–		7	–	2	–	0
Boston College		–		6	–	2	–	0
Cornell		–		6	–	2	–	0
NYU		–		6	–	2	–	1
Villanova		–		6	–	2	–	1
Washington & Jefferson		–		6	–	2	–	1
Carnegie Tech		–		5	–	2	–	1
Yale		–		5	–	2	–	1
Bucknell		–		7	–	3	–	1
Columbia		–		6	–	3	–	1
Muhlenberg		–		6	–	3	–	1
Temple		–		5	–	2	–	2
Harvard		–		4	–	3	–	1
Franklin & Marshall		–		5	–	4	–	0
Brown		–		5	–	4	–	1
Penn State		–		4	–	4	–	1
Buffalo		–		3	–	4	–	1
St. John's		–		3	–	4	–	0
Lehigh		–		3	–	5	–	1
Vermont		–		3	–	6	–	0
CCNY		–		2	–	5	–	0
Providence		–		2	–	7	–	0
Rutgers		–		2	–	7	–	0
Boston University		–		1	–	5	–	0
Manhattan		–		1	–	6	–	1
Tufts		–		1	–	6	–	0
Drexel		–		1	–	7	–	0
Rankings from Dickinson System

The 1925 Lehigh Brown and White football team was an American football team that represented Lehigh University during the 1925 college football season. In its first season under head coach Percy Wendell, the team compiled a 3–5–1 record. Lehigh played home games at Taylor Stadium in Bethlehem, Pennsylvania.

== Schedule ==
Date	Opponent	Site	Result	Attendance	Source
October 3	at Gettysburg	Memorial Field; Gettysburg, PA	T 7–7	10,000	
October 10	Drexel	Taylor Stadium; Bethlehem, PA	W 38–0		
October 17	West Virginia Wesleyan	Taylor Stadium; Bethlehem, PA	W 3–0		
October 24	at Rutgers	Neilson Field; New Brunswick, NJ	W 7–0		
October 31	Muhlenberg	Taylor Stadium; Bethlehem, PA	L 7–9		
November 7	at Georgetown	Griffith Stadium; Washington, DC	L 0–40		
November 14	Villanova	Taylor Stadium; Bethlehem, PA	L 0–6		
November 21	Lafayette	Taylor Stadium; Bethlehem, PA	L 0–14		
November 28	at Carnegie Tech	Forbes Field; Pittsburgh, PA	L 0–37	8,000	
