= 1925 Fordham Maroon football team =

American college football season

1925 Fordham Maroon football
- Conference: Independent
- Record: 8–1
- Head coach: Frank Gargan (6th season)
- Captain: James Manning
- Home stadium: Fordham Field, Polo Grounds

1925 Eastern college football independents records
	Conf.			Overall
Team	W	L	T	W		L		T
No. 1 Dartmouth		–		8	–	0	–	0
Fordham		–		9	–	1	–	0
No. 4 Colgate		–		7	–	0	–	2
No. 10 Pittsburgh		–		8	–	1	–	0
Syracuse		–		8	–	1	–	1
No. 11 Lafayette		–		7	–	1	–	1
Springfield		–		6	–	1	–	1
Princeton		–		5	–	1	–	1
Holy Cross		–		8	–	2	–	0
Penn		–		7	–	2	–	0
Army		–		7	–	2	–	0
Boston College		–		6	–	2	–	0
Cornell		–		6	–	2	–	0
NYU		–		6	–	2	–	1
Villanova		–		6	–	2	–	1
Washington & Jefferson		–		6	–	2	–	1
Carnegie Tech		–		5	–	2	–	1
Yale		–		5	–	2	–	1
Bucknell		–		7	–	3	–	1
Columbia		–		6	–	3	–	1
Muhlenberg		–		6	–	3	–	1
Temple		–		5	–	2	–	2
Harvard		–		4	–	3	–	1
Franklin & Marshall		–		5	–	4	–	0
Brown		–		5	–	4	–	1
Penn State		–		4	–	4	–	1
Buffalo		–		3	–	4	–	1
St. John's		–		3	–	4	–	0
Lehigh		–		3	–	5	–	1
Vermont		–		3	–	6	–	0
CCNY		–		2	–	5	–	0
Providence		–		2	–	7	–	0
Rutgers		–		2	–	7	–	0
Boston University		–		1	–	5	–	0
Manhattan		–		1	–	6	–	1
Tufts		–		1	–	6	–	0
Drexel		–		1	–	7	–	0
Rankings from Dickinson System

The 1925 Fordham Maroon football team was an American football team that represented Fordham University as an independent during the 1925 college football season. In its sixth season under head coach Frank Gargan, Fordham compiled an 8–1 record. James Manning was the team captain.

== Schedule ==
Date	Opponent	Site	Result	Attendance	Source
October 3	Providence	Fordham Field; New York, NY	W 20–6		
October 10	Gallaudet	Fordham Field; New York, NY	W 60–0		
October 17	Manhattan	Fordham Field; New York, NY	W 55–0		
October 24	at Akron	Buchtel Field; Akron, OH	W 28–0		
October 31	vs. NYU	Yankee Stadium; New York, NY	W 26–6	> 15,000	
November 7	Holy Cross	Polo Grounds; New York, NY	W 17–0	25,000	
November 14	CCNY	Fordham Field; New York, NY	W 76–0		
November 21	Georgetown	Polo Grounds; New York, NY	L 0–27	30,000	
November 26	at John Carroll	University Heights, OH	W 13–7		
