= 1925 Yale Bulldogs football team =

American college football season

1925 Yale Bulldogs football
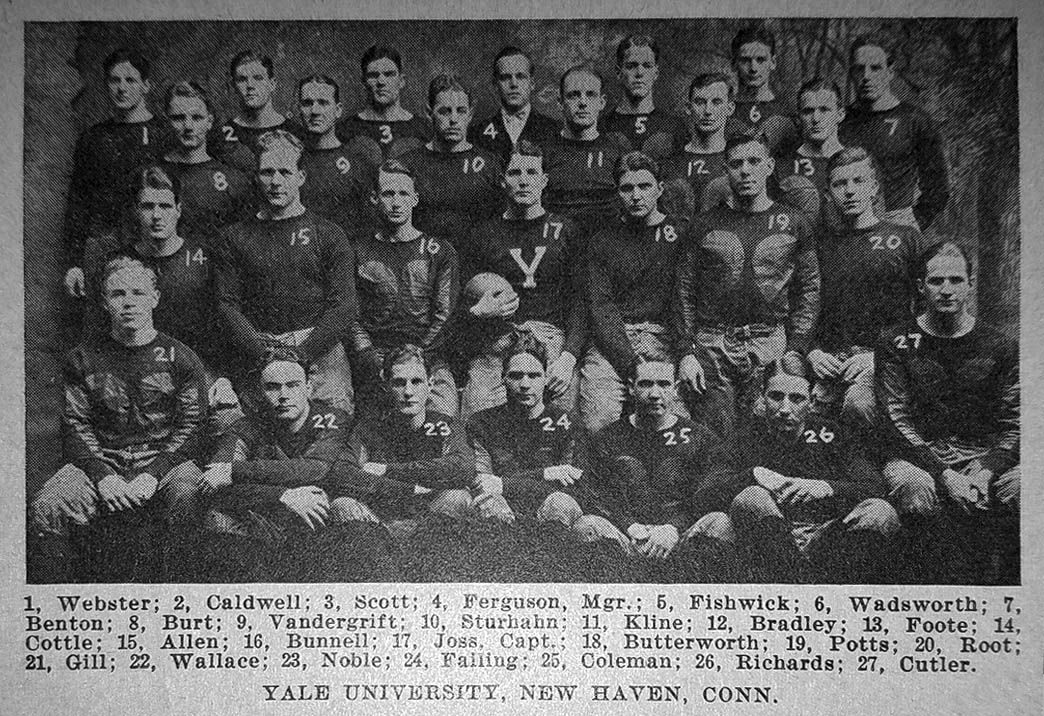
- Conference: Independent
- Record: 5–2–1
- Head coach: Tad Jones (8th season)
- Offensive scheme: Single-wing
- Captain: Johnny Joss
- Home stadium: Yale Bowl

1925 Eastern college football independents records
	Conf.			Overall
Team	W	L	T	W		L		T
No. 1 Dartmouth		–		8	–	0	–	0
Fordham		–		9	–	1	–	0
No. 4 Colgate		–		7	–	0	–	2
No. 10 Pittsburgh		–		8	–	1	–	0
Syracuse		–		8	–	1	–	1
No. 11 Lafayette		–		7	–	1	–	1
Springfield		–		6	–	1	–	1
Princeton		–		5	–	1	–	1
Holy Cross		–		8	–	2	–	0
Penn		–		7	–	2	–	0
Army		–		7	–	2	–	0
Boston College		–		6	–	2	–	0
Cornell		–		6	–	2	–	0
NYU		–		6	–	2	–	1
Villanova		–		6	–	2	–	1
Washington & Jefferson		–		6	–	2	–	1
Carnegie Tech		–		5	–	2	–	1
Yale		–		5	–	2	–	1
Bucknell		–		7	–	3	–	1
Columbia		–		6	–	3	–	1
Muhlenberg		–		6	–	3	–	1
Temple		–		5	–	2	–	2
Harvard		–		4	–	3	–	1
Franklin & Marshall		–		5	–	4	–	0
Brown		–		5	–	4	–	1
Penn State		–		4	–	4	–	1
Buffalo		–		3	–	4	–	1
St. John's		–		3	–	4	–	0
Lehigh		–		3	–	5	–	1
Vermont		–		3	–	6	–	0
CCNY		–		2	–	5	–	0
Providence		–		2	–	7	–	0
Rutgers		–		2	–	7	–	0
Boston University		–		1	–	5	–	0
Manhattan		–		1	–	6	–	1
Tufts		–		1	–	6	–	0
Drexel		–		1	–	7	–	0
Rankings from Dickinson System

The 1925 Yale Bulldogs football team was an American football team that represented Yale University as an independent during the 1925 college football season. In its eighth season under head coach Tad Jones, the team compiled a 5–2–1 record and outscored opponents by a total of 204 to 76.

Yale guard Herbert Sturhahn was named a first-team player on the 1925 College Football All-America Teams selected by the Associated Press, Collier's Weekly, the All-America Board (made up of Tad Jones of Yale, Knute Rockne of Notre Dame and Glenn Scobey Warner of Stanford), and the New York Sun. Sturhahn was also later inducted into the College Football Hall of Fame. Yale tackle Johnny Joss was also named a first-team All-American for 1925 by the New York Sun.

== Schedule ==
Date	Opponent	Site	Result	Attendance	Source
October 3	Middlebury	Yale Bowl; New Haven, CT	W 53–0		
October 10	Georgia	Yale Bowl; New Haven, CT	W 35–7		
October 17	Penn	Yale Bowl; New Haven, CT	L 13–16	60,000	
October 24	at Brown	Brown Stadium; Providence, RI	W 20–7	28,000	
October 31	Army	Yale Bowl; New Haven, CT	W 28–7	80,000	
November 7	Maryland	Yale Bowl; New Haven, CT	W 43–14		
November 14	Princeton	Yale Bowl; New Haven, CT (rivalry)	L 12–25	78,000	
November 21	at Harvard	Harvard Stadium; Boston, MA (rivalry)	T 0–0	52,000	
