= 1925 Harvard Crimson football team =

American college football season

1925 Harvard Crimson football
- Conference: Independent
- Record: 4–3–1
- Head coach: Bob Fisher (7th season)
- Captain: Marion A. Cheek
- Home stadium: Harvard Stadium

1925 Eastern college football independents records
	Conf.			Overall
Team	W	L	T	W		L		T
No. 1 Dartmouth		–		8	–	0	–	0
Fordham		–		9	–	1	–	0
No. 4 Colgate		–		7	–	0	–	2
No. 10 Pittsburgh		–		8	–	1	–	0
Syracuse		–		8	–	1	–	1
No. 11 Lafayette		–		7	–	1	–	1
Springfield		–		6	–	1	–	1
Princeton		–		5	–	1	–	1
Holy Cross		–		8	–	2	–	0
Penn		–		7	–	2	–	0
Army		–		7	–	2	–	0
Boston College		–		6	–	2	–	0
Cornell		–		6	–	2	–	0
NYU		–		6	–	2	–	1
Villanova		–		6	–	2	–	1
Washington & Jefferson		–		6	–	2	–	1
Carnegie Tech		–		5	–	2	–	1
Yale		–		5	–	2	–	1
Bucknell		–		7	–	3	–	1
Columbia		–		6	–	3	–	1
Muhlenberg		–		6	–	3	–	1
Temple		–		5	–	2	–	2
Harvard		–		4	–	3	–	1
Franklin & Marshall		–		5	–	4	–	0
Brown		–		5	–	4	–	1
Penn State		–		4	–	4	–	1
Buffalo		–		3	–	4	–	1
St. John's		–		3	–	4	–	0
Lehigh		–		3	–	5	–	1
Vermont		–		3	–	6	–	0
CCNY		–		2	–	5	–	0
Providence		–		2	–	7	–	0
Rutgers		–		2	–	7	–	0
Boston University		–		1	–	5	–	0
Manhattan		–		1	–	6	–	1
Tufts		–		1	–	6	–	0
Drexel		–		1	–	7	–	0
Rankings from Dickinson System

The 1925 Harvard Crimson football team was an American football team that represented Harvard University as an independent during the 1925 college football season. In its seventh season under head coach Bob Fisher, the team compiled a 4–3–1 record and outscored opponents by a total of 118 to 88. The team played its home games at Harvard Stadium in Boston.

== Schedule ==
Date	Opponent	Site	Result	Attendance	Source
October 3	RPI	Harvard Stadium; Boston, MA	W 18–6		
October 10	Middlebury	Harvard Stadium; Boston, MA	W 68–0		
October 17	Holy Cross	Harvard Stadium; Boston, MA	L 6–7	50,000	
October 24	Dartmouth	Harvard Stadium; Boston, MA	L 9–32	53,000	
October 31	William & Mary	Harvard Stadium; Boston, MA	W 14–7		
November 7	at Princeton	Palmer Stadium; Princeton, NJ	L 0–36	55,000	
November 14	at Brown	Brown Stadium; Providence, RI	W 3–0		
November 21	Yale	Harvard Stadium; Boston, MA (rivalry)	T 0–0	52,000	
