= 1925 Brown Bears football team =

American college football season

1925 Brown Bears football
- Conference: Independent
- Record: 5–4–1
- Head coach: Edward N. Robinson (24th season)
- Home stadium: Brown Stadium

1925 Eastern college football independents records
	Conf.			Overall
Team	W	L	T	W		L		T
No. 1 Dartmouth		–		8	–	0	–	0
Fordham		–		9	–	1	–	0
No. 4 Colgate		–		7	–	0	–	2
No. 10 Pittsburgh		–		8	–	1	–	0
Syracuse		–		8	–	1	–	1
No. 11 Lafayette		–		7	–	1	–	1
Springfield		–		6	–	1	–	1
Princeton		–		5	–	1	–	1
Holy Cross		–		8	–	2	–	0
Penn		–		7	–	2	–	0
Army		–		7	–	2	–	0
Boston College		–		6	–	2	–	0
Cornell		–		6	–	2	–	0
NYU		–		6	–	2	–	1
Villanova		–		6	–	2	–	1
Washington & Jefferson		–		6	–	2	–	1
Carnegie Tech		–		5	–	2	–	1
Yale		–		5	–	2	–	1
Bucknell		–		7	–	3	–	1
Columbia		–		6	–	3	–	1
Muhlenberg		–		6	–	3	–	1
Temple		–		5	–	2	–	2
Harvard		–		4	–	3	–	1
Franklin & Marshall		–		5	–	4	–	0
Brown		–		5	–	4	–	1
Penn State		–		4	–	4	–	1
Buffalo		–		3	–	4	–	1
St. John's		–		3	–	4	–	0
Lehigh		–		3	–	5	–	1
Vermont		–		3	–	6	–	0
CCNY		–		2	–	5	–	0
Providence		–		2	–	7	–	0
Rutgers		–		2	–	7	–	0
Boston University		–		1	–	5	–	0
Manhattan		–		1	–	6	–	1
Tufts		–		1	–	6	–	0
Drexel		–		1	–	7	–	0
Rankings from Dickinson System

The 1925 Brown Bears football team was an American football team that represented Brown University as an independent during the 1925 college football season. In its 24th and final season under head coach Edward N. Robinson, the team compiled a 5–4–1 record and outscored opponents by a total of 215 to 80.

Brown played its home games in the newly-constructed Brown Stadium in Providence, Rhode Island. The stadium was built at a cost of $500,000.

== Schedule ==
Date	Opponent	Site	Result	Attendance	Source
September 26	Rhode Island State	Brown Stadium; Providence, RI (rivalry)	W 33–0		
October 3	Colby	Brown Stadium; Providence, RI	W 33–0		
October 10	Penn	Brown Stadium; Providence, RI	L 0–9		
October 17	Bates	Brown Stadium; Providence, RI	W 48–0		
October 24	Yale	Brown Stadium; Providence, RI	L 7–20	28,000	
October 31	Dartmouth	Brown Stadium; Providence, RI	L 0–14		
November 7	Boston University	Brown Stadium; Providence, RI	W 42–6		
November 14	Harvard	Brown Stadium; Providence, RI	L 0–3		
November 21	New Hampshire	Brown Stadium; Providence, RI	W 38–14		
November 28	Colgate	Brown Stadium; Providence, RI	T 14–14		
