= 1925 St. John's Redmen football team =

American college football season

1925 St. John's Redmen football
- Conference: Independent
- Record: 3–4
- Head coach: Ray Lynch (3rd season)
- Home stadium: Ebbets Field

1925 Eastern college football independents records
	Conf.			Overall
Team	W	L	T	W		L		T
No. 1 Dartmouth		–		8	–	0	–	0
Fordham		–		9	–	1	–	0
No. 4 Colgate		–		7	–	0	–	2
No. 10 Pittsburgh		–		8	–	1	–	0
Syracuse		–		8	–	1	–	1
No. 11 Lafayette		–		7	–	1	–	1
Springfield		–		6	–	1	–	1
Princeton		–		5	–	1	–	1
Holy Cross		–		8	–	2	–	0
Penn		–		7	–	2	–	0
Army		–		7	–	2	–	0
Boston College		–		6	–	2	–	0
Cornell		–		6	–	2	–	0
NYU		–		6	–	2	–	1
Villanova		–		6	–	2	–	1
Washington & Jefferson		–		6	–	2	–	1
Carnegie Tech		–		5	–	2	–	1
Yale		–		5	–	2	–	1
Bucknell		–		7	–	3	–	1
Columbia		–		6	–	3	–	1
Muhlenberg		–		6	–	3	–	1
Temple		–		5	–	2	–	2
Harvard		–		4	–	3	–	1
Franklin & Marshall		–		5	–	4	–	0
Brown		–		5	–	4	–	1
Penn State		–		4	–	4	–	1
Buffalo		–		3	–	4	–	1
St. John's		–		3	–	4	–	0
Lehigh		–		3	–	5	–	1
Vermont		–		3	–	6	–	0
CCNY		–		2	–	5	–	0
Providence		–		2	–	7	–	0
Rutgers		–		2	–	7	–	0
Boston University		–		1	–	5	–	0
Manhattan		–		1	–	6	–	1
Tufts		–		1	–	6	–	0
Drexel		–		1	–	7	–	0
Rankings from Dickinson System

The 1925 St. John's Redmen football team was an American football team that represented St. John's College of New York City during the 1925 college football season. Led by third-year head coach Ray Lynch, the team compiled a 3–4 record and outscored opponents by a total of 81 to 39. The team played its home games at Ebbets Field in Brooklyn.

== Schedule ==
Date	Opponent	Site	Result	Source
October 3	at Holy Cross	Fitton Field; Worcester, MA	L 6–9	
October 10	Boston University	Ebbets Field; Brooklyn, NY	W 14–0	
October 17	Providence	Ebbets Field; Brooklyn, NY	L 6–14	
October 24	at St. Stephen's (NY)	Ebbets Field; Brooklyn, NY	W 22–0	
October 31	Villanova	Ebbets Field; Brooklyn, NY	L 0–7	
November 7	League Island Marines	Ebbets Field; Brooklyn, NY	W 27–0	
November 21	Canisius	Ebbets Field; Brooklyn, NY	L 6–9	
