= 1925 Syracuse Orangemen football team =

American college football season

1925 Syracuse Orangemen football
- Conference: Independent
- Record: 8–1–1
- Head coach: Pete Reynolds (1st season)
- Captain: James Foley
- Home stadium: Archbold Stadium

1925 Eastern college football independents records
	Conf.			Overall
Team	W	L	T	W		L		T
No. 1 Dartmouth		–		8	–	0	–	0
Fordham		–		9	–	1	–	0
No. 4 Colgate		–		7	–	0	–	2
No. 10 Pittsburgh		–		8	–	1	–	0
Syracuse		–		8	–	1	–	1
No. 11 Lafayette		–		7	–	1	–	1
Springfield		–		6	–	1	–	1
Princeton		–		5	–	1	–	1
Holy Cross		–		8	–	2	–	0
Penn		–		7	–	2	–	0
Army		–		7	–	2	–	0
Boston College		–		6	–	2	–	0
Cornell		–		6	–	2	–	0
NYU		–		6	–	2	–	1
Villanova		–		6	–	2	–	1
Washington & Jefferson		–		6	–	2	–	1
Carnegie Tech		–		5	–	2	–	1
Yale		–		5	–	2	–	1
Bucknell		–		7	–	3	–	1
Columbia		–		6	–	3	–	1
Muhlenberg		–		6	–	3	–	1
Temple		–		5	–	2	–	2
Harvard		–		4	–	3	–	1
Franklin & Marshall		–		5	–	4	–	0
Brown		–		5	–	4	–	1
Penn State		–		4	–	4	–	1
Buffalo		–		3	–	4	–	1
St. John's		–		3	–	4	–	0
Lehigh		–		3	–	5	–	1
Vermont		–		3	–	6	–	0
CCNY		–		2	–	5	–	0
Providence		–		2	–	7	–	0
Rutgers		–		2	–	7	–	0
Boston University		–		1	–	5	–	0
Manhattan		–		1	–	6	–	1
Tufts		–		1	–	6	–	0
Drexel		–		1	–	7	–	0
Rankings from Dickinson System

The 1925 Syracuse Orangemen football team was an American football team that represented Syracuse University as an independent during the 1925 college football season. In its first season under head coach Pete Reynolds, the team compiled an 8–1–1 record, shut out seven of ten opponents, and outscored all opponents by a total of 202 to 27.

== Schedule ==
Date	Opponent	Site	Result	Attendance	Source
September 26	Hobart	Archbold Stadium; Syracuse, NY	W 32–0	12,000	
October 3	Vermont	Archbold Stadium; Syracuse, NY	W 26–0	8,000	
October 10	William & Mary	Archbold Stadium; Syracuse, NY	W 33–0	10,000	
October 17	at Indiana	Memorial Stadium; Bloomington, IN	W 14–0	8,000	
October 24	Providence College	Archbold Stadium; Syracuse, NY	W 48–0	5,000	
October 31	Penn State	Archbold Stadium; Syracuse, NY	W 7–0	20,000	
November 7	Ohio Wesleyan	Archbold Stadium; Syracuse, NY	T 3–3	12,000	
November 14	Colgate	Archbold Stadium; Syracuse, NY	L 6–19	30,000	
November 21	Niagara	Archbold Stadium; Syracuse, NY	W 17–0		
November 26	at Columbia	Polo Grounds; New York, NY	W 16–5	30,000	
