= 1925 Lafayette Leopards football team =

American football club

1925 Lafayette Leopards football
- Conference: Independent
- Record: 7–1–1
- Head coach: Herb McCracken (2nd season)
- Captain: Louis Gebhard
- Home stadium: March Field

1925 Eastern college football independents records
	Conf.			Overall
Team	W	L	T	W		L		T
No. 1 Dartmouth		–		8	–	0	–	0
Fordham		–		9	–	1	–	0
No. 4 Colgate		–		7	–	0	–	2
No. 10 Pittsburgh		–		8	–	1	–	0
Syracuse		–		8	–	1	–	1
No. 11 Lafayette		–		7	–	1	–	1
Springfield		–		6	–	1	–	1
Princeton		–		5	–	1	–	1
Holy Cross		–		8	–	2	–	0
Penn		–		7	–	2	–	0
Army		–		7	–	2	–	0
Boston College		–		6	–	2	–	0
Cornell		–		6	–	2	–	0
NYU		–		6	–	2	–	1
Villanova		–		6	–	2	–	1
Washington & Jefferson		–		6	–	2	–	1
Carnegie Tech		–		5	–	2	–	1
Yale		–		5	–	2	–	1
Bucknell		–		7	–	3	–	1
Columbia		–		6	–	3	–	1
Muhlenberg		–		6	–	3	–	1
Temple		–		5	–	2	–	2
Harvard		–		4	–	3	–	1
Franklin & Marshall		–		5	–	4	–	0
Brown		–		5	–	4	–	1
Penn State		–		4	–	4	–	1
Buffalo		–		3	–	4	–	1
St. John's		–		3	–	4	–	0
Lehigh		–		3	–	5	–	1
Vermont		–		3	–	6	–	0
CCNY		–		2	–	5	–	0
Providence		–		2	–	7	–	0
Rutgers		–		2	–	7	–	0
Boston University		–		1	–	5	–	0
Manhattan		–		1	–	6	–	1
Tufts		–		1	–	6	–	0
Drexel		–		1	–	7	–	0
Rankings from Dickinson System

The 1925 Lafayette Leopards football team was an American football team that represented Lafayette College as an independent during the 1925 college football season. In its second season under head coach Herb McCracken, the team compiled a 7–1–1 record. The team's victory over St. Bonaventure on October 31, 1925, marked the start of a 16-game winning streak that continued until October 15, 1927. The team was ranked No. 11 in the nation in the Dickinson System ratings released in January 1926.

== Schedule ==
Date	Opponent	Site	Result	Attendance	Source
September 26	Muhlenberg	March Field; Easton, PA	W 20–14		
October 3	at Pittsburgh	Pitt Stadium; Pittsburgh, PA	W 20–9	30,000	
October 10	Washington College	March Field; Easton, PA	W 40–0		
October 17	vs. Colgate	Franklin Field; Philadelphia, PA	T 7–7		
October 24	vs. Washington & Jefferson	Polo Grounds; New York, NY	L 6–7	10,000	
October 31	St. Bonaventure	March Field; Easton, PA	W 20–6		
November 7	Rutgers	March Field; Easton, PA	W 34–0		
November 14	Susquehanna	March Field; Easton, PA	W 47–0	5,000	
November 21	at Lehigh	Taylor Stadium; Bethlehem, PA	W 14–0		
