= 1925 Penn Quakers football team =

American college football season

1925 Penn Quakers football
- Conference: Independent
- Record: 7–2
- Head coach: Lou Young (3rd season)
- Captain: Joseph Putnam Willson
- Home stadium: Franklin Field

1925 Eastern college football independents records
	Conf.			Overall
Team	W	L	T	W		L		T
No. 1 Dartmouth		–		8	–	0	–	0
Fordham		–		9	–	1	–	0
No. 4 Colgate		–		7	–	0	–	2
No. 10 Pittsburgh		–		8	–	1	–	0
Syracuse		–		8	–	1	–	1
No. 11 Lafayette		–		7	–	1	–	1
Springfield		–		6	–	1	–	1
Princeton		–		5	–	1	–	1
Holy Cross		–		8	–	2	–	0
Penn		–		7	–	2	–	0
Army		–		7	–	2	–	0
Boston College		–		6	–	2	–	0
Cornell		–		6	–	2	–	0
NYU		–		6	–	2	–	1
Villanova		–		6	–	2	–	1
Washington & Jefferson		–		6	–	2	–	1
Carnegie Tech		–		5	–	2	–	1
Yale		–		5	–	2	–	1
Bucknell		–		7	–	3	–	1
Columbia		–		6	–	3	–	1
Muhlenberg		–		6	–	3	–	1
Temple		–		5	–	2	–	2
Harvard		–		4	–	3	–	1
Franklin & Marshall		–		5	–	4	–	0
Brown		–		5	–	4	–	1
Penn State		–		4	–	4	–	1
Buffalo		–		3	–	4	–	1
St. John's		–		3	–	4	–	0
Lehigh		–		3	–	5	–	1
Vermont		–		3	–	6	–	0
CCNY		–		2	–	5	–	0
Providence		–		2	–	7	–	0
Rutgers		–		2	–	7	–	0
Boston University		–		1	–	5	–	0
Manhattan		–		1	–	6	–	1
Tufts		–		1	–	6	–	0
Drexel		–		1	–	7	–	0
Rankings from Dickinson System

The 1925 Penn Quakers football team was an American football team that represented the University of Pennsylvania as an independent during the 1925 college football season. In its third season under head coach Lou Young, the team compiled a 7–2 record and outscored opponents by a total of 165 to 64. Joseph Putnam Willson was the team captain. The team played its home games at Franklin Field in Philadelphia.

== Schedule ==
Date	Opponent	Site	Result	Attendance	Source
September 26	Ursinus	Franklin Field; Philadelphia, PA	W 32–0	45,000	
October 3	Swarthmore	Franklin Field; Philadelphia, PA	W 26–13	50,000	
October 10	at Brown	Andrews Field; Providence, RI	W 9–0		
October 17	at Yale	Yale Bowl; New Haven, CT	W 16–13	60,000	
October 24	Chicago	Franklin Field; Philadelphia, PA	W 7–0	55,000	
October 31	Illinois	Franklin Field; Philadelphia, PA	L 2–24	60,000	
November 7	Haverford	Franklin Field; Philadelphia, PA	W 66–0	30,000	
November 14	Pittsburgh	Franklin Field; Philadelphia, PA	L 0–14	54,000	
November 26	Cornell	Franklin Field; Philadelphia, PA (rivalry)	W 7–0	71,000	
