= 1925 Colgate football team =

American college football season

1925 Colgate football
- Conference: Independent
- Record: 7–0–2
- Head coach: Dick Harlow (4th season)
- Captain: Eddie Tryon
- Home stadium: Whitnall Field

1925 Eastern college football independents records
	Conf.			Overall
Team	W	L	T	W		L		T
No. 1 Dartmouth		–		8	–	0	–	0
Fordham		–		9	–	1	–	0
No. 4 Colgate		–		7	–	0	–	2
No. 10 Pittsburgh		–		8	–	1	–	0
Syracuse		–		8	–	1	–	1
No. 11 Lafayette		–		7	–	1	–	1
Springfield		–		6	–	1	–	1
Princeton		–		5	–	1	–	1
Holy Cross		–		8	–	2	–	0
Penn		–		7	–	2	–	0
Army		–		7	–	2	–	0
Boston College		–		6	–	2	–	0
Cornell		–		6	–	2	–	0
NYU		–		6	–	2	–	1
Villanova		–		6	–	2	–	1
Washington & Jefferson		–		6	–	2	–	1
Carnegie Tech		–		5	–	2	–	1
Yale		–		5	–	2	–	1
Bucknell		–		7	–	3	–	1
Columbia		–		6	–	3	–	1
Muhlenberg		–		6	–	3	–	1
Temple		–		5	–	2	–	2
Harvard		–		4	–	3	–	1
Franklin & Marshall		–		5	–	4	–	0
Brown		–		5	–	4	–	1
Penn State		–		4	–	4	–	1
Buffalo		–		3	–	4	–	1
St. John's		–		3	–	4	–	0
Lehigh		–		3	–	5	–	1
Vermont		–		3	–	6	–	0
CCNY		–		2	–	5	–	0
Providence		–		2	–	7	–	0
Rutgers		–		2	–	7	–	0
Boston University		–		1	–	5	–	0
Manhattan		–		1	–	6	–	1
Tufts		–		1	–	6	–	0
Drexel		–		1	–	7	–	0
Rankings from Dickinson System

The 1925 Colgate football team was an American football team that represented Colgate University as an independent during the 1927 college football season. In its fourth and final season under head coach Dick Harlow, the team compiled a 7–0–2 record, shut out five of nine opponents, and outscored all opponents by a total of 219 to 34. The team was ranked No. 4 in the nation in the Dickinson System ratings released in January 1926.

Halfback and team captain Eddie Tryon was the leader on offense. Against St. Bonaventure, he scored 30 points in the 22 minutes he played, including touchdowns on an 85-yard kickoff return and six extra points. He was selected by the Football Writers Association of America (FWAA), Athlete and Sportsman magazine, the New York Sun, and Sam Willaman as a first-team player on the 1925 All American team. He was inducted into the College Football Hall of Fame in 1963.

Shortly after the final game of the 1925 season, coach Harlow left Colgate to become the head coach at Western Maryland. He was inducted into the College Football Hall of Fame in 1954.

Colgate played its home games at Whitnall Field in Hamilton, New York.

== Schedule ==
Date	Opponent	Site	Result	Attendance	Source
September 26	Canisius	Whitnall Field; Hamilton, NY	W 28–0		
October 3	Clarkson	Whitnall Field; Hamilton, NY	W 60–0		
October 10	St. Bonaventure	Whitnall Field; Hamilton, NY	W 49–0		
October 17	at Lafayette	Franklin Field; Philadelphia, PA	T 7–7		
October 24	at Princeton	Palmer Stadium; Princeton, NJ	W 9–0		
November 1	at Michigan State	College Field; East Lansing, MI	W 14–0		
November 7	Providence	Whitnall Field; Hamilton, NY	W 19–7		
November 14	at Syracuse	Archbold Stadium; Syracuse, NY	W 19–6	30,000	
November 26	at Brown	Andrews Field; Providence, RI	T 14–14		
