= 1925 Rutgers Queensmen football team =

American college football season

1925 Rutgers Queensmen football
- Conference: Independent
- Record: 2–7
- Head coach: John Wallace (2nd season)
- Home stadium: Neilson Field

1925 Eastern college football independents records
| | Conf. | | | Overall |
| Team | W | L | T | W | | L | | T |
|---|---|---|---|---|---|---|---|---|
| No. 1 Dartmouth | | – | | 8 | – | 0 | – | 0 |
| Fordham | | – | | 9 | – | 1 | – | 0 |
| No. 4 Colgate | | – | | 7 | – | 0 | – | 2 |
| No. 10 Pittsburgh | | – | | 8 | – | 1 | – | 0 |
| Syracuse | | – | | 8 | – | 1 | – | 1 |
| No. 11 Lafayette | | – | | 7 | – | 1 | – | 1 |
| Springfield | | – | | 6 | – | 1 | – | 1 |
| Princeton | | – | | 5 | – | 1 | – | 1 |
| Holy Cross | | – | | 8 | – | 2 | – | 0 |
| Penn | | – | | 7 | – | 2 | – | 0 |
| Army | | – | | 7 | – | 2 | – | 0 |
| Boston College | | – | | 6 | – | 2 | – | 0 |
| Cornell | | – | | 6 | – | 2 | – | 0 |
| NYU | | – | | 6 | – | 2 | – | 1 |
| Villanova | | – | | 6 | – | 2 | – | 1 |
| Washington & Jefferson | | – | | 6 | – | 2 | – | 1 |
| Carnegie Tech | | – | | 5 | – | 2 | – | 1 |
| Yale | | – | | 5 | – | 2 | – | 1 |
| Bucknell | | – | | 7 | – | 3 | – | 1 |
| Columbia | | – | | 6 | – | 3 | – | 1 |
| Muhlenberg | | – | | 6 | – | 3 | – | 1 |
| Temple | | – | | 5 | – | 2 | – | 2 |
| Harvard | | – | | 4 | – | 3 | – | 1 |
| Franklin & Marshall | | – | | 5 | – | 4 | – | 0 |
| Brown | | – | | 5 | – | 4 | – | 1 |
| Penn State | | – | | 4 | – | 4 | – | 1 |
| Buffalo | | – | | 3 | – | 4 | – | 1 |
| St. John's | | – | | 3 | – | 4 | – | 0 |
| Lehigh | | – | | 3 | – | 5 | – | 1 |
| Vermont | | – | | 3 | – | 6 | – | 0 |
| CCNY | | – | | 2 | – | 5 | – | 0 |
| Providence | | – | | 2 | – | 7 | – | 0 |
| Rutgers | | – | | 2 | – | 7 | – | 0 |
| Boston University | | – | | 1 | – | 5 | – | 0 |
| Manhattan | | – | | 1 | – | 6 | – | 1 |
| Tufts | | – | | 1 | – | 6 | – | 0 |
| Drexel | | – | | 1 | – | 7 | – | 0 |
Rankings from Dickinson System

The 1925 Rutgers Queensmen football team was an American football team that represented Rutgers University as an independent during the 1925 college football season. In its second season under head coach John Wallace, the team compiled a 2–7 record and was outscored by a total of 146 to 38.

== Schedule ==
| Date | Opponent | Site | Result | Attendance | Source |
|---|---|---|---|---|---|
| September 26 | Alfred | Neilson Field; New Brunswick, NJ | W 19–3 | | |
| October 3 | Villanova | Neilson Field; New Brunswick, NJ | L 0–20 | | |
| October 10 | vs. Maryland | Franklin Field; Philadelphia, PA | L 0–16 | | |
| October 17 | at Cornell | Schoellkopf Field; Ithaca, NY | L 0–41 | | |
| October 24 | Lehigh | Neilson Field; New Brunswick, NJ | L 0–7 | | |
| October 31 | Pennsylvania Military | Neilson Field; New Brunswick, NJ | L 12–13 | | |
| November 7 | at Lafayette | March Field; Easton, PA | L 0–34 | | |
| November 14 | at Holy Cross | Worcester, MA | L 0–6 | | |
| November 21 | NYU | Neilsen Field; New Brunswick, NJ | W 7–6 | 10,000 | |
