= 1925 Boston College Eagles football team =

American college football season

1925 Boston College Eagles football
- Conference: Independent
- Record: 6–2
- Head coach: Frank Cavanaugh (7th season)
- Captain: Jack Donahue
- Home stadium: Braves Field

1925 Eastern college football independents records
| | Conf. | | | Overall |
| Team | W | L | T | W | | L | | T |
|---|---|---|---|---|---|---|---|---|
| No. 1 Dartmouth | | – | | 8 | – | 0 | – | 0 |
| Fordham | | – | | 9 | – | 1 | – | 0 |
| No. 4 Colgate | | – | | 7 | – | 0 | – | 2 |
| No. 10 Pittsburgh | | – | | 8 | – | 1 | – | 0 |
| Syracuse | | – | | 8 | – | 1 | – | 1 |
| No. 11 Lafayette | | – | | 7 | – | 1 | – | 1 |
| Springfield | | – | | 6 | – | 1 | – | 1 |
| Princeton | | – | | 5 | – | 1 | – | 1 |
| Holy Cross | | – | | 8 | – | 2 | – | 0 |
| Penn | | – | | 7 | – | 2 | – | 0 |
| Army | | – | | 7 | – | 2 | – | 0 |
| Boston College | | – | | 6 | – | 2 | – | 0 |
| Cornell | | – | | 6 | – | 2 | – | 0 |
| NYU | | – | | 6 | – | 2 | – | 1 |
| Villanova | | – | | 6 | – | 2 | – | 1 |
| Washington & Jefferson | | – | | 6 | – | 2 | – | 1 |
| Carnegie Tech | | – | | 5 | – | 2 | – | 1 |
| Yale | | – | | 5 | – | 2 | – | 1 |
| Bucknell | | – | | 7 | – | 3 | – | 1 |
| Columbia | | – | | 6 | – | 3 | – | 1 |
| Muhlenberg | | – | | 6 | – | 3 | – | 1 |
| Temple | | – | | 5 | – | 2 | – | 2 |
| Harvard | | – | | 4 | – | 3 | – | 1 |
| Franklin & Marshall | | – | | 5 | – | 4 | – | 0 |
| Brown | | – | | 5 | – | 4 | – | 1 |
| Penn State | | – | | 4 | – | 4 | – | 1 |
| Buffalo | | – | | 3 | – | 4 | – | 1 |
| St. John's | | – | | 3 | – | 4 | – | 0 |
| Lehigh | | – | | 3 | – | 5 | – | 1 |
| Vermont | | – | | 3 | – | 6 | – | 0 |
| CCNY | | – | | 2 | – | 5 | – | 0 |
| Providence | | – | | 2 | – | 7 | – | 0 |
| Rutgers | | – | | 2 | – | 7 | – | 0 |
| Boston University | | – | | 1 | – | 5 | – | 0 |
| Manhattan | | – | | 1 | – | 6 | – | 1 |
| Tufts | | – | | 1 | – | 6 | – | 0 |
| Drexel | | – | | 1 | – | 7 | – | 0 |
Rankings from Dickinson System

The 1925 Boston College Eagles football team was an American football team that represented Boston College as an independent during the 1925 college football season. In its seventh season under head coach Frank Cavanaugh, the team compiled a 6–2 record and outscored its opponents by a total of 154 to 54.

Jack Cronin played at the left halfback position. He later played four years in the National Football League for the Providence Steam Roller. Joe McKenney played at quarterback and later returned as Boston College's head football coach from 1928 to 1934. Jack Donahue was the team captain.

== Schedule ==
| Date | Time | Opponent | Site | Result | Attendance | Source |
|---|---|---|---|---|---|---|
| October 3 | | Catholic University | Braves Field; Boston, MA | W 6–0 | | |
| October 12 | | Haskell | Braves Field; Boston, MA | W 7–6 | | |
| October 17 | 2:00 p.m. | Boston University | Braves Field; Boston, MA (rivalry) | W 51–7 | | |
| October 24 | | Allegheny | Braves Field; Boston, MA | W 14–7 | | |
| October 31 | | Providence College | Braves Field; Boston, MA | W 51–0 | | |
| November 7 | | West Virginia | Braves Field; Boston, MA | L 0–21 | | |
| November 14 | | West Virginia Wesleyan | Braves Field; Boston, MA | L 6–7 | | |
| November 28 | | Holy Cross | Braves Field; Boston, MA (rivalry) | W 17–6 | 47,000 | |
