= 1925 Vermont Green and Gold football team =

American college football season

1925 Vermont Green and Gold football
- Conference: Independent
- Record: 3–6
- Head coach: William McAvoy (1st season)
- Home stadium: Centennial Field

1925 Eastern college football independents records
	Conf.			Overall
Team	W	L	T	W		L		T
No. 1 Dartmouth		–		8	–	0	–	0
Fordham		–		9	–	1	–	0
No. 4 Colgate		–		7	–	0	–	2
No. 10 Pittsburgh		–		8	–	1	–	0
Syracuse		–		8	–	1	–	1
No. 11 Lafayette		–		7	–	1	–	1
Springfield		–		6	–	1	–	1
Princeton		–		5	–	1	–	1
Holy Cross		–		8	–	2	–	0
Penn		–		7	–	2	–	0
Army		–		7	–	2	–	0
Boston College		–		6	–	2	–	0
Cornell		–		6	–	2	–	0
NYU		–		6	–	2	–	1
Villanova		–		6	–	2	–	1
Washington & Jefferson		–		6	–	2	–	1
Carnegie Tech		–		5	–	2	–	1
Yale		–		5	–	2	–	1
Bucknell		–		7	–	3	–	1
Columbia		–		6	–	3	–	1
Muhlenberg		–		6	–	3	–	1
Temple		–		5	–	2	–	2
Harvard		–		4	–	3	–	1
Franklin & Marshall		–		5	–	4	–	0
Brown		–		5	–	4	–	1
Penn State		–		4	–	4	–	1
Buffalo		–		3	–	4	–	1
St. John's		–		3	–	4	–	0
Lehigh		–		3	–	5	–	1
Vermont		–		3	–	6	–	0
CCNY		–		2	–	5	–	0
Providence		–		2	–	7	–	0
Rutgers		–		2	–	7	–	0
Boston University		–		1	–	5	–	0
Manhattan		–		1	–	6	–	1
Tufts		–		1	–	6	–	0
Drexel		–		1	–	7	–	0
Rankings from Dickinson System

The 1925 Vermont Green and Gold football team was an American football team that represented the University of Vermont as an independent during the 1925 college football season. In their first year under head coach William McAvoy, the team compiled a 3–6 record.

== Schedule ==
Date	Time	Opponent	Site	Result	Attendance	Source
September 26		Clarkson	Centennial Field; Burlington, VT	W 7–0		
October 3		at Syracuse	Archbold Stadium; Syracuse, NY	L 0–26	8,000	
October 10		at Dartmouth	Memorial Field; Hanover, NH	L 0–50		
October 17		at Springfield	Pratt Field; Springfield, MA	L 0–6		
October 24		Holy Cross	Centennial Field; Burlington, VT	L 3–47		
October 31		at Norwich	Sabine Field; Northfield, VT	W 3–0		
November 7		at RPI	'86 Field; Troy, NY	L 7–20		
November 14		Middlebury	Centennial Field; Burlington, VT	W 7–6		
November 26	3:00 p.m.	at Saint Louis	St. Louis University Field; St. Louis, MO	L 0–7		
All times are in Eastern time
