= Ed McMillan =

American football player (1903–1974)

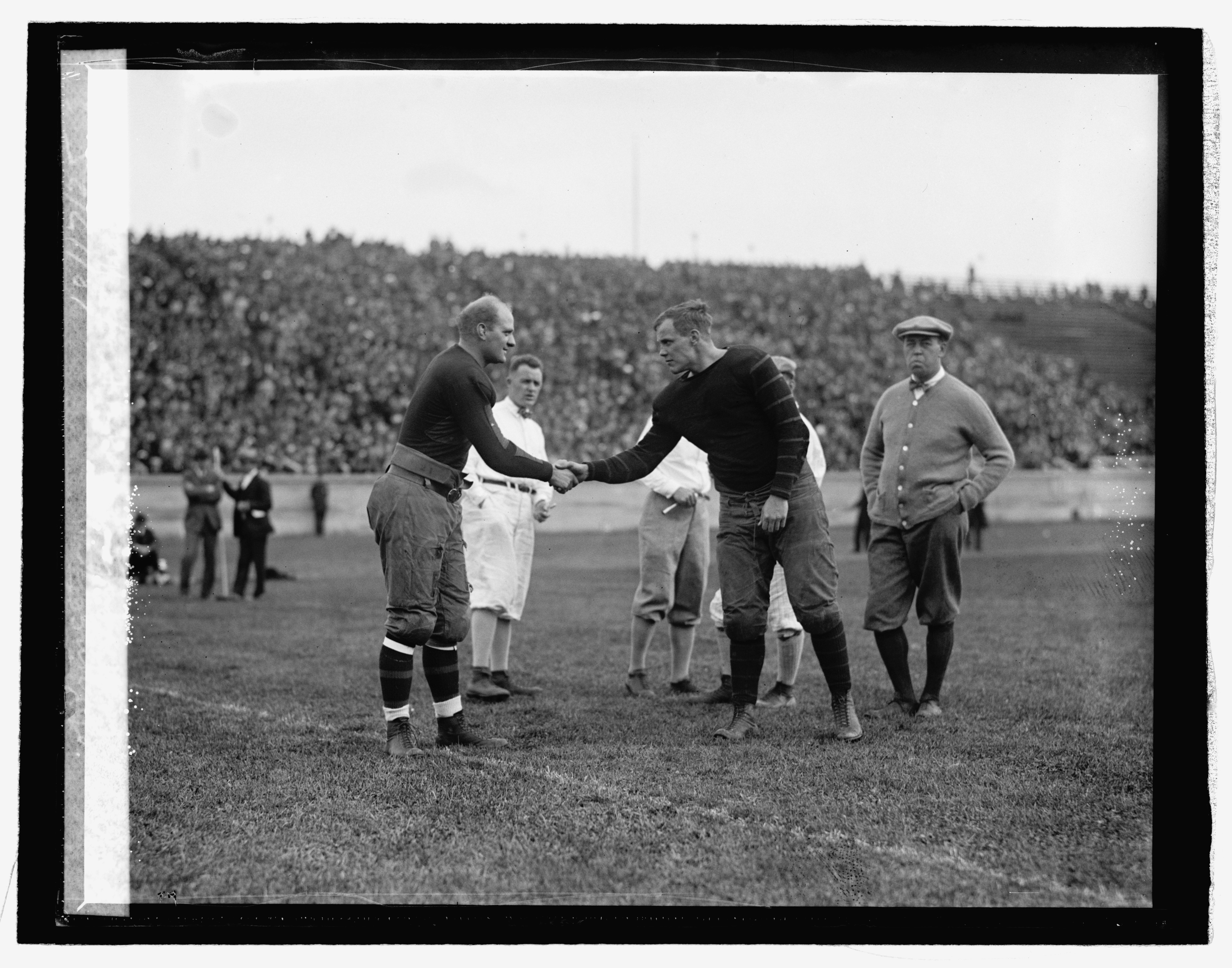

Princeton Tigers
- Position: Center

Personal information
- Born: June 23, 1903; Pennsylvania, U.S.
- Died: November 23, 1974 (aged 71); Paoli, Pennsylvania, U.S.

Career information
- College: Princeton Tigers (1925)

Awards and highlights
- Consensus All-American (1925); First-team All-Eastern (1925)

Edward Louis McMillan Sr. (June 23, 1903 – November 23, 1974) was an American football player.

McMillan attended Princeton University, where he played college football at the center position for the Princeton Tigers. He was captain of the 1929 Princeton team, and he was a consensus first-team selection on the 1925 College Football All-America Team.

After graduating from Princeton, he remained there as an assistant football coach in 1926 and later served as an assistant football coach at Brown University as well. He later worked as an examiner for the Pennsylvania Securities and Exchange Commission.

McMillan was married to Elizabeth Quinn. They had three sons and a daughter. Their son, Edward L. McMillan, Jr., was captain of the Princeton football team in the 1950s.
