= 1925 Holy Cross Crusaders football team =

American college football season

1925 Holy Cross Crusaders football
- Conference: Independent
- Record: 8–2
- Head coach: Cleo A. O'Donnell (7th season)
- Home stadium: Fitton Field

1925 Eastern college football independents records
	Conf.			Overall
Team	W	L	T	W		L		T
No. 1 Dartmouth		–		8	–	0	–	0
Fordham		–		9	–	1	–	0
No. 4 Colgate		–		7	–	0	–	2
No. 10 Pittsburgh		–		8	–	1	–	0
Syracuse		–		8	–	1	–	1
No. 11 Lafayette		–		7	–	1	–	1
Springfield		–		6	–	1	–	1
Princeton		–		5	–	1	–	1
Holy Cross		–		8	–	2	–	0
Penn		–		7	–	2	–	0
Army		–		7	–	2	–	0
Boston College		–		6	–	2	–	0
Cornell		–		6	–	2	–	0
NYU		–		6	–	2	–	1
Villanova		–		6	–	2	–	1
Washington & Jefferson		–		6	–	2	–	1
Carnegie Tech		–		5	–	2	–	1
Yale		–		5	–	2	–	1
Bucknell		–		7	–	3	–	1
Columbia		–		6	–	3	–	1
Muhlenberg		–		6	–	3	–	1
Temple		–		5	–	2	–	2
Harvard		–		4	–	3	–	1
Franklin & Marshall		–		5	–	4	–	0
Brown		–		5	–	4	–	1
Penn State		–		4	–	4	–	1
Buffalo		–		3	–	4	–	1
St. John's		–		3	–	4	–	0
Lehigh		–		3	–	5	–	1
Vermont		–		3	–	6	–	0
CCNY		–		2	–	5	–	0
Providence		–		2	–	7	–	0
Rutgers		–		2	–	7	–	0
Boston University		–		1	–	5	–	0
Manhattan		–		1	–	6	–	1
Tufts		–		1	–	6	–	0
Drexel		–		1	–	7	–	0
Rankings from Dickinson System

The 1925 Holy Cross Crusaders football team was an American football team represented the College of the Holy Cross as an independent during the 1925 college football season. In its seventh season under head coach Cleo A. O'Donnell, the team compiled an 8–2 record and defeated Harvard for the first time in school history.

This was the first team to be named the "Holy Cross Crusaders", as the college adopted its first official team name by a vote of the student body in October 1925. "Crusaders" was the overwhelming favorite in a three-way race, with 143 votes, beating "Chiefs" (17) and "Sagamores" (7). The poll was conducted by The Tomahawk, the student weekly newspaper. Though the Tomahawk noted that this was the college's first official athletic nickname, newspapers had been referring to Holy Cross teams as "the Purple" for years.

The team played its home games at Fitton Field on the college campus in Worcester, Massachusetts.

== Schedule ==
Date	Opponent	Site	Result	Attendance	Source
September 26	Manhattan	Fitton Field; Worcester, MA	W 41–0		
October 3	St. John's	Fitton Field; Worcester, MA	W 9–6		
October 12	Providence	Fitton Field; Worcester, MA	W 22–0		
October 17	at Harvard	Harvard Stadium; Boston, MA	W 7–6	50,000	
October 24	at Vermont	Centennial Field; Burlington, VT	W 47–3		
October 31	Bucknell	Fitton Field; Worcester, MA	W 23–7		
November 7	at Fordham	Polo Grounds; New York, NY	L 0–17	25,000	
November 14	Rutgers	Fitton Field; Worcester, MA	W 6–0		
November 21	Boston University	Fitton Field; Worcester, MA	W 48–7		
November 28	at Boston College	Braves Field; Boston, MA	L 6–17	47,000	
