= 1925 Army Cadets football team =

American college football season

1925 Army Cadets football
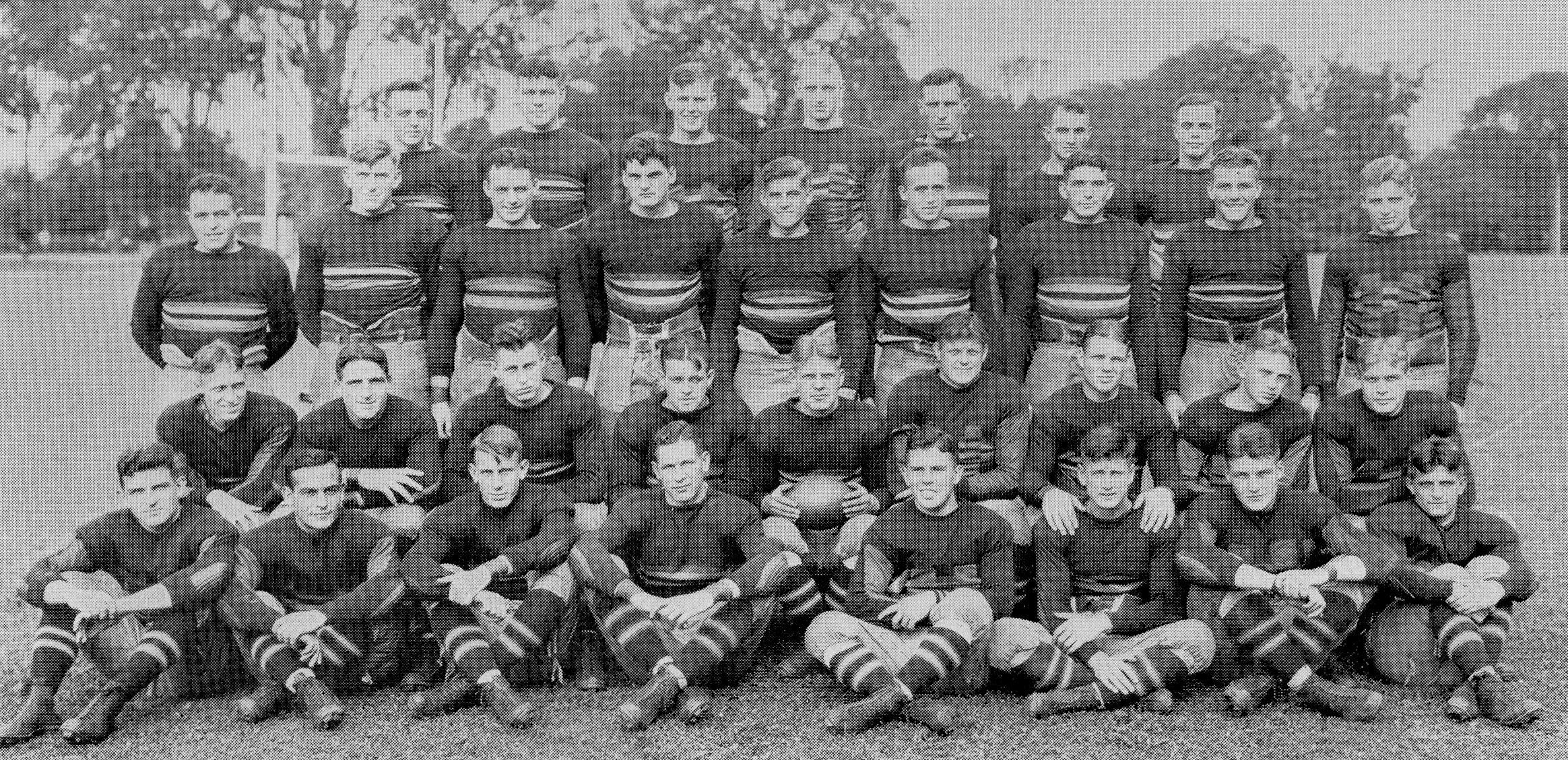
- Conference: Independent
- Record: 7–2
- Head coach: John McEwan (3rd season)
- Captain: Henry Baxter
- Home stadium: Michie Stadium

1925 Eastern college football independents records
	Conf.			Overall
Team	W	L	T	W		L		T
No. 1 Dartmouth		–		8	–	0	–	0
Fordham		–		9	–	1	–	0
No. 4 Colgate		–		7	–	0	–	2
No. 10 Pittsburgh		–		8	–	1	–	0
Syracuse		–		8	–	1	–	1
No. 11 Lafayette		–		7	–	1	–	1
Springfield		–		6	–	1	–	1
Princeton		–		5	–	1	–	1
Holy Cross		–		8	–	2	–	0
Penn		–		7	–	2	–	0
Army		–		7	–	2	–	0
Boston College		–		6	–	2	–	0
Cornell		–		6	–	2	–	0
NYU		–		6	–	2	–	1
Villanova		–		6	–	2	–	1
Washington & Jefferson		–		6	–	2	–	1
Carnegie Tech		–		5	–	2	–	1
Yale		–		5	–	2	–	1
Bucknell		–		7	–	3	–	1
Columbia		–		6	–	3	–	1
Muhlenberg		–		6	–	3	–	1
Temple		–		5	–	2	–	2
Harvard		–		4	–	3	–	1
Franklin & Marshall		–		5	–	4	–	0
Brown		–		5	–	4	–	1
Penn State		–		4	–	4	–	1
Buffalo		–		3	–	4	–	1
St. John's		–		3	–	4	–	0
Lehigh		–		3	–	5	–	1
Vermont		–		3	–	6	–	0
CCNY		–		2	–	5	–	0
Providence		–		2	–	7	–	0
Rutgers		–		2	–	7	–	0
Boston University		–		1	–	5	–	0
Manhattan		–		1	–	6	–	1
Tufts		–		1	–	6	–	0
Drexel		–		1	–	7	–	0
Rankings from Dickinson System

The 1925 Army Cadets football team was an American football team that represented the United States Military Academy as an independent during the 1925 college football season. In its third season under head coach John McEwan, the team compiled a 7–2 record and outscored opponents by a total of 185 to 71.

When an ill Babe Ruth could not lead the Yankees to the World Series in 1925, college football took center stage at Yankee Stadium that fall. The fiercely competitive Army–Notre Dame rivalry game moved there and remained through 1946.

The Army–Navy Game was played on November 28 at the Polo Grounds in New York City, Army won 10–3.

== Schedule ==
Date	Opponent	Site	Result	Attendance	Source
October 3	Detroit	Michie Stadium; West Point, NY	W 31–6		
October 10	Knox (IL)	Michie Stadium; West Point, NY	W 26–7		
October 17	vs. Notre Dame	Yankee Stadium; Bronx, NY (rivalry)	W 27–0	70,000	
October 24	Saint Louis	Michie Stadium; West Point, NY	W 19–0		
October 31	at Yale	Yale Bowl; New Haven, CT	L 7–28	80,000	
November 7	Davis & Elkins	Michie Stadium; West Point, NY	W 14–6		
November 14	at Columbia	Polo Grounds; New York, NY	L 7–21	50,000	
November 21	Ursinus	Michie Stadium; West Point, NY	W 44–0		
November 28	vs. Navy	Polo Grounds; New York, NY (Army–Navy Game)	W 10–3	70,000	
