= 1925 Cornell Big Red football team =

American college football season

1925 Cornell Big Red football
- Conference: Independent
- Record: 6–2
- Head coach: Gil Dobie (6th season)
- Offensive scheme: Single-wing
- Base defense: 6–3–2
- Captain: Frank Kearney
- Home stadium: Schoellkopf Field

1925 Eastern college football independents records
	Conf.			Overall
Team	W	L	T	W		L		T
No. 1 Dartmouth		–		8	–	0	–	0
Fordham		–		9	–	1	–	0
No. 4 Colgate		–		7	–	0	–	2
No. 10 Pittsburgh		–		8	–	1	–	0
Syracuse		–		8	–	1	–	1
No. 11 Lafayette		–		7	–	1	–	1
Springfield		–		6	–	1	–	1
Princeton		–		5	–	1	–	1
Holy Cross		–		8	–	2	–	0
Penn		–		7	–	2	–	0
Army		–		7	–	2	–	0
Boston College		–		6	–	2	–	0
Cornell		–		6	–	2	–	0
NYU		–		6	–	2	–	1
Villanova		–		6	–	2	–	1
Washington & Jefferson		–		6	–	2	–	1
Carnegie Tech		–		5	–	2	–	1
Yale		–		5	–	2	–	1
Bucknell		–		7	–	3	–	1
Columbia		–		6	–	3	–	1
Muhlenberg		–		6	–	3	–	1
Temple		–		5	–	2	–	2
Harvard		–		4	–	3	–	1
Franklin & Marshall		–		5	–	4	–	0
Brown		–		5	–	4	–	1
Penn State		–		4	–	4	–	1
Buffalo		–		3	–	4	–	1
St. John's		–		3	–	4	–	0
Lehigh		–		3	–	5	–	1
Vermont		–		3	–	6	–	0
CCNY		–		2	–	5	–	0
Providence		–		2	–	7	–	0
Rutgers		–		2	–	7	–	0
Boston University		–		1	–	5	–	0
Manhattan		–		1	–	6	–	1
Tufts		–		1	–	6	–	0
Drexel		–		1	–	7	–	0
Rankings from Dickinson System

The 1925 Cornell Big Red football team was an American football team that represented Cornell University during the 1925 college football season. In its sixth season under head coach Gil Dobie, the team compiled a 6–2 record and outscored all opponents by a combined total of 258 to 83. The team played its home games at Schoellkopf Field in Ithaca, New York.

== Schedule ==
Date	Opponent	Site	Result	Attendance	Source
September 26	Susquehanna	Schoellkopf Field; Ithaca, NY	W 80–0		
October 3	Niagara	Schoellkopf Field; Ithaca, NY	W 26–0		
October 10	Williams	Schoellkopf Field; Ithaca, NY	W 48–0		
October 17	Rutgers	Schoellkopf Field; Ithaca, NY	W 41–0		
October 31	at Columbia	Polo Grounds; New York, NY (rivalry)	W 17–14		
November 7	at Dartmouth	Memorial Field; Hanover, NH (rivalry)	L 13–62	15,000	
November 14	Canisius	Schoellkopf Field; Ithaca, NY	W 33–0		
November 26	at Penn	Franklin Field; Philadelphia, PA (rivalry)	L 0–7	71,000	
