= 1925 Columbia Lions football team =

American college football season

1925 Columbia Lions football
- Conference: Independent
- Record: 6–3–1
- Head coach: Charles Crowley (1st season)
- Captain: George Pease
- Home stadium: Baker Field, Polo Grounds

1925 Eastern college football independents records
	Conf.			Overall
Team	W	L	T	W		L		T
No. 1 Dartmouth		–		8	–	0	–	0
Fordham		–		9	–	1	–	0
No. 4 Colgate		–		7	–	0	–	2
No. 10 Pittsburgh		–		8	–	1	–	0
Syracuse		–		8	–	1	–	1
No. 11 Lafayette		–		7	–	1	–	1
Springfield		–		6	–	1	–	1
Princeton		–		5	–	1	–	1
Holy Cross		–		8	–	2	–	0
Penn		–		7	–	2	–	0
Army		–		7	–	2	–	0
Boston College		–		6	–	2	–	0
Cornell		–		6	–	2	–	0
NYU		–		6	–	2	–	1
Villanova		–		6	–	2	–	1
Washington & Jefferson		–		6	–	2	–	1
Carnegie Tech		–		5	–	2	–	1
Yale		–		5	–	2	–	1
Bucknell		–		7	–	3	–	1
Columbia		–		6	–	3	–	1
Muhlenberg		–		6	–	3	–	1
Temple		–		5	–	2	–	2
Harvard		–		4	–	3	–	1
Franklin & Marshall		–		5	–	4	–	0
Brown		–		5	–	4	–	1
Penn State		–		4	–	4	–	1
Buffalo		–		3	–	4	–	1
St. John's		–		3	–	4	–	0
Lehigh		–		3	–	5	–	1
Vermont		–		3	–	6	–	0
CCNY		–		2	–	5	–	0
Providence		–		2	–	7	–	0
Rutgers		–		2	–	7	–	0
Boston University		–		1	–	5	–	0
Manhattan		–		1	–	6	–	1
Tufts		–		1	–	6	–	0
Drexel		–		1	–	7	–	0
Rankings from Dickinson System

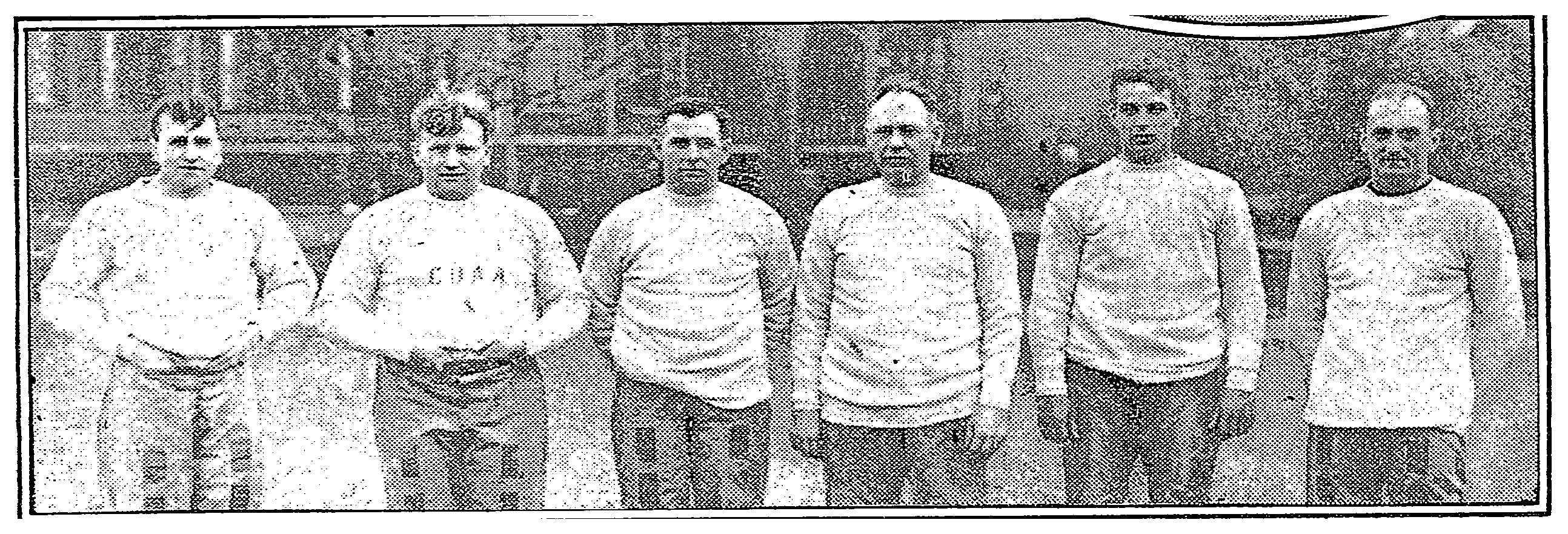
1925 Columbia Lions football coaching staff

The 1925 Columbia Lions football team was an American football team that represented Columbia University as an independent during the 1925 college football season. In its first season under head coach Charles Crowley, the team compiled a 6–3–1 record and outscored opponents 288 to 55, with five shutouts. The team played its home games at Baker Field (seven games) and the Polo Grounds (two games), both located in Upper Manhattan.

== Schedule ==
Date	Opponent	Site	Result	Attendance	Source
September 26	Haverford	Baker Field; New York, NY	W 59–0		
October 3	Johns Hopkins	Baker Field; New York, NY	W 47–0	9,000	
October 10	Wesleyan	Baker Field; New York, NY	W 64–0	3,000	
October 17	at Ohio State	Ohio Stadium; Columbus, OH	L 0–9		
October 24	Williams	Baker Field; New York, NY	W 26–0	7,000	
October 31	Cornell	Polo Grounds; New York, NY (rivalry)	L 14–17		
November 7	NYU	Baker Field; New York, NY	T 6–6	13,000	
November 14	Army	Polo Grounds; New York, NY	W 21–7	50,000	
November 21	Alfred	Baker Field; New York, NY	W 46–0	7,000	
November 26	Syracuse	Polo Grounds; New York, NY	L 5–16	30,000	
