= 1925 Washington & Jefferson Presidents football team =

American college football season

1925 Washington & Jefferson Presidents football
- Conference: Independent
- Record: 6–2–1
- Head coach: David C. Morrow (8th season)
- Home stadium: College Field

1925 Eastern college football independents records
	Conf.			Overall
Team	W	L	T	W		L		T
No. 1 Dartmouth		–		8	–	0	–	0
Fordham		–		9	–	1	–	0
No. 4 Colgate		–		7	–	0	–	2
No. 10 Pittsburgh		–		8	–	1	–	0
Syracuse		–		8	–	1	–	1
No. 11 Lafayette		–		7	–	1	–	1
Springfield		–		6	–	1	–	1
Princeton		–		5	–	1	–	1
Holy Cross		–		8	–	2	–	0
Penn		–		7	–	2	–	0
Army		–		7	–	2	–	0
Boston College		–		6	–	2	–	0
Cornell		–		6	–	2	–	0
NYU		–		6	–	2	–	1
Villanova		–		6	–	2	–	1
Washington & Jefferson		–		6	–	2	–	1
Carnegie Tech		–		5	–	2	–	1
Yale		–		5	–	2	–	1
Bucknell		–		7	–	3	–	1
Columbia		–		6	–	3	–	1
Muhlenberg		–		6	–	3	–	1
Temple		–		5	–	2	–	2
Harvard		–		4	–	3	–	1
Franklin & Marshall		–		5	–	4	–	0
Brown		–		5	–	4	–	1
Penn State		–		4	–	4	–	1
Buffalo		–		3	–	4	–	1
St. John's		–		3	–	4	–	0
Lehigh		–		3	–	5	–	1
Vermont		–		3	–	6	–	0
CCNY		–		2	–	5	–	0
Providence		–		2	–	7	–	0
Rutgers		–		2	–	7	–	0
Boston University		–		1	–	5	–	0
Manhattan		–		1	–	6	–	1
Tufts		–		1	–	6	–	0
Drexel		–		1	–	7	–	0
Rankings from Dickinson System

The 1925 Washington & Jefferson Presidents football team was an American football team that represented Washington & Jefferson College as an independent during the 1925 college football season. In its eighth and final season under head coach David C. Morrow, the team compiled a 6–2–1 record and outscored opponents by a total of 165 to 50. The team played its home games at College Field in Washington, Pennsylvania.

On October 17, 1925, during a game against Carnegie Tech, a large section of the old wooden stands at College Field collapsed 300 to 400 spectators into Chartiers Creek.

== Schedule ==
Date	Opponent	Site	Result	Attendance	Source
September 26	at Geneva	Beaver Falls, PA	W 19–13		
October 3	Marietta	College Field; Washington, PA	W 72–0		
October 10	Waynesburg	College Field; Washington, PA	W 40–6		
October 17	Carnegie Tech	College Field; Washington, PA	T 0–0	12,000	
October 24	vs. Lafayette	Polo Grounds; New York, NY	W 7–6	10,000	
October 31	vs. Bethany (WV)	Wheeling, WV	W 20–0		
November 7	at Pittsburgh	Pitt Stadium; Pittsburgh, PA	L 0–6	30,000	
November 14	at Detroit	University of Detroit Stadium; Detroit, MI	W 7–0		
November 26	at West Virginia	Mountaineer Stadium; Morgantown, WV	L 0–19	23,000	
