= 1925 NYU Violets football team =

American college football season

1925 NYU Violets football
- Conference: Independent
- Record: 6–2–1
- Head coach: Chick Meehan (1st season)
- Home stadium: Ohio Field

1925 Eastern college football independents records
	Conf.			Overall
Team	W	L	T	W		L		T
No. 1 Dartmouth		–		8	–	0	–	0
Fordham		–		9	–	1	–	0
No. 4 Colgate		–		7	–	0	–	2
No. 10 Pittsburgh		–		8	–	1	–	0
Syracuse		–		8	–	1	–	1
No. 11 Lafayette		–		7	–	1	–	1
Springfield		–		6	–	1	–	1
Princeton		–		5	–	1	–	1
Holy Cross		–		8	–	2	–	0
Penn		–		7	–	2	–	0
Army		–		7	–	2	–	0
Boston College		–		6	–	2	–	0
Cornell		–		6	–	2	–	0
NYU		–		6	–	2	–	1
Villanova		–		6	–	2	–	1
Washington & Jefferson		–		6	–	2	–	1
Carnegie Tech		–		5	–	2	–	1
Yale		–		5	–	2	–	1
Bucknell		–		7	–	3	–	1
Columbia		–		6	–	3	–	1
Muhlenberg		–		6	–	3	–	1
Temple		–		5	–	2	–	2
Harvard		–		4	–	3	–	1
Franklin & Marshall		–		5	–	4	–	0
Brown		–		5	–	4	–	1
Penn State		–		4	–	4	–	1
Buffalo		–		3	–	4	–	1
St. John's		–		3	–	4	–	0
Lehigh		–		3	–	5	–	1
Vermont		–		3	–	6	–	0
CCNY		–		2	–	5	–	0
Providence		–		2	–	7	–	0
Rutgers		–		2	–	7	–	0
Boston University		–		1	–	5	–	0
Manhattan		–		1	–	6	–	1
Tufts		–		1	–	6	–	0
Drexel		–		1	–	7	–	0
Rankings from Dickinson System

The 1925 NYU Violets football team was an American football team that represented New York University (NYU) as an independent during the 1925 college football season. In its first season under head coach Chick Meehan, the team compiled a 6–2–1 record.

Meehan was hired as NYU's head coach in January 1925. He had been the head coach at Syracuse the prior five seasons. In early August, Meehan personally wrote to 50 men in various parts of the country asking them to join him for football training at Fort Slocum on the western end of Long Island. Meehan's reputation proved to be a magnet in attracting football talent to NYU.

Fullback Frank Briante starred on offense, scored 60 points, and was selected at the end of the season to be captain of the 1926 team. He later played two years in the National Football League.

The team played its home games at Ohio Field and one neutral-field game at Yankee Stadium.

== Schedule ==
Date	Opponent	Site	Result	Attendance	Source
September 26	Niagara	Ohio Field; Bronx, NY	W 14–0	10,000	
October 3	Connecticut	Ohio Field; Bronx, NY	W 23–0	8,000	
October 10	Union (NY)	Ohio Field; Bronx, NY	W 12–3		
October 17	CCNY	Ohio Field; Bronx, NY	W 41–0	10,000	
October 24	Middlebury	Ohio Field; Bronx, NY	W 33–0	> 8,000	
October 31	vs. Fordham	Yankee Stadium; Bronx, NY	L 6–26	> 15,000	
November 7	at Columbia	Baker Field; New York, NY	T 6–6	13,000	
November 14	Trinity (CT)	Ohio Field; Bronx, NY	W 27–3		
November 21	at Rutgers	Neilson Field; New Brunswick, NJ	L 6–7	10,000	

== Personnel ==
=== Players ===
- Herbert Blum, back
- Frank Briante, fullback
- Jack Connor
- James Fay
- Steve Holden, back and punter
- J. Francis Kelly, end
- Klein
- Robert Lincoln
- John O'Neil, captain and quarterback
- Charlie Rosell
- Ephraim Sehres, back
- Dave Skudin, guard
- Ralph White, guard

=== Coaches ===
- Chick Meehan, head coach
- Joe Schwarzer, assistant coach
- Bill McCarthy, assistant coach
- Al Nixon, graduate manager
- Emil Von Elling, trainer
- Lou Brown, varsity rubber
