= 1925 Dartmouth Indians football team =

American college football season

1925 Dartmouth Indians football
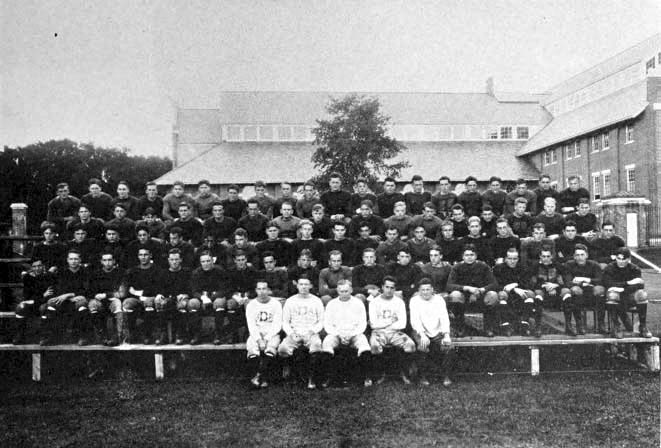

National champion (Dickinson, Davis)
- Conference: Independent
- Record: 8–0
- Head coach: Jesse Hawley (3rd season)
- Captain: Nathan Parker
- Home stadium: Memorial Field

Uniform
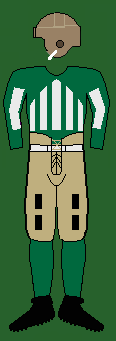

1925 Eastern college football independents records
	Conf.			Overall
Team	W	L	T	W		L		T
No. 1 Dartmouth		–		8	–	0	–	0
Fordham		–		9	–	1	–	0
No. 4 Colgate		–		7	–	0	–	2
No. 10 Pittsburgh		–		8	–	1	–	0
Syracuse		–		8	–	1	–	1
No. 11 Lafayette		–		7	–	1	–	1
Springfield		–		6	–	1	–	1
Princeton		–		5	–	1	–	1
Holy Cross		–		8	–	2	–	0
Penn		–		7	–	2	–	0
Army		–		7	–	2	–	0
Boston College		–		6	–	2	–	0
Cornell		–		6	–	2	–	0
NYU		–		6	–	2	–	1
Villanova		–		6	–	2	–	1
Washington & Jefferson		–		6	–	2	–	1
Carnegie Tech		–		5	–	2	–	1
Yale		–		5	–	2	–	1
Bucknell		–		7	–	3	–	1
Columbia		–		6	–	3	–	1
Muhlenberg		–		6	–	3	–	1
Temple		–		5	–	2	–	2
Harvard		–		4	–	3	–	1
Franklin & Marshall		–		5	–	4	–	0
Brown		–		5	–	4	–	1
Penn State		–		4	–	4	–	1
Buffalo		–		3	–	4	–	1
St. John's		–		3	–	4	–	0
Lehigh		–		3	–	5	–	1
Vermont		–		3	–	6	–	0
CCNY		–		2	–	5	–	0
Providence		–		2	–	7	–	0
Rutgers		–		2	–	7	–	0
Boston University		–		1	–	5	–	0
Manhattan		–		1	–	6	–	1
Tufts		–		1	–	6	–	0
Drexel		–		1	–	7	–	0
Rankings from Dickinson System

The 1925 Dartmouth Indians football team was an American football team that represented Dartmouth College as an independent during the 1925 college football season. In its third season under head coach Jesse Hawley, the team compiled an 8–0 record, shut out five of eight opponents, and outscored all opponents by a total of 340 to 29. The team was designated as 1925 national champions by the Dickinson System and were awarded the Rissman Trophy after its creation the next year. They were also retroactively named champions by Parke H. Davis in the 1934 edition of Spalding's Foot Ball Guide.

Dartmouth's 1925 season was part of a 22-game unbeaten streak that began in November 1923 and continued until October 1926.

Andy Oberlander passed for 14 touchdowns and ran for 12. Dartmouth defeated Harvard, 32–9, its best victory to date over the Crimson. In a 62–13 victory over Cornell, Oberlander had 477 yards in total offense, including six touchdown passes, a Dartmouth record which still stands. He was responsible for some 500 yards of total offense. Cornell coach Gil Dobie responded "We won the game 13–0, passing is not football." The season closed with a 33–7 victory over defending Big Ten champion Chicago. Oberlander threw three touchdowns.

== Schedule ==
Date	Opponent	Site	Result	Attendance	Source
September 26	Norwich	Memorial Field; Hanover, NH	W 59–0		
October 3	Hobart	Memorial Field; Hanover, NH	W 34–0		
October 10	Vermont	Memorial Field; Hanover, NH	W 50–0		
October 17	Maine	Memorial Field; Hanover, NH	W 56–0		
October 24	at Harvard	Harvard Stadium; Boston, MA (rivalry)	W 32–9	53,000	
October 31	at Brown	Brown Stadium; Providence, RI	W 14–0		
November 7	Cornell	Memorial Field; Hanover, NH (rivalry)	W 62–13	15,000	
November 14	at Chicago	Stagg Field; Chicago, IL	W 33–7	34,000	

== Roster ==
The primary players at each position were:

=== Line ===
Player	Pos.	Hometown	Prep school	Height	Weight	Age	Class
Josh Davis	C		Exeter (NH)	5 ft 10 in (1.78 m)	183 lb (83 kg)		1927
Carl Diehl	LG	Chicago, IL	Parker (IL)	6 ft 0 1/4 in (1.835 m)	205 lb (93 kg)	21	1926
Charles Hardy	LT		Exeter (NH)	6 ft 2 in (1.88 m)	193 lb (88 kg)		1927
Nathan Parker	RT	Allegheny Township, PA	Bellevue (PA)	6 ft 0 in (1.83 m)	192 lb (87 kg)	17	1926
Henry Sage	RE	Easton, PA		5 ft 8 in (1.73 m)	162 lb (73 kg)	21	1927
Arthur Smith	RG	Minneapolis, MN	West (MN)	6 ft 0 in (1.83 m)	190 lb (86 kg)		1926
George Tully	LE	Orange, NJ	East Orange (NJ)	5 ft 10 in (1.78 m)	175 lb (79 kg)	21	1926

=== Backfield ===
Player	Pos.	Hometown	Prep school	Height	Weight	Age	Class
Newman Horton	FB	Peekskill, NY	Drum Hill (NY)	5 ft 10 in (1.78 m)	186 lb (84 kg)		1927
Myles Lane	LHB	Melrose, MA	Melrose (MA)	5 ft 11 in (1.80 m)	175 lb (79 kg)	22	1928
Bob MacPhail	QB	Somerville, MA	Exeter (NH)	6 ft 0 in (1.83 m)	181 lb (82 kg)		1928
Andy Oberlander	RHB	Everett, MA	Everett (MA)	5 ft 11 1/2 in (1.816 m)	197 lb (89 kg)	20	1926
