= 1925 CCNY Lavender football team =

American college football season

1925 CCNY Lavender football
- Conference: Independent
- Record: 2–5
- Head coach: Harold J. Parker (2nd season)

1925 Eastern college football independents records
	Conf.			Overall
Team	W	L	T	W		L		T
No. 1 Dartmouth		–		8	–	0	–	0
Fordham		–		9	–	1	–	0
No. 4 Colgate		–		7	–	0	–	2
No. 10 Pittsburgh		–		8	–	1	–	0
Syracuse		–		8	–	1	–	1
No. 11 Lafayette		–		7	–	1	–	1
Springfield		–		6	–	1	–	1
Princeton		–		5	–	1	–	1
Holy Cross		–		8	–	2	–	0
Penn		–		7	–	2	–	0
Army		–		7	–	2	–	0
Boston College		–		6	–	2	–	0
Cornell		–		6	–	2	–	0
NYU		–		6	–	2	–	1
Villanova		–		6	–	2	–	1
Washington & Jefferson		–		6	–	2	–	1
Carnegie Tech		–		5	–	2	–	1
Yale		–		5	–	2	–	1
Bucknell		–		7	–	3	–	1
Columbia		–		6	–	3	–	1
Muhlenberg		–		6	–	3	–	1
Temple		–		5	–	2	–	2
Harvard		–		4	–	3	–	1
Franklin & Marshall		–		5	–	4	–	0
Brown		–		5	–	4	–	1
Penn State		–		4	–	4	–	1
Buffalo		–		3	–	4	–	1
St. John's		–		3	–	4	–	0
Lehigh		–		3	–	5	–	1
Vermont		–		3	–	6	–	0
CCNY		–		2	–	5	–	0
Providence		–		2	–	7	–	0
Rutgers		–		2	–	7	–	0
Boston University		–		1	–	5	–	0
Manhattan		–		1	–	6	–	1
Tufts		–		1	–	6	–	0
Drexel		–		1	–	7	–	0
Rankings from Dickinson System

The 1925 CCNY Lavender football team was an American football team that represented the City College of New York (CCNY) as an independent during the 1925 college football season. In its second season under head coach Harold J. Parker, CCNY compiled a 2–5 record, was shut out by five of seven opponents, and was outscored by all opponents by a total of 171 to 28. The team played its home games at Lewisohn Stadium in New York City.

== Schedule ==
Date	Opponent	Site	Result	Attendance	Source
October 3	New York Aggies	Lewisohn Stadium; New York, NY	W 15–0		
October 10	at St. Lawrence	Canton, NY	L 0–20		
October 17	at NYU	Ohio Field; New York, NY	L 0–41	10,000	
October 24	at Rhode Island State	Kingston, RI	L 0–12		
October 31	Hamilton	Lewisohn Stadium; New York, NY	L 0–12	5,000	
November 7	Manhattan	Lewisohn Stadium; New York, NY	W 13–10		
November 14	at Fordham	Fordham Field; New York, NY	L 0–76		
