= 1925 Franklin & Marshall Nevonians football team =

American college football season

1925 Franklin & Marshall Nevonians football
- Conference: Independent
- Record: 5–4
- Head coach: Charles Mayser (2nd season)
- Captain: Paul Kunkel
- Home stadium: Williamson Field

1925 Eastern college football independents records
| | Conf. | | | Overall |
| Team | W | L | T | W | | L | | T |
|---|---|---|---|---|---|---|---|---|
| No. 1 Dartmouth | | – | | 8 | – | 0 | – | 0 |
| Fordham | | – | | 9 | – | 1 | – | 0 |
| No. 4 Colgate | | – | | 7 | – | 0 | – | 2 |
| No. 10 Pittsburgh | | – | | 8 | – | 1 | – | 0 |
| Syracuse | | – | | 8 | – | 1 | – | 1 |
| No. 11 Lafayette | | – | | 7 | – | 1 | – | 1 |
| Springfield | | – | | 6 | – | 1 | – | 1 |
| Princeton | | – | | 5 | – | 1 | – | 1 |
| Holy Cross | | – | | 8 | – | 2 | – | 0 |
| Penn | | – | | 7 | – | 2 | – | 0 |
| Army | | – | | 7 | – | 2 | – | 0 |
| Boston College | | – | | 6 | – | 2 | – | 0 |
| Cornell | | – | | 6 | – | 2 | – | 0 |
| NYU | | – | | 6 | – | 2 | – | 1 |
| Villanova | | – | | 6 | – | 2 | – | 1 |
| Washington & Jefferson | | – | | 6 | – | 2 | – | 1 |
| Carnegie Tech | | – | | 5 | – | 2 | – | 1 |
| Yale | | – | | 5 | – | 2 | – | 1 |
| Bucknell | | – | | 7 | – | 3 | – | 1 |
| Columbia | | – | | 6 | – | 3 | – | 1 |
| Muhlenberg | | – | | 6 | – | 3 | – | 1 |
| Temple | | – | | 5 | – | 2 | – | 2 |
| Harvard | | – | | 4 | – | 3 | – | 1 |
| Franklin & Marshall | | – | | 5 | – | 4 | – | 0 |
| Brown | | – | | 5 | – | 4 | – | 1 |
| Penn State | | – | | 4 | – | 4 | – | 1 |
| Buffalo | | – | | 3 | – | 4 | – | 1 |
| St. John's | | – | | 3 | – | 4 | – | 0 |
| Lehigh | | – | | 3 | – | 5 | – | 1 |
| Vermont | | – | | 3 | – | 6 | – | 0 |
| CCNY | | – | | 2 | – | 5 | – | 0 |
| Providence | | – | | 2 | – | 7 | – | 0 |
| Rutgers | | – | | 2 | – | 7 | – | 0 |
| Boston University | | – | | 1 | – | 5 | – | 0 |
| Manhattan | | – | | 1 | – | 6 | – | 1 |
| Tufts | | – | | 1 | – | 6 | – | 0 |
| Drexel | | – | | 1 | – | 7 | – | 0 |
Rankings from Dickinson System

The 1925 Franklin & Marshall Nevonians football team was an American football team that represented Franklin & Marshall College during the 1925 college football season. In its second season under head coach Charles Mayser, the team compiled a 5–4 record. The team played its home games at Williamson Field in Lancaster, Pennsylvania.

== Schedule ==
| Date | Opponent | Site | Result | Source |
|---|---|---|---|---|
| September 26 | Albright | Williamson Field; Lancaster, PA | W 15–0 | |
| October 3 | at Penn State | New Beaver Field; State College, PA | L 0–13 | |
| October 10 | Saint John's Military Academy (MD) | Williamson Field; Lancaster, PA | W 26–6 | |
| October 17 | Dickinson | Williamson Field; Lancaster, PA (rivalry) | L 0–7 | |
| October 24 | at Swarthmore | Swarthmore, PA (rivalry) | W 13–2 | |
| October 31 | Haverford | Williamson Field; Lancaster, PA | W 7–6 | |
| November 7 | at Muhlenberg | Allentown, PA | L 7–38 | |
| November 14 | Ursinus | Williamson Field; Lancaster, PA | W 20–0 | |
| November 26 | Gettysburg | Williamson Field; Lancaster, PA (rivalry) | L 0–3 | |
