= 1925 Boston University Terriers football team =

American college football season

1925 Boston University Terriers football
- Conference: Independent
- Record: 1–5
- Head coach: Charles Whelan (5th season)
- Home stadium: Fenway Park

1925 Eastern college football independents records
	Conf.			Overall
Team	W	L	T	W		L		T
No. 1 Dartmouth		–		8	–	0	–	0
Fordham		–		9	–	1	–	0
No. 4 Colgate		–		7	–	0	–	2
No. 10 Pittsburgh		–		8	–	1	–	0
Syracuse		–		8	–	1	–	1
No. 11 Lafayette		–		7	–	1	–	1
Springfield		–		6	–	1	–	1
Princeton		–		5	–	1	–	1
Holy Cross		–		8	–	2	–	0
Penn		–		7	–	2	–	0
Army		–		7	–	2	–	0
Boston College		–		6	–	2	–	0
Cornell		–		6	–	2	–	0
NYU		–		6	–	2	–	1
Villanova		–		6	–	2	–	1
Washington & Jefferson		–		6	–	2	–	1
Carnegie Tech		–		5	–	2	–	1
Yale		–		5	–	2	–	1
Bucknell		–		7	–	3	–	1
Columbia		–		6	–	3	–	1
Muhlenberg		–		6	–	3	–	1
Temple		–		5	–	2	–	2
Harvard		–		4	–	3	–	1
Franklin & Marshall		–		5	–	4	–	0
Brown		–		5	–	4	–	1
Penn State		–		4	–	4	–	1
Buffalo		–		3	–	4	–	1
St. John's		–		3	–	4	–	0
Lehigh		–		3	–	5	–	1
Vermont		–		3	–	6	–	0
CCNY		–		2	–	5	–	0
Providence		–		2	–	7	–	0
Rutgers		–		2	–	7	–	0
Boston University		–		1	–	5	–	0
Manhattan		–		1	–	6	–	1
Tufts		–		1	–	6	–	0
Drexel		–		1	–	7	–	0
Rankings from Dickinson System

The 1925 Boston University Terriers football team was an American football team that represented Boston University as an independent during the 1925 college football season. Led by fifth-year head coach Charles Whelan, the team compiled a 1–5 record and was outscored by a total of 181 to 34.

== Schedule ==
Date	Time	Opponent	Site	Result	Source
October 10		at St. John's	Ebbets Field; Brooklyn, NY	L 0–14	
October 17	2:00 p.m.	at Boston College	Braves Field; Boston, MA (rivalry)	L 7–51	
October 31		at Springfield	Springfield, MA	L 0–20	
November 7		at Brown	Brown Stadium; Providence, RI	L 6–42	
November 14	2:00 p.m.	Providence College	Fenway Park; Boston, MA	W 14–6	
November 21		at Holy Cross	Fitton Field; Worcester, MA	L 7–48	
All times are in Eastern time
