= 1925 Penn State Nittany Lions football team =

American college football season

1925 Penn State Nittany Lions football
- Conference: Independent
- Record: 4–4–1
- Head coach: Hugo Bezdek (8th season)
- Captain: Bas Gray
- Home stadium: New Beaver Field

1925 Eastern college football independents records
	Conf.			Overall
Team	W	L	T	W		L		T
No. 1 Dartmouth		–		8	–	0	–	0
Fordham		–		9	–	1	–	0
No. 4 Colgate		–		7	–	0	–	2
No. 10 Pittsburgh		–		8	–	1	–	0
Syracuse		–		8	–	1	–	1
No. 11 Lafayette		–		7	–	1	–	1
Springfield		–		6	–	1	–	1
Princeton		–		5	–	1	–	1
Holy Cross		–		8	–	2	–	0
Penn		–		7	–	2	–	0
Army		–		7	–	2	–	0
Boston College		–		6	–	2	–	0
Cornell		–		6	–	2	–	0
NYU		–		6	–	2	–	1
Villanova		–		6	–	2	–	1
Washington & Jefferson		–		6	–	2	–	1
Carnegie Tech		–		5	–	2	–	1
Yale		–		5	–	2	–	1
Bucknell		–		7	–	3	–	1
Columbia		–		6	–	3	–	1
Muhlenberg		–		6	–	3	–	1
Temple		–		5	–	2	–	2
Harvard		–		4	–	3	–	1
Franklin & Marshall		–		5	–	4	–	0
Brown		–		5	–	4	–	1
Penn State		–		4	–	4	–	1
Buffalo		–		3	–	4	–	1
St. John's		–		3	–	4	–	0
Lehigh		–		3	–	5	–	1
Vermont		–		3	–	6	–	0
CCNY		–		2	–	5	–	0
Providence		–		2	–	7	–	0
Rutgers		–		2	–	7	–	0
Boston University		–		1	–	5	–	0
Manhattan		–		1	–	6	–	1
Tufts		–		1	–	6	–	0
Drexel		–		1	–	7	–	0
Rankings from Dickinson System

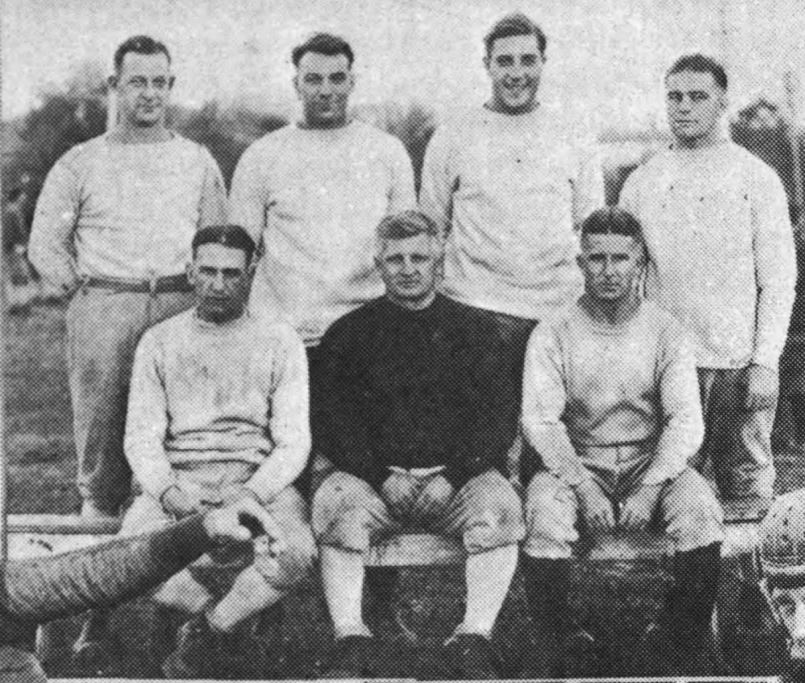
The coaching staff for the 1925 Penn State Nittany Lions football team. From left to right, top to bottom, they are: Flock, Bayer, Prevost, Houck, Killinger, Bezdek, and Herman.

The 1925 Penn State Nittany Lions football team was an American football team that represented Pennsylvania State College as an independent during the 1925 college football season. In its eighth season under head coach Hugo Bezdek, the team compiled a 4–4–1 record and outscored opponents by a total of 67 to 66. The team played its home games at New Beaver Field in State College, Pennsylvania.

== Schedule ==
Date	Opponent	Site	Result	Attendance	Source
September 26	Lebanon Valley	New Beaver Field; State College, PA	W 14–0	3,500	
October 3	Franklin & Marshall	New Beaver Field; State College, PA	W 13–0	3,500	
October 10	vs. Georgia Tech	Yankee Stadium; Bronx, NY	L 7–16	10,000	
October 17	Marietta	New Beaver Field; State College, PA	W 13–0	3,500	
October 24	Michigan State	New Beaver Field; State College, PA (rivalry)	W 13–6	4,000	
October 31	at Syracuse	Archbold Stadium; Syracuse, NY (rivalry)	L 0–7	20,000	
November 7	Notre Dame^{†}	New Beaver Field; State College, PA (rivalry)	T 0–0	20,000	
November 14	at West Virginia	Mountaineer Stadium; Morgantown, WV (rivalry)	L 0–14	18,000	
November 26	at Pittsburgh	Pitt Stadium; Pittsburgh, PA (rivalry)	L 7–23	50,000	
^{†}Homecoming
