= 1925 Temple Owls football team =

American college football season

1925 Temple Owls football
- Conference: Independent
- Record: 5–2–2
- Head coach: Heinie Miller (1st season)
- Captain: James Gilliand

1925 Eastern college football independents records
	Conf.			Overall
Team	W	L	T	W		L		T
No. 1 Dartmouth		–		8	–	0	–	0
Fordham		–		9	–	1	–	0
No. 4 Colgate		–		7	–	0	–	2
No. 10 Pittsburgh		–		8	–	1	–	0
Syracuse		–		8	–	1	–	1
No. 11 Lafayette		–		7	–	1	–	1
Springfield		–		6	–	1	–	1
Princeton		–		5	–	1	–	1
Holy Cross		–		8	–	2	–	0
Penn		–		7	–	2	–	0
Army		–		7	–	2	–	0
Boston College		–		6	–	2	–	0
Cornell		–		6	–	2	–	0
NYU		–		6	–	2	–	1
Villanova		–		6	–	2	–	1
Washington & Jefferson		–		6	–	2	–	1
Carnegie Tech		–		5	–	2	–	1
Yale		–		5	–	2	–	1
Bucknell		–		7	–	3	–	1
Columbia		–		6	–	3	–	1
Muhlenberg		–		6	–	3	–	1
Temple		–		5	–	2	–	2
Harvard		–		4	–	3	–	1
Franklin & Marshall		–		5	–	4	–	0
Brown		–		5	–	4	–	1
Penn State		–		4	–	4	–	1
Buffalo		–		3	–	4	–	1
St. John's		–		3	–	4	–	0
Lehigh		–		3	–	5	–	1
Vermont		–		3	–	6	–	0
CCNY		–		2	–	5	–	0
Providence		–		2	–	7	–	0
Rutgers		–		2	–	7	–	0
Boston University		–		1	–	5	–	0
Manhattan		–		1	–	6	–	1
Tufts		–		1	–	6	–	0
Drexel		–		1	–	7	–	0
Rankings from Dickinson System

The 1925 Temple Owls football team was an American football team that represented Temple University as an independent during the 1925 college football season. In its first season under head coach Heinie Miller, the team compiled a 5–2–2 record. Center James Gilliand was the team captain.

== Schedule ==
Date	Opponent	Site	Result	Attendance	Source
October 3	Upsala	North East High School Field; Philadelphia, PA	W 19–0		
October 10	at Schuylkill	Schuykill Stadium; Reading, PA	W 3–0	> 5,000	
October 17	at St. John's (MD)		W 18–0		
October 24	at Pennsylvania Military	Chester, PA	L 0–13		
October 31	Lebanon Valley	Pennsylvania Railroad YMCA Field	T 0–0	10,000	
November 7	at George Washington	Central High School Stadium; Washington, DC	T 0–0		
November 14	Saint Joseph's	Phillies Ball Park; Philadelphia, PA	W 32–0		
November 21	at Susquehanna	Selinsgrove, PA	W 26–10		
November 26	at Schuylkill	Schuylkill Stadium; Reading, PA	L 6–16	2,600	
