= 1925 Villanova Wildcats football team =

American college football season

1925 Villanova Wildcats football
- Conference: Independent
- Record: 6–2–1
- Head coach: Harry Stuhldreher (1st season)
- Captain: James Callaghan
- Home stadium: Shibe Park

1925 Eastern college football independents records
	Conf.			Overall
Team	W	L	T	W		L		T
No. 1 Dartmouth		–		8	–	0	–	0
Fordham		–		9	–	1	–	0
No. 4 Colgate		–		7	–	0	–	2
No. 10 Pittsburgh		–		8	–	1	–	0
Syracuse		–		8	–	1	–	1
No. 11 Lafayette		–		7	–	1	–	1
Springfield		–		6	–	1	–	1
Princeton		–		5	–	1	–	1
Holy Cross		–		8	–	2	–	0
Penn		–		7	–	2	–	0
Army		–		7	–	2	–	0
Boston College		–		6	–	2	–	0
Cornell		–		6	–	2	–	0
NYU		–		6	–	2	–	1
Villanova		–		6	–	2	–	1
Washington & Jefferson		–		6	–	2	–	1
Carnegie Tech		–		5	–	2	–	1
Yale		–		5	–	2	–	1
Bucknell		–		7	–	3	–	1
Columbia		–		6	–	3	–	1
Muhlenberg		–		6	–	3	–	1
Temple		–		5	–	2	–	2
Harvard		–		4	–	3	–	1
Franklin & Marshall		–		5	–	4	–	0
Brown		–		5	–	4	–	1
Penn State		–		4	–	4	–	1
Buffalo		–		3	–	4	–	1
St. John's		–		3	–	4	–	0
Lehigh		–		3	–	5	–	1
Vermont		–		3	–	6	–	0
CCNY		–		2	–	5	–	0
Providence		–		2	–	7	–	0
Rutgers		–		2	–	7	–	0
Boston University		–		1	–	5	–	0
Manhattan		–		1	–	6	–	1
Tufts		–		1	–	6	–	0
Drexel		–		1	–	7	–	0
Rankings from Dickinson System

The 1925 Villanova Wildcats football team was an American football team that represented Villanova University as an independent during the 1925 college football season. The team compiled a 6–2–1 record and outscored opponents by a total of 107 to 40. In March 1925, the school hired Harry Stuhldreher as its new head coach. Stuhldreher was the quarterback at Notre Dame from 1922 to 1924, a three-time All-American and member of the legendary "Four Horsemen" backfield. James Callaghan was the team captain. The team played its three home games at Shibe Park in Philadelphia.

== Schedule ==
Date	Opponent	Site	Result	Attendance	Source
September 26	at Loyola (MD)	Baltimore Stadium; Baltimore, MD	W 33–0		
October 3	at Rutgers	Neilson Field; New Brunswick, NJ	W 20–0		
October 10	Dickinson	Shibe Park; Philadelphia, PA	L 2–13		
October 17	at Catholic University	Brookland Stadium; Washington, DC	L 0–9		
October 24	Lebanon Valley	Shibe Park; Philadelphia, PA	T 6–6		
October 31	at St. John's	Ebbets Field; New York, NY	W 7–0		
November 7	Saint Joseph's	Shibe Park; Philadelphia, PA	W 10–3		
November 14	at Lehigh	Taylor Stadium; Bethlehem, PA	W 6–0		
November 26	at Muhlenberg	Muhlenberg Field; Allentown, PA	W 23–9	15,000	
