= 1925 Bucknell Bison football team =

American college football season

1925 Bucknell Bison football
- Conference: Independent
- Record: 7–3–1
- Head coach: Charley Moran (2nd season)
- Home stadium: Bucknell University Memorial Stadium

1925 Eastern college football independents records
| | Conf. | | | Overall |
| Team | W | L | T | W | | L | | T |
|---|---|---|---|---|---|---|---|---|
| No. 1 Dartmouth | | – | | 8 | – | 0 | – | 0 |
| Fordham | | – | | 9 | – | 1 | – | 0 |
| No. 4 Colgate | | – | | 7 | – | 0 | – | 2 |
| No. 10 Pittsburgh | | – | | 8 | – | 1 | – | 0 |
| Syracuse | | – | | 8 | – | 1 | – | 1 |
| No. 11 Lafayette | | – | | 7 | – | 1 | – | 1 |
| Springfield | | – | | 6 | – | 1 | – | 1 |
| Princeton | | – | | 5 | – | 1 | – | 1 |
| Holy Cross | | – | | 8 | – | 2 | – | 0 |
| Penn | | – | | 7 | – | 2 | – | 0 |
| Army | | – | | 7 | – | 2 | – | 0 |
| Boston College | | – | | 6 | – | 2 | – | 0 |
| Cornell | | – | | 6 | – | 2 | – | 0 |
| NYU | | – | | 6 | – | 2 | – | 1 |
| Villanova | | – | | 6 | – | 2 | – | 1 |
| Washington & Jefferson | | – | | 6 | – | 2 | – | 1 |
| Carnegie Tech | | – | | 5 | – | 2 | – | 1 |
| Yale | | – | | 5 | – | 2 | – | 1 |
| Bucknell | | – | | 7 | – | 3 | – | 1 |
| Columbia | | – | | 6 | – | 3 | – | 1 |
| Muhlenberg | | – | | 6 | – | 3 | – | 1 |
| Temple | | – | | 5 | – | 2 | – | 2 |
| Harvard | | – | | 4 | – | 3 | – | 1 |
| Franklin & Marshall | | – | | 5 | – | 4 | – | 0 |
| Brown | | – | | 5 | – | 4 | – | 1 |
| Penn State | | – | | 4 | – | 4 | – | 1 |
| Buffalo | | – | | 3 | – | 4 | – | 1 |
| St. John's | | – | | 3 | – | 4 | – | 0 |
| Lehigh | | – | | 3 | – | 5 | – | 1 |
| Vermont | | – | | 3 | – | 6 | – | 0 |
| CCNY | | – | | 2 | – | 5 | – | 0 |
| Providence | | – | | 2 | – | 7 | – | 0 |
| Rutgers | | – | | 2 | – | 7 | – | 0 |
| Boston University | | – | | 1 | – | 5 | – | 0 |
| Manhattan | | – | | 1 | – | 6 | – | 1 |
| Tufts | | – | | 1 | – | 6 | – | 0 |
| Drexel | | – | | 1 | – | 7 | – | 0 |
Rankings from Dickinson System

The 1925 Bucknell Bison football team was an American football team that represented Bucknell University as an independent during the 1925 college football season. In its second season under head coach Charley Moran, the team compiled a 7–3–1 record and shut out seven of its eleven opponents.

The team played its home games at Bucknell University Memorial Stadium in Lewisburg, Pennsylvania. The stadium opened for the 1924 football season, having been built at a cost of $500,000 with seating for 18,000 spectators.

== Schedule ==
| Date | Opponent | Site | Result | Attendance | Source |
|---|---|---|---|---|---|
| September 26 | Western Maryland | Bucknell University Memorial Stadium; Lewisburg, PA | W 17–0 | | |
| October 3 | St. Bonaventure | Bucknell University Memorial Stadium; Lewisburg, PA | W 13–0 | | |
| October 10 | George Washington | Bucknell University Memorial Stadium; Lewisburg, PA | W 21–0 | | |
| October 17 | Haskell^{†} | Bucknell University Memorial Stadium; Lewisburg, PA | T 0–0 | 8,000 | |
| October 24 | at Georgetown | Griffith Stadium; Washington, DC | W 3–2 | | |
| October 31 | at Holy Cross | Fitton Field; Worcester, MA | L 7–23 | | |
| November 7 | Gallaudet | Bucknell University Memorial Stadium; Lewisburg, PA | W 56–0 | | |
| November 14 | at Navy | Farragut Field; Annapolis, MD | L 7–13 | | |
| November 21 | Dickinson | Bucknell University Memorial Stadium; Lewisburg, PA | W 7–0 | 10,000 | |
| November 26 | at Detroit | University of Detroit Stadium; Detroit, MI | W 7–0 | 12,000 | |
| November 28 | at Dayton | Baujan Field; Dayton, OH | L 0–19 | | |
^{†}Homecoming
