= 1925 Drexel Dragons football team =

American college football season

1925 Drexel Dragons football
- Conference: Independent
- Record: 1–7
- Head coach: Harry J. O'Brien (4th season)
- Captain: Sukin

1925 Eastern college football independents records
	Conf.			Overall
Team	W	L	T	W		L		T
No. 1 Dartmouth		–		8	–	0	–	0
Fordham		–		9	–	1	–	0
No. 4 Colgate		–		7	–	0	–	2
No. 10 Pittsburgh		–		8	–	1	–	0
Syracuse		–		8	–	1	–	1
No. 11 Lafayette		–		7	–	1	–	1
Springfield		–		6	–	1	–	1
Princeton		–		5	–	1	–	1
Holy Cross		–		8	–	2	–	0
Penn		–		7	–	2	–	0
Army		–		7	–	2	–	0
Boston College		–		6	–	2	–	0
Cornell		–		6	–	2	–	0
NYU		–		6	–	2	–	1
Villanova		–		6	–	2	–	1
Washington & Jefferson		–		6	–	2	–	1
Carnegie Tech		–		5	–	2	–	1
Yale		–		5	–	2	–	1
Bucknell		–		7	–	3	–	1
Columbia		–		6	–	3	–	1
Muhlenberg		–		6	–	3	–	1
Temple		–		5	–	2	–	2
Harvard		–		4	–	3	–	1
Franklin & Marshall		–		5	–	4	–	0
Brown		–		5	–	4	–	1
Penn State		–		4	–	4	–	1
Buffalo		–		3	–	4	–	1
St. John's		–		3	–	4	–	0
Lehigh		–		3	–	5	–	1
Vermont		–		3	–	6	–	0
CCNY		–		2	–	5	–	0
Providence		–		2	–	7	–	0
Rutgers		–		2	–	7	–	0
Boston University		–		1	–	5	–	0
Manhattan		–		1	–	6	–	1
Tufts		–		1	–	6	–	0
Drexel		–		1	–	7	–	0
Rankings from Dickinson System

The 1925 Drexel Dragons football team was an American football team that represented Drexel University as an independent during the 1925 college football season. In its fourth season under head coach Harry J. O'Brien, Drexel compiled a 1–7 record. The team's only victory was over the New York Aggies.

== Schedule ==
Date	Opponent	Site	Result	Attendance	Source
September 26	at Georgetown	Griffith Stadium; Washington, DC	L 0–25	2,000	
October 10	at Lehigh	Taylor Stadium; Bethlehem, PA	L 0–38		
October 17	Susquehanna	Selinsgrove, PA	L 0–14		
October 24	at Johns Hopkins	Homewood Field; Baltimore, MD	L 0–13		
October 31	New York Aggies	Philadelphia, PA	W 23–0		
November 7	at Carnegie Tech	Forbes Field; Pittsburgh, PA	L 0–45		
November 14	Upsala	63rd & Walnut Sts.; Philadelphia, PA	L 0–13		
November 21	Saint Joseph's	Philadelphia, PA	L 3–13		

== Roster ==
1929 Drexel Dragons football team roster
Players
Coaches
Offense

Pos.	#	Name	Class
[[American football positions|]]		Clark
[[American football positions|]]		Stamm
[[American football positions|]]		Nelley
[[American football positions|]]		Calahan
[[American football positions|]]		Townsend
[[American football positions|]]		Gorman
[[American football positions|]]		C.W. Johnson
[[American football positions|]]		Cappuccio
[[American football positions|]]		Perry
[[American football positions|]]		Crothers
[[American football positions|]]		Major
[[American football positions|]]		Snyder
[[American football positions|]]		Heckman
[[American football positions|]]		Barr
[[American football positions|]]		Fortin
[[American football positions|]]		Jones
[[American football positions|]]		C. Johnson
[[American football positions|]]		Sweeten
[[American football positions|]]		Aigner
[[American football positions|]]		Williamson
[[American football positions|]]		Forte
[[American football positions|]]		Wallace
[[American football positions|]]		Becker
[[American football positions|]]		Forbes
[[American football positions|]]		Smith
[[American football positions|]]		Sukin (C)
[[American football positions|]]		Schwartz
[[American football positions|]]		Wolf
[[American football positions|]]		Ingram
[[American football positions|]]		Collins

Defense

Pos.	#	Name	Class

Special teams

Pos.	#	Name	Class

Head coach

- Harry J. O'Brien (Swarthmore)

Coordinators/assistant coaches

- Hall

Legend

- (C) Team captain
- (S) Suspended
- (I) Ineligible
- Injured
- Redshirt
