= 1925 Carnegie Tech Tartans football team =

American college football season

1925 Carnegie Tech Tartans football
- Conference: Independent
- Record: 5–2–1
- Head coach: Walter Steffen (11th season)
- Captain: Dike Beede
- Home stadium: Tech Field, Forbes Field

1925 Eastern college football independents records
	Conf.			Overall
Team	W	L	T	W		L		T
No. 1 Dartmouth		–		8	–	0	–	0
Fordham		–		9	–	1	–	0
No. 4 Colgate		–		7	–	0	–	2
No. 10 Pittsburgh		–		8	–	1	–	0
Syracuse		–		8	–	1	–	1
No. 11 Lafayette		–		7	–	1	–	1
Springfield		–		6	–	1	–	1
Princeton		–		5	–	1	–	1
Holy Cross		–		8	–	2	–	0
Penn		–		7	–	2	–	0
Army		–		7	–	2	–	0
Boston College		–		6	–	2	–	0
Cornell		–		6	–	2	–	0
NYU		–		6	–	2	–	1
Villanova		–		6	–	2	–	1
Washington & Jefferson		–		6	–	2	–	1
Carnegie Tech		–		5	–	2	–	1
Yale		–		5	–	2	–	1
Bucknell		–		7	–	3	–	1
Columbia		–		6	–	3	–	1
Muhlenberg		–		6	–	3	–	1
Temple		–		5	–	2	–	2
Harvard		–		4	–	3	–	1
Franklin & Marshall		–		5	–	4	–	0
Brown		–		5	–	4	–	1
Penn State		–		4	–	4	–	1
Buffalo		–		3	–	4	–	1
St. John's		–		3	–	4	–	0
Lehigh		–		3	–	5	–	1
Vermont		–		3	–	6	–	0
CCNY		–		2	–	5	–	0
Providence		–		2	–	7	–	0
Rutgers		–		2	–	7	–	0
Boston University		–		1	–	5	–	0
Manhattan		–		1	–	6	–	1
Tufts		–		1	–	6	–	0
Drexel		–		1	–	7	–	0
Rankings from Dickinson System

The 1925 Carnegie Tech Tartans football team was an American football team that represented the Carnegie Institute of Technology (now known as Carnegie Mellon University) as an independent during the 1925 college football season. In its 11th season under head coach Walter Steffen, the team compiled a 5–2–1 record and outscored opponents by a total of 161 to 47. The team played its first two home games at Tech Field in Pittsburgh and its last two at Forbes Field in the same city.

== Schedule ==
Date	Opponent	Site	Result	Attendance	Source
October 3	Thiel	Tech Field; Pittsburgh, PA	W 27–7		
October 10	Mount St. Mary's	Tech Field; Pittsburgh, PA	W 34–0		
October 17	at Washington & Jefferson	College Field; Washington, PA	T 0–0	12,000	
October 24	at Pittsburgh	Pitt Stadium; Pittsburgh, PA	L 0–12	40,000	
November 7	Drexel	Forbes Field; Pittsburgh, PA	W 45–0		
November 14	at Notre Dame	Cartier Field; South Bend, IN	L 0–26	26,000	
November 21	at Saint Louis	St. Louis University Field; St. Louis, MO	W 18–2	8,000	
November 28	Lehigh	Forbes Field; Pittsburgh, PA	W 37–0	8,000	
