= Chick Meehan =

American football player and coach (1893–1972)

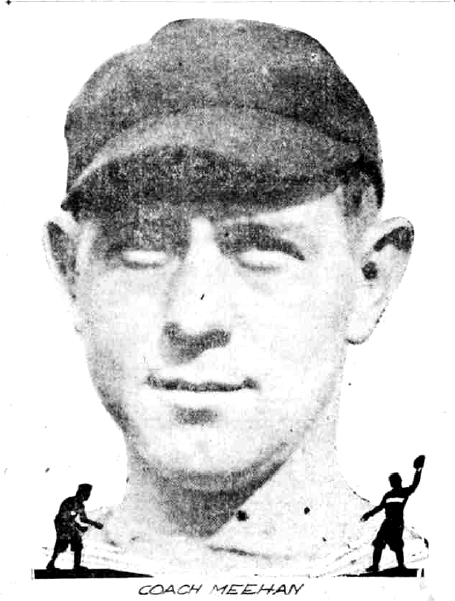

Biographical details
- Born: September 5, 1893
- Died: November 9, 1972 (aged 79); Syracuse, New York, U.S.

Playing career
- 1915–1917: Syracuse
- Position: Quarterback

Coaching career (HC unless noted)
- 1920–1924: Syracuse
- 1925–1931: NYU
- 1932–1937: Manhattan

Head coaching record
- Overall: 115–44–14

John Francis "Chick" Meehan (September 5, 1893 – November 9, 1972) was an American college football player and coach. He served as the head football coach at Syracuse University (1920–1924), New York University (1925–1931), and Manhattan College (1932–1937), compiling a career coaching record of 115–44–14. Meehan played quarterback at Syracuse from 1915 to 1917.

Meehan stated, "We learn practically nothing from a victory. All our information comes from a defeat. A winner forgets most of his mistakes."

== Coaching career ==
=== Syracuse ===
From 1920 to 1924, Meehan served as the head coach at Syracuse and compiled a 35–8–4 record. This total included back-to-back eight-win seasons in 1923 and 1924.

=== NYU ===
Meehan was the 19th head football coach at New York University (NYU), serving for seven seasons, from 1925 to 1931, and compiling a record of 49–15–4. This ranks him first at NYU in total wins and first at NYU in winning percentage. Meehan was awarded a place in NYU's athletic hall of fame for his coaching efforts.

=== Manhattan ===
Meehan's last head coaching job was at Manhattan College. He held that position for six seasons, from 1932 until 1937. His career coaching record at Manhattan was 31–21–6. This ranks him first at Manhattan in total wins and second at Manhattan in winning percentage.

== Death ==
Meehan died at the age of 79 on November 9, 1972, at a hospital in Syracuse, New York.

== Head coaching record ==
=== Football ===
Year	Team	Overall	Conference	Standing	Bowl/playoffs
Syracuse Orangemen (Independent) (1920–1924)
1920	Syracuse	6–2–1			
1921	Syracuse	7–2			
1922	Syracuse	6–1–2			
1923	Syracuse	8–1			
1924	Syracuse	8–2–1			
Syracuse:		35–8–4			
NYU Violets (Independent) (1925–1931)
1925	NYU	6–2–1			
1926	NYU	8–1			
1927	NYU	7–1–2			
1928	NYU	8–2			
1929	NYU	7–3			
1930	NYU	7–3			
1931	NYU	6–3–1			
NYU:		49–15–4			
Manhattan Jaspers (Independent) (1932–1937)
1932	Manhattan	5–3–2			L Palm Festival
1933	Manhattan	6–3–1			
1934	Manhattan	3–5–1			
1935	Manhattan	5–3–1			
1936	Manhattan	6–4			
1937	Manhattan	6–3–1			
Manhattan:		31–21–6			
Total:		115–44–14			
