= James F. McCarthy (coach) =

American football and baseball coach

Coaching career (HC unless noted)

Football
- 1925–1927: Manhattan

Baseball
- 1925–1928: Manhattan

Head coaching record
- Overall: 9–12–2 (football)

James F. McCarthy was an American football and baseball coach. He was the first head football coach at Manhattan College and he held that position for three seasons, from 1925 until 1927. His career coaching record at Manhattan was 9–12–2. This ranks him third at Manhattan in total wins and fourth at Manhattan in winning percentage.

Manhattan College played intercollegiate football for the first time in 1924 and produced a record of 4–4 that year, but there was no declared coach.
