= 1924 All-Eastern football team =

American all-star college football team

The 1924 All-Eastern football team consists of American football players chosen by various selectors as the best players at each position among the Eastern colleges and universities during the 1924 college football season.

== All-Eastern selections ==
=== Quarterbacks ===
- Edwin B. Dooley, Dartmouth (PGT-1; NSC-1; SG-1)
- George Pease, Columbia (NSC-2)
- Robert Dinsmore, Princeton (NEB-2)
- Williams, Princeton (NSC-3)

=== Halfbacks ===
- Walter Koppisch, Columbia (PGT-1; NSC-1; SG-1; NEB-1)
- Jack McBride, Syracuse (PGT-1; SG-1; NEB-2)
- Ducky Pond, Yale (NSC-2; SG-1; NEB-1)
- Heinie Benkert, Rutgers (PGT-2; NSC-1; NEB-2)
- Nick Nardacci, West Virginia (PGT-1)
- Al Kreuz, Penn (PGT-2; NSC-2)
- Eddie Tryon, Colgate (PGT-2)
- Frank Chicknoski, Lafayette (NEB-2)
- Andy Oberlander, Dartmouth (NSC-3)
- Jackson Keefer, Brown (NSC-3)

=== Fullbacks ===
- Homer Hazel, Rutgers (NSC-1; NEB-1)
- Erwin Gehrke, Harvard (PGT-2; NSC-2; SG-1)
- Charles Darling, Boston College (NSC-3; NEB-1)

=== Ends ===
- Richard Luman, Yale (PGT-1; NSC-1; SG-1)
- Charlie Berry, Lafayette (PGT-1; NSC-1)
- Henry Bjorkman, Dartmouth (PGT-2; NSC-2; NEB-1)
- Hilary Mahaney, Holy Cross (SG-1)
- Clark Craig, Penn (NEB-1)
- Ed Stout, Princeton (NSC-2; NEB-2)
- John Shepard Bingham, Yale (NSC-3; NEB-2)
- Gale Bullman, West Virginia Wesleyan (PGT-2)
- Frank L. Henderson, Cornell (NSC-3)

=== Tackles ===
- Bob Beattie, Princeton (NSC-1; SG-1; NEB-1)
- Ed McGinley, Penn (PGT-1; NSC-2; SG-1)
- Jules Prevost, Penn State (PGT-1; NSC-1; NEB-2)
- Mort Starobin, Syracuse (PGT-2; NEB-1)
- Bill Berrehsem, Washington & Jefferson (PGT-2)
- Sanford J. Goodman, Army (NSC-2)
- John Holleran, Dartmouth (NEB-2)
- Gates, Princeton (NSC-3)
- Johnny Joss, Yale (NSC-3)

=== Guards ===
- August W. Farwick, Army (PGT-2; NSC-1; SG-1; NEB-1)
- Carl Diehl, Dartmouth (SG-1; NEB-1)
- Johnny Budd, Lafayette (PGT-2; NSC-1)
- Alton Papworth, Penn (PGT-1; NEB-2)
- Ralph Hills, Princeton (PGT-1)
- Herbert Sturhahn, Yale (NSC-2)
- Lewis, Lehigh (NSC-2)
- House, Penn State (NEB-2)
- Stevens, Bucknell (NSC-3)
- William Brown, Lafayette (NSC-3)

=== Centers ===
- Edgar Garbisch, Army (NSC-2; SG-1; NEB-2)
- Winslow Lovejoy, Yale (NSC-1; NEB-1)
- Robert H. Fuller, Allegheny (PGT-1)
- Marsh Johnson, Pitt (PGT-2)
- Dolph Eckstein, Brown (NSC-3)

== Key ==
- PGT = Pittsburgh Gazette Times
- NSC = Newark Sunday Call
- SG = Schenectady Gazette, selected by 16 prominent eastern football writers
- NEB = Norman E. Brown, sports writer and editor

== See also ==
- 1924 College Football All-America Team
