= 1924 All-America college football team =

Official list of the best college football players of 1924

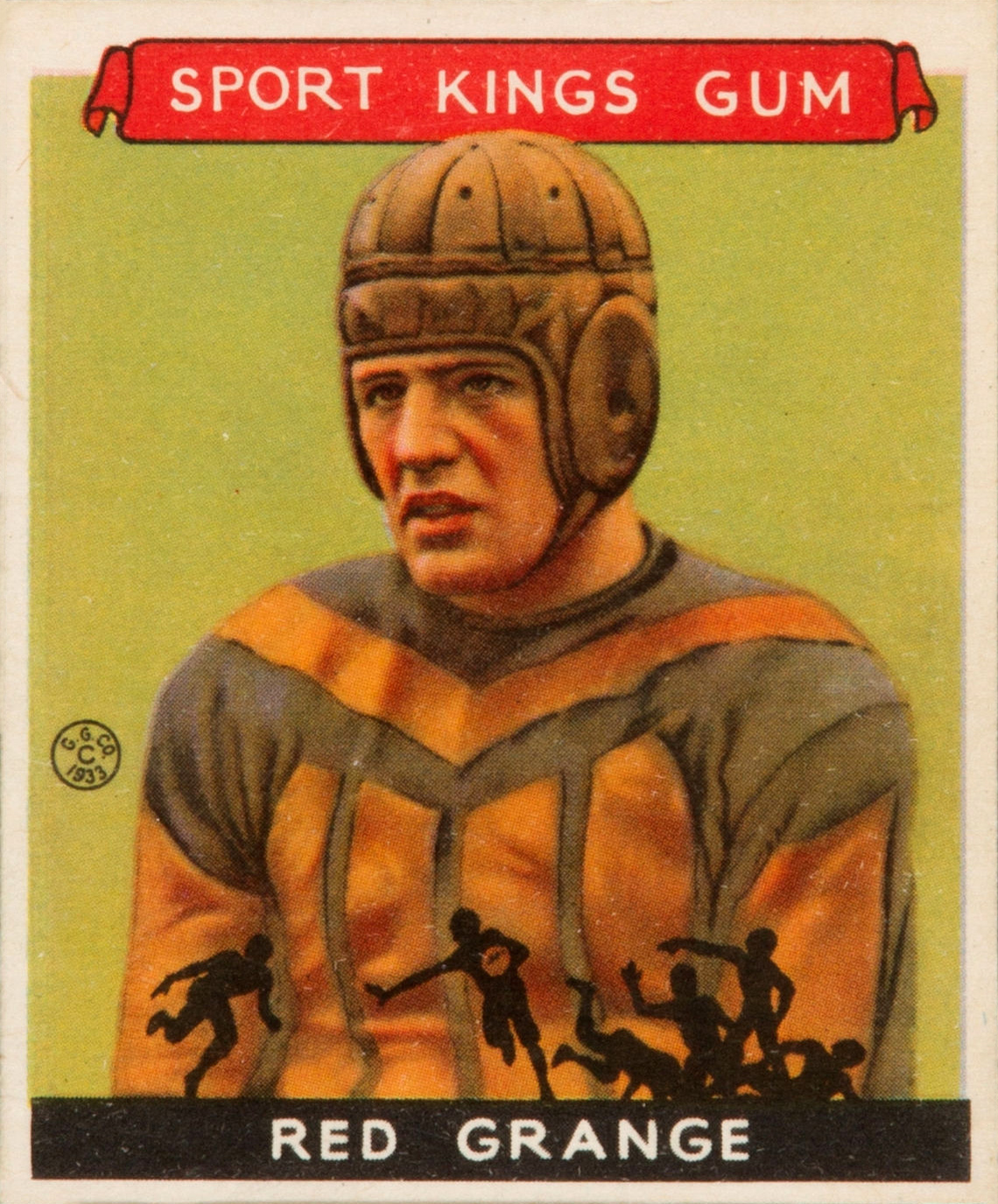
Red Grange, "The Galloping Ghost", was 1924's only unanimous All-American.

The 1924 All-America college football team wasd composed of college football players who were selected as All-Americans by various organizations and writers that chose All-America college football teams in 1924. The six selectors recognized by the NCAA as "official" for the 1924 season are:

(1) Walter Camp, whose selections were published in Collier's Weekly,

(2) Football World magazine (FW),

(3) the All-America Board (AAB),

(4) the International News Service (INS),

(5) Liberty magazine, and

(6) the Newspaper Enterprise Association (NEA).

The only unanimous All-American in 1924 was halfback Red Grange of Illinois, known as "The Galloping Ghost" and who in 2008 was named by ESPN as the best college football player of all time. The consensus All-Americans recognized by the NCAA for 1924 also include tackle Ed Weir, who was later named the 19th best athlete in Nebraska history, and three of Notre Dame's legendary Four Horseman (halfback Jim Crowley, quarterback Harry Stuhldreher, and fullback Elmer Layden).

== Consensus All-Americans ==
For the year 1924, the NCAA recognizes six All-American teams as "official" designations for purposes of its consensus determinations. The following chart identifies the NCAA-recognized consensus All-Americans and displays which first-team designations they received.

Name	Position	School	Number	Official	Other
Red Grange	Halfback	Illinois	6/6	AAB, FW, INS, LIB, NEA, WC	ASM, BC, DW, LP, NB, WE
Ed Weir	Tackle	Nebraska	5/6	AAB, FW, INS, LIB, WC	ASB, BC, BE, DW, NB, WE
Harry Stuhldreher	Quarterback	Notre Dame	5/6	AAB, INS, LIB, NEA, WC	BE, DW, LP, NB, WE
Ed McGinley	Tackle	Penn	4/6	AAB, INS, NEA, WC	BE, DW
Edwin C. Horrell	Center	California	4/6	INS, LIB, NEA, WC	BE, DW, WE
Jim Crowley	Halfback	Notre Dame	4/6	AAB, FW, INS, NEA	ASM, BC, BE, DW, NB, WE
Jim Lawson	End	Stanford	3/6	AAB, FW, NEA	ASM, BE
Carl Diehl	Guard	Dartmouth	3/6	INS, LIB, NEA	BE, DW, NB
Joe Pondelik	Guard	Chicago	3/6	AAB, INS, LIB	DW, LP, WE
Elmer Layden	Fullback	Notre Dame	3/6	AAB, INS, LIB	DW, NB, WE
Henry Wakefield	End	Vanderbilt	2/6	INS, NEA	BC, BE, DW, LP, NB
Richard Luman	End	Yale	2/6	AAB, INS	DW, LP, WE
Henry Bjorkman	End	Dartmouth	2/6	LIB, WC	WE

== All-Americans of 1924 ==
=== Ends ===
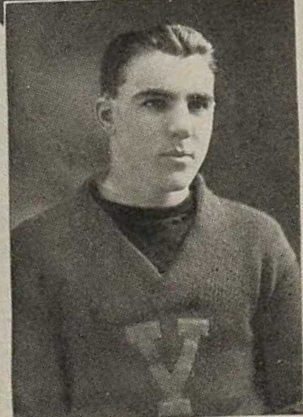
Vanderbilt's Hek Wakefield was the South's lone consensus All-American.

- **Jim Lawson**, Stanford (WC-2; AAB; FW; ASM-1; NEA; BE-1; DW-2; WE-2)
- **Richard Luman**, Yale (AAB; INS; LP-1; BE-2; DW-1; WE-1)
- **Henry "Hek" Wakefield**, Vanderbilt (WC-2; INS; NEA; LP-1; BE-1; NB-1; DW-1; WE-3; BC)
- Charlie Berry, Lafayette (WC-1; ASM-2; DW-3)
- Henry Bjorkman, Dartmouth (WC-1; ASM-2; LIB; NB-2; WE-1)
- Clark Craig, Penn (NB-1)
- Edmond Stout, Princeton (FW; ASM-1)
- Hilary Mahaney, Holy Cross (WC-3; LIB; FW; BE-2; DW-2; WE-2)
- Lowell Otte, Iowa (LP-2; DW-3; WE-3)
- Cal Hubbard, Centenary (College and Pro Football Hall of Fame) (LP-2)
- Frank Frazer, Army (WC-3)
- Steve Pulaski, Wisconsin (NB-2)
- Frank Rokusek, Illinois (NB-3; BC)
- Shep Bingham, Yale (NB-3)
- Frank Henderson, Cornell (ASM-3)
- Clarence Muhl, Illinois (ASM-3)

=== Tackles ===
- **Ed Weir**, Nebraska (College Football Hall of Fame) (WC-1; AAB; FW; ASM-1; INS; LIB; LP-2; BE-2; NB-1; DW-1; WE-1; BC)
- **Ed McGinley**, Penn (College Football Hall of Fame) (WC-1; AAB; INS; NEA; BE-1; DW-1; WE-2)
- Bob Beattie, Princeton (WC-2; NEA; BE-1; NB-2; DW-2; WE-1)
- Frank Gowdy, Chicago (WC-3; FW; ASM-1; LIB; LP-1; DW-2; WE-2)
- Johnny Joss, Yale (LP-1)
- Mordecai Starobin, Syracuse (NB-1)
- Tom Edwards, Michigan (LP-2)
- John W. Hancock, Iowa (ASM-2; BE-2; NB-2; BC)
- Pappy Waldorf, Syracuse (College Football Hall of Fame) (WC-2)
- Zeke Wissinger, Pittsburgh (WC-3)
- Jim Taylor, Georgia (NB-3)
- Jules Prevost, Penn State (ASM-2; NB-3)
- Norman Anderson, So. California (ASM-2; DW-3; WE-3)
- Joe Bach, Notre Dame (DW-3)
- Tex Cox, Minnesota (ASM-3)
- Charles Van Dyne, Missouri (WE-3)

=== Guards ===
- **Carl Diehl**, Dartmouth (INS; LIB; NEA; BE-1; DW-1; NB-1; WE-3)
- **Joe Pondelik**, Chicago (WC-2; AAB; INS; ASM-2; LIB; LP-1; DW-1; WE-1)
- Edliff Slaughter, Michigan (WC-1; LP-1; BE-2; NB-1; BC)
- August W. Farwick, Army (AAB; NEA; ASM-2; BE-1; NB-2; DW-2; WE-1)
- Alton Papworth, Penn (FW; ASM-1)
- Walter Mahan, West Virginia (WC-3; BE-2)
- Herbert Sturhahn, Yale (College Football Hall of Fame) (DW-2)
- Howard, Princeton (LP-2)
- Charles Parsons, Northwestern (LP-2; WE-3)
- George Abramson, Minnesota (WC-2; NB-2; WE-2; BC)
- Bill Fleckenstein, Iowa (WC-3)
- Bill Buckler, Alabama (NB-3)
- William House, Penn State (NB-3)
- Walt Godwin, Georgia Tech (DW-3)
- Harry Ellinger, Army (DW-3)
- Ralph Hills, Princeton (ASM-2)
- Adolph Bieberstein, Wisconsin (ASM-3)

=== Centers ===
- **Edwin C. Horrell**, California (College Football Hall of Fame) (WC-1 [g]; INS; ASM-3; LIB; NEA; BE-1; DW-1; WE-1)
- Adam Walsh, Notre Dame (College Football Hall of Fame) (WC-3; LP-1; ASM-2; BE-2; NB-2; DW-2; WE-2; BC)
- Edgar Garbisch, Army (College Football Hall of Fame) (WC-1; FW; ASM-1 [g]; NB-3; DW-3; WE-2 [g])
- Winslow Lovejoy, Yale (WC-2; AAB; FW; ASM-1; NB-1; WE-3)
- Shorty Propst, Alabama (LP-2)

=== Quarterbacks ===
- **Harry Stuhldreher**, Notre Dame (College Football Hall of Fame) (WC-1; AAB; INS; ASM-2; LIB; NEA; LP-1; BE-1; NB-1; DW-1; WE-1)
- Eddie Dooley, Dartmouth (FW; ASM-1; BE-2; DW-2; WE-2)
- Charles Darling, Boston College (LIB [hb]; NB-2)
- Tod Rockwell, Michigan (BC)
- Leland Parkin, Iowa (LP-2; NB-3; WE-3)
- Jacob Slagle, Princeton (WC-2)
- Skippy Stivers, Idaho (WC-3)
- Al Bloodgood, Nebraska (ASM-3)
- Herb Covington, Centre (DW-3)

=== Halfbacks ===
- **Red Grange**, Illinois (College Football Hall of Fame) (WC-1; AAB; FW; ASM-1; INS; LIB; NEA; LP-1 [fb]; BE-1; NB-1; DW-1; WE-1; BC)
- **Bob Red Hall**, Dartmouth (Liberty- LH behind Red Grange)
- **Jim Crowley**, Notre Dame (College Football Hall of Fame) (WC-2 [fb]; AAB; FW; ASM-1; INS; NEA; BE-1; NB-1; DW-1; WE-1; BC)
- Walter Koppisch, Columbia (College Football Hall of Fame) (WC-1; BE-2; NB-2; DW-2)
- Ralph Baker, Northwestern (LP-1; BE-2; NB-3; DW-2; WE-2)
- Ducky Pond, Yale (WC-2; NEA; ASM-2; NB-2; DW-3; WE-3; BE-1 [FB])
- Don Miller, Notre Dame (College Football Hall of Fame) (DW-3)
- Clarence Schutte, Minnesota (LP-2)
- Wildcat Wilson, Washington (WC-2)
- Heinie Benkert, Rutgers (ASM-2)
- Herb Steger, Michigan (ASM-3)
- Harry Wilson, Army (ASM-3)
- Tut Imlay, California (WC-3)
- Jackson Keefer, Brown (WC-3)
- Gil Reese, Vanderbilt (NB-3)
- Hust Stockton, Gonzaga (WE-2)
- Rudolph Bahr, Purdue (WE-3)

=== Fullbacks ===
- **Elmer Layden**, Notre Dame (College Football Hall of Fame) (AAB; INS; LIB; LP-2 [hb]; NB-1; DW-1; WE-1)
- Homer Hazel, Rutgers (College Football Hall of Fame) (WC-1; FW; ASM-1; NB-3; BC)
- Doug Wycoff, Georgia Tech (ASM-3; LP-1 [hb]; NB-2; DW-2; WE-3)
- Jack McBride, Syracuse (BE-2; DW-3; WE-2)
- John Webster Thomas, Chicago (LP-2)
- Red Strader, St. Mary's (WC-3)
- Austin "Five Yards" McCarty, Chicago (ASM-2)

=== Key ===
NCAA recognized selectors for 1924

- WC = Collier's Weekly as selected by Walter Camp
- AAB = All-America Board
- FW = Football World magazine
- INS = International News Service
- LIB = Liberty magazine
- NEA = Newspaper Editors Association

Other selectors

- ASM = All-Sports Magazine, selected from a combined vote of 312 prominent football coaches, officials and sport writers in all sections of the country, "representing the opinions of the best informed critics in all parts of the country, appear in the December number of All-Sports Magazine."
- NB = Norman E. Brown
- LP = Lawrence Perry
- BE = Billy Evans
- DW = Davis J. Walsh, sports editor of the International News Service
- WE = Walter Eckersall for the Chicago Tribune
- BC = Bruno Crenna

Bold = Consensus All-American

- 1 – First-team selection
- 2 – Second-team selection
- 3 – Third-team selection

== See also ==
- 1924 All-Big Ten Conference football team
- 1924 All-Eastern football team
- 1924 All-Pacific Coast football team
- 1924 All-Southern college football team
