= Gardena High School =

High school in Los Angeles, California, United States

Gardena Senior High School
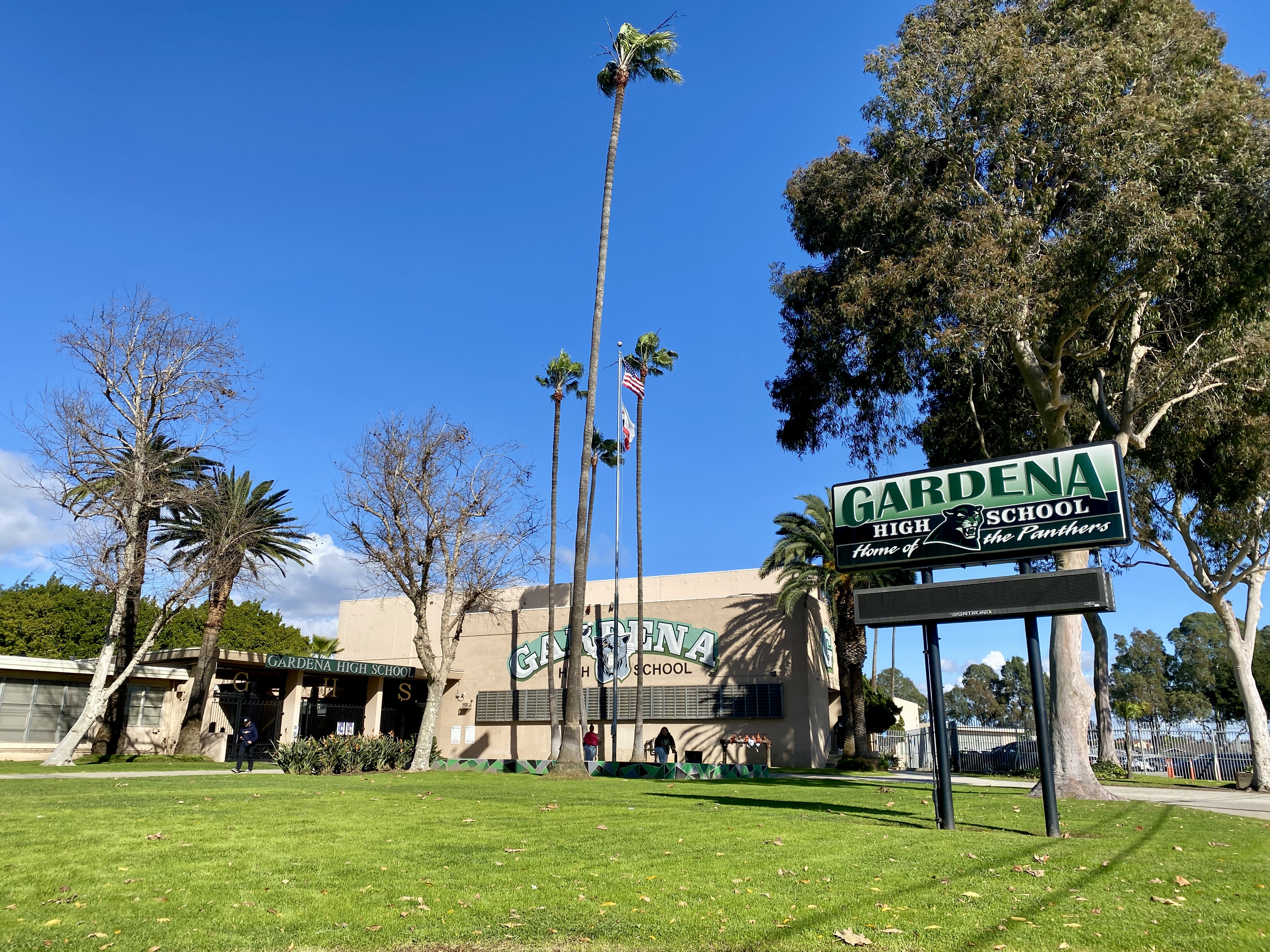

Location
- 1301 West 182nd Street; Gardena, California; United States; 33.867378°N 118.296586°W

Information
- Type: Public
- Motto: "Breaking Ground for the Future"
- Established: 1907
- Locale: City, Large
- School district: Los Angeles Unified School District (1961-); Los Angeles City High School District (1907-1961)
- NCES District ID: 0622710
- NCES School ID: 062271003034
- Principal: Sonia Buenrostro (2025-present)
- Teaching staff: 76.23 (on an FTE basis)
- Grades: 9–12
- Enrollment: 1,343 (2024–25)
  - Male: 698
  - Female: 645
- Student to teacher ratio: 17.62
- Colors: Dark green and white
- Athletics conference: Marine League; CIF Los Angeles City Section
- Mascot: Panther (formerly, The Mohicans, until it was changed after the class of 1998)
- Website: Official Website

Gardena High School is a public high school in the Harbor Gateway neighborhood of Los Angeles, California, United States, adjacent to the City of Gardena. It serves grades 9 through 12 and is a part of the Los Angeles Unified School District.

== Small learning communities ==
Gardena High School has two magnets and two academies on campus: the Global Business Magnet, the Law and Public Service Magnet, the Creative Arts Academy and the Science, Technology, Engineering, Arts, and Mathematics Academy.

== History ==
The Los Angeles Unified School District stated that Gardena High School opened in 1907. The original iteration of the school began in 1904. It changed buildings in 1905, and at that time became known as Jewell Union High School. A $20,000 bond for a replacement building was issued in 1906, and the school became known as Gardena High School and joined the Los Angeles City High School District the following year. Beginning in 1908 the school was known as Gardena Agricultural High School, but John Whitely, who took the position as principal in 1918, reverted the name.

Whitely in 1919, started a tradition of the 12th grade class, at the end of the year, buying a painting to bring to the school to add to the school's art collection. Gardena High was one of several schools that had painting collections. In 1999, Irvine Museum executive director Jean Stern stated that, in the words of Jean Merz of the Los Angeles Times, "the Gardena High collection is unique in its size and quality." In April 1932 Arthur Millier, writing for the Los Angeles Times, stated that ""

In 1956, the junior high school classes stayed at the old Gardena High School while the high school classes moved into a new building designed by architects Henry L. Gogerty (1894–1990) and D. Stewart Kerr. Up until the opening of the new Gardena High School, high school students held morning shifts, while junior high school students held afternoon shifts. The junior high is now known as Peary Middle School. The painting collection tradition ended with the move, and the paintings numbered 90. The majority were placed in a basement.

The official opening of the new high school was September 17, 1956. There were to be 67 teachers and 1,600 students in grades 10-12 upon opening. The price tag was about $5,000,000. Upon opening the curriculum and attendance boundary were largely to stay the same. The two non-English languages as a second language classes available were French and Spanish. The school opened with a working farm.

In 1961 the Los Angeles city high school district merged into the Los Angeles Unified School District.

Two additional classroom buildings were scheduled to begin construction in 1964.

In the 1990s California State University Dominguez Hills president Robert C. Detweiler and art director Kathy Zimmerer facilitated a planned restoration of the paintings and received a grant to establish an exhibition of about half of the paintings. Several of the paintings had received damage. Two had been destroyed by the conditions in the period 1955-circa 1995.

In 2015 the Autry Museum exhibited some of the works of art that had been displayed at Gardena High.

== Attendance boundary ==
The school serves the City of Gardena, portions of Carson, and portions of Los Angeles (including Harbor Gateway and portions of Wilmington).

== Features ==
The northern end of the campus has Los Angeles Unified School District staff housing, Sage Park Apartments. It takes up 3.5 acres (1.4 ha) of land. It opened in 2015. Its buildings have three and four stories each, and 90 units total are present.

== Demographics ==
As of the school year 2008–09, there were a total of 3,186 students attending the high school.

- 59.2% Hispanic (1,885)
- 1.4% White (46)
- 33.1% Black (1,053)
- 0.6% Native American (19)
- 4.7% Asian (149)
- 1.1% Pacific Islander (34)

== Notable alumni ==
- Nate Ness Played Defensive Back for Arizona Wildcats, he signed with the Cleveland Browns as an undrafted free agent and also played for the Miami Dolphins, Seattle Seahawks, St. Louis Rams, Carolina Panthers and the Detroit Lions
- Steven C. Bradford (Class of 1978): California Assemblyman, 2009–2014. California State Senator, 2016–2024.
- Enos Cabell: MLB, 1972–1986, with the Baltimore Orioles, Houston Astros, San Francisco Giants, Detroit Tigers, and the Los Angeles Dodgers.
- Wayne Collett: silver medalist in the 400 meters at the 1972 Summer Olympics in Munich.
- Dock Ellis (Class of 1963): MLB pitcher for the Pittsburgh Pirates, New York Yankees, Oakland Athletics, Texas Rangers, and New York Mets.
- George Farmer: NFL wide receiver, 1982–1984, 1987; attended Southern University, played for the Los Angeles Rams and Miami Dolphins.
- Glen Fukushima: Deputy Assistant U.S. Trade Representative for Japan and China, 1988–1990.
- Anthony Frederick: former Pepperdine standout; NBA player from 1987 to 1992.
- Warren Furutani: California Assemblyman, 2008–2012.
- Nesby Glasgow: NFL safety, 1979–1992; attended the University of Washington and was recognized as part of its Century Team.
- Dennis Gilbert: Sports agent, baseball executive and co-founder of the Professional Baseball Scouts Foundation.
- Gaston Green: NFL running back, 1988–1992, attended UCLA, played for the Los Angeles Rams and Denver Broncos. He was a Pro Bowl selection in 1991 as a Bronco.
- Kira Lynn Harris (Class of 1981): African-American mixed-media visual artist in New York City.
- Don Horn: NFL quarterback with the Green Bay Packers; their first-round pick (All-American) out of San Diego State University.
- D.L. Hughley (Class of 1981): comedian and actor.
- Keith Lee: Played defensive back for the Colorado State Rams and drafted in the fifth round of the 1980 NFL draft by the Buffalo Bills but only played with the New England Patriots and the Indianapolis Colts
- Niecy Nash: comedian and actress.
- Vincent Okamoto: Japanese American Vietnam War veteran, later prosecutor and judge.
- Michael "Tyga" Nguyen-Stevenson: American rapper.
- Butch Patrick: actor, portrayed Eddie Munster on The Munsters.
- Kevin A. Ross (Class of 1981): host, daytime syndicated court show America's Court with Judge Ross.
- Leo Terrell (Class of 1972): civil rights attorney and talk radio host on Talk Radio 790 KABC in Los Angeles.
- Glen Walker: NFL Played punter for the USC Trojans and for the Los Angeles Rams
- David Hollis played Defensive Back, Punt Returner, and Kick Returner for UNLV Rebels and for the Seattle Seahawks and the Kansas City Chiefs
- Clarence Duren played defensive back for the California Golden Bears and played for the St. Louis Cardinals and the San Diego Chargers.
- Windlan Hall played defensive back for the Arizona State Sun Devils and was drafted in the fourth round of the 1972 NFL draft by the San Francisco 49ers and also played for the Minnesota Vikings and the Washington Redskins (now known as the Washington Football Team)
- Steve Holden played wide receiver for Arizona State Sun Devils and was drafted in the first round of the 1973 NFL draft by the Cleveland Browns and also played for the Cincinnati Bengals
- Charlie Evans played running back for the Utah Utes and the USC Trojans and was drafted in the fourteenth round of the 1971 NFL draft by the New York Giants and also played for the Washington Redskins (also known as the Washington Football Team)
- Al Carmichael played running back for the USC Trojans and was drafted in the first round of the 1953 NFL draft by the Green Bay Packers and also played for the Denver Broncos.
- Lowell Wagner played back for the USC Trojans and played for the New York Yankees (now the New York Giants) and played for the San Francisco 49ers.
- Ernie Smith was a tackle for the USC Trojans and played for the Green Bay Packers who was a one time pro bowler, one time all-pro, and a two time NFL champion.
- John Nolan played guard for the Santa Clara Broncos and played for the Los Angeles Buccaneers
