= 1924 All-Big Ten Conference football team =

American college football all-star team

The 1924 All-Big Ten Conference football team consists of American football players selected to the All-Big Ten Conference teams chosen by various selectors for the 1924 Big Ten Conference football season.

== Ends ==
- Cookie Cunningham, Ohio State (BE-1; BI; DI-1; HC-2; IN-1; LD-1; WE-2)
- Lowell Otte, Iowa (BE-1; BI; DI-2; HC-1; IN-1; LD-2; WE-1)
- Chuck Kassel, Illinois (DI-1; WE-1)
- Steve Polaski, Wisconsin (BE-2; HC-2; IN-3; LD-1, DI-2)
- Rokusek, Illinois (HC-1; IN-2; LD-2)
- Walter H. Seidel, Northwestern (WE-2)
- Dick Romey, Iowa (BE-2)
- Fred Just, Minnesota (IN-2)
- Tom Hogan, Purdue (IN-3)

== Tackles ==
- Franklin Gowdy, Chicago (BE-1; BI; DI-1; HC-2; IN-1; LD-1; WE-1)
- John W. Hancock, Iowa (BE-1; HC-1; IN-1; LD-1; WE-2)
- Ted Cox, Minnesota (BI; LD-2; WE-1; BE-2; DI-1; HC-1; IN-3)
- Tom Edwards, Michigan (BE-2)
- Henderson, Chicago (WE-2)
- Richard L. Hall, Illinois (IN-2)
- Jack Harris, Wisconsin (DI-2; IN-2; HC-2 [fullback]; WE-2 [halfback])
- Ledrue Galloway, Iowa (DI-2)
- Louis Gross, Minnesota (HC-2)
- Ferd Wellman, Purdue (IN-3)

== Guards ==
- Joe Pondelik, Chicago (BE-1; BI; DI-1; HC-1; IN-1; LD-1; WE-1)
- George Abramson, Minnesota (BE-2; DI-1; IN-1; LD-1; WE-1)
- Edward Slaughter, Michigan (BE-1; BI; DI-2; HC-1; IN-2; LD-2; WE-3)
- Adolph Bieberstein, Wisconsin (BE-2; HC-2; IN-2)
- Charles W. Parsons, Northwestern (WE-2)
- Harold O. Steele, Michigan (WE-2)
- Henderson, Chicago (LD-2)
- Louis F. Slimmer, Illinois (HC-2; IN-3)
- Pokrass, Chicago (DI-2; IN-3)

== Centers ==
- Ralph Claypool, Purdue (IN-1; DI-1; HC-2; LD-1; WE-1)
- Robert J. Brown, Michigan (BE-1; HC-1; WE-3)
- Thomas Butler, Indiana (BE-2; BI; IN-2; LD-2)
- Tim Lowry, Northwestern (WE-2)
- Oscar Teckemeyer, Wisconsin (DI-2; IN-3)

== Quarterbacks ==
- Leland Parkin, Iowa (BE-1; BI [halfback]; DI-2; HC-1; IN-1; LD-1; WE-1)
- Tod Rockwell, Michigan (BE-2; HC-2; IN-2; WE-2)
- Max J. Lorber, Indiana (BI; IN-3; WE-3)
- Malcolm Graham, Minnesota (DI-1)
- Harry A. Hall, Illinois (LD-2)

== Halfbacks ==
- Ralph Baker, Northwestern (BE-1; DI-1; HC-1; IN-1; LD-1; WE-1)
- Red Grange, Illinois (BE-1; BI; DI-1; HC-1; IN-1; LD-1; WE-1)
- Rudolph Bahr, Purdue (HC-2; IN-2; WE-2)
- Wally McIlwain, Illinois (LD-2)
- Benny Friedman, Michigan (WE-3)
- Joseph F. Sloate, Indiana (WE-3)
- Wilbur Scantlebury, Iowa (IN-3)
- Herb Steger, Michigan (DI-2; IN-3)
- Thomas, Chicago (DI-2)

== Fullbacks ==
- Cully Lidberg, Minnesota (BE-1; HC-1; LD-1)
- Clarence Schutte, Minnesota (BE-2 [halfback]; DI-1; HC-2 [halfback]; IN-2 [halfback]; LD-2 [halfback]; WE-2)
- McCarty, Chicago (BE-2; BI; IN-1)
- Harry Thomas, Chicago (BE-2 [halfback]; WE-1)
- Earl Britton, Illinois (IN-2; LD-2; WE-3)
- Robert H. Wienecke, Northwestern (DI-2; IN-3)

== See also ==
- 1924 College Football All-America Team

== Key ==
BE = Billy Evans

BI = Bill Ingram, Indiana head football coach

DI = Daily Illini

HC = Hank Casserly, sporting editor of the Capital Times in Madison, Wisconsin

IN = The Indianapolis News

LD = Larry Dailey

WE = Walter Eckersall

Bold = Consensus first-team selection of a majority of selectors
