= Ralph Baker (halfback) =

American football player (1902–1977)

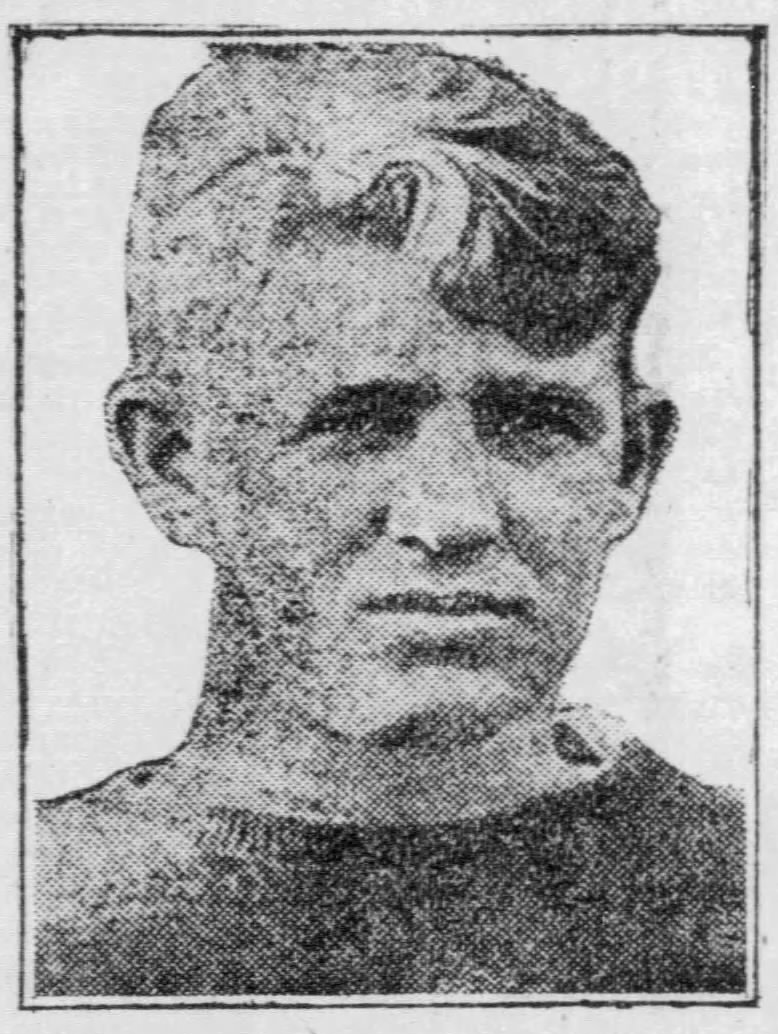

Northwestern Wildcats
- Position: Halfback

Personal information
- Born: June 28, 1902; Rochelle, Illinois, U.S.
- Died: August 3, 1977 (age 75); Portland, Oregon, U.S.

Career information
- College: Northwestern (1926)

Awards and highlights
- Consensus All-American (1926); Second-team All-American (1924); 2× First-team All-Big Ten (1924, 1926)
- College Football Hall of Fame

Ralph "Moon" Baker (June 28, 1902 – August 3, 1977) was an American football halfback in college.

He was the team captain of the Northwestern University football team, leading them to the Big Ten championship in 1926. Baker was an All-American along with teammate Bob Johnson. He was inducted into the College Football Hall of Fame in 1981.

Baker, a native of Rockford, Illinois, played one year at Illinois (alongside Red Grange) before transferring to Northwestern. He played both football and basketball for three years. After years as the conference doormat, the football team rallied behind Baker's "triple threat" abilities to a second-place finish in 1925 and the conference title in 1926. (Source: Press Release (no title), National Football Foundation and Hall of Fame, 28 January 1981)

He once said that his greatest thrill was the day he kicked two field goals against Notre Dame. "The Four Horsemen were playing for them then, you know," he said. The sophomore drop-kicked field goals of 34 and 36 yards in the 1924 game at Soldier Field in Chicago to give his upstart Wildcats the lead. However, the Irish rallied to win the game 13–6. Baker's school record of seven field goals in one season stood until the 1960s. (Source: Rockford Register-Star, "Moon Baker: Former Northwestern All-American was 'happy-go-lucky, determined and strong', 18 September 1977, Page F3)

== Myths and legends ==
Baker is occasionally reported to have been a member of Curly Lambeau's Green Bay Packers in the 1931 season. However, it was most likely that he was in those instances being of confused with fellow Northwestern alumnus and Phi Kappa Psi brother Frank Baker. Apparently unrelated to Ralph Baker, Frank Baker played varsity football at Northwestern in 1928, 1929 and 1930, as well as two games at end for the Packers in 1931. (Sources: Northwestern University Archives, "Frank L. Baker (1909-1985) Scrapbook, ca. 1924-1933, Series 31/6/53, retrieved 21 July 2007; Green Bay Packers History: All Time Roster retrieved 21 July 2007)

Less mystery surrounds his nickname, however. "Do you remember Moon Mullins?" he asked in a 1951 interview, referring to the famous comic strip. "Well, I knew Frank Willard, the cartoonist. Every day I used to grab the [Chicago Tribune] in the fraternity house, and I read the cartoon before I looked at sports or anything else." (Source: Rockford Register-Star, "Moon Baker: Former Northwestern All-American was 'happy-go-lucky, determined and strong', 18 September 1977, Page F3)
