= Joe Pondelik =

American football player (1902–1965)

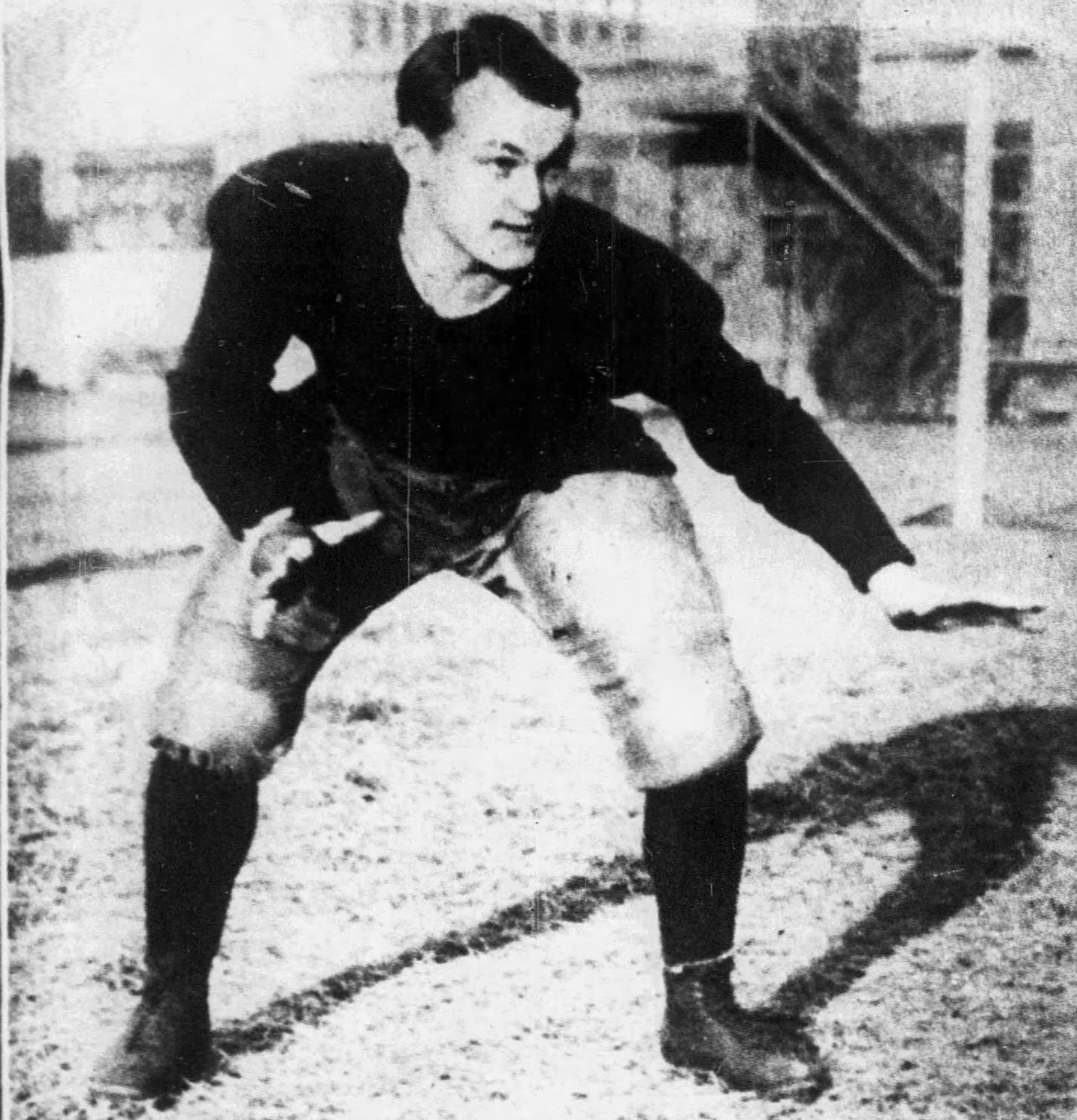
- Pondelik, 1924

No. 22
- Position: Guard

Personal information
- Born: May 8, 1902
- Died: January 23, 1965 (aged 62); Chicago, Illinois
- Listed height: 5 ft 11 in (1.80 m)
- Listed weight: 215 lb (98 kg)

Career information
- College: Chicago (1922–1924)

Awards and highlights
- Consensus All-American (1924); First-team All-Big Ten (1924)

Joseph Pondelik (May 8, 1902 – January 23, 1965) was an American football player.

Pondelik was born in 1902. He played college football for the Chicago Maroons football team of the University of Chicago from 1922 to 1924, and was a consensus first-team selection to the 1924 College Football All-America Team. In naming Pondelik as an All-American, Walter Eckersall wrote that Pondelik was "considered the best guard who ever played on one of Stagg's elevens."

In March 1926, Pondelik was married to Margaret Leigh, winner of the "Miss Chicago" contest. She filed for divorce the following year, alleging physical abuse.

Pondelik lived for 52 years in Cicero, Illinois, and was the founder of Joseph Pondelik Jr. Construction Company. He was also a pilot and hunter. He died in 1965 at age 62.
