= Pete Schaffnit =

American football player (1903–1959)

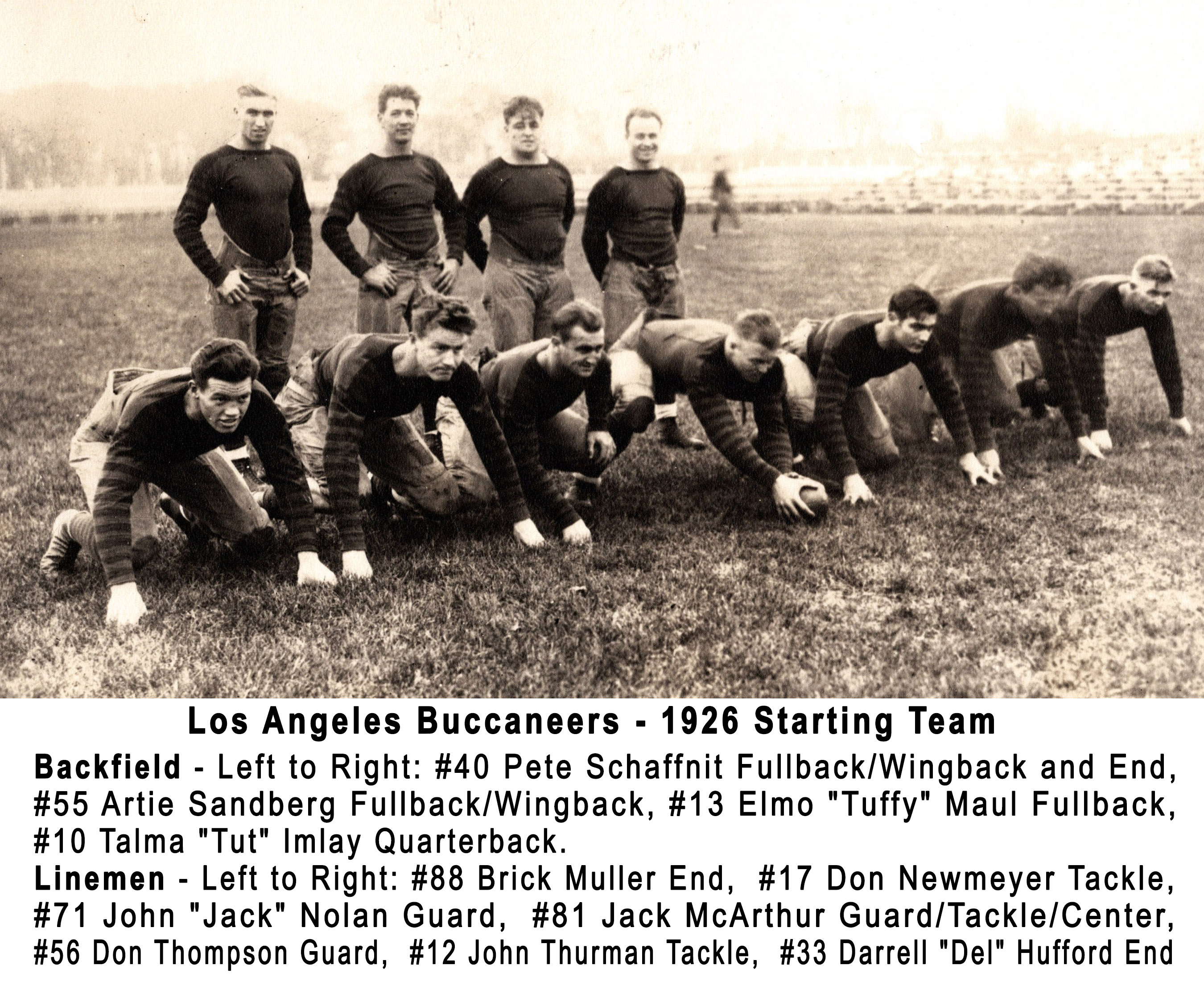
- Starting Team, 1926 Los Angeles Buccaneers

No. 40
- Positions: Fullback, halfback, end

Personal information
- Born: June 29, 1903; Denver, Colorado, U.S.
- Died: April 4, 1959 (aged 55); Los Angeles, California, U.S.
- Listed height: 5 ft 11 in (1.80 m)
- Listed weight: 180 lb (82 kg)

Career information
- High school: Bakersfield (Bakersfield, California)
- College: California

Career history
- Los Angeles Buccaneers (1926)

Career statistics
- Games played: 9
- Games started: 2
- Stats at Pro Football Reference

Peter Cornelius Schaffnit (June 29, 1903 – April 4, 1959) was a professional football player in the National Football League (NFL). He made his NFL debut in 1926 with the Los Angeles Buccaneers. He played only one season in the league.

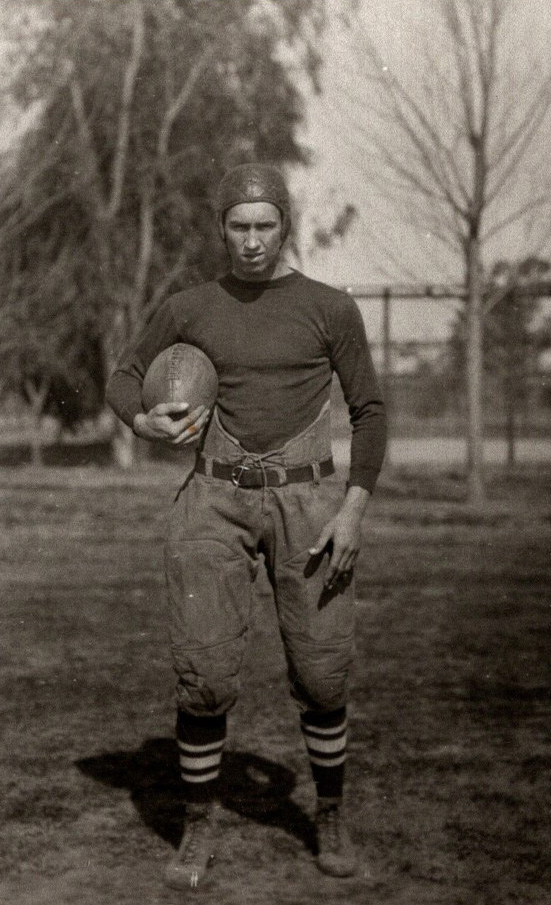
Pete Schaffnit, California State Champions, Senior Bakersfield High School, CA

Prior to joining the NFL, Pete played college football at the University of California at Berkeley.
