= Skippy Stivers =

American football and baseball player (1903–1985)

Profile
- Position: Quarterback

Career information
- College: Idaho (1922–1924)

Awards and highlights
- Third-team All-American (1924); First-team All-PCC (1924)

Vernon T. "Skippy" Stivers (December 18, 1903 – May 8, 1985) was a college football and baseball player. Stiver played at quarterback for the Idaho Vandals football team, and starred throughout the 1924 season, despite two dislocated vertebrae in his neck.
