= Ellery White =

American football player (1902–1964)

Profile
- Positions: Fullback, wingback

Personal information
- Born: December 16, 1902
- Died: 1964 (aged 61–62); Kansas City, Missouri, U.S.
- Listed weight: 175 lb (79 kg)

Career information
- College: None

Career history
- Los Angeles Buccaneers (1926)
- Stats at Pro Football Reference

William Ellery White (December 16, 1902 – 1964) was an American football player who played professionally in the National Football League (NFL) in 1926 with the Los Angeles Buccaneers. A native of Minneapolis, White later operated a food brokerage business called W. E. White Sales Company. He died in 1964, in Kansas City, Missouri.
