= Del Hufford =

American football player (1901–1984)

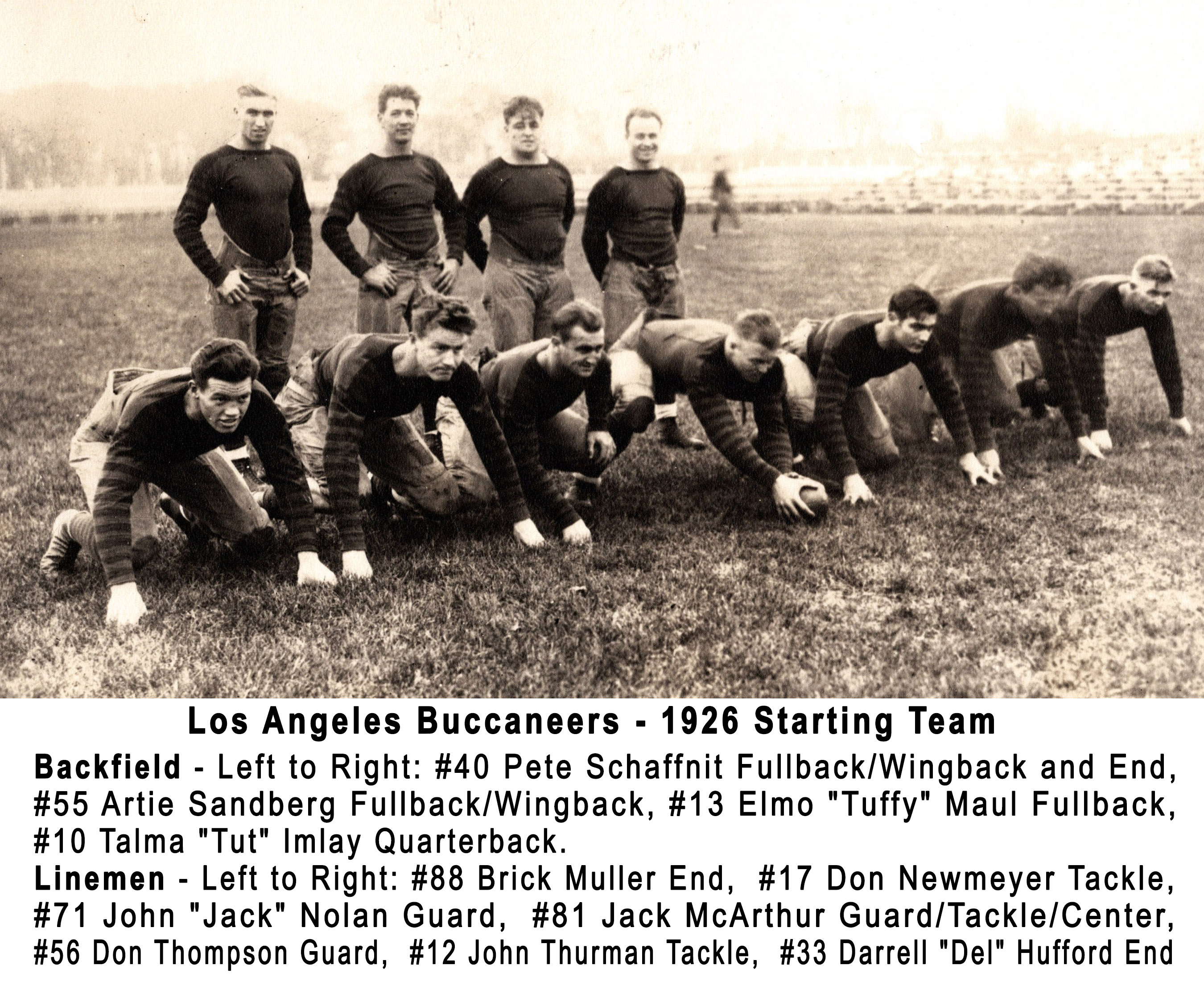
- Starting Team, 1924 Los Angeles Buccaneers

No. 11,
- Position: End

Personal information
- Born: January 18, 1901; Los Angeles, California
- Died: July 6, 1984 (aged 83); Camarillo, California
- Listed height: 5 ft 11 in (1.80 m)
- Listed weight: 185 lb (84 kg)

Career information
- College: University of California

Career history
- Los Angeles Buccaneers (1926)
- Stats at Pro Football Reference

Guy Darrell Hufford (1901–1984) was a professional football player in the National Football League. In 1926, he played for the Los Angeles Buccaneers, a traveling team based in Chicago.
