= Tuffy Maul =

American football player (1902–1974)

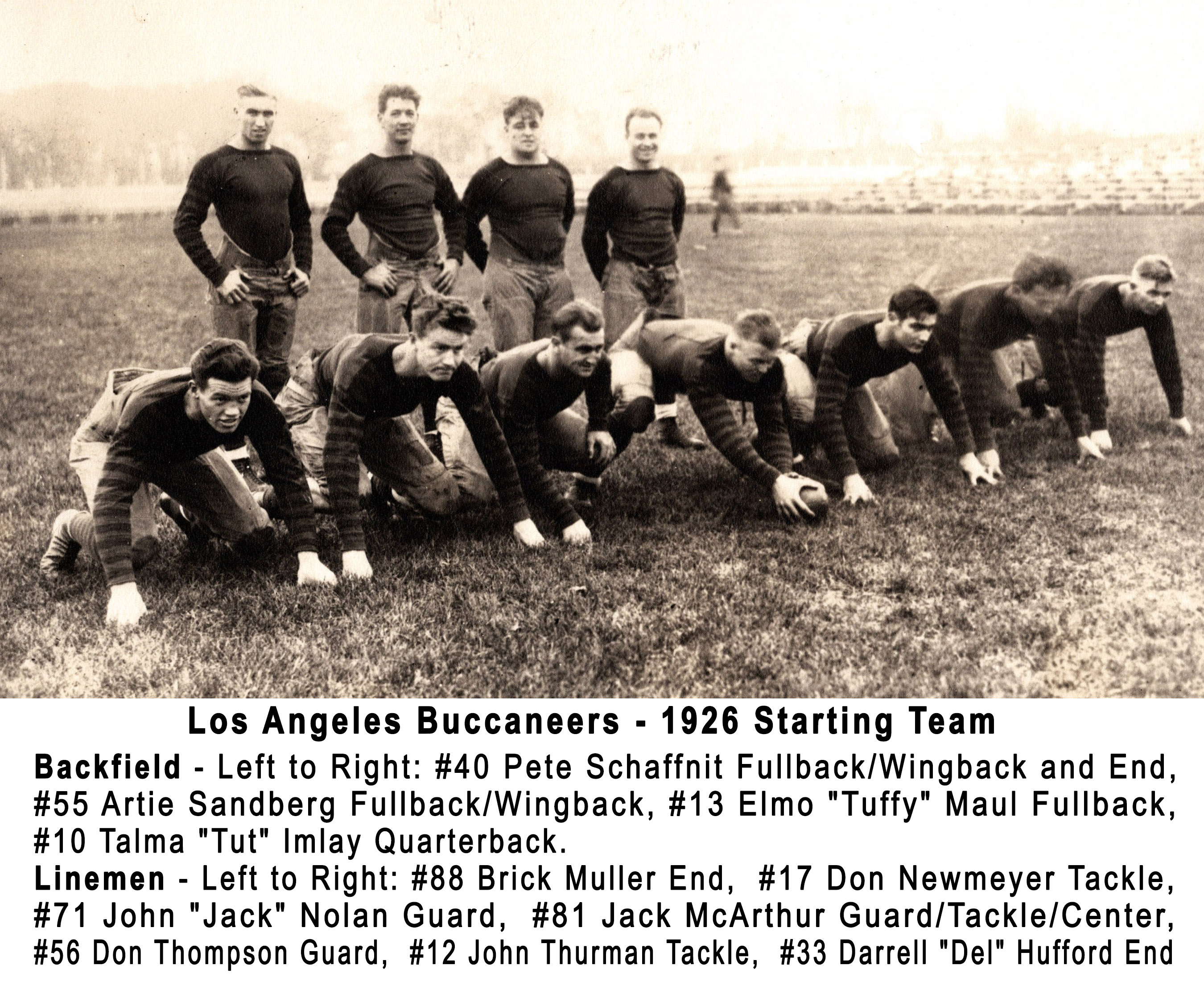

Profile
- Position: Fullback

Personal information
- Born: June 20, 1902; Fresno, California, U.S.
- Died: March 16, 1974 (aged 71); Fresno, California, U.S.
- Listed height: 5 ft 11 in (1.80 m)
- Listed weight: 200 lb (91 kg)

Career information
- High school: Fresno; Saint Mary's College (Berkeley, California); Commerce (San Francisco, California
- College: California (freshmen)

Career history
- Los Angeles Buccaneers (1926)

Career statistics
- Games played: 10
- Games started: 10

Elmo Alvin "Tuffy" Maul (June 20, 1902 – March 16, 1974) was an American professional football player who played for one season, in 1926, as a fullback in the National Football League (NFL) with the Los Angeles Buccaneers.

Maul was born on June 20, 1902, in Fresno, California. He attended Fresno High School, where played as a fullback in football and a third baseman in baseball. He also ran hurdles for the track team. Maul subsequently played football at Saint Mary's College High School in Berkeley, California and High School of Commerce in San Francisco. He then played on the freshmen football team at University of California, Berkeley, but was ruled ineligible from competing further in college football because he had played at the semi-pro level. He was given his nickname, "Tuffy", by his cousin, Crip Toomey, who starred for the California Golden Bears football team. Maul died on March 16, 1974.
