= Bull Finch =

American football player (1893–1956)

No. 18
- Position: Fullback

Personal information
- Born: March 1, 1893; North Loup, Nebraska
- Died: March 9, 1956 (aged 63); Los Angeles, California
- Listed height: 5 ft 8 in (1.73 m)
- Listed weight: 180 lb (82 kg)

Career information
- College: Whittier College

Career history
- Los Angeles Buccaneers (1926)
- Stats at Pro Football Reference

Olen "Bull" Finch (March 1, 1893 – March 9, 1956) was a professional football player who played in the National Football League with the Los Angeles Buccaneers in 1926. He played only one season in the NFL.

Finch played college football at Whittier College.
