= Kira Lynn Harris =

African-American mixed-media artist (born 1963)

- Born: 1963; Los Angeles, California, United States
- Education: University of California, Santa Cruz; California Institute of the Arts
- Occupation: Multi-media artist

Kira Lynn Harris (1963–2024) was an African-American mixed-media artist who lived and worked in New York City.

== Education ==
Kira Lynn Harris was born in 1963 in Los Angeles, California. She attended Henry Clay Junior High School and later Gardena High School where she was a standout academic student. Harris received her BA in Studio Art from the University of California, Santa Cruz, and then earned her MFA in Art from the California Institute of the Arts in 1998.

== Career ==
In addition to multiple solo and group exhibitions in the United States, Italy, Canada, and South Africa, Harris also served as an artist-in-residence at the Studio Museum in Harlem (2001–2002), the Center for Photography at Woodstock (2004), St. Mary's College of Maryland (2005), Omi International Art Center, Lower Manhattan Cultural Council, and the Delaware Center for Contemporary Art (2006). Her work has been exhibited at many galleries, including MoMA PS1, Miami Art Museum, Bruno Marina Gallery, and the Delaware Center for the Contemporary Arts. She has participated in the following group exhibitions: Blues for Smoke (MoCA and Whitney Museum), Black Light (White Noise Contemporary Art Museum and Freestyle Studio Museum Harlem).

Her work has been reviewed in The New York Times, Time Out New York, and the Los Angeles Times, among others. Critics have described her work as "minimal," making use of installation, drawing, photography, and video to express "formal concerns of space, light and the phenomenological with issues of individual subjectivity." She has also made use of reflective surfaces like mirror or silver leaf to highlight the architecture of space. Of her work, Harris explains, "My projects often provide a disorienting encounter for the viewer: in my installations I am concerned with destabilization and re-orientation. To achieve this I often create architectural and environmental interventions – by using light and reflective surfaces; by inverting subject and object or figure and ground; and/or by reversing up and down, exterior and interior."

Harris stated that her work was influenced by artists such as James Turrell, Mark Rothko, and the Hudson River School painters. She also explained, "A lot of my interest in light came from being from Los Angeles, where the light is just everywhere. You have these huge expanses of sky." She has also cited science fiction, as well as films and cityscapes like Metropolis and Mad Max as influences.

=== Works ===
- Interstices, 1997 Rosamund Fesen Gallery and at GAle GAtes et Al
- 96 Degrees in the Shade, 2001
- Void, River, Nocturne, 2001
- Falling Up, 2003
- Waterfall, 2005 MoMa PS1
- Crescendo, 2006
- Untitled (Pyramid), 2007 Contemporary Arts Museum Houston.
- Just Beyond Reality, 2009 CUE Art Foundation in New York City.
- The Block, 2011

=== Prizes and awards ===
In 1998, Harris won the Lorser Feitelson Emerging Artist award. In 2003 she won the Harvestworks artist-in-residence video production grant.

== Personal life ==
Harris lived in New York City, New York, and taught art to both high schoolers and college students. She was an assistant professor in the Department of Art and Music at John Jay College, as well as a part of the Art Faculty at Nightingale-Bamford School. She died in 2024 in New York City at the age of 61 years old.
