= Keith Lee (American football) =

American football player (born 1957)

No. 22, 42
- Position: Cornerback

Personal information
- Born: December 22, 1957 (age 68); San Antonio, Texas, U.S.
- Listed height: 5 ft 11 in (1.80 m)
- Listed weight: 192 lb (87 kg)

Career information
- High school: Gardena (Los Angeles)
- College: Colorado State
- NFL draft: 1980: 5th round, 129th overall pick

Career history
- Buffalo Bills (1980); New England Patriots (1981–1984); Indianapolis Colts (1985)

Career NFL statistics
- Interceptions: 1
- Fumble recoveries: 2
- Sacks: 1
- Stats at Pro Football Reference

Keith Lamar Lee (born December 22, 1957) is an American former professional football player who was a defensive back for five seasons in the National Football League (NFL) with the New England Patriots and Indianapolis Colts. He was selected by the Buffalo Bills in the fifth round of the 1980 NFL draft. He first enrolled at Santa Monica Community College before transferring to play college football for the Colorado State Rams.

== Early life and college ==
Keith Lamar Lee was born on December 22, 1957, in San Antonio, Texas. He attended Gardena High School in Los Angeles.

Lee played college football at Santa Monica Community College from 1976 to 1977 and earned junior college All-American honors.

He lettered for the Colorado State Rams from 1978 to 1979 as a quarterback. He completed 51 of 122 passes (41.8%) for 703 yards, seven touchdowns, and eight interceptions in 1978 while also rushing 126 times for 392 yards and four touchdowns. In 1979, Lee totaled 77 of 166 pass completions (46.4%) for 993 yards, four touchdowns, and eight interceptions, and 137 carries for 200 yards and three touchdowns. He was elected the Colorado State University student body vice president his senior year, becoming the first black student in school history to hold a student government position.

== Professional career ==
Lee was selected by the Buffalo Bills in the 5th round, with the 129th overall pick, of the 1980 NFL draft as a defensive back. He was placed on injured reserve on August 21, 1980, and spent the entire season there. He was released the next year on August 25, 1981.

Lee signed with the New England Patriots on August 28, 1981. He played in 15 games, starting six, during the 1981 season, recording one interception and two kick returns for 20 yards. He appeared in nine games, starting two, in 1982 and returned one kick for 14 yards. He also played in one playoff game, a start, that year, recovering one fumble. Lee played in 15 games in 1983, totaling four kick returns for 40 yards, one punt return for no yards, one fumble, and two fumble recoveries. He appeared in 15 games for the second straight season in 1984, returning three kicks for 43 yards. Lee was released by the Patriots on August 19, 1985.

Lee was signed by the Indianapolis Colts on September 12, 1985, and played in 14 games for the Colts that season, accumulating one sack and one kick return for six yards. He retired on July 26, 1986.

== Post-playing career ==
After retiring from the NFL, Lee has been a speaker, consultant, and board member for many different organizations, including a stint as the Chief Operating Officer of the National Consortium for Academics and Sports. He has written an op-ed for The New York Times and also appeared on televisions shows such as Nightline, ESPN, and ABC Nightly News to address various issues in sports. He was awarded the Anti-Defamation League's "World of Difference Award" in 1991.
