= Juddy Ash =

American football player (1900–1965)

Profile
- Position: Guard

Personal information
- Born: July 12, 1900; San Francisco, California
- Died: October 30, 1965 (aged 65); Newport, Oregon
- Listed height: 6 ft 2 in (1.88 m)
- Listed weight: 205 lb (93 kg)

Career information
- College: Oregon State University

Career history
- Los Angeles Buccaneers (1926)
- Stats at Pro Football Reference

Julian Samuel "Juddy" Ash was a professional football player who played in the National Football League. He played only one year in the NFL, during the 1926 season for the Los Angeles Buccaneers.
