= George Abramson =

American football player (1903–1985)

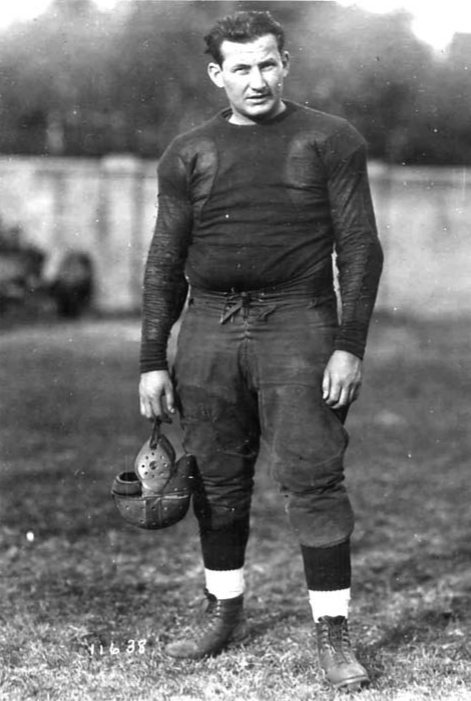

No. 12
- Positions: Guard, placekicker

Personal information
- Born: May 13, 1903; Eveleth, Minnesota, U.S.
- Died: March 15, 1985 (aged 81); Beverly Hills, California, U.S.
- Listed height: 5 ft 7 in (1.70 m)
- Listed weight: 198 lb (90 kg)

Career information
- High school: Virginia (Virginia, Minnesota)
- College: Minnesota (1921–1924)

Career history
- Green Bay Packers (1925)

Awards and highlights
- Second-team All-American (1924); First-team All-Big Ten (1924)

Career statistics
- Games played: 10
- Games started: 5
- Points scored: 8
- Stats at Pro Football Reference

George N. Abramson (May 13, 1903 – March 15, 1985) was an American professional football guard and placekicker who played for the Green Bay Packers in the National Football League (NFL). He played college football for the Minnesota Golden Gophers.

== Personal life ==
Abramson (known as George Abrahamson in his childhood) was born in Eveleth, Minnesota, spent his childhood in Aurora, Minnesota, and graduated from Aurora High School in 1919. He moved to Virginia, Minnesota with his family in 1920. After that he started a furniture business where he had 3 stores around Illinois and retired to the Bay Area in 1964.

Abramson was Jewish and was said to speak Yiddish with a Jewish teammate on the field during games in college. He was cousins with Arthur Naftalin, the first Jewish mayor of Minneapolis.

After his football career, he moved to Kewanee, Illinois and then to California. He died in 1985.

== College career ==
Abramson played for the Minnesota Golden Gophers. During the 1922 and 1923 seasons, he was named as an honorable mention to the Walter Camp All-American team. In 1924, he was named second-team All-American and first-team All-Western Conference.

At Minnesota, Abramson was a member of the Sigma Alpha Mu fraternity.

== Professional career ==
Abramson played 10 games for the Green Bay Packers, where he's recorded as having made two field goals and two extra points. He attempted and made the first fair catch kick in NFL history.

== Professional stats ==
Season	Team	Games	Overall FGs		PATs
Season	Team	GP	Lng	FGM	XPM
1925	Green Bay Packers	10	35	2	2
