= Don Thompson (American football guard) =

American football player (1902–1969)

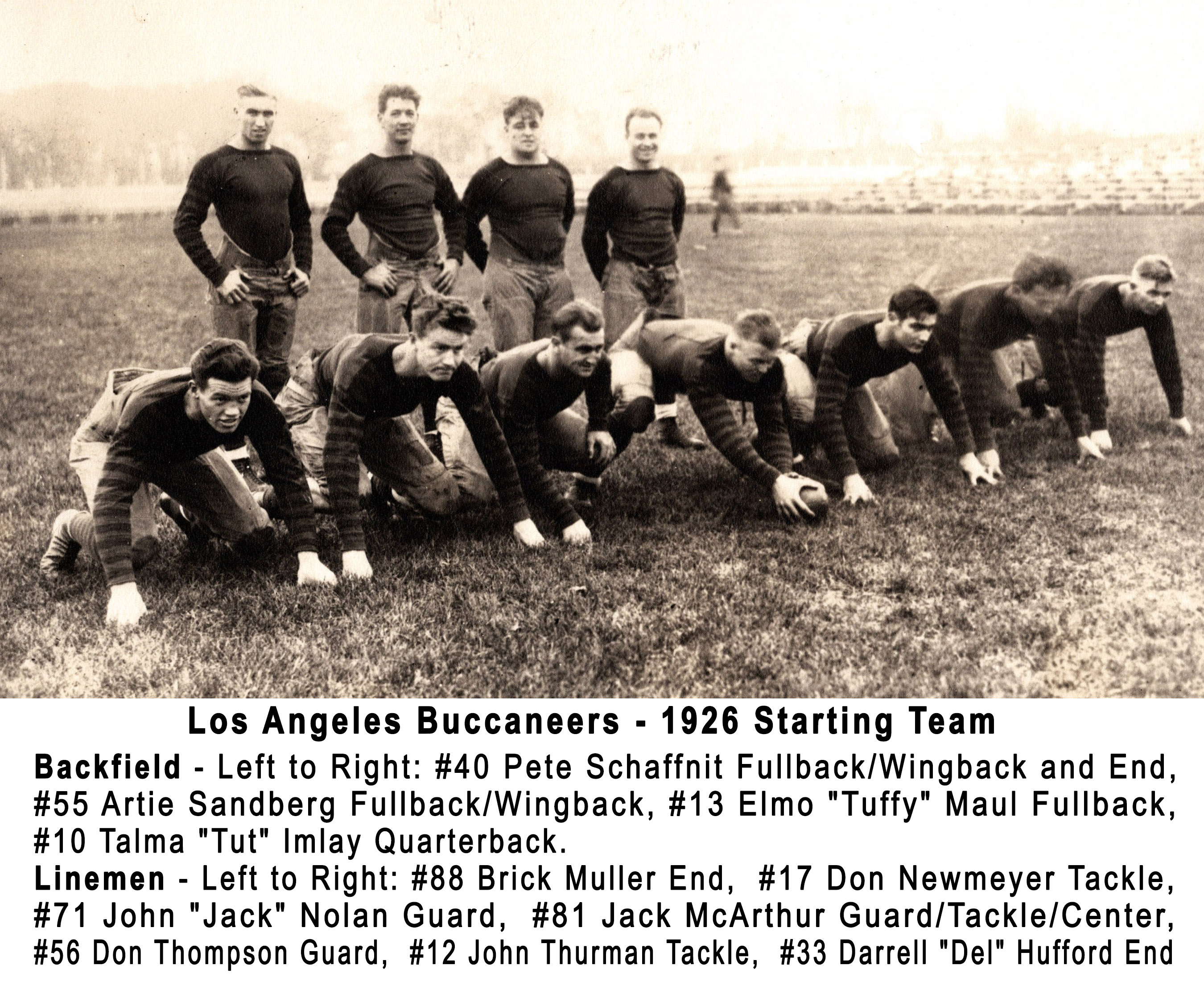

No. 56
- Position: Guard

Personal information
- Born: November 9, 1902; Rangoon, Burma, British India
- Died: November 9, 1968 (aged 65); Flagstaff, Arizona
- Listed height: 6 ft 2 in (1.88 m)
- Listed weight: 205 lb (93 kg)

Career information
- High school: Eugene (Eugene, Oregon)
- College: Redlands

Career history
- Los Angeles Buccaneers (1926)

Career statistics
- Games played: 10
- Touchdowns: 2
- Stats at Pro Football Reference

Robert Donald Thompson (December 21, 1902 – November 9, 1968) was a football player and radio announcer. He played college football at Redlands and in the National Football League for the Los Angeles Buccaneers during their only season in 1926.

== Early life and football career ==
Thompson was born in 1902 in Rangoon, British Burma, where his mother was a medical missionary. His father was a captain in the United States Navy. Thompson grew up in Redlands, California and Eugene, Oregon and graduated from Eugene High School (now South Eugene High School) in 1920. At Redlands College (now the University of Redlands), Thompson played at guard for Redlands Bulldogs football from 1921 to 1923.

In 1926, Thompson played at guard for the Los Angeles Buccaneers of the NFL. During what would be the Buccaneers' only season in existence, Thompson played in 10 games and scored two touchdowns.

== Radio and military career ==
Thompson began a radio career in 1928 as a continuity announcer and writer for KPO, the NBC Radio station in San Francisco. After impressing veteran broadcaster Graham McNamee and an NBC Radio executive when filling in as a last-minute announcer for the 1928 East–West Shrine Game, Thompson began to do football play-by-play regularly. Around 1931, Thompson began hosting a 15-minute sports talk show based at KPO and distributed to three other West Coast radio stations: KGA in Spokane, Washington; KJR in Seattle; and KEX in Portland, Oregon. Regarded as "the outstanding football announcer in the west," Thompson announced each edition of the Rose Bowl Game for NBC from 1931 to 1934. In 1932, Thompson joined the national NBC Radio network as director of special events. Then in 1935, Thompson became West Coast special events producer, where he produced special remote broadcasts from places such as Boulder Dam and San Diego.

During World War II, Thompson was a lieutenant commander for intelligence in the United States Navy. Thompson also helped create the Navy's radio networks in Guam and Pearl Harbor. After the war, Thompson returned to NBC Radio as supervisor of night programming.

Thompson retired from NBC in 1967 as West Coast manager of facilities administration.

== Personal life ==
Thompson married Celia Martinez in 1932. They had a son born in 1943. On November 9, 1968, Thompson died in Flagstaff, Arizona.
