= Windlan Hall =

American football player (born 1950)

No. 43, 40
- Position: Defensive back

Personal information
- Born: March 11, 1950 (age 76); Los Angeles, California, U.S.
- Listed height: 5 ft 11 in (1.80 m)
- Listed weight: 178 lb (81 kg)

Career information
- High school: Gardena (CA)
- College: Arizona State
- NFL draft: 1972: 4th round, 96th overall pick

Career history
- San Francisco 49ers (1972–1975); Minnesota Vikings (1976–1977); Washington Redskins (1977)

Awards and highlights
- 2× Second-team All-American (1970, 1971)

Career NFL statistics
- Interceptions: 2
- Fumble recoveries: 7
- Total TDs: 2
- Stats at Pro Football Reference

Windlan Edsel Hall (born March 11, 1950) is an American former professional football player who was a defensive back in the National Football League (NFL). He played for the San Francisco 49ers, the Minnesota Vikings, and the Washington Redskins. He played college football for the Arizona State Sun Devils and was selected in the fourth round of the 1972 NFL draft. He played high school football at Gardena High School.
