= Dana Carey =

American football player (1903–1976)

Profile
- Position: Guard

Personal information
- Born: February 3, 1903; California, U.S.
- Died: March 22, 1976 (age 73); Napa County, California, U.S.

Career information
- College: California

Career history
- Los Angeles Wildcats (1926)

Awards and highlights
- First-team All-American (1925); 2× First-team All-PCC (1924, 1925)

Henry Dana Carey (February 3, 1903 – March 22, 1976) was an American football player. A native of California, Carey attended the University of California, Berkeley. He played college football for the California Golden Bears football team and was selected by Liberty as a first-team player on the 1925 College Football All-America Team. He also received All-American honors in 1925 from the Associated Press (3rd team), the All-America Board (2nd team), and Collier's Weekly (2nd team). While in college he was initiated into Sigma Pi fraternity. In 1926, he played professional football for the Los Angeles Wildcats in the first American Football League.

After leaving football he became a dentist in Berkeley, California. He died in 1976.
