= Don Newmeyer =

American football player (1902–1992)

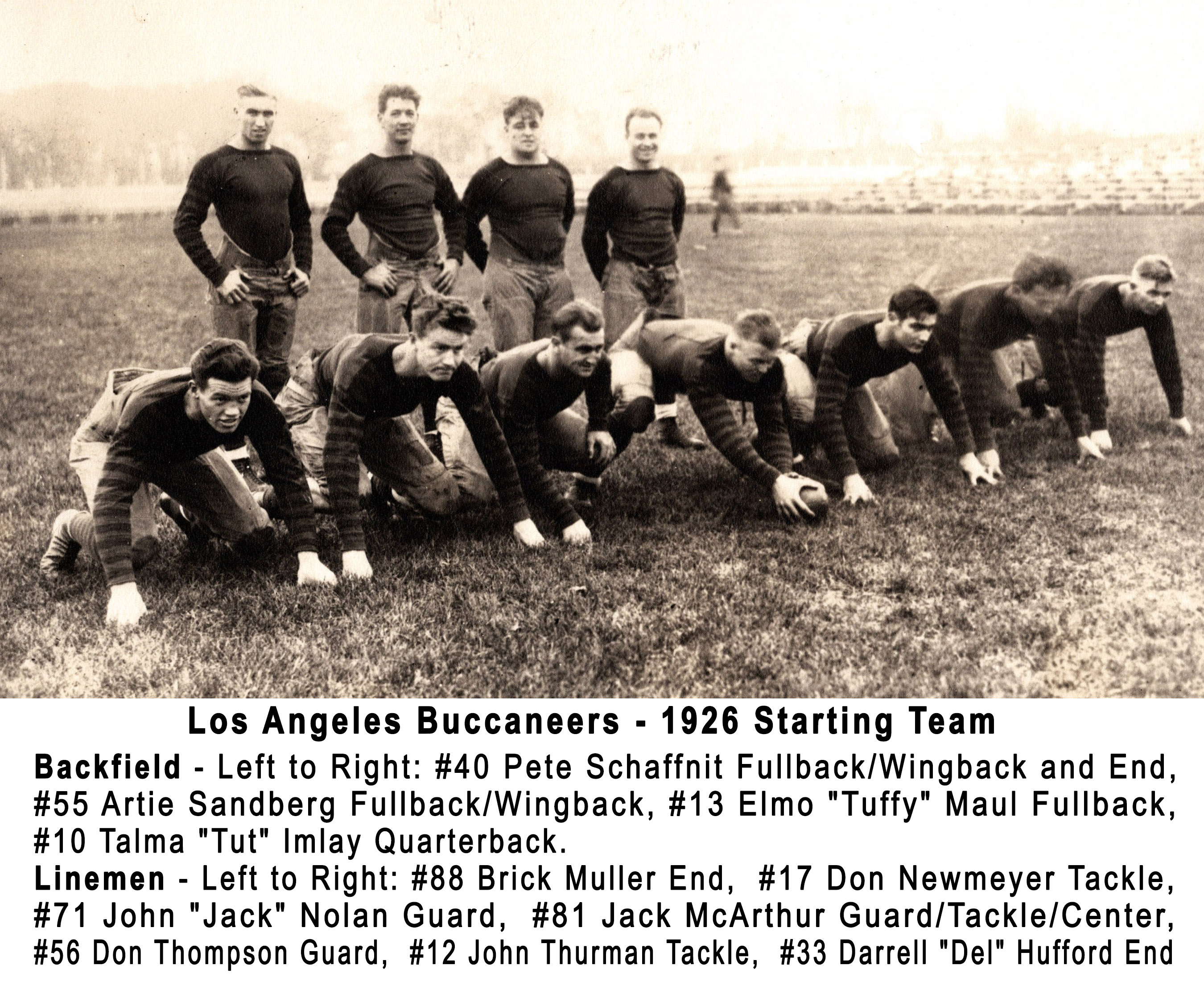

No. 10
- Position: Tackle

Personal information
- Born: February 13, 1902; Cleveland, Ohio, U.S.
- Died: June 25, 1992 (aged 90); Napa, California, U.S.
- Listed height: 6 ft 2 in (1.88 m)
- Listed weight: 205 lb (93 kg)

Career information
- High school: Berkeley (Berkeley, California)
- College: California

Career history

Playing
- Los Angeles Buccaneers (1926)

Coaching
- Los Angeles City (1942) Head coach; Los Angeles City (1945–1946) Head coach

Career statistics
- Games played: 10
- Games started: 10
- Stats at Pro Football Reference

Donald Charles Newmeyer (February 13, 1902 – June 25, 1992) was an American football player and coach. He played professionally as a tackle in the National Football League (NFL) for the Los Angeles Buccaneers, a traveling team based in Chicago during the 1926 season. Newmeyer played college football at the University of California—now known as the University of California, Berkeley—under head coach Andy Smith. He later served as head of the physical education department and head football coach at Los Angeles City College (LACC).

Newmeyer and his wife, Helen, were the parents of actress Julie Newmar. He died on June 25, 1992, at a nursing home in Napa, California.
