= Dennis Gilbert (baseball) =

Baseball player, agent, and executive

Dennis Gilbert (born 1947) is a former sports agent and baseball executive. He is the co-founder of Beverly Hills Sports Council, a sports agency that has represented numerous professional baseball players.

== Early career ==
Gilbert went to Gardena High School and L.A. City College. Gilbert played professional baseball in the Red Sox and Mets minor league systems before entering the life insurance business at age 24. When a friend of his who was a baseball agent died unexpectedly, Gilbert took over representation for some of his clients.

== Beverly Hills Sports Council ==
In 1984, Gilbert and fellow former minor-leaguer Rick Thurman founded Beverly Hills Sports Council; over the next few years it became one of the most powerful sports agencies in Major League Baseball. Gilbert represented numerous star players that signed some of the most lucrative contracts in professional sports in the 1980s and 1990s, including Barry Bonds, Bobby Bonilla, Jose Canseco, George Brett, Bret Saberhagen and Danny Tartabull. Gilbert sold his share of the agency to his partners in January 1999, retiring from the sports agent business at the age of 51.

== Chicago White Sox ==
In November 2000, Gilbert joined the Chicago White Sox as a special assistant to owner and chairman Jerry Reinsdorf.

== Professional Baseball Scouts Foundation ==
In 2002, Gilbert started the Professional Baseball Scouts Foundation, a non-profit organization which raises money for ill or financially troubled scouts.

== Accolades ==
In 1998 he was inducted into the Southern California Jewish Sports Hall of Fame.
