= John Nolan (guard) =

American football player (1899–1973)

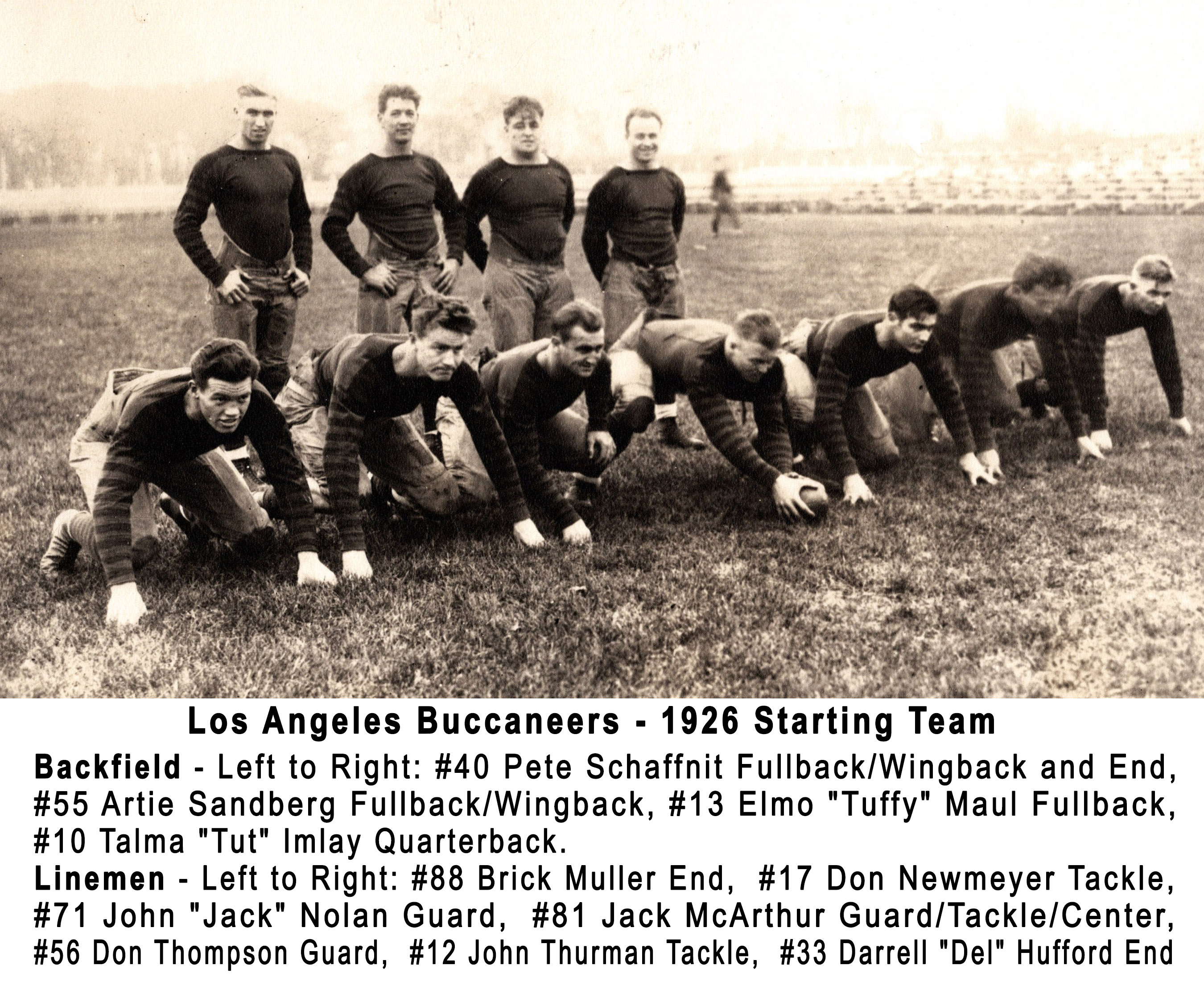

No. 71
- Position: Guard

Personal information
- Born: May 30, 1899; Los Angeles, California, U.S.
- Died: July 15, 1973 (aged 74)
- Listed height: 5 ft 10 in (1.78 m)
- Listed weight: 185 lb (84 kg)

Career information
- High school: Gardena (Los Angeles, California)
- College: Santa Clara

Career history
- Los Angeles Buccaneers (1926)

Awards and highlights
- First-team All-PCC (1924)
- Stats at Pro Football Reference

John Ervin Nolan (May 30, 1899 – July 15, 1973) was a professional football player for the Los Angeles Buccaneers during their only season in the National Football League (NFL) in 1926. He grew up in Los Angeles and graduated from Gardena High School before attending Santa Clara University.
