= 1924 All-Pacific Coast football team =

American all-star college football team

The 1924 All-Pacific Coast Conference football team consists of American football players chosen by various organizations for All-Pacific Coast teams for the 1924 college football season.

== All-Pacific Coast selections ==
=== Quarterback ===
- Skippy Stivers, Idaho (UP-1; PW-2; GV-1)
- Hust Stockton, Gonzaga (PW-1)

=== Halfbacks ===
- Tut Imlay, California (UP-1; PW-1; GV-1)
- Wildcat Wilson, Washington (UP-1; PW-2; GV-1)
- Bill Kelly, Montana (PW-1; GV-2)
- Murray Cuddeback, Stanford (PW-2; GV-2)
- Wes Schulmerich, Oregon Agricultural (GV-2)

=== Fullback ===
- Elmer Tesreau, Washington (UP-1; PW-2; GV-2)
- Red Strader, St. Mary's (PW-1)
- Lynn Jones, Oregon (GV-1)

=== Ends ===
- Hobbs Adams, USC (UP-1; GV-1)
- Jim Lawson, Stanford (UP-1; PW-1; GV-1)
- John Vesser, Idaho (PW-1; GV-2)
- Ted Shipkey, Stanford (PW-2)
- Michael Godett, Occidental (PW-2)
- Robert Mautz, Oregon (GV-2)

=== Tackles ===
- Norman Anderson, USC (UP-1; PW-1; GV-1)
- Fay Thomas, USC (UP-1; PW-2)
- H. Shipkey, Stanford (PW-1; GV-1)
- Hansen, Washington State (PW-2)
- Dick Reed, Oregon (GV-2)
- Edwin Kuhn, Washington (GV-2)

=== Guards ===
- Dana Carey, California (UP-1; GV-1)
- Fred H. Swan, Stanford (UP-1; PW-2)
- John Nolan, Santa Clara (PW-1)
- Verne Bellman, Washington (PW-1; GV-1)
- Walter Rau, California (PW-2)
- Brice Taylor, USC (GV-2)
- Tapper, Idaho (GV-2)

=== Centers ===
- Edwin C. Horrell, California (UP-1; PW-1; GV-1)
- Baker, Stanford (PW-2)
- Chalmers Walters, Washington (GV-2)

== Key ==
UP = United Press

PW = Pop Warner

GV = George Varnell

== See also ==
- 1924 College Football All-America Team
