= Cully Lidberg =

American football player (1900–1987)

No. 17, 34, 38
- Position: Fullback

Personal information
- Born: August 25, 1900; Red Wing, Minnesota
- Died: June 26, 1987 (aged 86); Minneapolis, Minnesota
- Listed height: 5 ft 10 in (1.78 m)
- Listed weight: 191 lb (87 kg)

Career information
- High school: Red Wing (MM)
- College: Hamline; Minnesota

Career history
- Green Bay Packers (1926, 1929–1930)

Awards and highlights
- 2× NFL champion (1929, 1930); First-team All-Big Ten (1924)

Career NFL statistics
- Games played: 26
- Games started: 15
- Touchdowns: 7
- Stats at Pro Football Reference

Carl Leroy "Cully" Lidberg (August 25, 1900 – June 26, 1987) was an American football fullback for the Green Bay Packers of the National Football League (NFL). He played college football for Hamline and Minnesota.

== Biography ==
Lidberg was born on August 25, 1900, in Red Wing, Minnesota. He attended Red Wing High School in Red Wing. He played college football for Hamline and Minnesota before playing three seasons for the Green Bay Packers of the National Football League (NFL). He won league championships in 1929 and 1930. He died on June 26, 1987, in Minneapolis, Minnesota.
