= Bill Gutteron =

American football player (1899–1987)

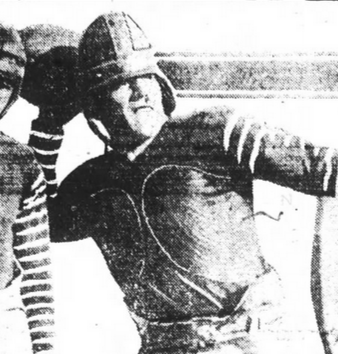
- Gutteron, c. 1925

Profile
- Position: Quarterback

Personal information
- Born: November 26, 1899; British Honduras
- Died: May 30, 1987 (aged 87); Middleton, Wisconsin, U.S.
- Listed height: 5 ft 5 in (1.65 m)
- Listed weight: 155 lb (70 kg)

Career information
- High school: San Diego (San Diego, California, U.S.)
- College: Nevada (1921–1925)

Career history

Playing
- Los Angeles Buccaneers (1926)

Coaching
- San Diego Army and Navy Academy (c. 1920) Coach; Alhambra High School (1927) Assistant coach; San Diego High School (1928–?) Head coach; Bellefonte Academy (1931–1935) Head coach / athletic director; Muhlenberg (1935–1936) Backfield coach / baseball coach; Clearfield High School (1937–1943) Football / basketball coach; Penn State (1947–1951) Swimming coach

Career statistics
- Games played: 2
- Stats at Pro Football Reference

William Alexander Gutteron (November 26, 1899 – May 30, 1987) was a Belizean-born American professional football player and coach. After moving to the U.S. from what was then British Honduras, he played college football as a quarterback for the Nevada Sagebrushers. He then played one season for the Los Angeles Buccaneers of the National Football League (NFL) in 1926. After his playing career, Gutteron served as a coach in multiple sports. He worked from 1943 to 1965 at Penn State University as a swimming teacher.

== Early life ==
William Alexander Gutteron was born on November 26, 1899, in British Honduras, now Belize. The youngest of 13 children, he later moved to the U.S., where he attended San Diego High School in California. At San Diego High School, he played football as a quarterback. He then served as a coach at the San Diego Army and Navy Academy before attending the University of Nevada from 1921 to 1925.

Gutteron played multiple sports at Nevada and received a total of 12 varsity letters in college. He was a four-time letterman in football and served as the team's starting quarterback from 1922 to 1925. In addition to football, Gutteron also competed in baseball and swimming, becoming Nevada's first player to win 12 letters. Standing at 5 feet 5 inches (1.65 m) and weighing 155 pounds (70 kg), he was nicknamed "Little Bill" or the "Little Giant". In the 1923 season, he quarterbacked and captained a Nevada team that faced off against the heavily favored and undefeated California Golden Bears, who were known as the "Wonder Team" and ultimately won that year's national championship. Gutteron led Nevada to an "outstanding performance" and a 0–0 tie against the Golden Bears, which was the only time the "Wonder Team" did not score during the season as well as the only game they did not win. Gutteron nearly scored a touchdown in the game, but was tackled shortly before the end zone and fractured his leg. He remained with Nevada in 1924 and 1925, though he missed part of the latter season after breaking his leg again. According to the Nevada State Journal, Gutteron was regarded as one of the best quarterbacks on the Pacific coast during his collegiate career.

== Professional career ==
In August 1926, Gutteron signed to play professional football for the Los Angeles Buccaneers of the National Football League (NFL), run by Harold Muller. He appeared in two games for the Buccaneers, one as a starter, at quarterback. He became the NFL's first Belizean-born player, and remains one of only two as of 2025. However, he had been released by the start of November due to being "too small for the big league stuff of the east".

== Coaching career and later life ==
Gutteron opened a cafe in Venice, Los Angeles, in 1927. That year, he also worked as an assistant coach at Alhambra High School, before becoming head coach at San Diego High School in 1928. In 1931, he became athletic director at Bellefonte Academy in Pennsylvania. There, he coached football, basketball, baseball and boxing. He worked at Bellefonte from 1931 to 1935 until the school went bankrupt. Afterwards, he was hired by Muhlenberg College in 1935 and served as the football team's backfield coach. He also served as head coach of the baseball team.

Gutteron joined Clearfield High School in 1937 and served until 1943 as football and basketball coach. His 1939 football team was undefeated until the last game of the season. During World War II, he was asked by Penn State University to supervise a water survival program. He started working on Penn State's faculty in 1943 and while there, earned a master's degree in 1948. He was one of the organizers for an instructional program at a local pool in 1946; he served as manager and later general supervisor for the program, which had taught swimming classes to around 15,000 youth by 1963. Gutteron served as the head coach of Penn State's swimming team from 1947 until it was discontinued in 1951, then remained teaching swimming there until retiring in 1965. According to the Centre Daily Times, Gutteron estimated that he helped over 50,000 youth learn how to swim.

Gutteron returned to California in 1973, moving to Oceanside. He received an award from the Pennsylvania Swimming Hall of Fame in 1975 honoring his service. He later moved to Wisconsin in 1982. He was married and had a son who served as a pilot. Gutteron suffered from Parkinson's disease in his last years and died in Middleton, Wisconsin, on May 30, 1987, at the age of 87.
