= Tut Imlay =

American football player and coach (1902–1962)

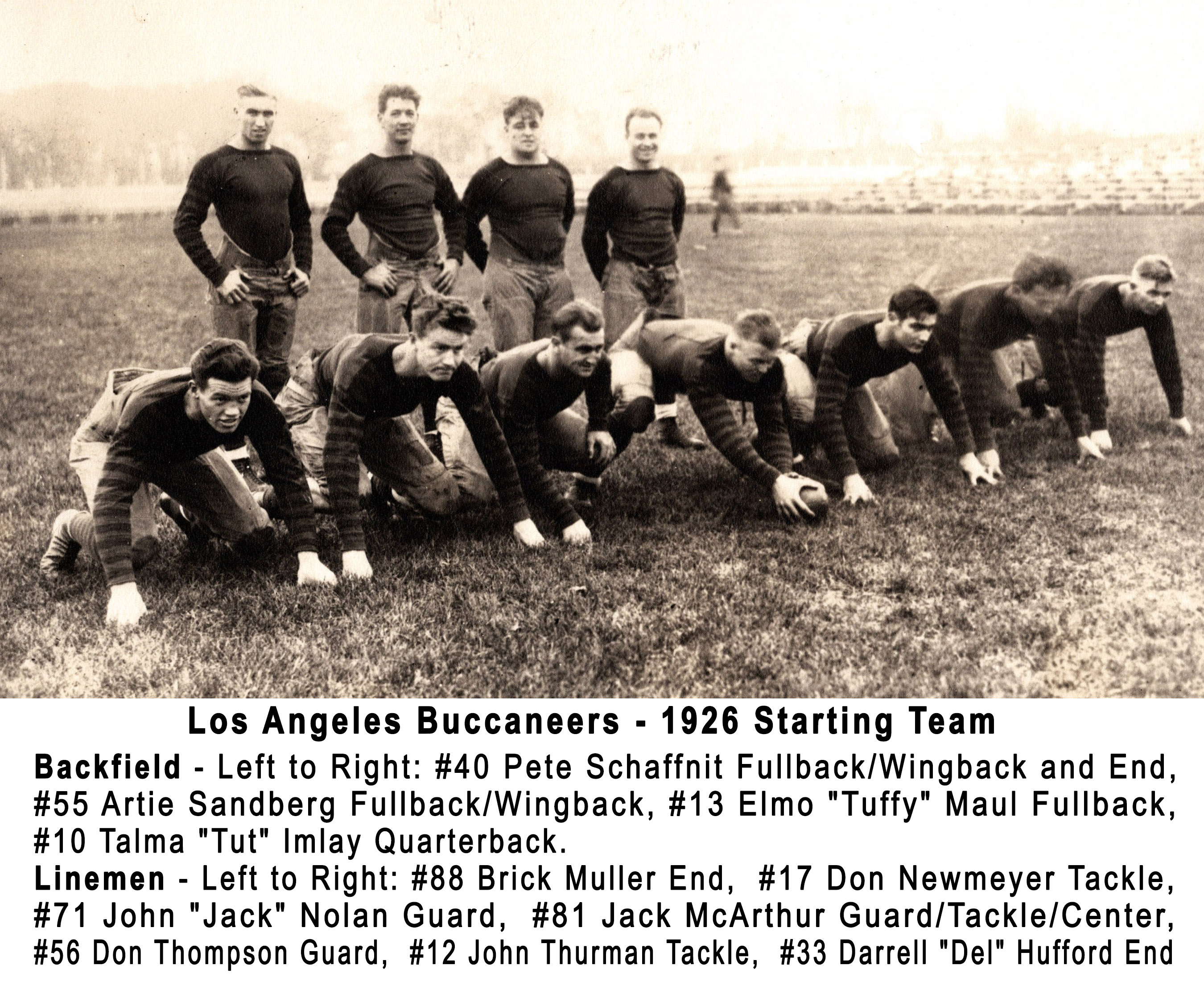

No. 10
- Positions: Fullback, Halfback, Quarterback

Personal information
- Born: March 20, 1902; Panguitch, Utah, U.S.
- Died: March 20, 1976 (aged 74); Pebble Beach, California, U.S.
- Listed height: 5 ft 8 in (1.73 m)
- Listed weight: 165 lb (75 kg)

Career information
- College: California

Career history

Playing
- 1926: Los Angeles Buccaneers
- 1927: New York Giants

Coaching
- 1926: Los Angeles Buccaneers

Awards and highlights
- NFL champion (1927); 1st team all-NFL GB Press-Gazette (1926); Third-team All-American (1924); First-team All-PCC (1924); Second-team All-PCC (1925); Coaching record: 6–3–1
- Coaching profile at Pro Football Reference
- Stats at Pro Football Reference

Talma W. "Tut" Imlay (March 20, 1902 – March 20, 1976) was an American football player who played two seasons in the National Football League (NFL) in 1926 and in 1927. During those two years, Tut played for the Los Angeles Buccaneers and the New York Giants. In 1927, Tut won an NFL Championship with the Giants. In 1926, Imlay earned 1st Team All-NFL honors by the Green Bay Press-Gazette.

== Early career ==
Imlay attended Salinas High School in 1920 where he played for the school's first football team that played by American rules. In 2013, he was inducted into the Salinas Valley Sports Hall of Fame.

== College football ==
Tut played college football at the University of California. In 1925 he was named the captain of the Golden Bears football team. While in college, Imlay once tossed a football to teammate Harold Muller from the top of a 415-foot building in San Francisco. On December 26, 1925, the first touchdown scored in East–West Shrine Game history was a 27-yard pass by Imlay to Brick Muller, which turned out to be the only points scored in the inaugural game, resulting in a 6–0 West victory. It was the only touchdown pass Imlay ever threw in a football game.

== Pro football ==
In 1926, the NFL established a traveling team in California, called the Los Angeles Buccaneers. The Bucs played all their games on the road, and ran out of Chicago. Brick Muller and Tut were then named the team's co-head coaches. Muller and Imlay both not only coached the team and also played for the Bucs. L.A. finished the 1926 season with a record of 6–3–1. After the 1926 season, he left Muller and the Bucs and joined the New York Giants. The Buccaneers folded shortly afterwards, while the Giants went on to win the 1927 NFL Championship.
