= Artie Sandberg =

American football player (1899–1970)

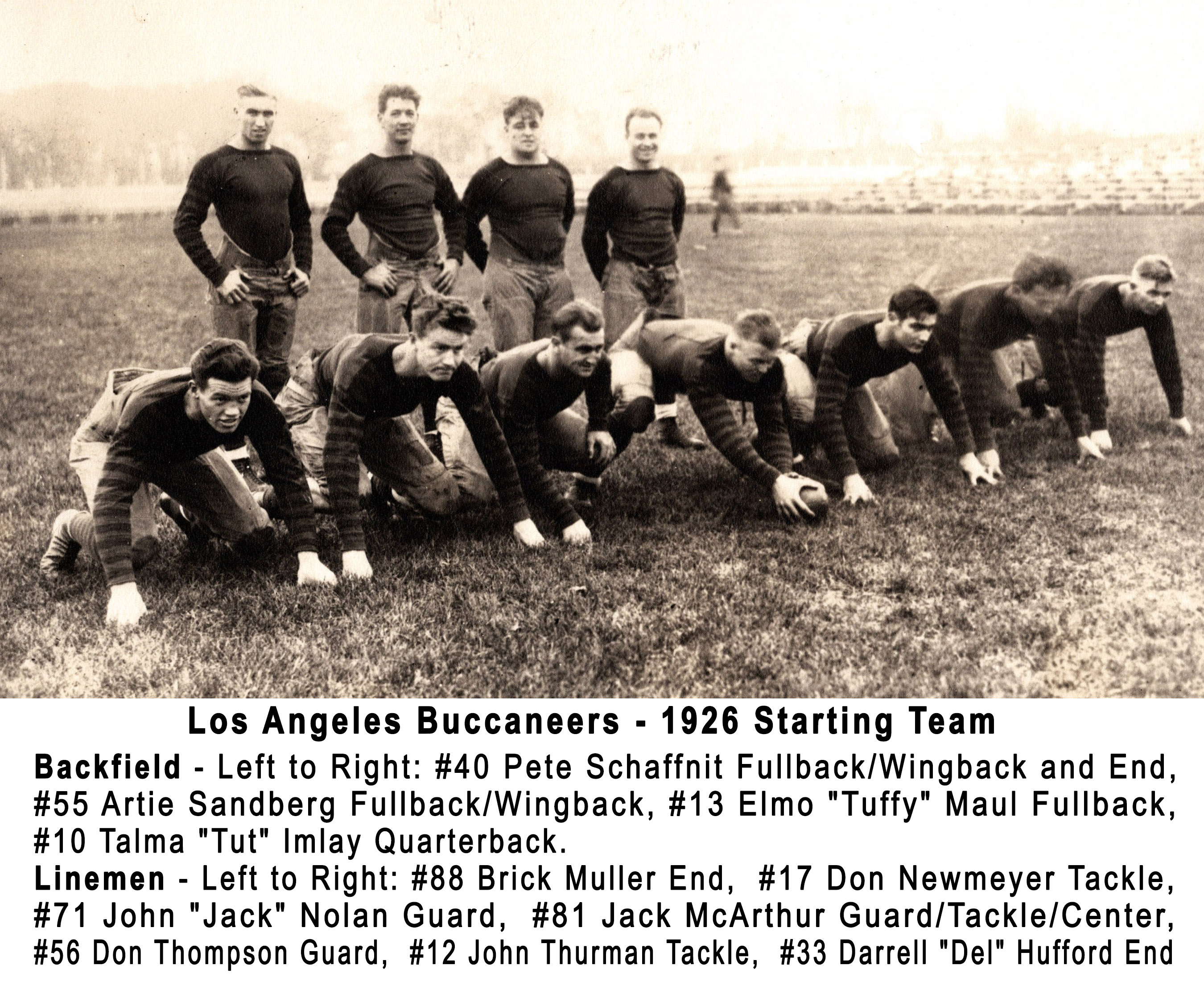

No. 55, (1925), 28(1929)
- Positions: Halfback, quarterback

Personal information
- Born: September 19, 1899; Minnesota, U.S.
- Died: June 3, 1970 (aged 70)
- Listed weight: 192 lb (87 kg)

Career information
- College: None

Career history
- Los Angeles Buccaneers (1926); Minneapolis Red Jackets (1929)
- Stats at Pro Football Reference

Arthur Clarence Sandberg (September 19, 1899 – June 3, 1970) was a professional football player in the National Football League. He made his NFL debut in 1926 with the Los Angeles Buccaneers. He returned to NFL in 1929 and played for the Minneapolis Red Jackets.
