= Ed McGinley =

American football player and coach (1899–1985)

No. 10
- Position: Tackle

Personal information
- Born: August 9, 1899; Swarthmore, Pennsylvania, U.S.
- Died: April 16, 1985 (aged 85); Point Pleasant, New Jersey, U.S.
- Listed height: 5 ft 11 in (1.80 m)
- Listed weight: 185 lb (84 kg)

Career information
- High school: Swarthmore (Swarthmore, Pennsylvania)
- College: Penn

Career history

Playing
- New York Giants (1925)

Coaching
- Saint Joseph's (1925) (Head coach)

Awards and highlights
- Consensus All-American (1924)
- College Football Hall of Fame

Edward Francis McGinley Jr. (August 9, 1899 – April 16, 1985) was an American football player and coach. He played college football as a tackle at the University of Pennsylvania and professionally for one season, in 1925, with the New York Giants of the National Football League (NFL). McGinley also served as the head football coach at Saint Joseph's College—now known as Saint Joseph's University—in Philadelphia in 1925. He was inducted into the College Football Hall of Fame as a player in 1979.

== Head coaching record ==
Year	Team	Overall	Conference	Standing	Bowl/playoffs
Saint Joseph's Hawks (Independent) (1925)
1925	Saint Joseph's	3–4			
Saint Joseph's:		3–4			
Total:		3–4			
