= Charles Darling (American football) =

American football quarterback and fullback

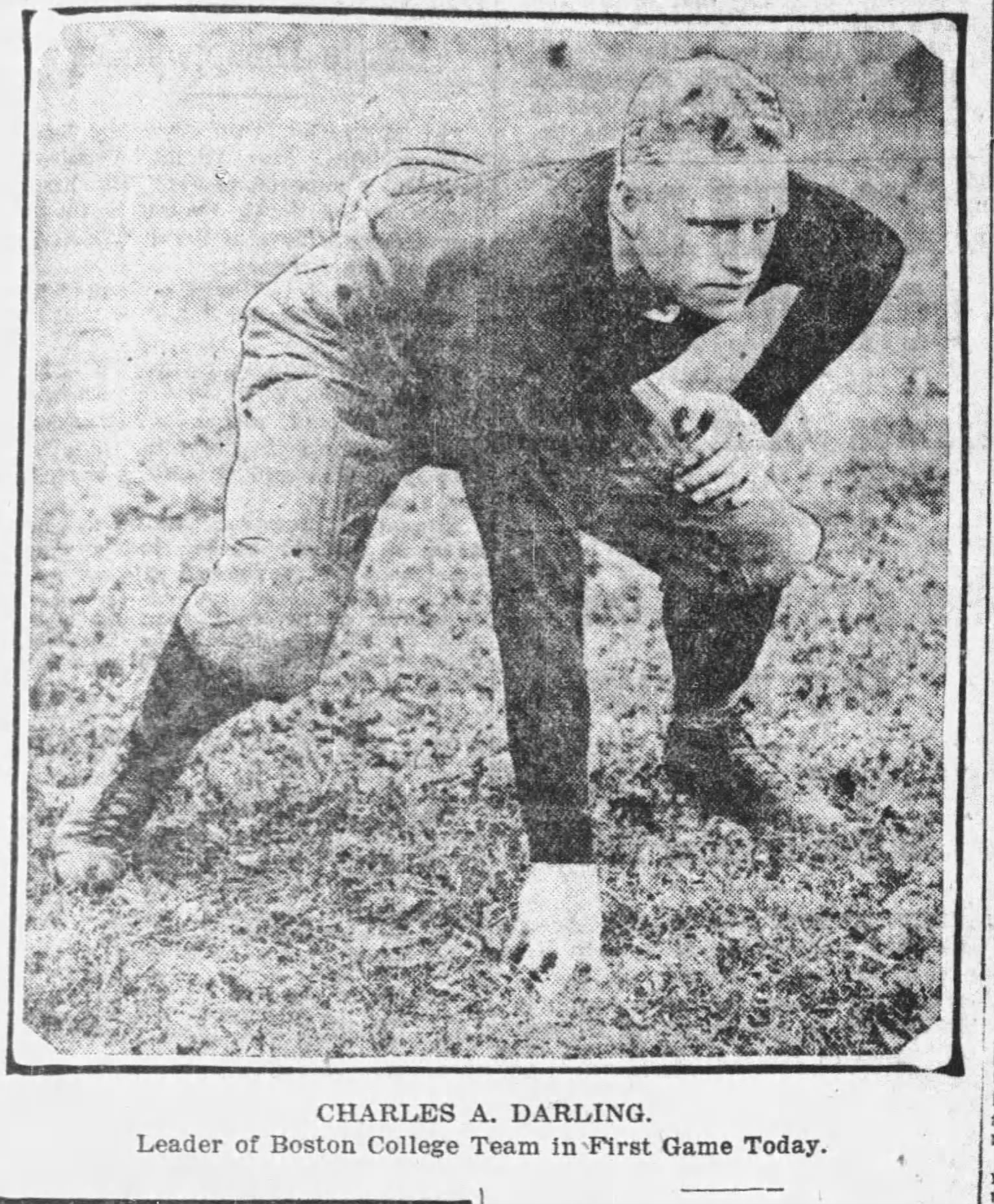

No. 30
- Position: Quarterback / Fullback

Career information
- College: Boston College (1921–1924)

Awards and highlights
- First-team All-American (1924)

Charles Darling was a college football and baseball player for the Boston College Eagles. A triple threat, he played quarterback and fullback on the football team. Darling was captain of the 1923 team. Darling made various All-American selections.
