= Los Angeles Buccaneers =

1926 National Football League team

Logo

General information
- Founded: 1926
- Folded: 1927
- Stadium: Traveling team
- Headquartered: Los Angeles, California, United States (nominally)
- Colors: Orange, black, white

Personnel
- Head coach: Tut Imlay (1926); Brick Muller (1926–1927)

Team history
- Los Angeles Buccaneers (1926–1927)

League / conference affiliations
- National Football League

The Los Angeles Buccaneers were a traveling team in the National Football League (NFL) during the 1926 season, ostensibly representing the city of Los Angeles, California. Like the Los Angeles Wildcats of the first American Football League, the team never actually played a league game in Los Angeles. It was operated out of Chicago with players from California colleges (or who grew up in California).

The historian Michael McCambridge has stated that the Buccaneers originally planned to play in the Los Angeles Memorial Coliseum, and became a road team only after the Coliseum Commission refused to allow professional teams to play there. The difficulty of transcontinental travel in the era before modern air travel, though, must have been a major factor in the decision to base the team in the Midwest, especially considering numerous other stadiums were large enough to accommodate an NFL team (the Rose Bowl and Wrigley Field of Los Angeles being among them), had the league desired to pursue that route. Despite being rejected by the Coliseum, the Buccaneers did play two true home games in Los Angeles, both of them exhibition games against the AFL's New York Yankees in January 1927. The Buccaneers also played two games in San Francisco, including the last game of the Buccaneers' existence, an exhibition game against the Wildcats, with the Buccaneers being shut out, 17–0, on January 23, 1927. Because of this, the NFL officially considers the team's home city to be Los Angeles.

== Season-by-season ==
Year	W	L	T	Finish	Coach
1926	6	3	1	6th	Tut Imlay, Brick Muller

== Roster ==
Los Angeles Buccaneers 1926 roster
Quarterbacks
- 10 Tut Imlay

Running backs

- -- Ben Bangs WB
- 18 Bull Finch FB
- -- Bill Gutteron FB
- 13 Tuffy Maul FB
- 55 Artie Sandberg FB/WB
- 40 Pete Schaffnit FB/WB
- 74 Ellery White FB/WB
- 16 Al Young FB/WB

Ends

- 33 Del Hufford
- 88 Brick Muller
- 40 Pete Schaffnit

Linemen

- -- Juddy Ash G
- 21 Fred Beach G
- 81 Jack McArthur G/T/C
- 17 Don Newmeyer T
- 71 John Nolan G
- 56 Don Thompson G
- 12 John Thurman T

== All-time record ==
Opponent	W	L	T	PF	PA
Brooklyn Lions	1	0	0	20	0
Canton Bulldogs	1	0	0	16	13
Detroit Panthers	1	0	0	9	6
Milwaukee Badgers	1	0	0	6	0
New York Giants	1	0	0	6	0
Providence Steam Roller	1	0	0	7	6
Buffalo Rangers	0	0	1	0	0
Chicago Cardinals	0	1	0	0	15
Kansas City Blues	0	1	0	3	7
Pottsville Maroons	0	1	0	0	10
