= Hilary Mahaney =

American football player and coach (1902–1969)

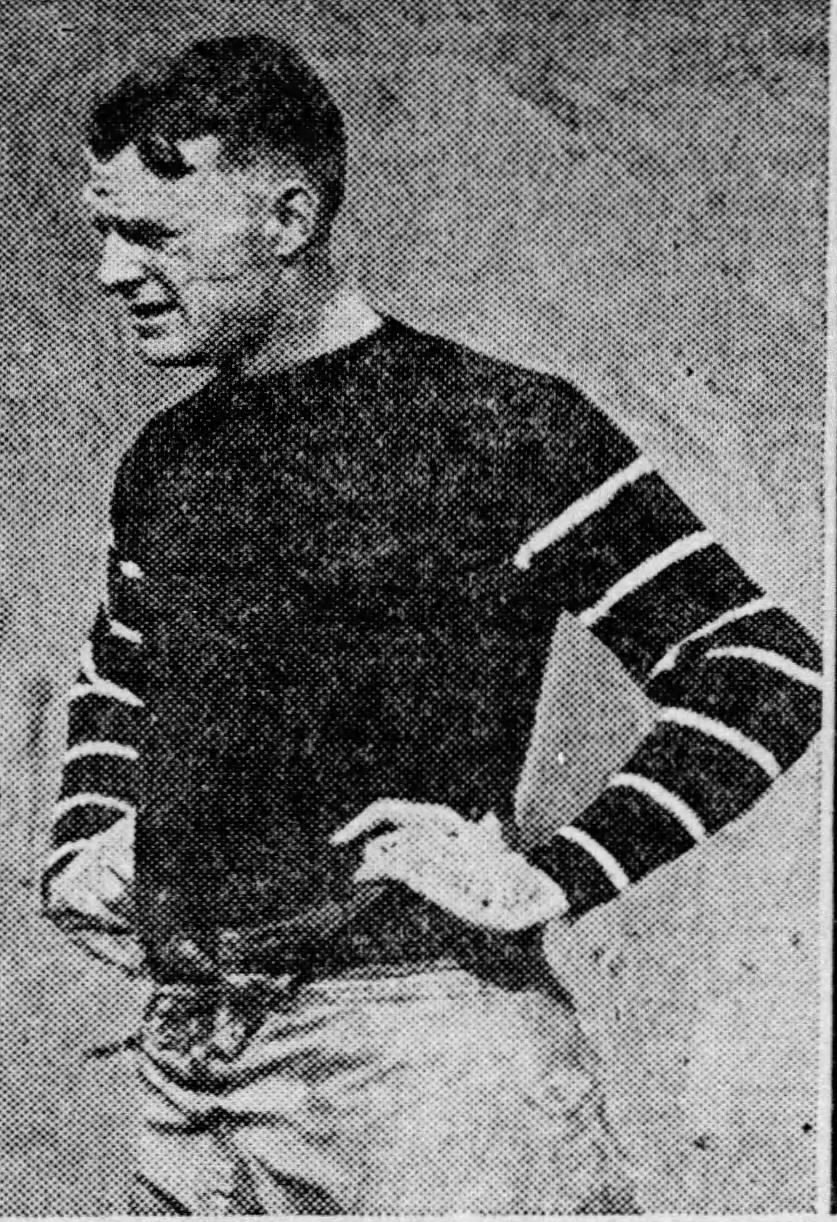
- Mahaney in 1925

Biographical details
- Born: February 17, 1902; Biddeford, Maine, U.S.
- Died: August 30, 1969 (aged 67); Saco, Maine, U.S.

Playing career
- 1921–1924: Holy Cross
- Position: End

Coaching career (HC unless noted)
- 1925–1929: Boston University (line)
- 1930–1931: Boston University

Head coaching record
- Overall: 3–14–1

Accomplishments and honors

Awards
- First-team All-American (1924)

Hilary F. Mahaney Sr. (February 17, 1902 – August 30, 1969) was an American college football player and coach and jurist. He played end for Holy Cross from 1921 to 1924, served as the head football coach at Boston University from 1930 to 1931, and was a judge in Maine from 1955 to 1965.

== Early life ==
A native of Biddeford, Maine, Mahaney attended Thornton Academy, where he captained the school to a state football championship. He was a four-year starter and three-time all-conference selection for Holy Cross from 1921 to 1924. He was selected as an All-American end after his senior season of 1924. He served as team captain his senior season. He was also a member of the school's track team.

== Coaching career ==
In 1925, Mahaney joined Charles Whelan's coaching staff at Boston University, where he also attended law school. He was retained when Edward N. Robinson and Reggie Brown took over the program in 1926. In 1930 he was promoted to head coach. He was let go after the 1931 season.

== Legal career ==
Mahaney graduated from Boston University School of Law in 1928 and practiced law in Biddeford. In 1931 he was named city solicitor of Saco, Maine. In 1950 he was the Democratic nominee for mayor of Saco. From 1955 to 1965 he was a judge of the Saco municipal court. He died on August 30, 1969, in Saco.

== Head coaching record ==
Year	Team	Overall	Conference	Standing	Bowl/playoffs
Boston University Pioneers (Independent) (1930–1931)
1930	Boston University	1–7–1			
1931	Boston University	2–7			
Boston University:		3–14–1			
Total:		3–14–1			
