= Henry Bjorkman =

American football player, coach, and businessman (1901–1974)

Biographical details
- Born: October 29, 1901; Waltham, Massachusetts, U.S.
- Died: August 9, 1974 (aged 72); New York, New York, U.S.

Playing career
- 1922–1924: Dartmouth
- Position: End

Coaching career (HC unless noted)
- 1925–1926: Georgia Tech (assistant)

Accomplishments and honors

Awards
- First-team All-American (1924)

Henry Bjorkman (October 29, 1901 – August 9, 1974) was an American football player and coach and businessman. He was selected as a first-team All-American football player in 1924. He later became a partner in the Wall Street firm of Spencer Trask & Company.

== Athletic career ==
Bjorkman was born in Waltham, Massachusetts, the son of Swedish immigrants, the Swedish spelling of the surname being Björkman. He attended Dartmouth College where he played for the Dartmouth Big Green baseball and football teams. He was captain of baseball team and he played end for the football team. He was selected by Walter Camp, Walter Eckersall and Liberty magazine as a first-team end on the 1924 College Football All-America Team.

== Coaching and later years ==
After graduating from Dartmouth in 1925, Bjorkman served for two years as an assistant football coach under Bill Alexander at Georgia Tech.

Bjorkman later worked in the stock brokerage business and became a partner in the Wall Street firm Spencer Trask & Company. During World War II, he served as an intelligence officer in the United States Army Air Forces, holding the rank of major. Bjorkman was married to Elizabeth Cutler, and they had a son, Henry C. Bjorkman. Starting in 1949, Bjorkman rented a shop near his home on East 88th Street in Manhattan, where he made thousands of hand-crafted and inscribed bats as gifts for boys in orphanages and corrective farms. Bjorkman died in 1974 at age 73.
