= Clarence Schutte =

American football player and coach (1901–1970)

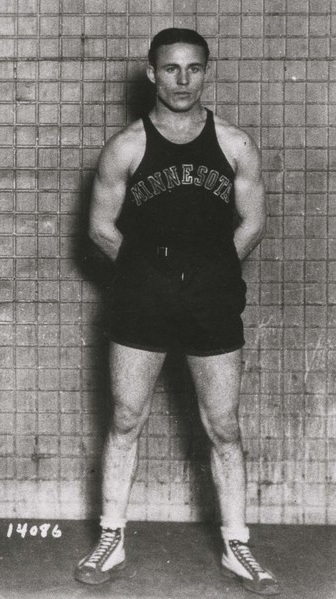
- Schutte, 1924

Biographical details
- Born: April 6, 1901; Hecla, South Dakota, U.S.
- Died: November 5, 1970 (aged 69); Los Angeles, U.S.

Playing career
- 1921–1922: South Dakota State
- 1924: Minnesota
- Position: Halfback

Coaching career (HC unless noted)
- 1925–1941: Santa Barbara HS (CA)
- 1946–1950: Santa Barbara HS (CA)

Head coaching record
- Overall: 173–45–12

Accomplishments and honors

Awards
- Second-team All-American, 1924

Clarence Henry Schutte (pronounced /ˈʃuːti/ SHOO-tee; April 6, 1901 – November 5, 1970) was an American football player and coach. He played college football at Northern Normal and Industrial School, South Dakota State University and the University of Minnesota. In 1924, he became known as "the man who stopped Red Grange" when he led Minnesota to a 20–7 win over Grange's Illinois team. Schutte scored all three touchdowns for Minnesota and rushed for 282 yards in the game. He was the head football coach at Santa Barbara High School from 1925 to 1941 and 1946 to 1950. He led Santa Barbara to three California Interscholastic Federation (CIF) championships and compiled an overall record of 173–45–12. The athletes he coached include baseball player Eddie Mathews and pro golfer Al Geiberger. In 1951, he became athletic director at Santa Barbara High School. Schutte and his wife were friends with Sarah and Max Fleischmann, heirs to the Fleischmann's yeast fortune. When Mrs. Fleischmann died in 1960, Schutte and his wife were bequeathed $100,000. Schutte died in November 1970 at age 69 in a Los Angeles hospital.
