= Richard Luman =

American football and basketball player (1900–1973)

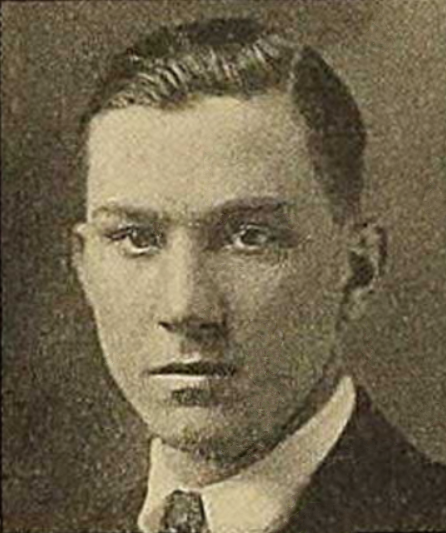
- Luman from 1925 Yale Banner & Pot Pourri

Yale Bulldogs
- Position: End

Personal information
- Born: April 26, 1900; Wyoming, US
- Died: April 26, 1973 (aged 73); Houston, Texas, US

Career information
- College: Yale (1924)

Awards and highlights
- Consensus All-American (1924); Third-team All-American (1923)

Richard John Luman (April 26, 1900 – April 26, 1973) was an American football and basketball player. He played college football for Yale University and was a consensus selection at the end position on the 1924 College Football All-America Team.

Luman was raised in Pinedale, Wyoming, and attended preparatory school at Phillips Exeter Academy. He attended college at Yale University, where he was a member of the football and basketball teams. As an end for the Yale Bulldogs football team, he was a consensus first-team All-American. In basketball, he played at the center position and was selected as the captain of the 1924–25 Yale basketball team.

He died in 1973.
