= Johnny Joss =

American football player (1902–1955)

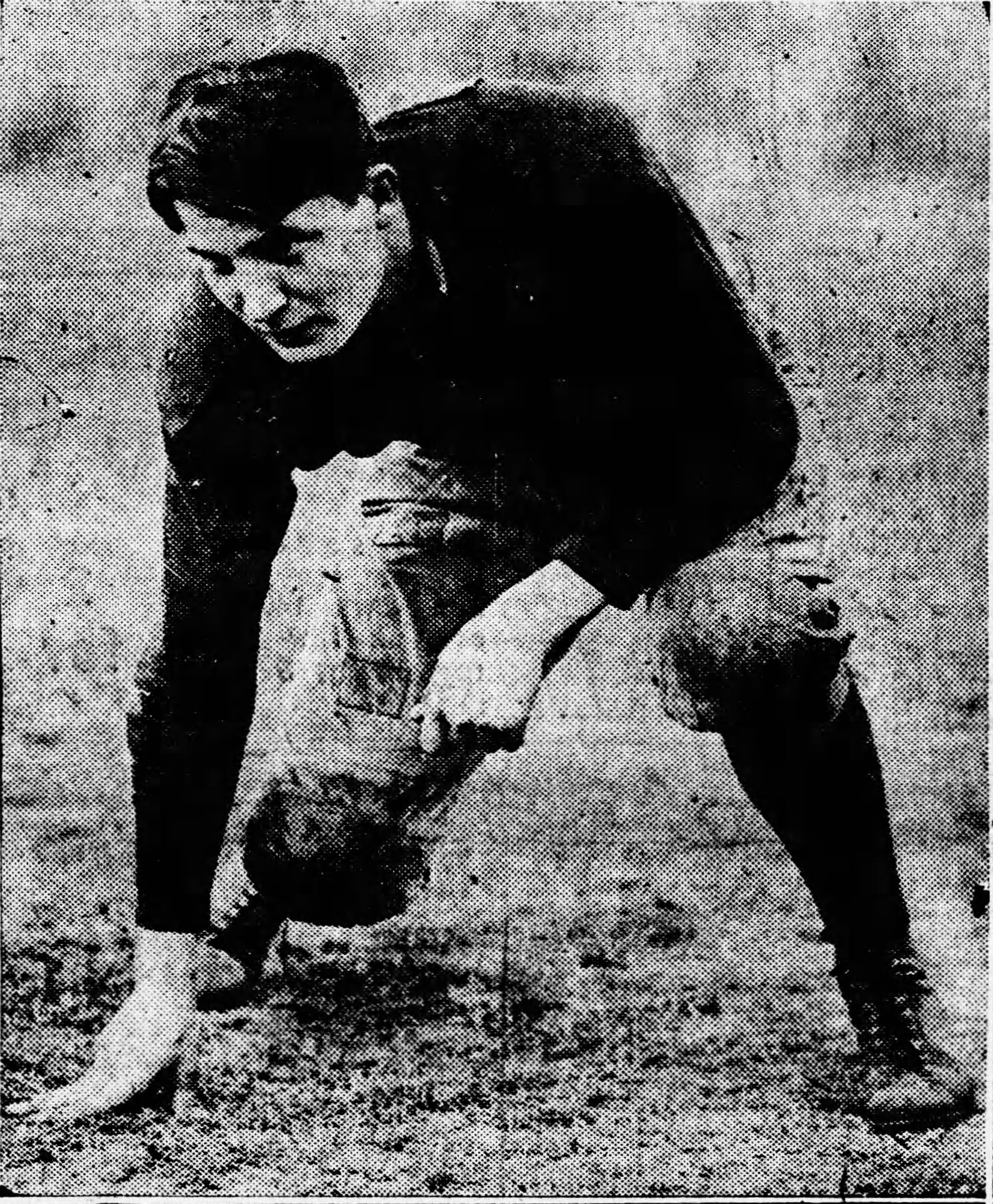
- John Hubbard Joss, 1925

Profile
- Position: Tackle

Personal information
- Born: March 18, 1902; Indianapolis, Indiana, U.S.
- Died: March 22, 1955 (aged 53); Washington, D.C.
- Listed height: 6 ft 3.5 in (1.92 m)
- Listed weight: 195 lb (88 kg)

Career information
- College: Yale

Career history
- UNAM (1932) Head coach

Awards and highlights
- First-team All-American (1925)

John Hubbard Joss (March 18, 1902 – March 22, 1955) was an American football player, lawyer, and government official.

== Early life ==
Joss was born in Indianapolis in 1902. He attended the Taft School in Connecticut before enrolling at Yale College.

== Athletic career ==
He played college football at the tackle position for the Yale Bulldogs football team. He was described as "the backbone of the rush line on defense", "unusually agile for his size", and "one of the outstanding tackles."

He was selected in February 1925 as the captain of the 1925 Yale Bulldogs football team. He was also selected by Lawrence Perry as a first-team player on the 1924 All-American college football team, and by Liberty magazine and the New York Sun as a first-team player on the 1925 All-American college football team.

== Later life ==
Joss moved to Tucson, Arizona, around 1928 to study at the University of Arizona College of Law, and began to gain prominence as at state and regional golf events. He moved to Mexico City in the early 1930s and competed for the amateur golf championship of Mexico in 1931. Joss served as the head coach of the National Autonomous University of Mexico football team in 1932.

Joss was married in 1931 to Eleanor Taylor. Joss received law degrees from the University of Arizona and George Washington University. He practiced law and served for a time as assistant general counsel of the Firestone Rubber Company. During World War II, he worked for the Office of Price Administration as chief counsel for rationing enforcement. He also represented the Economic Warfare Board in British East Africa. After the war, he became chief counsel for the War Asset Administration. He joined the General Services Administration upon it formation in 1949. He was appointed by Harry Truman to the Renegotiations Board and served as its chairman.

== Death ==
Joss died in 1955 at his home in Washington, D.C.
