= Heinie Benkert =

American football player (1901–1972)

No. 2, C
- Position: Running back

Personal information
- Born: June 30, 1901; Newark, New Jersey, U.S.
- Died: July 15, 1972 (aged 71); Orange, New Jersey, U.S.
- Listed height: 5 ft 9 in (1.75 m)
- Listed weight: 168 lb (76 kg)

Career information
- High school: East Side (Newark)
- College: Rutgers

Career history
- New York Giants (1925); Pottsville Maroons (1926); Orange/Newark Tornadoes (1929–1930)
- Stats at Pro Football Reference

Henry Marvin "Heinie" Benkert (June 30, 1901 – July 15, 1972) was an American professional football running back. He played college football for the Rutgers Scarlet Knights, where he won the unofficial collegiate scoring crown as a senior, and played for four non-consecutive seasons in the National Football League (NFL), for the New York Giants, the Pottsville Maroons and the Orange/Newark Tornadoes.

== Early life ==
Born and raised in Newark, New Jersey, Benkert received all-state honors at football while attending East Side High School in his hometown, before going on to play for the Rutgers University football team.

== College career ==
Benkert, with 16 touchdowns and four extra points for the 1924 Rutgers Queensmen football team, he led the nation's college football players in scoring, with a total of 100 points; his 16 touchdowns also led the nation. His 1924 season included an October 4 game against Lebanon Valley College, won 56–0 by Rutgers, in which Benkert scored four touchdowns and kicked three extra points, scoring one of his touchdowns on an 86-yard run. Benkert gained a total of 2,124 rushing yards in his three collegiate seasons from 1922 to 1924, making him the first Rutgers player to cross the 2,000-yard mark.

== Professional career ==
=== New York Giants ===
After college, Benkert went professional, playing in the NFL for the New York Giants team that finished the season with an 8–4 record in its inaugural season in 1925, starting 10 of the team's 12 NFL games – typical of the less-regimented early barnstorming days in the league, the team played five games against non-league opponents—and earning recognition as a first-team All-Pro by Collyer's Eye for his play that year.

=== Pottsville Maroons ===
He played for the Pottsville Maroons in the 1926 season, starting four games and appearing in eight as the team finished with a 10–2–2 record, good for third place in the league.

=== Orange/Newark Tornadoes ===
In 1929 and 1930, Benkert played in New Jersey for the Tornadoes (the team moved from Orange to Newark in 1930), appearing in 13 games in his two seasons with the Tornadoes and also serving as a coach for a team that finished 3–5–4 in 1929 (in eighth place in the NFL among 12 teams) and 1–10–1 in 1930 (good for 11th, and last, place in the league). Characteristic of the experimental nature of the early National Football League, the Tornadoes experimented with using letters instead of numbers on player jerseys in the 1929 season; Benkert wore the letter "C" on his uniform in a game against the Frankford Yellow Jackets, while Johnny Tomaini had the letter "X" on his jersey.

== Post-playing career ==
After finishing his professional football career, Benkert went on to teach history and coach football at Orange High School in Orange, New Jersey, until his retirement from the school in 1971. He was a member of the football coaching staff at Rutgers in the 1940s.

== See also ==
- List of NCAA major college football yearly scoring leaders
