= 1937 Pittsburgh Panthers football team =

American college football season

1937 Pittsburgh Panthers football

AP Poll national champion Eastern champion
- Conference: Independent

Ranking
- AP: No. 1
- Record: 9–0–1
- Head coach: Jock Sutherland (14th season)
- Offensive scheme: Single-wing
- Home stadium: Pitt Stadium

1937 Eastern college football independents records
| | Conf. | | | Overall |
| Team | W | L | T | W | | L | | T |
|---|---|---|---|---|---|---|---|---|
| No. 1 Pittsburgh | | – | | 9 | – | 0 | – | 1 |
| No. 6 Villanova | | – | | 8 | – | 0 | – | 1 |
| No. 3 Fordham | | – | | 7 | – | 0 | – | 1 |
| No. 7 Dartmouth | | – | | 7 | – | 0 | – | 2 |
| No. T–14 Holy Cross | | – | | 8 | – | 0 | – | 2 |
| St. Thomas (PA) | | – | | 6 | – | 1 | – | 1 |
| No. 12 Yale | | – | | 6 | – | 1 | – | 1 |
| Army | | – | | 7 | – | 2 | – | 0 |
| Boston University | | – | | 6 | – | 2 | – | 0 |
| Cornell | | – | | 5 | – | 2 | – | 1 |
| Harvard | | – | | 5 | – | 2 | – | 1 |
| Syracuse | | – | | 5 | – | 2 | – | 1 |
| CCNY | | – | | 5 | – | 2 | – | 0 |
| No. 12 Manhattan | | – | | 6 | – | 3 | – | 1 |
| Penn State | | – | | 5 | – | 3 | – | 0 |
| Duquesne | | – | | 6 | – | 4 | – | 0 |
| Brown | | – | | 5 | – | 4 | – | 0 |
| NYU | | – | | 5 | – | 4 | – | 0 |
| Temple | | – | | 3 | – | 2 | – | 4 |
| Boston College | | – | | 4 | – | 4 | – | 1 |
| Bucknell | | – | | 3 | – | 3 | – | 2 |
| Buffalo | | – | | 4 | – | 4 | – | 0 |
| Princeton | | – | | 4 | – | 4 | – | 0 |
| Tufts | | – | | 3 | – | 4 | – | 1 |
| Colgate | | – | | 3 | – | 5 | – | 0 |
| Columbia | | – | | 2 | – | 5 | – | 2 |
| Hofstra | | – | | 2 | – | 4 | – | 0 |
| Carnegie Tech | | – | | 2 | – | 5 | – | 1 |
| Penn | | – | | 2 | – | 5 | – | 1 |
| Providence | | – | | 2 | – | 6 | – | 0 |
| Vermont | | – | | 2 | – | 6 | – | 0 |
| La Salle | | – | | 2 | – | 7 | – | 0 |
| Massachusetts State | | – | | 1 | – | 7 | – | 1 |
Rankings from AP Poll

The 1937 Pittsburgh Panthers football team represented the University of Pittsburgh as an independent during the 1937 college football season. In its 14th season under head coach Jock Sutherland, the team compiled a 9–0–1 record, shut out six of its ten opponents, and outscored all opponents by a total of 203 to 34. The team played its home games at Pitt Stadium in Pittsburgh. The Panthers were crowned national champions by the final AP poll, which was released in late November, and by most NCAA-designated major selectors.

Pitt was also awarded the Lambert-Meadowlands Trophy as the champion of the East. An invitation to the Rose Bowl on New Year's Day was declined.

== Schedule ==
| Date | Opponent | Rank | Site | Result | Attendance | Source |
|---|---|---|---|---|---|---|
| September 24 | Ohio Wesleyan | | Pitt Stadium; Pittsburgh, PA | W 59–0 | 19,500 | |
| October 2 | at West Virginia | | Mountaineer Field; Morgantown, WV (rivalry) | W 20–0 | 18,000 | |
| October 9 | Duquesne | | Pitt Stadium; Pittsburgh, PA | W 6–0 | 55,000 | |
| October 16 | at Fordham | | Polo Grounds; New York, NY | T 0–0 | 52,000 | |
| October 23 | No. 16 Wisconsin^{†} | No. 3 | Pitt Stadium; Pittsburgh, PA | W 21–0 | 31,200 | |
| October 30 | Carnegie Tech | No. 2 | Pitt Stadium; Pittsburgh, PA | W 25–14 | 37,500 | |
| November 6 | at No. 12 Notre Dame | No. 3 | Notre Dame Stadium; Notre Dame, IN | W 21–6 | 54,309–56,000 | |
| November 13 | No. 11 Nebraska | No. 1 | Pitt Stadium; Pittsburgh, PA | W 13–7 | 71,267 | |
| November 20 | Penn State | No. 1 | Pitt Stadium; Pittsburgh, PA (rivalry) | W 28–7 | 19,936–23,000 | |
| November 27 | at No. 18 Duke | No. 1 | Duke Stadium; Durham, NC | W 10–0 | 36,165 | |
^{†}Homecoming; Rankings from AP Poll released prior to the game

== Preseason ==
The Panther faithful had little time to savor the 1936 (8–1–1) football season and Rose Bowl victory, due to a winter of discontent in the athletic department. On Monday February 22, Joe Williams of the New York World-Telegram broke a story about a rift between Coach Jock Sutherland, and Athletic Director Don Harrison that took place at the Rose Bowl. In essence, the coach wanted spending money for the team but the athletic director refused. Mr. Harrison's final statement was: "I made you, now I'm going to break you." Sutherland ended up giving the team money out of his own pocket. Coach Sutherland stated that he would resign "rather than embroil the University of Pittsburgh in a controversy which is neither dignified nor to the best interests of the institution." Mr. Harrison denied the story was factual, but on March 20 his resignation was accepted by the Athletic Council, much to the dismay of Chancellor Dr. John G. Bowman. Dr. Bowman sent three points of athletic policy to the Athletic Council. The third point made clear what the Chancellor thought of subsidizing athletes. "Much discussion of athletics centers around the subsidization of athletes. Much of this talk is nonsense. The University of Pittsburgh should join with other institutions to maintain high and right standards of amateur college athletics. I cannot express to you too strongly my desire that the University shall discourage the giving of special help to students who have nothing to recommend them but athletic ability. On the other hand, the University through the recommendations, chiefly of high school principals and of Senators of the Commonwealth, grants help to more than 2000 students. In these grants there should be no discrimination for or against a boy merely because he has athletic ability. In other words, you are charged with the responsibility to discourage any subsidies, from whatever source, to students merely because of athletic ability." On May 3 Dr. Bowman named James Hagan, a letterman halfback on Sutherland's 1925–27 teams, to the office of athletic director. Hagan had been Harrison's assistant for the previous 8 years, occupying the office of Graduate Manager of Athletics. He took office in July and immediately presented his nine-point policy to the Athletic Council. The infamous "Hagan Plan", which Sutherland claimed he had not seen until he read it in the newspaper in October, was accepted by the athletic council and lauded by Chancellor Bowman. It would be the downfall of Pitt football for decades. The major problems were the players would be subsidized, but they would have to work two hours a day to earn it and the schedule would be only eight games a season. Sutherland thought the schedule would not be against major powers but lesser competition to equal the talent that he would be recruiting. That would not be the case. The minor issues were that Sutherland could no longer write newspaper articles or do radio ads to make extra money; Sutherland had no control over the schedule; Camp Hamilton fall practice was abolished; and Sutherland could not recruit off campus.

After the Panthers successful season, Jock Sutherland's coaching staff got raided. Carnegie Tech hired Pitt assistant coach Bill Kern as their new head coach and he added Pitt backfield coach Dr. Edward Baker to his staff. Eddie Hirshberg accepted the end coach position at Dartmouth. Sutherland hired Pitt graduates – Alec Fox (assistant tackle coach), Harold Williams (assistant quarterback coach), and Edward Schultz (assistant end coach) – to fill the vacancies.

For the 1937 football season, Al Barr, a senior in the Business School, was appointed varsity manager and David Grossman, a senior in the college, was appointed freshman manager.

Trainer Dr. George "Bud" Moore moved home to Easton, Pennsylvania to start his own dental practice. He came to Pitt as trainer in 1928, graduated from the dental school in 1932 and worked at the practice of Dr. Harry Patton, another Pitt grad, when he was not busy with the football team. On August 19 James Hagan appointed Frank Altmar, health director at the Y.M.H.A., trainer for the football team.

Jock Sutherland's fourteenth spring practice as Pitt head coach started on March 22 at Trees Field. 50 aspirants appeared for the opening week. Sutherland put out his "suits for everyone" plea for more bodies to take part in the six-week drills. On May 1, the sessions ended with a Varsity versus Alumni game. The Varsity routed the Alums 26–7. Reserve halfback John Urban scored three touchdowns to lead the way in front of the 400 spectators who "crashed the gate".

On May 8, Coach Sutherland and the squad put on a free Spectator Clinic in Pitt Stadium for more than 1000 fans to officially close the spring practice session. The fans were treated to "two hours of absorbing the inside of the gridiron sport."

On September 6, the Pitt coaching staff welcomed 60 Panthers, including 21 lettermen, for the start of their two weeks of two-a-day practices on Trees Field. Coach Sutherland housed the squad at the Pittsburgh Athletic Association and set up a training table in the school cafeteria. When school opened on September 20, practice was once a day until the home opener on September 25 against Ohio Wesleyan.

The Pittsburgh Sun-Telegraph noted that: "Children under 12 years of age will be admitted to Pitt football games for 25 cents. Sections 23 and 24 are reserved for this group."

== Coaching staff ==
1937 Pittsburgh Panthers football staff
| Coaching staff: John B. "Jock" Sutherland – Head coach; Charley Bowser – Assistant coach; Alex Fox – tackle coach; Harold Williams – quarterback coach; Ralph Daugherty – center coach; Michael Nicksick – backfield coach; Edward Schultz – end coach; Walter Milligan– Freshman coach | Support staff: Dr. H. A. Ralph Shanor – team physician; Frank Altmar – team trainer; Percy S. Browne – custodian of equipment; James Hagan - director of athletics; Frank Carver – publicity director; Albert Barr – varsity student manager; David Grossnan– freshmen student manager |

== Team photo ==
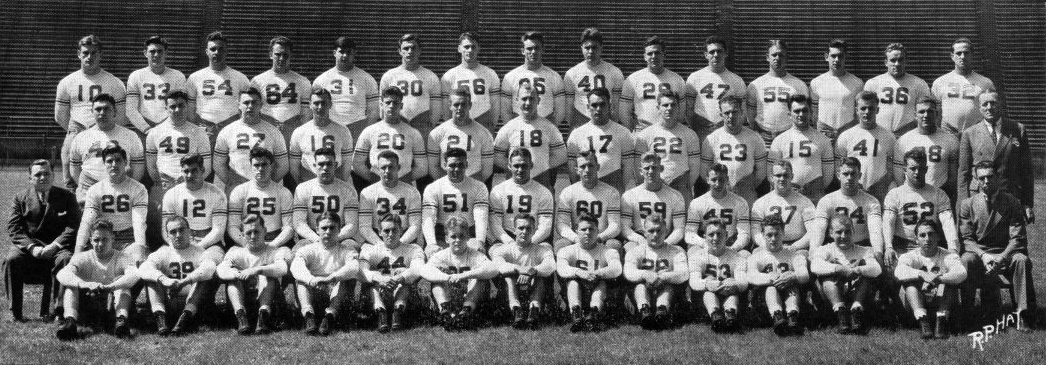
The 1937 undefeated National Championship Pitt team. Members included in the picture are: Horton, Yocos, Kapurka, Soroka, Shea, Fleming, Herlinger, Shord, Stapulis, Goodell, Cassiano, Dalle Tezze, Goldberg Barr, Kish, Daddio, Urban, Curry, Peace, Schmidt, Raskowski, Morrow, Klein, C. Cambal, Richards, Patrick, Shaw, Grossman Musulin, Walton, Michelosen, Adams, Lezouski, Stebbins, Asavitch, Merkovsky, Hensley, Souchak, Delich, Miller, Etze, Sutherland Petro, Farkas, J. Cambal, Corace, Chickerneo, Naric, Holt, Spotovich, Hafer, Dannies, Fullerton, Berger, Jackman, Kristufek, Dickinson

== Roster ==
1937 Pittsburgh Panthers football roster
| Player | Position | Games | Weight | Class | Prep School | Hometown |
|---|---|---|---|---|---|---|
| Anthony Matisi* | tackle | 10 | 215 | 1938 | Endicott H. S. | Endicott, NY |
| Dante Dalle Tezze* | guard | 10 | 190 | 1938 | Jeannette H. S. | Jeannette, PA |
| George Delich* | tackle | 10 | 192 | 1938 | Froebel H.S. | Gary, IN |
| Henry Adams* | center | 8 | 185 | 1938 | California H. S. | California, PA |
| Walter Raskowski* | guard | 10 | 190 | 1939 | New Castle H. S. | New Castle, PA |
| Albin Lezouski* | guard | 9 | 185 | 1939 | Mahanoy City H. S. | Mahanoy City, PA |
| Donald Hensley* | center | 10 | 196 | 1938 | Huntington H. S. | Huntington, WV |
| Frank Souchak* | end | 10 | 198 | 1938 | Berwick H. S. | Berwick., PA |
| Frank Patrick* | fullback | 10 | 192 | 1938 | Roosevelt H. S. | East Chicago, IN |
| Marshall Goldberg* | halfback | 9 | 186 | 1939 | Elkins H. S. | Elkins, WVA |
| John Urban* | halfback | 9 | 165 | 1938 | Larksville H. S. | Larksville, PA |
| Elmer Merkovsky* | tackle | 10 | 204 | 1939 | Scott H. S. | North Braddock. PA |
| Harold Stebbins* | halfback | 10 | 185 | 1939 | Williamsport H. S. | Williamsport, PA |
| Ted Schmidt* | tackle | 10 | 200 | 1938 | Carrick H. S. | Carrick, PA |
| Paul Shaw* | end | 10 | 192 | 1938 | Bradford H. S. | Bradford, PA |
| Stephen Petro* | guard | 9 | 185 | 1939 | Johnstown H. S. | Johnstown, PA |
| John Michelosen* | quarterback | 10 | 190 | 1938 | Ambridge H. S. | Ambridge, PA |
| William Stapulis* | halfback | 10 | 185 | 1938 | California H. S. | California, PA |
| Fabian Hoffman* | end | 8 | 178 | 193 | Central Catholic H. S. | Pittsburgh, PA |
| Robert Dannies* | center | 8 | 200 | 1939 | Westmont H. S. (PA) | Wauwatosa, WI |
| John Chickerneo* | quarterback | 10 | 197 | 1939 | Warren H. S. | Warren, OH |
| Richard Cassiano* | halfback | 9 | 170 | 1940 | Albany H. S. | Albany, NY |
| William Daddio* | end | 8 | 185 | 1939 | Meadville H. S. | Meadville, PA |
| Benjamin Kish | quarterback | 7 | 189 | 1940 | Tonawanda H. S. | Tonowanda, NY |
| Edward Spotovich | end | 7 | 187 | 1938 | South H. S. | Pittsburgh, PA |
| Lawrence Peace* | halfback | 7 | 180 | 1940 | Bradford H. S. | Bradford, PA |
| Emil Narick | quarterback | 5 | 180 | 1940 | Benwood H. S. | Benwood, WV |
| Ralph Hafer | tackle | 5 | 185 | 1940 | Dormont H. S. | Dormont, PA |
| John Dickinson | end | 3 | 182 | 1940 | Peabody H. S. | Pittsburgh, PA |
| William Farkas | fullback | 3 | 178 | 1940 | Windber H. S. | Windber, PA |
| Charles Fleming | end | 1 | 165 | 1939 | New Castle H. S. | New Castle, PA |
| Frank Kristufek | tackle | 0 | 198 | 1940 | McKeesport H. S. | McKeesport, PA |
| Luther Richards | guard | 1 | 175 | 1938 | Kingston H. S. | Kingston, PA |
| Carmen Etze | tackle | 1 | 200 | 1940 | Mt. Pleasant H. S. | Mt. Pleasant, PA |
| George Yocos | guard | 2 | 175 | 1938 | Monessen H. S. | Monessen, PA |
| Ben Asavitch | tackle | 3 | 200 | 1939 | Wilkes-Barre Memorial H. S. | Wilkes-Barre, PA |
| Walter Miller | end | 1 | 178 | 1938 | Phillipsburg H. S. | Phillipsburg, NJ |
| Clement Cambal | fullback | 2 | 172 | 1939 | Springdale H. S. | Springdale, PA |
| Howard Jackman | halfback | 1 | 161 | 1939 | Peabody H. S. | Pittsburgh, PA |
| Richard Fullerton | center | 1 | 170 | 1940 | Madison H. S. | Madison, NJ |
| Joseph Morrow | end | 1 | 178 | 1938 | Mars H. S. | Mars, PA |
| George Musulin | tackle | 0 | 220 | 1938 | Mt. Lebanon H.S. | Mt. Lebanon, PA |
| Albert Walton | guard | 3 | 185 | 1938 | Beaver Falls H. S. | Beaver Falls, PA |
| Frank Goodell | fullback | 1 | 175 | 1940 | Curtis H. S. | Staten Island, NY |
| Joseph Cambal | tackle | 2 | 200 | 1940 | Kiskiminetas Springs H. S. | Springdale, PA |
| Alfred Berger | tackle | 0 | 185 | 1939 | Allegheny H. S. | Pittsburgh, PA |
| Leslie Holt | end | 0 | 170 | 1940 | Meadville H. S. | Meadville, PA |
| James Kosinski | quarterback | 1 | 160 | 1939 | Sheffield H. S. | Pittsburgh, PA |
| Harold Klein | guard | 3 | 176 | 1940 | Altoona H. S. | Altoona, PA |
| James Scarfpin | guard | 3 | 195 | 1938 | Altoona H. S. | Martins Ferry, OH |
| Arthur Corace | guard | 0 | 177 | 1940 | Carrick H. S. | Carrick, PA |
| Fred Herlinger | halfback | 0 | 155 | 1940 | Mt. Lebanon H. S. | Mt. Lebanon, PA |
| John Kapurka | end | 1 | 165 | 1940 | | Pittsburgh, PA |
| Willard Curry | center | 1 | 185 | 1939 | | East McKeesport, PA |
| Earl Shord | fullback | 0 | 175 | 1940 | | Pittsburgh, PA |
| Stephen Horton | end | 0 | 162 | 1940 | | Pittsburgh, PA |
| Charles Shea | halfback | 1 | 155 | 1939 | | Pittsburgh, PA |
| George Soroka | halfback | 1 | 162 | 1940 | | Pittsburgh, PA |
| David Grossman* | freshman student manager | | | 1938 | Turtle Creek Union, H. S. | Turtle Creek, PA |
| Albert Barr* | varsity student manager | | | 1938 | Central Catholic H. S. | Pittsburgh, PA |
| * Letterman | | | | | | |

== Game summaries ==
=== Ohio Wesleyan ===
Week 1: Ohio Wesleyan at Pitt

| Team | 1 | 2 | 3 | 4 | Total |
|---|---|---|---|---|---|
| Ohio Wesleyan | 0 | 0 | 6 | 0 | 6 |
| • Pitt | 13 | 14 | 13 | 19 | 59 |

- Date: September 25, 1937
- Location: Pitt Stadium
  Pittsburgh, PA
- Game start: 2:00 p.m.
- Game attendance: 20,000
- Game weather: warm sunshine
- Referee: H. W. Emswiler (Dennison)

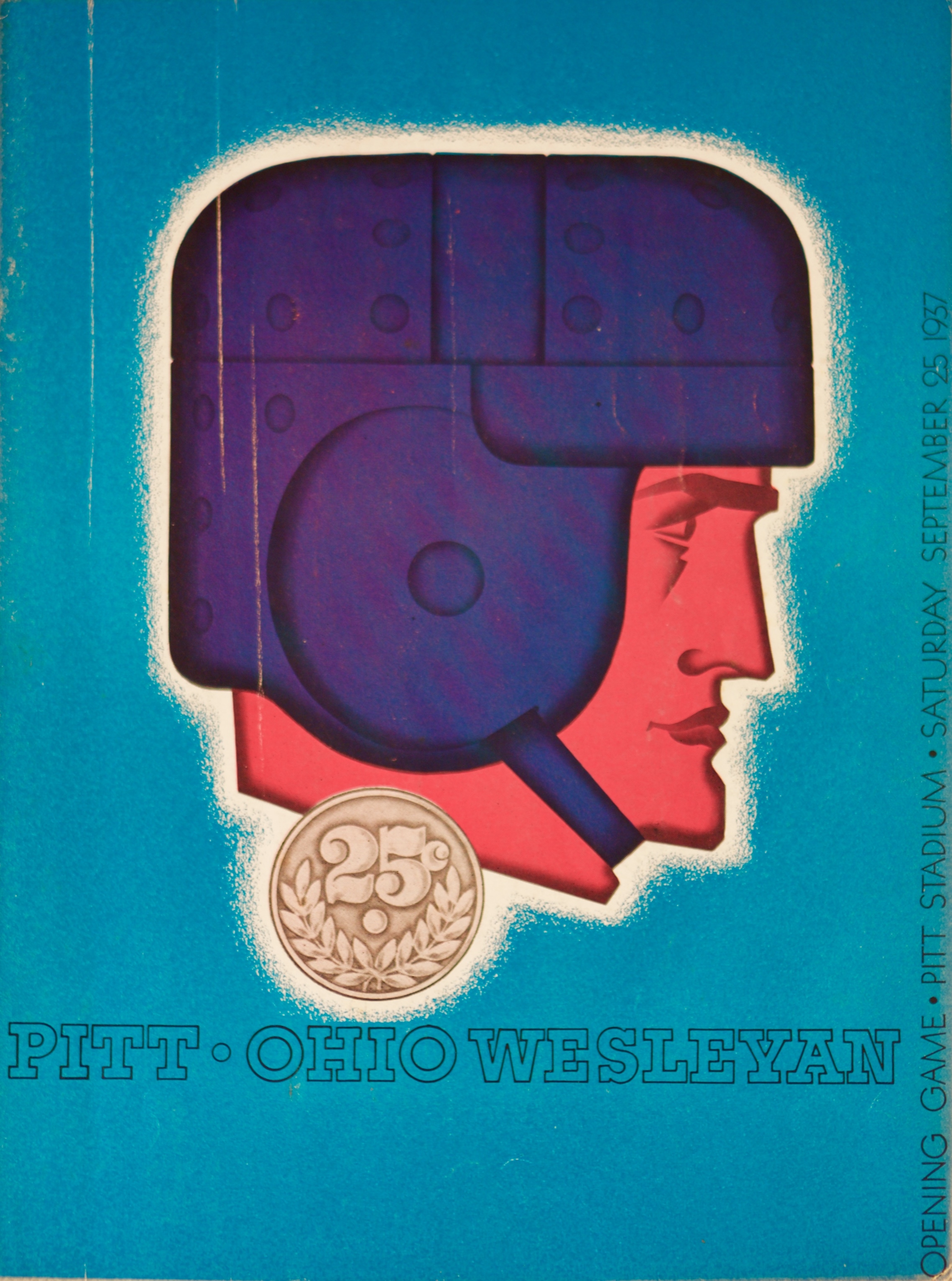
Program for September 25 game versus Ohio Wesleyan

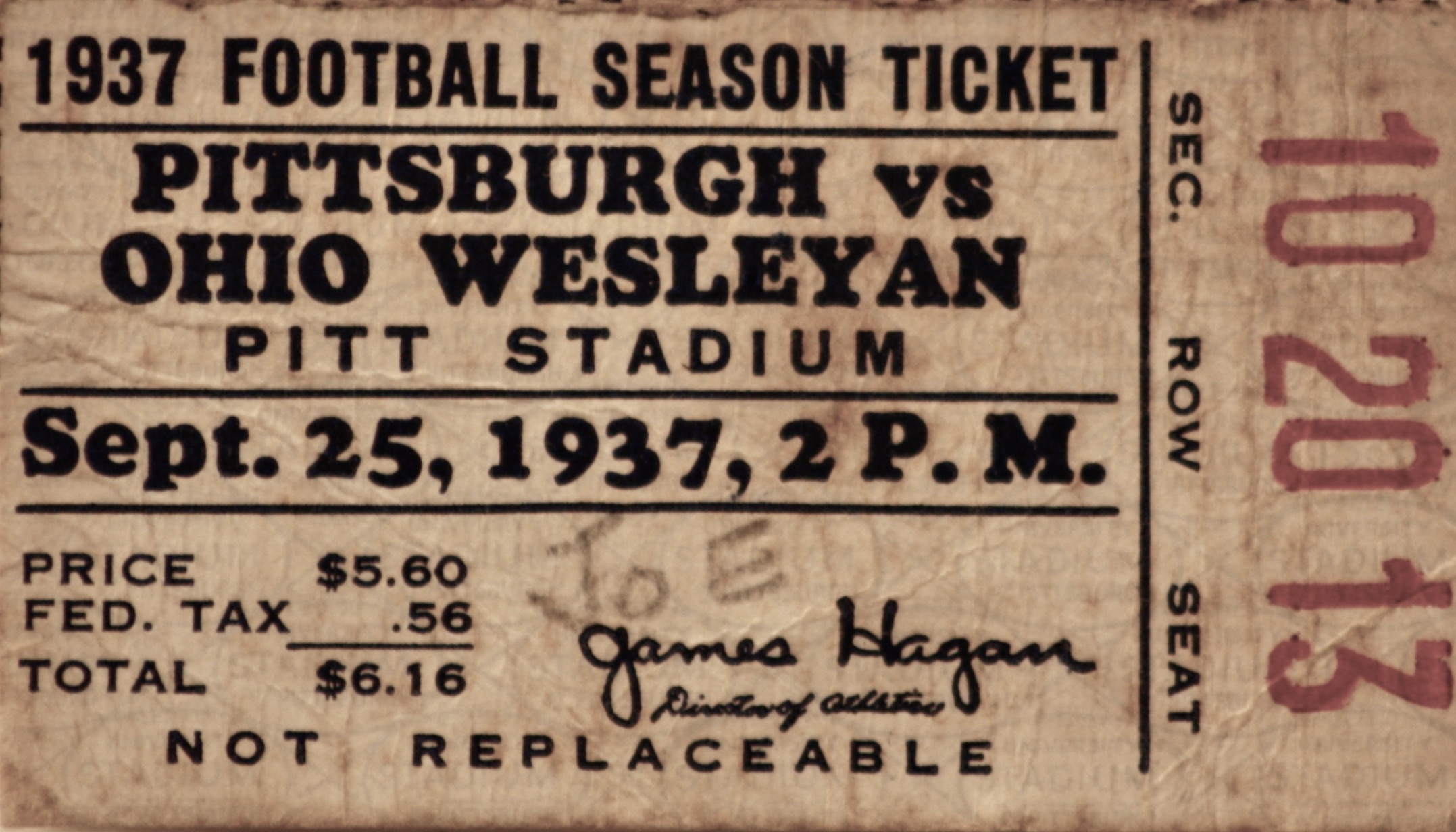
Ticket stub for September 25 game versus Ohio Wesleyan

For the second year in a row the Pitt Panthers welcomed the Ohio Wesleyan Bishops for their home opener. George Gauthier's eleven fell to the Panthers 53–0 in 1936, and were determined to make a better showing this time around. History shows that the Bishops were capable, as they upset Michigan, Syracuse and Michigan State in previous years.

Coach Sutherland had the luxury of eight returning starters and at least two lettermen vying for the three vacant spots in the lineup. Les Biederman of The Pittsburgh Press noted: "Dr. Jock Sutherland is far from pleased with the mental attitude of his gridders and would like them to catch a rude shock tomorrow afternoon, but not too rude."

In front of more than 19,000 fans, the veteran Panther squad routed the Bishops 59 to 0. On the first play from scrimmage Marshall Goldberg, Pitt's All-American halfback, intercepted a pass and raced 55-yards for the first score. Goldberg was replaced by sophomore Dick Cassiano, who responded with a 4-touchdown performance. Cassiano rushed for two scores, caught a touchdown pass, returned an interception for six points and he capped off his offensive dexterity by throwing a touchdown pass to fellow sophomore end, John Dickinson. Fullback Frank Patrick added two scores and Bill Stapulis one. Four placekickers (Bill Daddio, Elmer Merkovsky (2), William Farkas and Frank Souchak) converted five of nine extra points.

Ohio Wesleyan finished their season with a 2–7 record. The Panthers and Bishops would not meet on the gridiron again.

The Pitt starting lineup for the game against Ohio Wesleyan was Bill Daddio (end), Tony Matisi (tackle), Walter Raskowski (guard), Henry Adams (center), Steve Petro (guard), George Delich (tackle), Frank Souchak (end), John Michelosen (quarterback), Marshall Goldberg (left halfback), Harold Stebbins (right halfback) and Frank Patrick (fullback). Substitutes appearing in the game for Pitt were Paul Shaw, Charles Fleming, John Dickinson, Walter Miller, Leslie Holt, John Kapurka, Edward Spotovich, Stephen Horton, Joseph Morrow, Elmer Merkovsky, Ben Asavitch, Frank Kristufek, Carmen Etze, Ralph Hafer, George Musulin, Ted Schmidt, Joseph Cambal, Alfred Berger, Dante Dalle Tezze, Albin Lezouski, Luther Richards, George Yocos, Albert Walton, Harold Klein, Arthur Corace, Don Hensley, Robert Dannies, Richard Fullerton, William Curry, John Chickerneo, Ben Kish, Emil Narick, James Koskinski, John Urban, Lawrence Peace, Dick Cassiano, Charles Shea, Clement Cambal, Howard Jackman, Fred Herlinger, George Soroka, Bill Stapulis, William Farkas, Frank Goodell, James Scarpfin and Earl Shord.

Scoring summary

| Quarter | Time | Drive | | | Team | Scoring information | Score | |
| Quarter | Time | Plays | Yards | TOP | Team | Scoring information | Ohio Wesleyan | Pittsburgh |
|---|---|---|---|---|---|---|---|---|
| 1 | | 1 | 55 | | Pittsburgh | Interception returned 55 yards for touchdown by Marshall Goldberg, Bill Daddio kick good | 0 | 7 |
| 1 | | 3 | 16 | | Pittsburgh | Frank Patrick 4-yard touchdown run, Bill Daddio kick no good | 0 | 13 |
| 2 | | 2 | 48 | | Pittsburgh | Dick Cassiano 48-yard touchdown run, Elmer Merkovsky kick good | 0 | 20 |
| 2 | | 4 | 31 | | Pittsburgh | Dick Cassiano 15-yard touchdown reception from Lawrence Peace, Elmer Merkovsky kick good | 0 | 27 |
| 3 | | 11 | 64 | | Pittsburgh | Frank Patrick 1-yard touchdown run, Bill Daddio kick no good | 0 | 33 |
| 3 | | 1 | 58 | | Pittsburgh | Bill Stapulis 58-yard touchdown run, Frank Souchak kick good | 0 | 40 |
| 4 | | 2 | 70 | | Pittsburgh | Dick Cassiano 67-yard touchdown run, William Farkas kick good | 0 | 47 |
| 4 | | 2 | 37 | | Pittsburgh | John Dickinson 36-yard touchdown reception from Dick Cassiano, William Farkas kick no good | 0 | 53 |
| 4 | | 1 | 46 | | Pittsburgh | Interception returned 46 yards for touchdown by Dick Cassiano, Frank Goodell kick no good | 0 | 59 |
| "TOP" = time of possession. For other American football terms, see Glossary of American football. | | | | | | | 0 | 59 |

=== At West Virginia ===
Week 2: Pitt at West Virginia

| Team | 1 | 2 | 3 | 4 | Total |
|---|---|---|---|---|---|
| • Pitt | 0 | 7 | 0 | 13 | 20 |
| West Virginia | 0 | 0 | 0 | 0 | 0 |

- Date: October 2, 1937
- Location: Mountaineer Field
  Morgantown, WV
- Game start: 2:30 p.m.
- Game attendance: 18,000
- Game weather: sunny and warm
- Referee: Russell Goodwin (Washington & Jefferson)

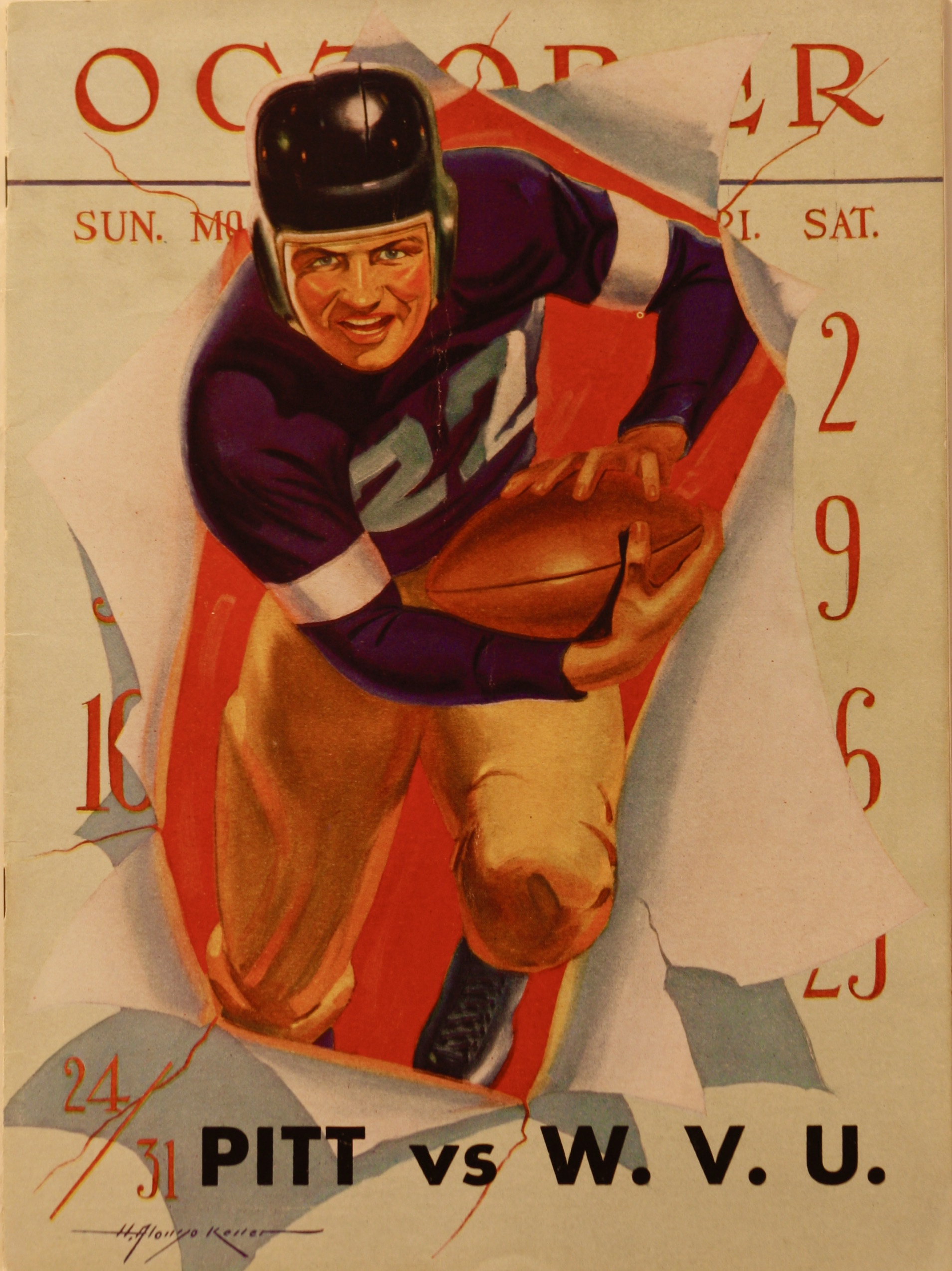
Program for October 2 game versus West Virginia

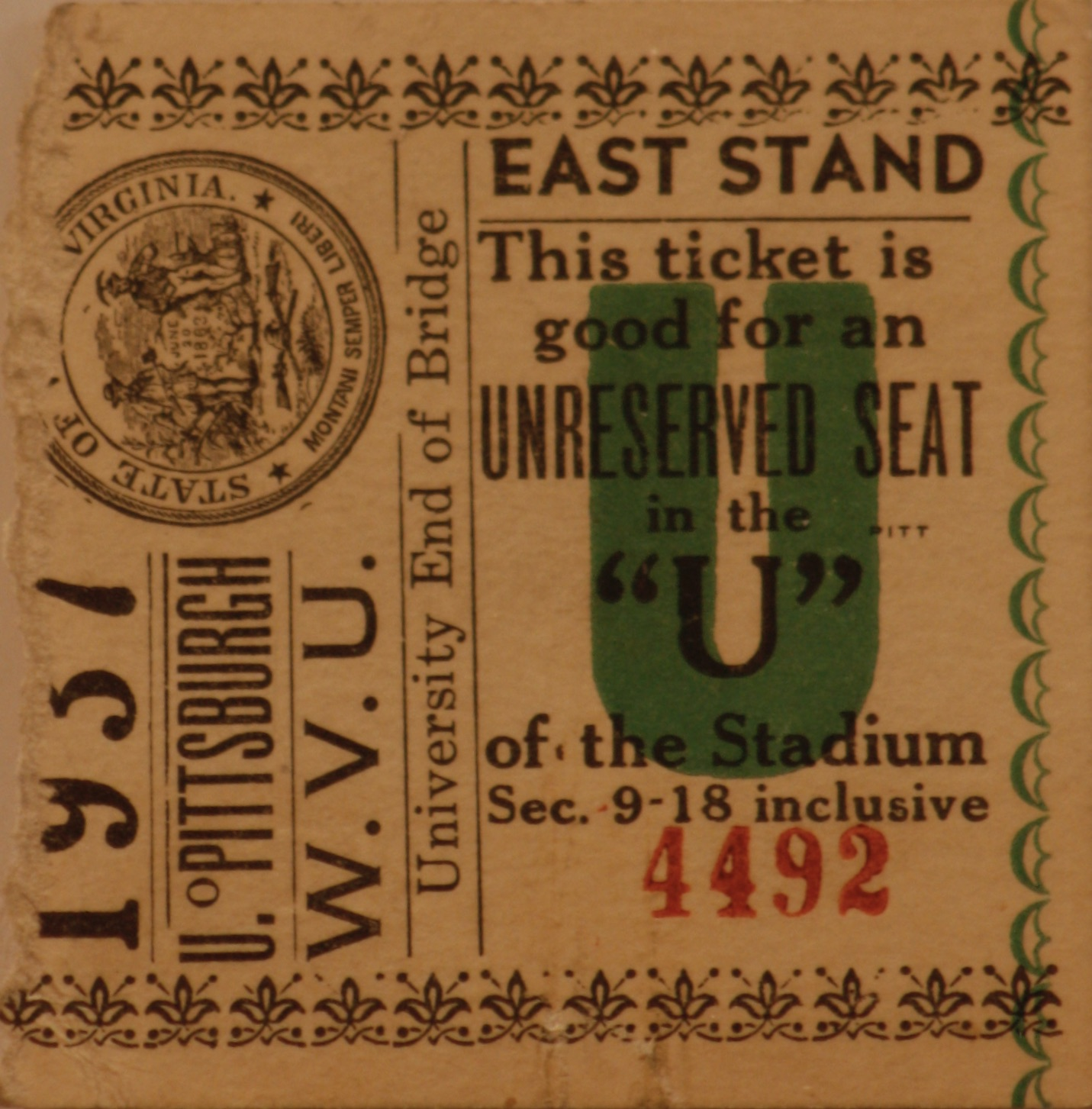
Bleacher seat ticket stub for October 2 game at West Virginia

On October 2, the Panthers rode to Morgantown, WV for their annual game with the Mountaineers. First year coach Marshall Glenn, former Mountaineer quarterback, and his squad opened the season with a 14–0 victory over West Virginia Wesleyan. Les Biederman of The Pittsburgh Press noted: "Coach Glenn has a rugged team at West Virginia but it isn't expected to cause the Panthers any great trouble...In fact the West Virginians have scored only two touchdowns in the last seven years."

Coach Sutherland named Dante Dalle Tezze starting guard in place of Steve Petro, and Don Hensley starting center for Henry Adams. Harold Stebbins received minor injuries in the Ohio Wesleyan game, so Bill Stapulis got the start at halfback.

The Panthers made it nine straight over the Mountaineers with a 20–0 shutout. West Virginia did not make it easy for Pitt. In the first quarter, the Panthers had the ball on the Mountaineer 1-yard line and 6-yard line, and both times were unable to score. In the second period John Urban scampered 29-yards for a touchdown and Elmer Merkovsky added the placement for a 7–0 lead at halftime. In the third quarter the Mountaineers' offense advanced the ball to the Panther 30-yard line, but the Panther defense held. The Pitt offense got on track in the fourth quarter and sustained 2 long drives to ice the game. The first was a 6-play 81-yard drive with Harold Stebbins rushing the last 21 yards for the score. Frank Souchak missed the extra point. A 5-play 76-yard drive followed with Stebbins going in from the 8-yard line for the final touchdown. Merkovsky added the placement. In the closing minutes the Mountaineers' offense advanced the ball to the Pitt 1-yard line, but the Panther defense kept them out of the end zone.

Coach Sutherland vented in his column: "I'm sorry to say we have nothing over which to enthuse...This scare today might do Pitt some good. I haven't been able to talk to these boys all season long, that is, until between halves, after West Virginia had tossed us around the first two quarters. There are too many persons telling our boys what good football players they are. They didn't show it this afternoon."

The Mountaineers finished their season with an 8–1–1 record, which included a 7–6 victory over Texas Tech in the Sun Bowl.

The Pitt starting lineup for the game against West Virginia was Bill Daddio (left end), Tony Matisi (left tackle), Walter Raskowski (left guard), Don Hensley (center), Dante Dalle Tezze (right guard), George Delich (right tackle), Frank Souchak (right end), John Michelosen (quarterback), Marshall Goldberg (left halfback), Bill Stapulis (right halfback) and Frank Patrick (fullback). Substitutes appearing in the game for Pitt were Henry Adams, John Urban, Edward Spotovich, Elmer Merkovsky, Harold Stebbins, John Chickerneo, Ted Schmidt, Paul Shaw, Fabian Hoffman, Dick Cassiano, Lawrence Peace and Robert Dannies.

Scoring summary

| Quarter | Time | Drive | | | Team | Scoring information | Score | |
| Quarter | Time | Plays | Yards | TOP | Team | Scoring information | Pittsburgh | West Virginia |
|---|---|---|---|---|---|---|---|---|
| 2 | | 3 | 38 | | Pittsburgh | John Urban 29-yard touchdown run, Elmer Merkovsky kick good | 7 | 0 |
| 4 | | 6 | 81 | | Pittsburgh | Harold Stebbins 21-yard touchdown run, Frank Souchak kick no good | 13 | 0 |
| 4 | | 5 | 76 | | Pittsburgh | Harold Stebbins 8-yard touchdown run, Elmer Merkovsky kick good | 20 | 0 |
| "TOP" = time of possession. For other American football terms, see Glossary of American football. | | | | | | | 20 | 0 |

=== Duquesne ===
Week 3: Duquesne at Pitt

| Team | 1 | 2 | 3 | 4 | Total |
|---|---|---|---|---|---|
| Duquesne | 0 | 0 | 0 | 0 | 0 |
| • Pitt | 6 | 0 | 0 | 0 | 6 |

- Date: October 9, 1937
- Location: Pitt Stadium
  Pittsburgh, PA
- Game start: 2:00 p.m.
- Game attendance: 55,000
- Game weather: rain
- Referee: E. A. Geiges (Temple)

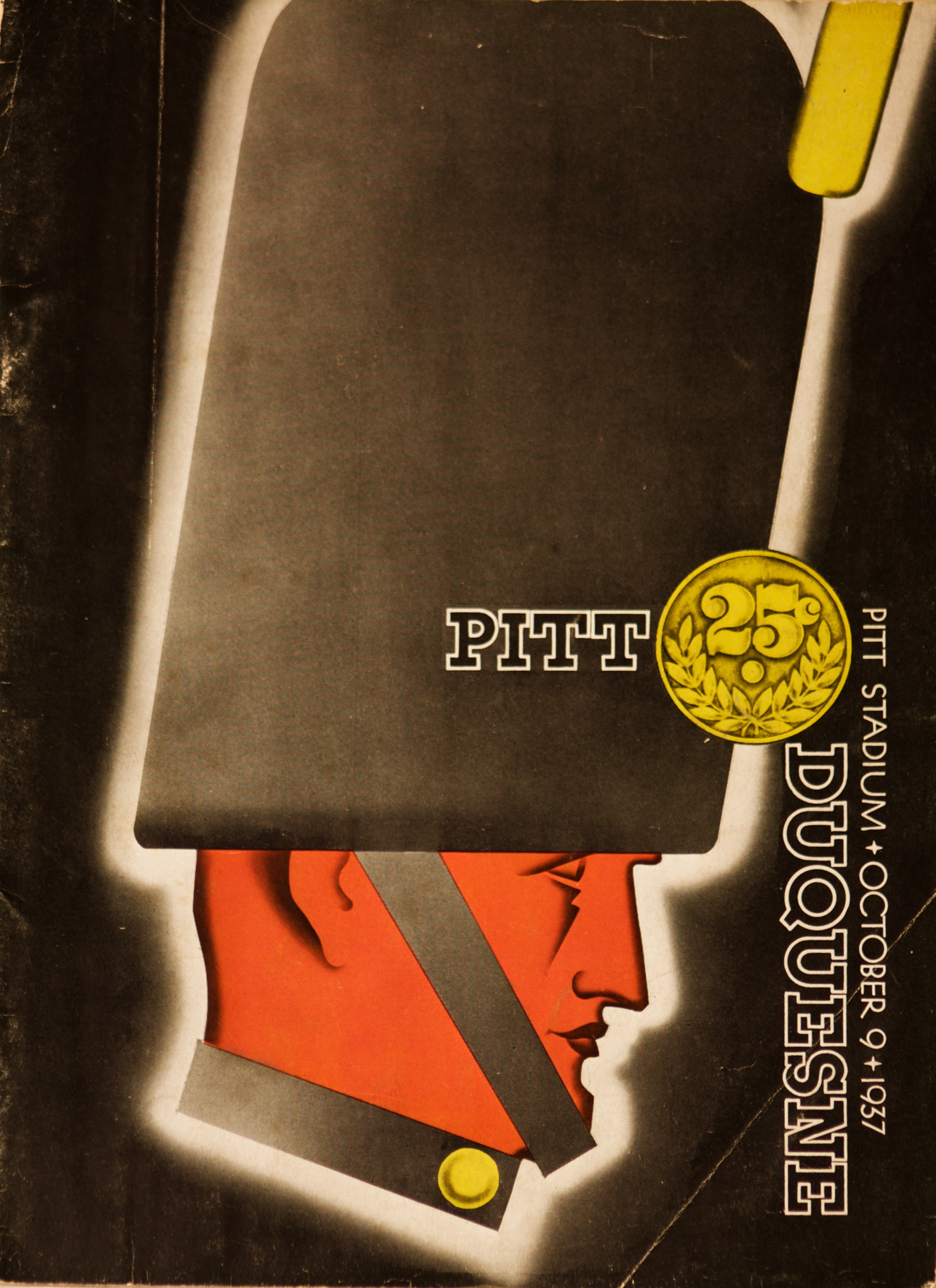
Program for October 9 game versus Duquesne

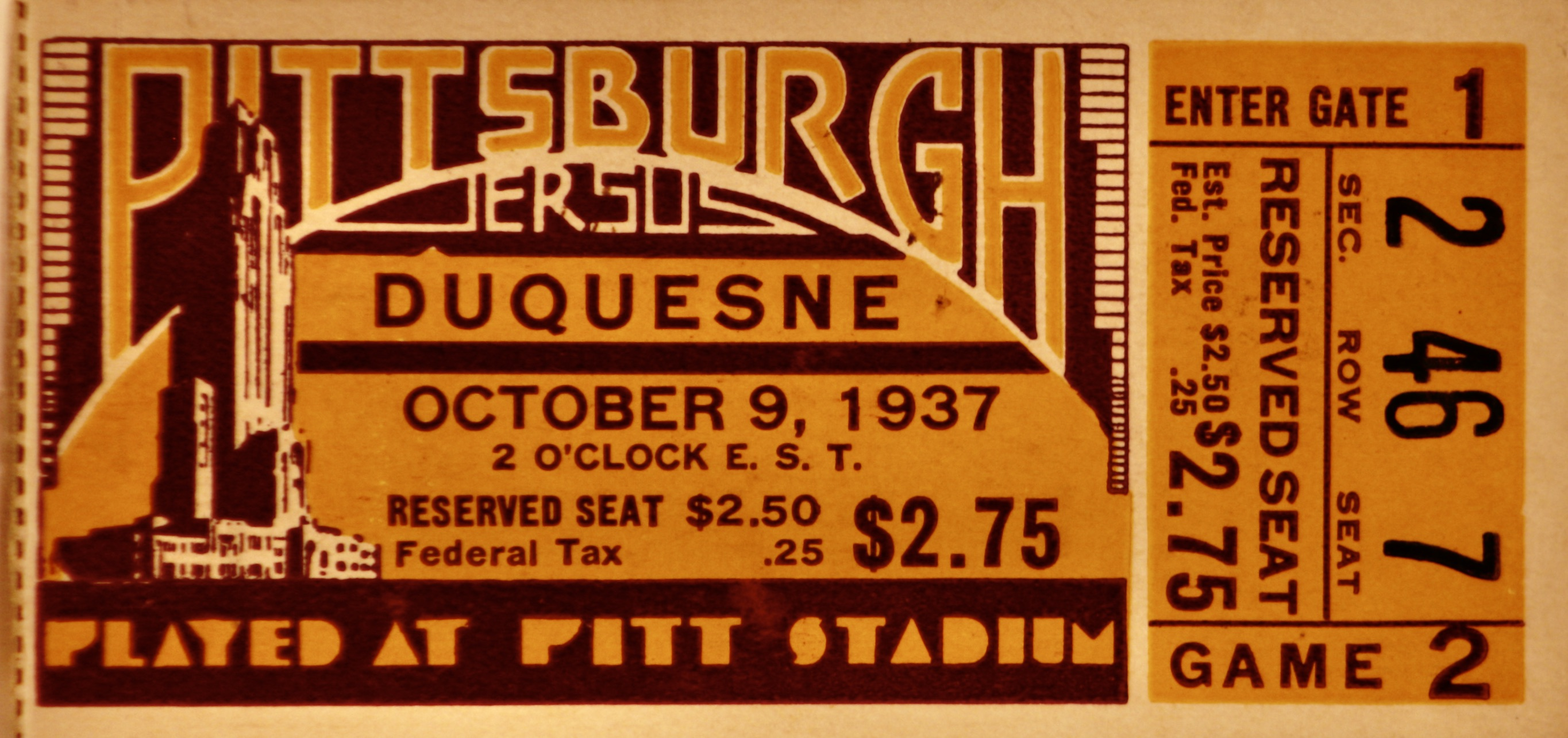
Ticket stub for October 9 game versus Duquesne

The Panthers welcomed their city-rival and the reigning city champion Duquesne Dukes on October 9 for the fourth meeting of their series. The Panthers held a 2–1 edge, but the Dukes administered Pitt's only in 1936. Coach John "Clipper" Smith's crew was 2–0 on the season. They beat Waynesburg (33–7) and West Virginia Wesleyan (39–0) to prepare for the Panthers.

At the Friday night Duquesne pep rally, Father T. R. Jones, professor of philosophy at Duquesne, stated: "Duquesne's football players will be out there fighting because they love their school. The Pitt boys will be out there fighting for the weekly pay checks. Our boys don't have everything they give their players at Pitt, but there isn't a Duquesne man who isn't as good as any three Pitt men that ever walked." The school immediately issued an apology and the professor said he did not remember saying it. David Finoli reported in When Pitt Ruled the Gridiron: "While Father Jones eventually was relieved of his faculty position because of his comments, there was some hypocrisy with his statements as the Dukes players received tuition, books, meals, room and board and clothing free as well as $15 spending money a month. Despite the fact that Pitt players received tuition and books free, the $48.50 a month had to pay for room, board and clothing, which the Duquesne players already received."

Coach Sutherland told The Pitt News: "In all my experience with Pitt teams I have found that beating them two years in succession is the hardest possible thing to do. I hope that this year's team is no exception. I have watched the Duquesne team play this year and know definitely that they have a great team. The confidence and realization of potentiality that came with defeating Pitt last year has improved their play enormously...I feel sure we will play the best kind of football we are capable of. The game is a toss-up."

55,000 rain-soaked football fans saw the Panthers gain their revenge. Marshall Goldberg took a hand-off on Pitt's second play of the game and reversed field twice, as he completed a 77-yard touchdown scamper. Frank Souchak missed the point after and Pitt led 6–0. That was the end of the scoring for the day. The rest of the first half was a battle between the 30-yard lines. At the start of the third quarter, Pitt advanced the ball from their 46-yard line to the Duquesne 2-yard line, but were stopped on downs by the Dukes defense. In the final period Souchak blocked a punt and Pitt gained possession on the Dukes 12-yard line. Dick Cassiano gained 5 yards on first down. On second down Lawrence Peace fumbled and Duquesne recovered on their own 10-yard line. The Duquesne fans soon had reason to cheer. As Duke fullback John Karrs was being tackled by Tony Matisi, Frank Souchak tried to swipe the ball from his hands and punched him. The referee ejected Souchak and stepped off a half the distance to the goal penalty (from the Duquesne 13 to the Pitt 44-yard line). On second down Panther defensive back Cassiano intercepted a pass on his own 32-yard line. The Pitt offense was forced to punt. The center snap sailed over John Michelosen's head and he recovered on the 20-yard line. The Duquesne offensive series failed. They gained 2 yards on a rushing play, were penalized 5 yards, gained 9 yards on a short pass, lost 16 yards on a sack, and on fourth down threw an incompletion to end the game.

Duquesne finished the season with a 6–4 record.

The Pitt starting lineup for the game against Duquesne was Bill Daddio (left end), Tony Matisi (left tackle), Albin Lezouski (left guard), Don Hensley (center), Dante Dalle Tezze (right guard), George Delich (right tackle), Frank Souchak (right end), John Chickerneo (quarterback), Marshall Goldberg (left halfback), Harold Stebbins (right halfback) and Bill Stapulis (fullback). Substitutes appearing in the game for Pitt were Paul Shaw, Ted Schmidt, Walter Raskowski, George Yocos, Robert Dannies, Steve Petro, Elmer Merkovsky, John Dickinson, John Michelosen, John Urban, Dick Cassiano, Lawrence Peace, Henry Adams, Edward Spotovich and Frank Patrick.

Scoring summary

| Quarter | Time | Drive | | | Team | Scoring information | Score | |
| Quarter | Time | Plays | Yards | TOP | Team | Scoring information | Duquesne | Pittsburgh |
|---|---|---|---|---|---|---|---|---|
| 1 | | 2 | 80 | | Pittsburgh | Marshall Goldberg 77-yard touchdown run, Frank Souchak kick no good | 0 | 6 |
| "TOP" = time of possession. For other American football terms, see Glossary of American football. | | | | | | | 0 | 6 |

=== At Fordham ===
Week 4: Pitt at Fordham

| Team | 1 | 2 | 3 | 4 | Total |
|---|---|---|---|---|---|
| Pitt | 0 | 0 | 0 | 0 | 0 |
| Fordham | 0 | 0 | 0 | 0 | 0 |

- Date: October 16, 1937
- Location: Polo Grounds
  New York, NY
- Game start: 2:00 p.m.
- Game attendance: 52,000
- Game weather: sunny and warm
- Referee: W. T. Halloran (Providence)

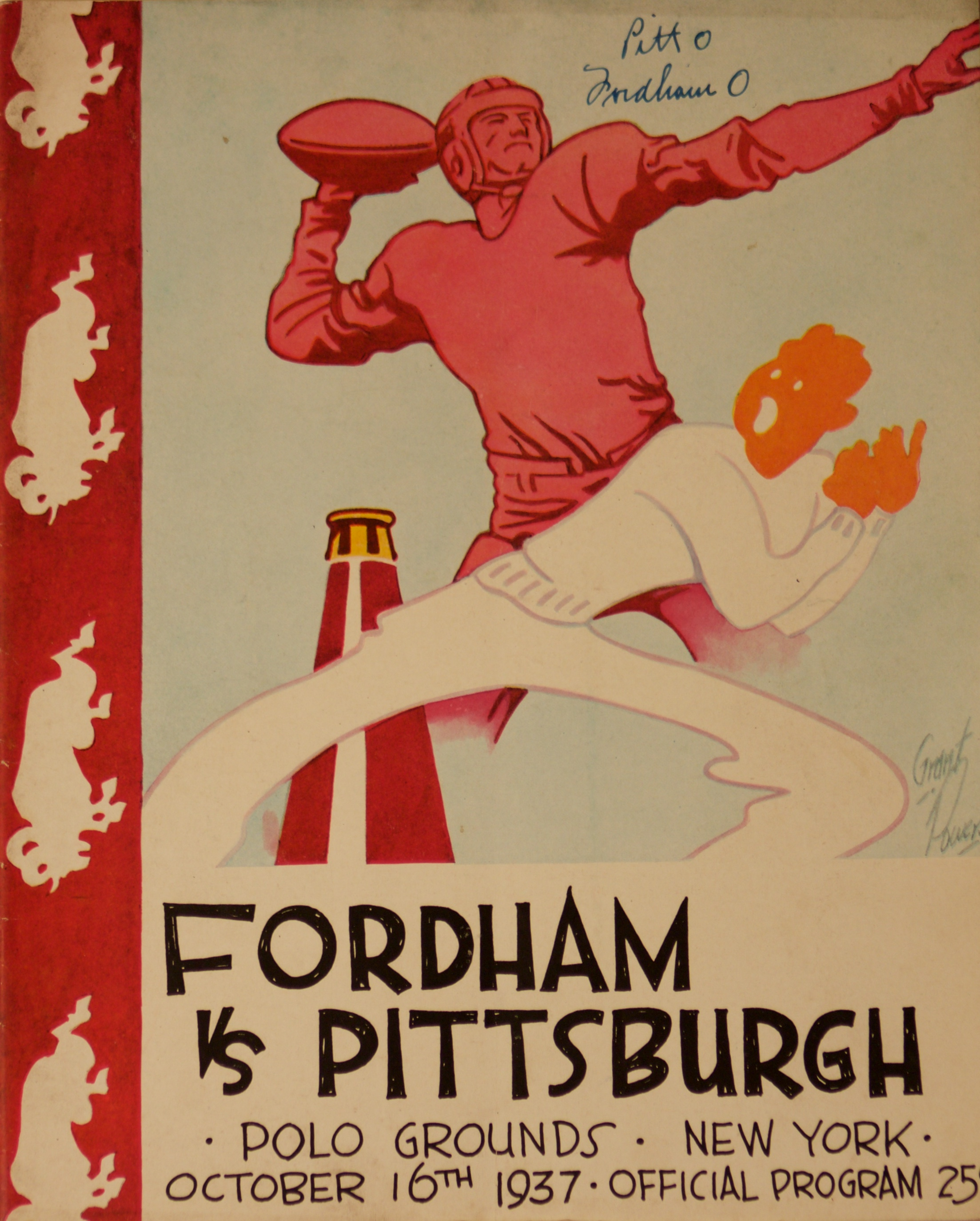
Program for October 16 game versus Fordham

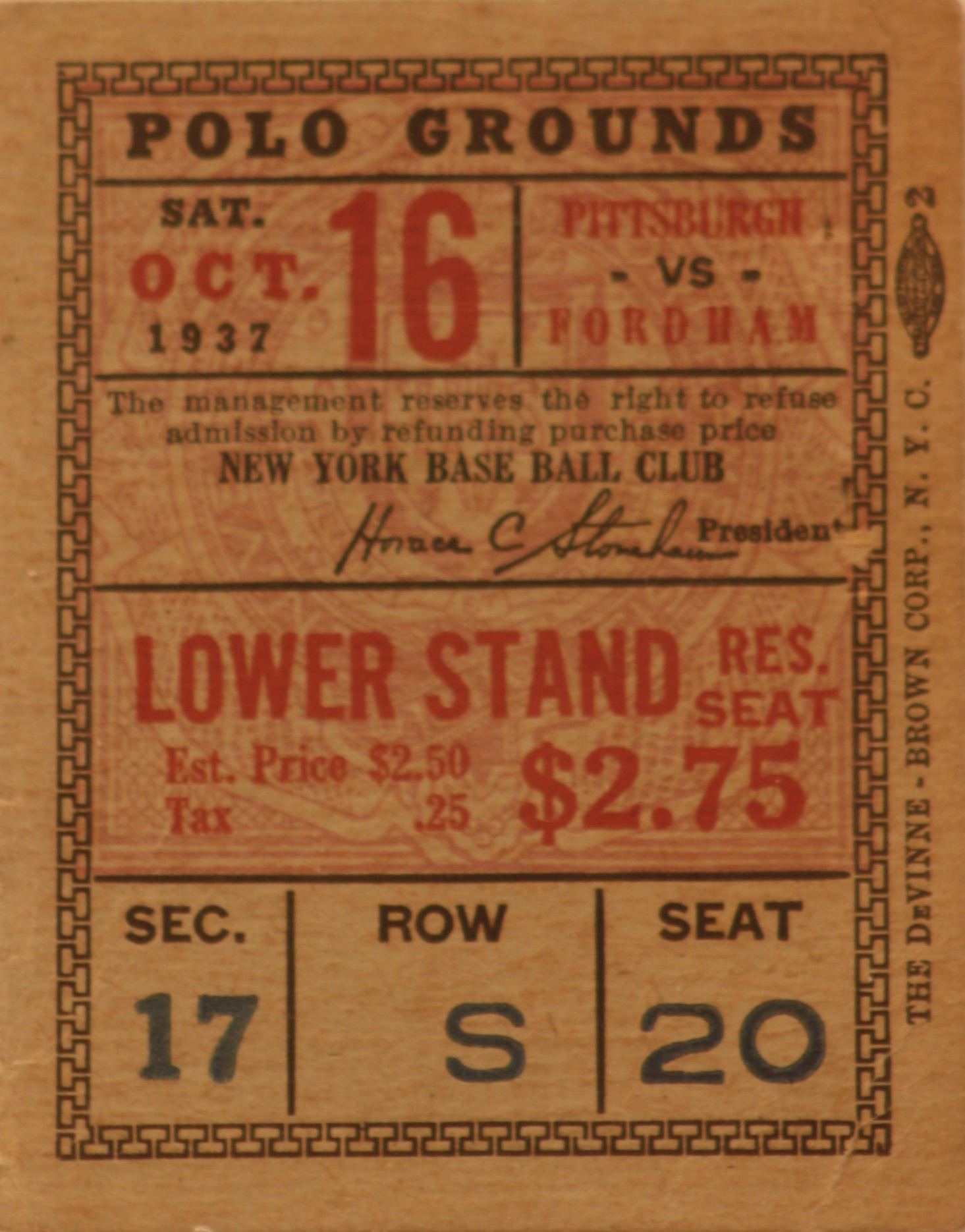
Ticket stub for October 16 game versus Fordham

For the third year in a row, the Panthers traveled to the Polo Grounds in New York City to play the Fordham Rams. Oddly, the series stood at 0–0–2, as neither team had scored in the first two games. Jim Crowley's Rams were 2–0 on the season, beating Franklin & Marshall (68–0) and Waynesburg (48–0). The Rams forward wall (The Fabled Seven Blocks of Granite) was anchored by three All-America candidates. Center Alex Wojciechowicz and tackle Ed Franco were both consensus picks, and tackle Al Babartsky was named third team by the International News Service. With Pitt installed as a 2–1 favorite Coach Crowley told a reporter: "If we get a tie, we'll be tickled."

The Panthers' train arrived in New York on Friday morning and the squad stayed at the Westchester-Biltmore Country Club in Rye, NY. Sutherland told a reporter: "We're going to pull some fancy stuff this year to end this scoreless tie business – if we can, but maybe a tie would be pretty good. They're tough." With the exception of Steve Petro starting at right guard, the Pitt starting lineup was the same as in the Duquesne game.

Chester L. Smith of The Press reported: "For another year, at least, the 'pointless' football feud between Pitt and Fordham must continue. The Panthers and Rams played another tie with no score at the Polo Grounds this afternoon – the third season in succession that neither has been able to prod, probe, or punch a path to the other's goal line – and tonight historians were digging into the archives to learn if there ever had been another series quite like this one."

The Panthers earned 11 first downs and gained 165 yards rushing. Fordham had 4 first downs on 87 yards rushing. Marshall Goldberg scored a touchdown from the 6-yard line late in the second quarter, but the referee called holding on Tony Matisi to negate the score. The Panthers fumbled 5 or 8 times depending on which newspaper you read. Harold "Curly" Stebbins alone fumbled at least 4 times. Fordham recovered at least 6 of them and were in field goal range three times. Luckily for Pitt, Fordham placekicker Johnny Druze missed all three field goal attempts. Noted sportswriter Myron Cope wrote an essay about the Pitt vs. Fordham series – Kissing Your Sister in Front of 43,00 or 45,000 or 50,000 Fans- for the 1978 Alumni News, which was reprinted in Jim O'Brien's book Hail to Pitt. Mr. Cope claimed that Stebbins broke his hand in a practice scrimmage on Thursday prior to the game and could not grip the ball. Stebbins played 59 of the 60 minutes. A sportswriter questioned why Sutherland did not replace him? Jock Sutherland told The Pittsburgh Press: "Curly is a good halfback who was having one of those bad days that come to all of us. When he fumbled first, I didn't think he would do it again.....I knew Stebbins felt worse than anyone else and I would rather have sacrificed the game than one small bit of the boy's pride. What wasn't known was that 'Curly' had been hurt two weeks ago and had had no drilling in ball handling in that time. So perhaps it was my fault for using him at all."

Fordham finished the season with a 7–0–1 record and outscored their opposition 182–16. They finished third in the final Associated Press poll.

The Pitt starting lineup for the game against Fordham was Bill Daddio (left end), Tony Matisi (left tackle), Albin Lezouski (left guard), Don Hensley (center), Steve Petro (right guard), George Delich (right tackle), Frank Souchak (right end), John Chickerneo (quarterback), Marshall Goldberg (left halfback), Harold Stebbins (right halfback) and Frank Patrick (fullback). Substitutes appearing in the game for Pitt were Elmer Merkovsky, Ben Asavitch, Walter Raskowski, Robert Dannies, Dante Dalle Tezze, Ted Schmidt, Fabian Hoffman, Paul Shaw, John Michelosen, Ben Kish, John Urban, Emil Narick and Bill Stapulis.

=== Wisconsin ===
Week 5: Wisconsin at Pitt

| Team | 1 | 2 | 3 | 4 | Total |
|---|---|---|---|---|---|
| Wisconsin | 0 | 7 | 0 | 0 | 7 |
| • Pitt | 7 | 0 | 14 | 0 | 21 |

- Date: October 23, 1937
- Location: Pitt Stadium
  Pittsburgh, PA
- Game start: 2:00 p.m.
- Game attendance: 31,200
- Game weather: cold, rain and snow
- Referee: J. R. Trimble (Dubuque)

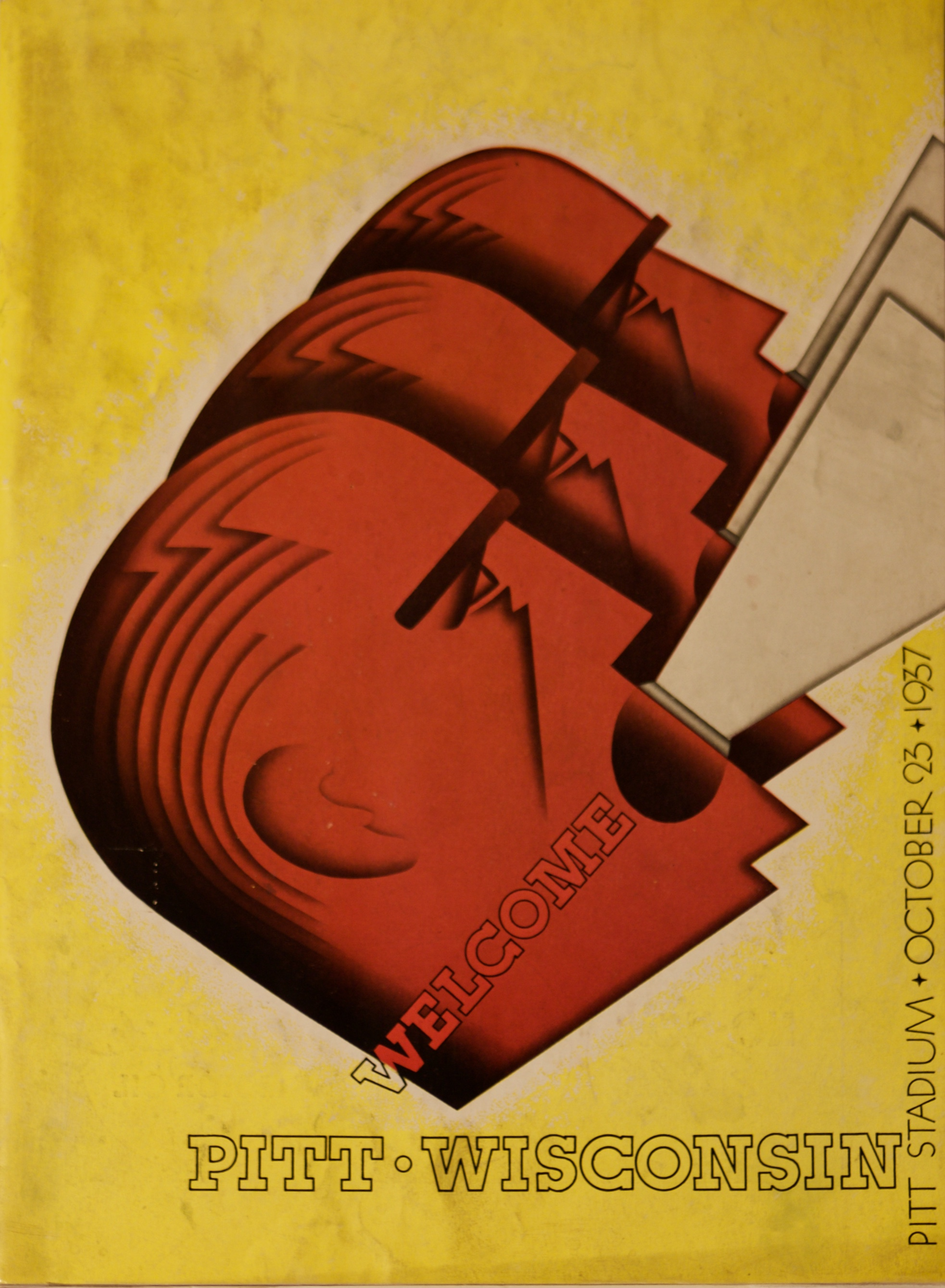
Program for October 23 game versus Wisconsin

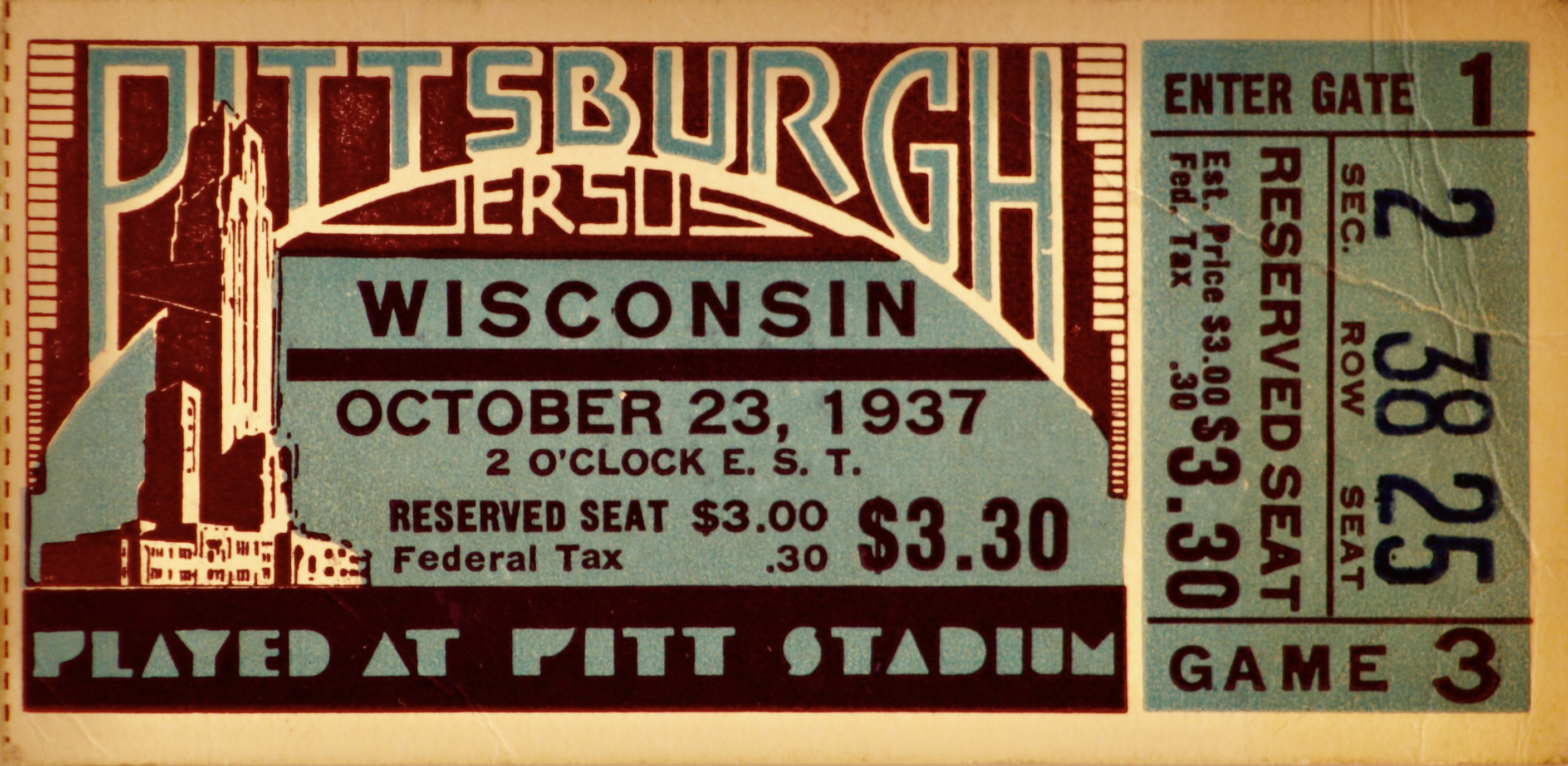
Ticket stub for October 23 game versus Wisconsin

At Homecoming in 1937, the Panthers welcomed the Wisconsin Badgers to Pitt Stadium for their first ever meeting on the gridiron. The Badgers were led by Harry Stuhldreher, the quarterback of the famed Four Horsemen of Notre Dame. Wisconsin was 4–0, beating South Dakota State (32–0), Marquette(12–0), Chicago (27–0) and Iowa (13–6). The Badgers outscored their opposition 84–6. Halfback Bill Schmitz and end Fred Benz earned All-Big Ten second team honors. Coach Stuhldreher told The Wisconsin State Journal: "If we don't win, it will only be because the other team is better."

Pitt raised its record to 4–3–1 against Big Ten competition with a 21–0 shutout of the Wisconsin Badgers. Jess Carver of the Sun-Telegraph noted: "A Homecoming Day crowd of 31,200 fans turned out to view the inauguration of gridiron relations between Pitt and Wisconsin. The weather was cold and clear and dry until the final period, when a combination rain and snow storm struck the stadium without warning, making the remainder of the day miserable for the folks huddled in the stands." Pitt got on the scoreboard in the first quarter with a 12-play 79-yard drive. Marshall Goldberg went through left tackle from the 6-yard line for the score. Bill Daddio added the point after and Pitt led 7 to 0. In the second period the Panther offense advanced the ball to the Badger 4-yard line before losing the ball on downs. On the second play of the third quarter, Goldberg went through left tackle for 63 yards and his second touchdown of the day. Daddio again converted for a 14–0 lead. Dick Cassiano replaced Goldberg later in the third quarter. The Panthers gained possession on their 20-yard line. On second down Cassiano received a lateral from Frank Patrick and raced 75 yards for the final touchdown of the game. Daddio's placement made it 21–0. Wisconsin finished the season with a 4–3–1 record.

The Pitt offense dominated the game with 352 yards gained from scrimmage and 14 first downs. They kept the score close by fumbling 7 times and losing 6 of them. Wisconsin gained 13 yards from scrimmage and 48 yards through the air on 5 pass completions. The Pitt defense held the Badgers to 3 first downs.

The Pitt starting lineup for the game against Wisconsin was Bill Daddio (left end), Tony Matisi (left tackle), Albin Lezouski (left guard), Don Hensley (center), Steve Petro (right guard), George Delich (right tackle), Frank Souchak (right end), John Michelosen (quarterback), Marshall Goldberg (left halfback), Harold Stebbins (right halfback) and Frank Patrick (fullback). Substitutes appearing in the game for Pitt were Paul Shaw, Edward Spotovich, Elmer Merkovsky, Ralph Hafer, Walter Raskowski, Robert Dannies, Henry Adams, Dante Dalle Tezze, Ben Asavitch, Carmen Etze, Harold Klein, Albert Walton, Ted Schmidt, Fabian Hoffman, John Chickerneo, Ben Kish, John Urban, Dick Cassiano, Lawrence Peace, Emil Narick, Bill Stapulis and William Farkas.

On October 24, 1937, the Hagan Plan was made public. Coach Sutherland told the Post-Gazette: "All that I know concerning the policy shift at Pitt is what I have seen in the newspapers. I have not been consulted at all thus far. However, you can make it emphatic that whatever course the athletic council charts for the football squad, I will follow to the best of my ability, now and in the future just as I have in the past. Pitt is very dear to me, always has been and always will be." He told the Sun-Telegraph: "I believe Pitt should play teams in his own classification; teams that have the same ideals and that operate on the same plane. I am employed here as a football coach...I intend to turn out the best football teams possible while I'm on the job."

Scoring summary

| Quarter | Time | Drive | | | Team | Scoring information | Score | |
| Quarter | Time | Plays | Yards | TOP | Team | Scoring information | Wisconsin | Pittsburgh |
|---|---|---|---|---|---|---|---|---|
| 1 | | 12 | 79 | | Pittsburgh | Marshall Goldberg 6-yard touchdown run, Bill Daddio kick good | 0 | 7 |
| 3 | | 2 | 68 | | Pittsburgh | Marshall Goldberg 63-yard touchdown run, Bill Daddio kick good | 0 | 14 |
| 3 | | 2 | 80 | | Pittsburgh | Dick Cassiano 73-yard touchdown run, Bill Daddio kick good | 0 | 21 |
| "TOP" = time of possession. For other American football terms, see Glossary of American football. | | | | | | | 0 | 21 |

=== Carnegie Tech ===
Week 6: Carnegie Tech at Pitt

| Team | 1 | 2 | 3 | 4 | Total |
|---|---|---|---|---|---|
| Carnegie Tech | 0 | 7 | 0 | 7 | 14 |
| • Pitt | 6 | 3 | 9 | 7 | 25 |

- Date: October 30, 1937
- Location: Pitt Stadium
  Pittsburgh, PA
- Game start: 2:00 p.m.
- Game attendance: 37,500
- Game weather: sunshine
- Referee: Harry O. Dayhoff (Bucknell)

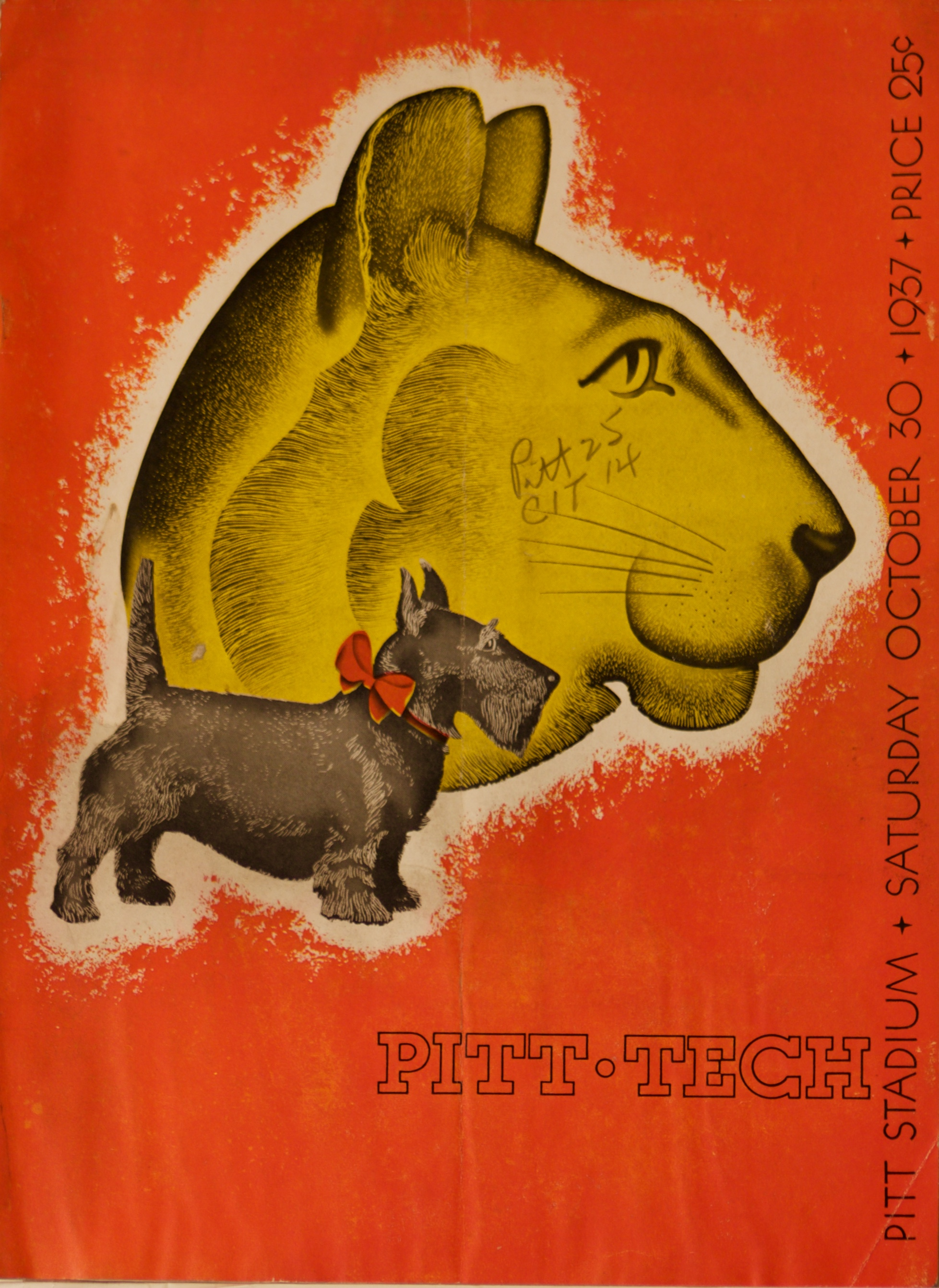
October 30 program for game versus Carnegie Tech

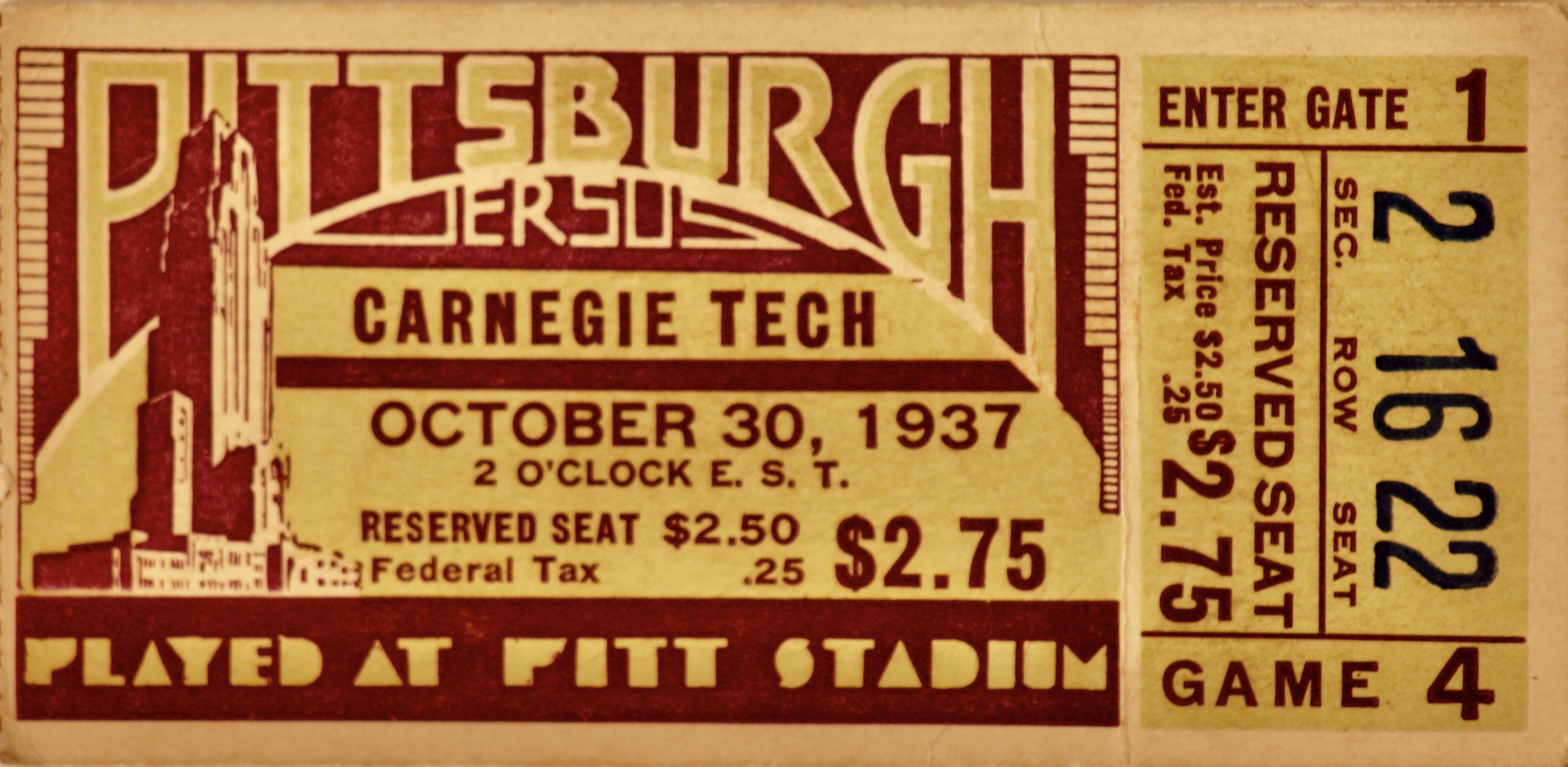
Ticket stub for October 30 game versus Carnegie Tech

The city game with Carnegie Tech took on added significance, as Tech's coaching staff was now made up of former Pitt players and coaches. Head coach Bill Kern and his assistants Edward Baker, Joe Skladany and Frank Kutz all played for Sutherland at Pitt. Bill Kern was on Jock's coaching staff for 7 years (the last three as his main assistant). Eddie Baker assisted backfield coaching for 5 years. The Tartans were only 1–3 on the season, but their lone victory was a 9–6 upset over Notre Dame. Coach Kern told The Pitt News: "Playing against Pitt will feel very strange. The Panthers are better this year and we are obviously weaker. We'll be satisfied to hold them as well as Wisconsin. We hope Pitt wins every game – but this one." Pitt led the all-time series dating back to 1906 18–4–1.

Coach Sutherland rested end Bill Daddio and halfback Marshall Goldberg. Both players were nursing leg injuries and Sutherland wanted them 100% for Notre Dame.

The Panthers prevailed 25–14, despite losing 6 fumbles and giving up their first points of the season. The Panthers scored first after recovering a blocked punt on the Tartan 3-yard line. On third down Frank Patrick went through right tackle for the touchdown. Patrick missed the placement. Pitt led 6–0. Late in the first quarter, Harold Stebbins fumbled and Tech recovered on the Pitt 20-yard line. The Tartan offense gained nothing on first down as the quarter came to a close. On the first play of the second stanza, Peter Moroz threw a touchdown pass to Robert Howarth for the first points scored against Pitt. Coleman Kopcsak added the extra point and Pitt was losing for the first time all season. Late in the half the Panthers gained possession on their own 43-yard line and sustained a 10-play 40-yard drive to the Tartan 17-yard line. As time expired in the first half, Frank Souchak booted a 25-yard field goal to give the Panthers a 9–7 halftime lead. The Panther offense sustained a 10-play 77-yard scoring drive to start the third period. Patrick ended the drive with a 1-yard plunge and Souchak added the point. The Pitt defense kept the Tartans pinned deep in their territory. Pitt added a safety when, in punt formation, a fumbled Carnegie snap in punt formation rolled into the end zone and was recovered by Tech. Pitt led 18–7. Both coaches substituted freely in the final quarter. Pitt halfback John Urban capped off the Panther scoring with a 27-yard touchdown pass to Edward Spotovich. Souchak added the placement. Tech responded with a 9-play 82-yard sustained drive of their own to score a late touchdown and make the final 25–14.

The Pitt starting lineup for the game against Carnegie Tech was Paul Shaw (left end), Tony Matisi (left tackle), Albin Lezouski (left guard), Don Hensley (center), Steve Petro (right guard), George Delich (right tackle), Fabian Hoffman (right end), John Michelosen (quarterback), Dick Cassiano (left halfback), Harold Stebbins (right halfback) and Frank Patrick (fullback). Substitutes appearing in the game for Pitt were Frank Souchak, Edward Spotovich, Walter Raskowski, Elmer Merkovsky, Robert Dannies, Henry Adams, Dante Dalle Tezze, Harold Klein, James Scarpfin, Ted Schmidt, John Chickerneo, Ben Kish, John Urban, Lawrence Peace, Emil Narick and Bill Stapulis.

Scoring summary

| Quarter | Time | Drive | | | Team | Scoring information | Score | |
| Quarter | Time | Plays | Yards | TOP | Team | Scoring information | Carnegie Tech | Pittsburgh |
|---|---|---|---|---|---|---|---|---|
| 1 | | 3 | 3 | | Pittsburgh | Frank Patrick 1-yard touchdown run, Frank Patrick kick no good | 0 | 6 |
| 2 | | 2 | 20 | | Carnegie Tech | Robert Howarth 20-yard touchdown reception from Peter Moroz, Coleman Kopcsak kick good | 7 | 6 |
| 2 | | 10 | 32 | | Pittsburgh | 25-yard field goal by Frank Souchak | 7 | 9 |
| 3 | | 10 | 77 | | Pittsburgh | Frank Patrick 1-yard touchdown run, Frank Souchak kick good | 7 | 16 |
| 3 | | 4 | -8 | | Pittsburgh | Tech punter Jack Lee fumbled the center snap and recovered it in the end zone for a safety | 7 | 18 |
| 4 | | 3 | 40 | | Pittsburgh | Edward Spotovich 27-yard touchdown reception from John Urban, Frank Souchak kick good | 7 | 25 |
| 4 | | 9 | 82 | | Carnegie Tech | Eugene Rosenthal 12-yard touchdown reception from John Grad, Merlyn Condit kick good | 14 | 25 |
| "TOP" = time of possession. For other American football terms, see Glossary of American football. | | | | | | | 14 | 25 |

=== At Notre Dame ===
Week 7: Pitt at Notre Dame

| Team | 1 | 2 | 3 | 4 | Total |
|---|---|---|---|---|---|
| • Pitt | 0 | 0 | 0 | 21 | 21 |
| Notre Dame | 0 | 0 | 6 | 0 | 6 |

- Date: November 6, 1937
- Location: Notre Dame Stadium
  South Bend, IN
- Game start: 2:00 p.m.
- Game attendance: 54,309-56,000
- Game weather: clear
- Referee: Frank Lane (Cincinnati)

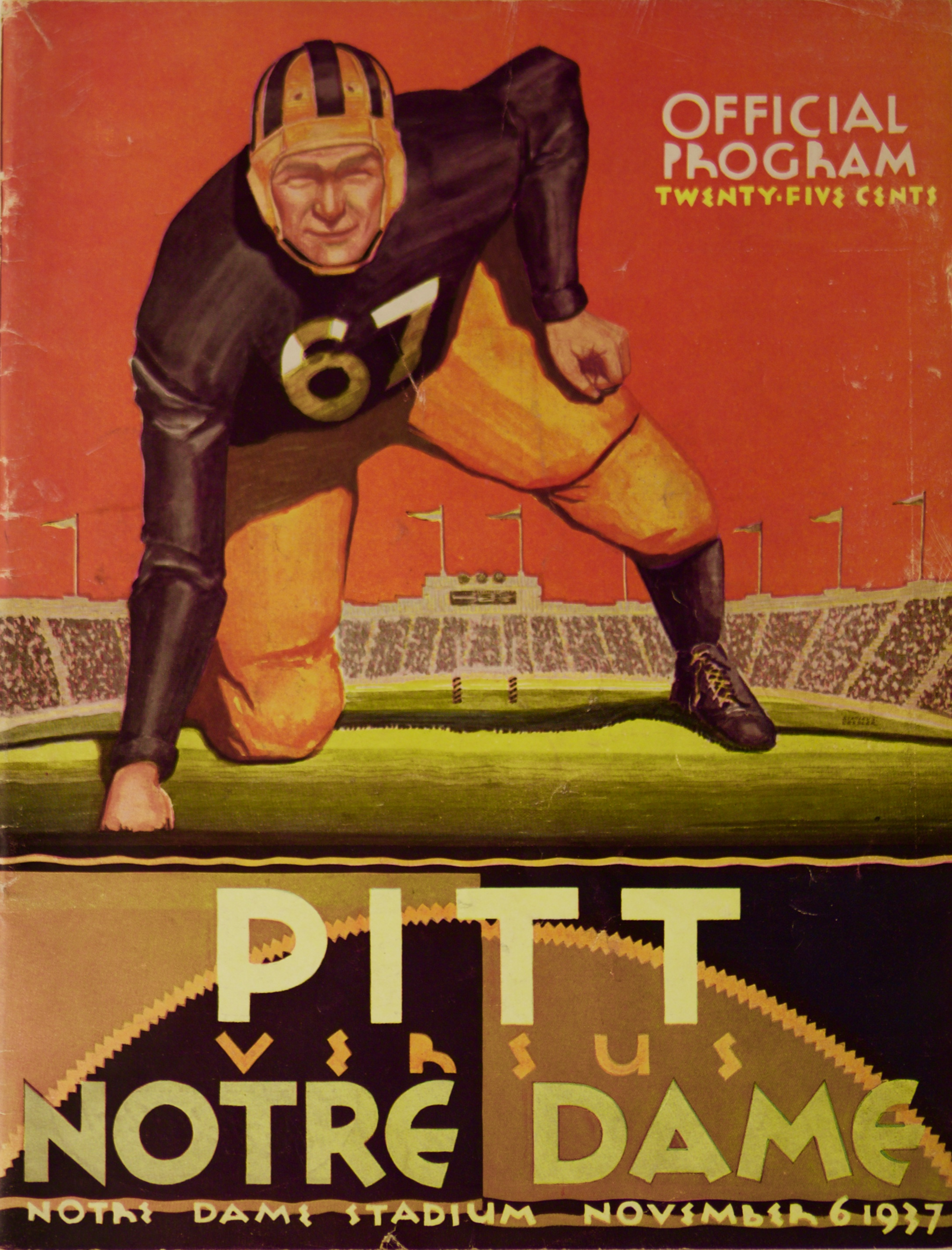
Program for November 6 game versus Notre Dame

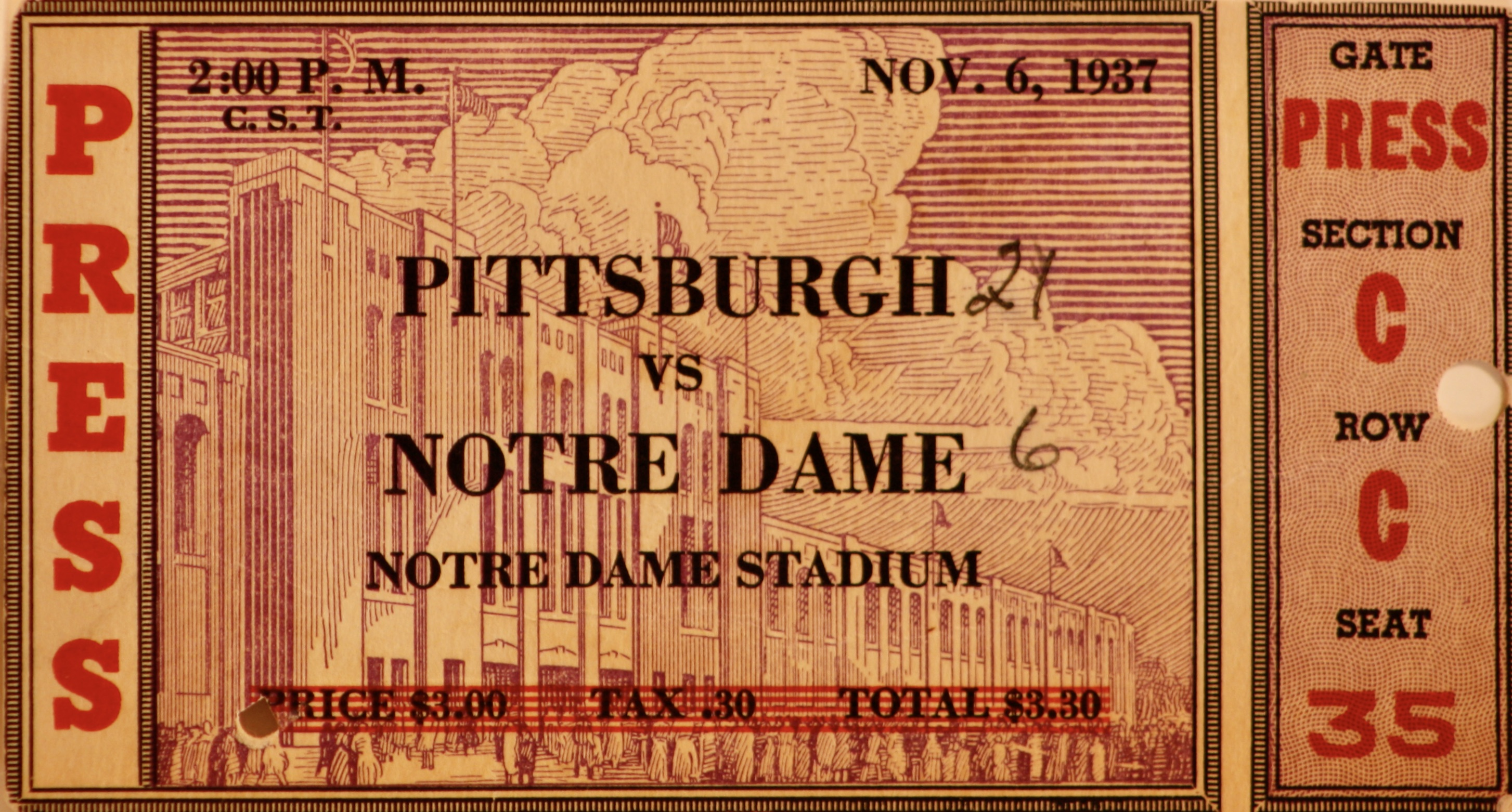
Ticket stub for November 6 game versus Notre Dame

On November 6, 1937, the Panthers traveled to South Bend, IN for the final game of the series that began in 1930. Notre Dame held a slight edge in the overall series (5–4–1) which began in 1909. However, the Panthers won four of the last five games. The Associated Press National poll of newspaper experts had Notre Dame ranked #12 and Pitt #3 for the week prior to the game.

Elmer Layden's Irish were 3–1–1 on the season. They beat Drake (21–0); tied Illinois (0–0); were upset by Carnegie Tech (9–7); came from behind to beat Navy (9–7); and beat Minnesota (7–6). End Chuck Sweeney and tackle Ed Beinor received first team All-America recognition, while guard Joe Ruetz and quarterback Andy Puplis garnered third team mention. Jack Ledden of The South Bend Tribune noted: "The general feeling among the Notre Dame boys is one of revenge. Like an elephant, they never forgot the physical beating they took in Pittsburgh last year and they want a chance to square things."

On Friday morning, the Panther squad of 34 arrived in South Bend, IN. They bused 11 miles to the Four Flags Hotel in Niles, MI, where they stayed until noon on Saturday, when they were bused to the stadium. Halfback Marshall Goldberg and end Frank Souchak were back in the starting lineup for the Panthers.

In front of a capacity crowd of 56,000, the Panthers notched Sutherland's win number 100 as Pitt coach with a come from behind 21–6 victory. Notre Dame was held to 3 first downs (one the result of back-to-back offside penalties) and 97 total yards from scrimmage. The Panthers gained 328 yards from scrimmage and earned 12 first downs. The first half was a scoreless punting duel. Early in the third quarter Pitt botched a punt that traveled 1-yard and Notre Dame gained possession on the Panther 49-yard line. On second down from the 47-yard line, Jack McCarthy threw a touchdown pass to a wide-open Andy Puplis. Puplis missed the placement. Notre Dame led 6–0 for 11 minutes. Late in the quarter, Pitt gained possession on their own 33-yard line and the rally began. The Panther offense advanced the ball 67 yards in 9 plays with Frank Patrick scoring on a 1-yard plunge to tie the game. Frank Souchak put the Panthers ahead by kicking the extra point. Two minutes later, the Panther offense drove 66 yards in 7 plays. Harold Stebbins received a hand-off from Marshall Goldberg on a reverse and ran the last 21 yards unmolested into the end zone. Souchak added the point after and Pitt led 14–6. Notre Dame went to the air and Pitt halfback Harold Stebbins intercepted on the Notre Dame 43-yard line. Six plays later Patrick went through center for 21 yards and the final touchdown. Souchak tacked on the extra point and Pitt evened the all-time series against the Irish 5–5–1.

Coach Sutherland was modest: "I'm afraid those long runs minimized the great game which Notre Dame played. We were fortunate to break Stebbins and Patrick loose for the Irish line played a tight type of defensive ball and we took nothing for granted. We had to fight for every yard we made and no team gave us more trouble than Notre Dame." Coach Layden praised his team: "Pitt today had a great line and the fact that our boys were able to hold the Panthers scoreless for three quarters speaks for itself."

Notre Dame finished the season 6–2–1 and ranked # 9 in the final Associated Press poll. Notre Dame ended the series with Pitt because they felt they were playing a team for hire.

The Pitt starting lineup for the game against Notre Dame was Paul Shaw (left end), Tony Matisi (left tackle), Albin Lezouski (left guard), Don Hensley (center), Steve Petro (right guard), George Delich (right tackle), Frank Souchak (right end), John Michelosen (quarterback), Marshall Goldberg (left halfback), Harold Stebbins (right halfback) and Frank Patrick (fullback). Substitutes appearing in the game for Pitt were Edward Spotovich, Elmer Merkovsky, Walter Raskowski, Albert Walton, Henry Adams, Robert Dannies, Dante Dalle Tezze, Harold Klein, Ted Schmidt, Ralph Hafer, Fabian Hoffman, John Chickerneo, Ben Kish, Dick Cassiano, Clement Campal, Lawrence Peace and Bill Stapulis.

Scoring summary

| Quarter | Time | Drive | | | Team | Scoring information | Score | |
| Quarter | Time | Plays | Yards | TOP | Team | Scoring information | Pittsburgh | Notre Dame |
|---|---|---|---|---|---|---|---|---|
| 3 | | 2 | 49 | | Notre Dame | Andy Puplis 47-yard touchdown reception from Jack McCarthy, Andy Puplis kick no good | 0 | 6 |
| 4 | | 9 | 67 | | Pittsburgh | Frank Patrick 1-yard touchdown run, Frank Souchak kick good | 7 | 6 |
| 4 | | 7 | 66 | | Pittsburgh | Harold Stabbins 27-yard touchdown run, Frank Souchak kick good | 14 | 6 |
| 4 | | 6 | 43 | | Pittsburgh | Frank Patrick 21-yard touchdown run, Frank Souchak kick good | 21 | 6 |
| "TOP" = time of possession. For other American football terms, see Glossary of American football. | | | | | | | 21 | 6 |

=== Nebraska ===
Week 8: Nebraska at Pitt

| Team | 1 | 2 | 3 | 4 | Total |
|---|---|---|---|---|---|
| Nebraska | 0 | 0 | 7 | 0 | 7 |
| • Pitt | 0 | 0 | 0 | 13 | 13 |

- Date: November 13, 1937
- Location: Pitt Stadium
  Pittsburgh, PA
- Game start: 2:00 p.m.
- Game attendance: 71,267
- Game weather: clear and dry
- Referee: Dexter Very (Penn State)

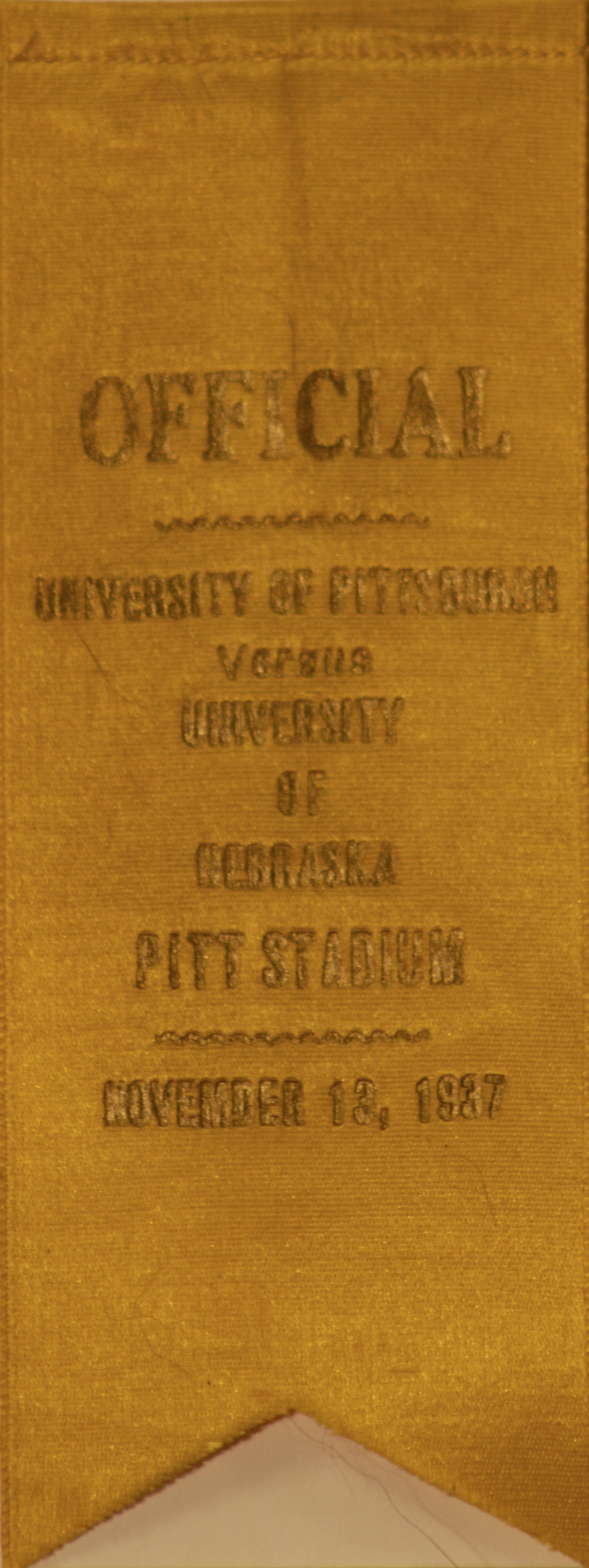
Official's badge for November 13 game versus Nebraska

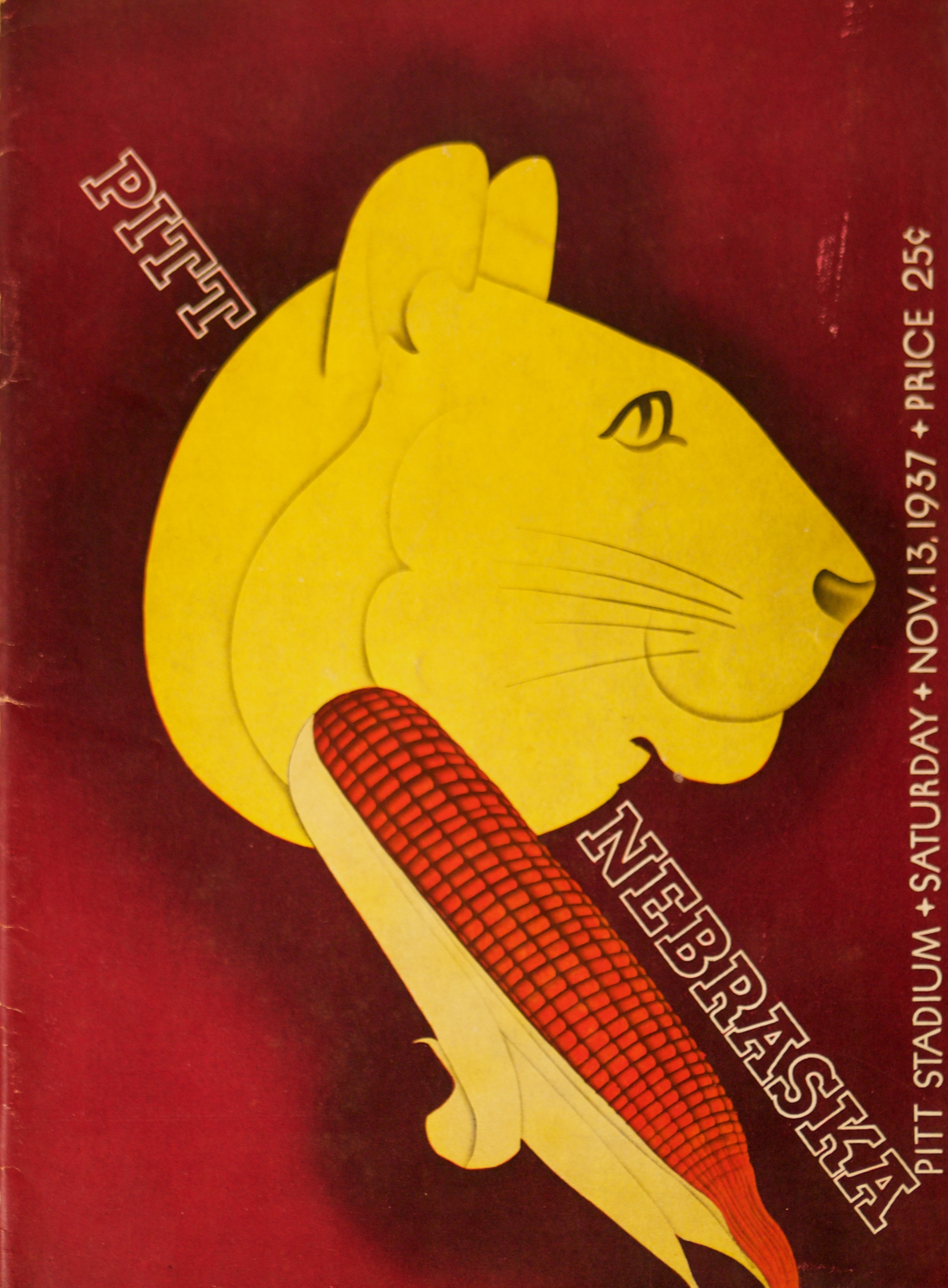
Program for November 13 game versus Nebraska

On November 13, the undefeated Nebraska Cornhuskers hoped to snap their 10-game winless streak against the Panthers. First-year coach Biff Jones's Huskers arrived in Pittsburgh with a 4–0–2 record and #11 ranking in the Associated Press weekly poll. The Husker line was anchored by four All-Americans – tackles Fred Shirey and Ted Doyle, end Elmer Dohrmann, and center Charles Brock. Nebraska assistant coach W. H. Browne, who scouted the Panthers, felt: "Pitt can be beaten, but it will take 60 minutes of alert aggressive football. We can't expect to win if we let up a single minute."

The Associated Press weekly football poll ranked the Panthers #1.

After reaching 100 victories as Pitt coach, Sutherland discussed his favorite part of coaching with The Lincoln Star: "I don't care what the papers and sportswriters say about me, about what I've done or what I haven't done, about the glory and the romance of football. It's these kids that play under me that count. They're wonderful boys, all of them. It's working with them that has made football mean so much to me...Games? There's little difference between a game won and a game lost. It's the playing that counts."

In front of the second largest crowd (71,267) to watch a football game in western Pennsylvania, the Pitt Panther eleven continued its mastery over the Nebraska Cornhuskers, with another come from behind fourth quarter rally, by the score of 13–7. For the first three quarters the Panther offense could not sustain a drive. The Pitt defense held the Nebraska offense to minus 9 yards and 2 first downs for the entire game, but their punter Johnny Howell, who averaged more than 46 yards per punt, continually kept the Panthers starting deep in their own territory. Late in the third period, Howell punted 72 yards to pin the Panthers on their own 15-yard line. The Panthers were forced to punt. Harris Andrews caught the ball on his own 40-yard line and ran to the right. He lateraled to Jack Dodd heading left and the Husker interference escorted him into the end zone. Lowell English added the placement. Pitt trailed going into the last quarter for the second week in a row. After trading punts, the Panthers gained possession on their 20-yard line. The Pitt offense sustained a 13 play, 80-yard drive that ended on a Frank Patrick 1 yard plunge over right tackle for the touchdown. Frank Souchak's placement hit the upright and Pitt trailed 7–6. Pitt's kick-off went out of bounds, which gave Nebraska possession on their 35-yard line. On third down fullback Bill Andreson fumbled, and Pitt's Albin Lezouski recovered on the Husker 33-yard line. On the sixth play Bill Stapulis went through the middle for Pitt's second touchdown. Souchak's placement was good and the #1 team in the country was 7–0–1.

Biff Jones congratulated the Panthers: "Jock has a great team. It was a hard one to lose, but that is the best team we have faced this season and that was the hardest battle we have been in this year. When the Pitt offensive started to click, it was grand. They have the stuff." Sutherland answered: "The battle was even tougher than the fight with the Irish at South Bend last Saturday. I am convinced that you cannot play teams like Notre Dame and Nebraska on successive Saturdays and keep the players in top shape. Our team was still feeling the effects of last Saturday which is why they played loggy football in the first half. I'll take my hat off to the second team. We had to use it throughout the second period in order to rest up the other fellows, and the youngsters were great. They had wonderful spirit. I was tickled the way the crowd acted. The fans certainly did enjoy the game."

Nebraska finished their season with a 6–1–2 record and captured the Big 6 Conference crown. They placed #11 in the final Associated Press football poll.

The Pitt starting lineup for the game against Nebraska was Frank Souchak (left end), Tony Matisi (left tackle), Albin Lezouski (left guard), Don Hensley (center), Steve Petro (right guard), George Delich (right tackle), Fabian Hoffman (right end), John Michelosen (quarterback), Marshall Goldberg (left halfback), Harold Stebbins (right halfback) and Frank Patrick (fullback). Substitutes appearing in the game for Pitt were Bill Daddio, Paul Shaw, Elmer Merkovsky, Dante Delle Tezze, Ted Schmidt, Walter Raskowski, Henry Adams, John Chickerneo, Ben Kish, Dick Cassiano, John Urban and Bill Stapulis.

Scoring summary

| Quarter | Time | Drive | | | Team | Scoring information | Score | |
| Quarter | Time | Plays | Yards | TOP | Team | Scoring information | Nebraska | Pittsburgh |
|---|---|---|---|---|---|---|---|---|
| 3 | | | | | Nebraska | Punt returned 60 yards for touchdown by Jack Dodd, Lowell English kick good | 7 | 0 |
| 4 | | 13 | 80 | | Pittsburgh | Frank Patrick 1-yard touchdown run, Frank Souchak kick no good, hit the upright | 7 | 6 |
| 4 | | 6 | 33 | | Pittsburgh | Bill Stapulis 1-yard touchdown run, Frank Souchak kick good | 7 | 13 |
| "TOP" = time of possession. For other American football terms, see Glossary of American football. | | | | | | | 7 | 13 |

=== Penn State ===
Week 9: Penn State at Pitt

| Team | 1 | 2 | 3 | 4 | Total |
|---|---|---|---|---|---|
| Penn State | 0 | 0 | 7 | 0 | 7 |
| • Pitt | 14 | 7 | 0 | 7 | 28 |

- Date: November 20, 1937
- Location: Pitt Stadium
  Pittsburgh, PA
- Game start: 2:00 p.m.
- Game attendance: 19,936
- Game weather: snow
- Referee: Harry O. Dayoff (Bucknell)

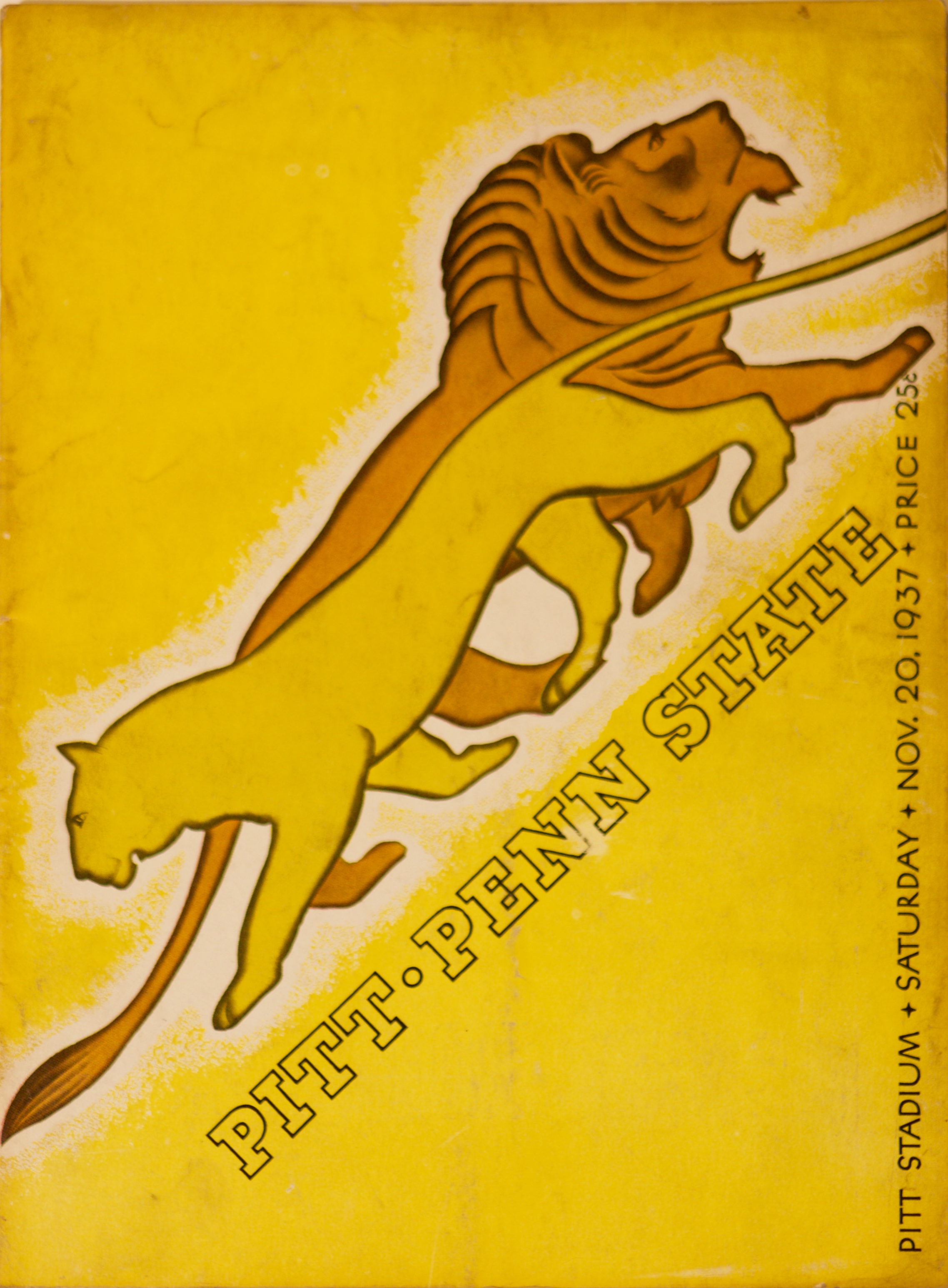
Program for the November 20 game versus Penn State

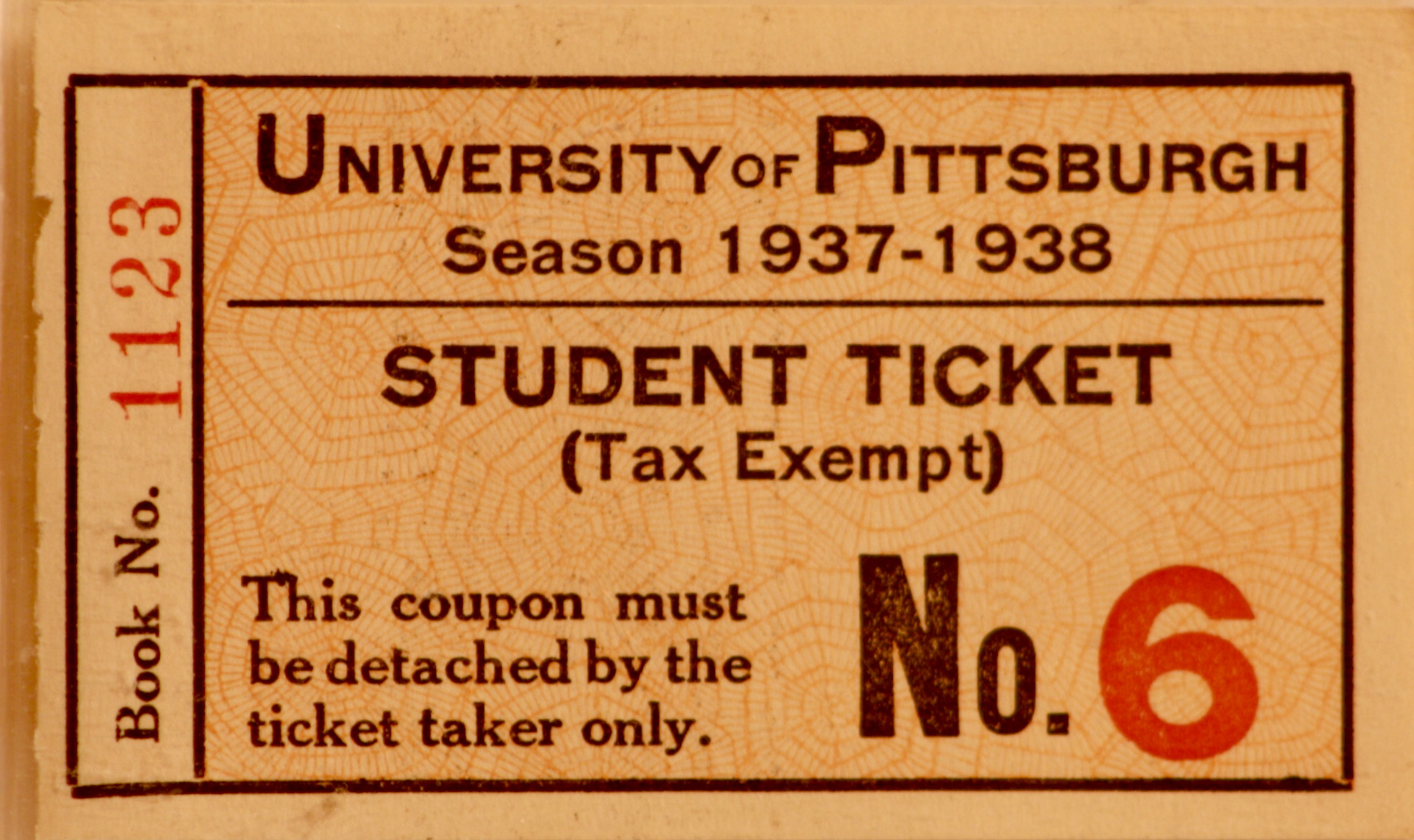
Ticket stub for November 20 game versus Penn State

On November 20, the Penn State Nittany Lions tried to break a 12-game losing streak to Pitt by gaining their first victory over the Panthers since 1919. Coach Bob Higgins' eight year record was 21–33–3 and none of his teams had finished above .500. This year's squad was 5–2 and hoped to finish 6–2 by knocking off the #1 Panthers. Harry Keck of the Sun-Telegraph reported: "As one State man put it, the seniors on the State team are tired of making 'good showings' against Pitt, and believe they're about to win."

The veteran Panther squad had 20 members who would be suiting up for the final time at Pitt Stadium. Seniors, tackle Tony Matisi and end Frank Souchak, along with underclassmen, halfback Marshall Goldberg and guard Albin Lezouski, were honored before the game for being chosen to the Associated Press All-American list. Coach Sutherland started Ted Schmidt at right tackle in place of George Delich. Otherwise, the lineup was the same that started against Nebraska. Assistant coach Mike Nicksick, who scouted the Lions, noted they were: “a team that loves to gamble, and with the breaks, they'll be hard to beat.”

23,000 fans sat through snow, wind and bitter cold to see Pitt win its last home game of the season 28–7. Pitt scored twice in the first period to set the tone. The Panther defense forced a punt and gained possession on the State 41-yard line. On the eighth play of the drive Frank Patrick plunged over center from the 1-yard marker for the touchdown. Frank Souchak kicked the point after and Pitt led 7–0. State returned the kick-off to their own 46-yard line. On third down Pitt center Don Hensley intercepted Steve Rollins' pass on the Pitt 44-yard line and returned it to the State 49-yard line. The drive took six plays. Marshall Goldberg carried the ball through left tackle from the 1-yard line for the second score. Souchak added the point after. Sutherland played the second team for most of the second and third quarters. Early in the second period the Pitt defense forced a punt and took possession on their own 20-yard line. On second down, Dick Cassiano raced 79 yards around left end for the third Panther score of the first half. Elmer Merkovsky kicked the point after, and Pitt led 21–0 at halftime. Penn State got on the scoreboard in the third quarter. Pitt guard Dante Dalle Tezze fumbled a punt and State recovered on the Panther 24-yard line. On third down, Wendell Wear threw a 29-yard touchdown pass to Sidney Alter. Ben Pollack kicked the point after, and the Pitt lead was cut to 21–7. The Pitt regulars played the fourth quarter and sustained a 10-play 54-yard drive for their final score. Goldberg scored over left guard from the 7-yard line. Frank Patrick added the extra point, and Pitt led the all-time series 22–13–2.

State coach Higgins was impressed: "It's just about the finest thing I have ever seen in the way of a college football team. In fact, I have never seen any better Pitt, or for that matter, any better school outfit."

The Pitt starting lineup for the game against Penn State was Bill Daddio (left end), Tony Matisi (left tackle), Albin Lezouski (left guard), Don Hensley (center), Steve Petro (right guard), Ted Schmidt (right tackle), Frank Souchak (right end), John Michelosen (quarterback), Marshall Goldberg (left halfback), Harold Stebbins (right halfback) and Frank Patrick (fullback). Substitutes appearing in the game for Pitt were Paul Shaw, Fabian Hoffman, Elmer Merkovsky, Ben Asavich, James Scarfpin, Walter Raskowski, Henry Adams, Robert Dannies, Dante Dalle Tezze, George Delich, Ralph Hafer, Edward Spotovich, John Dickinson, John Chickerneo, Ben Kish, Dick Cassiano, Emil Narick, John Urban, Lawrence Peace, Bill Stapulis and William Farkas.

Scoring summary

| Quarter | Time | Drive | | | Team | Scoring information | Score | |
| Quarter | Time | Plays | Yards | TOP | Team | Scoring information | Penn State | Pittsburgh |
|---|---|---|---|---|---|---|---|---|
| 1 | | 8 | 41 | | Pittsburgh | Frank Patrick 1-yard touchdown run, Frank Souchak kick good | 0 | 7 |
| 1 | | 6 | 49 | | Pittsburgh | Marshall Goldberg 1-yard touchdown run, Frank Souchak kick good | 0 | 14 |
| 2 | | 2 | 80 | | Pittsburgh | Dick Cassiano 79-yard touchdown run, Elmer Merkovsky kick good | 0 | 21 |
| 3 | | 3 | 24 | | Penn State | Sidney Alter 29-yard touchdown reception from Wendell Wear, Ben Pollack kick good | 7 | 21 |
| 4 | | 10 | 54 | | Pittsburgh | Marshall Goldberg 7-yard touchdown run, Frank Patrick kick good | 7 | 28 |
| "TOP" = time of possession. For other American football terms, see Glossary of American football. | | | | | | | 7 | 28 |

=== At Duke ===
Week 10: Pitt at Duke

| Team | 1 | 2 | 3 | 4 | Total |
|---|---|---|---|---|---|
| • Pitt | 3 | 7 | 0 | 0 | 10 |
| Duke | 0 | 0 | 0 | 0 | 0 |

- Date: November 27, 1937
- Location: Duke Stadium
  Durham, NC
- Game start: 2:00 p.m.
- Game attendance: 36,165
- Game weather: rain
- Referee: Ted Arnold (Auburn)

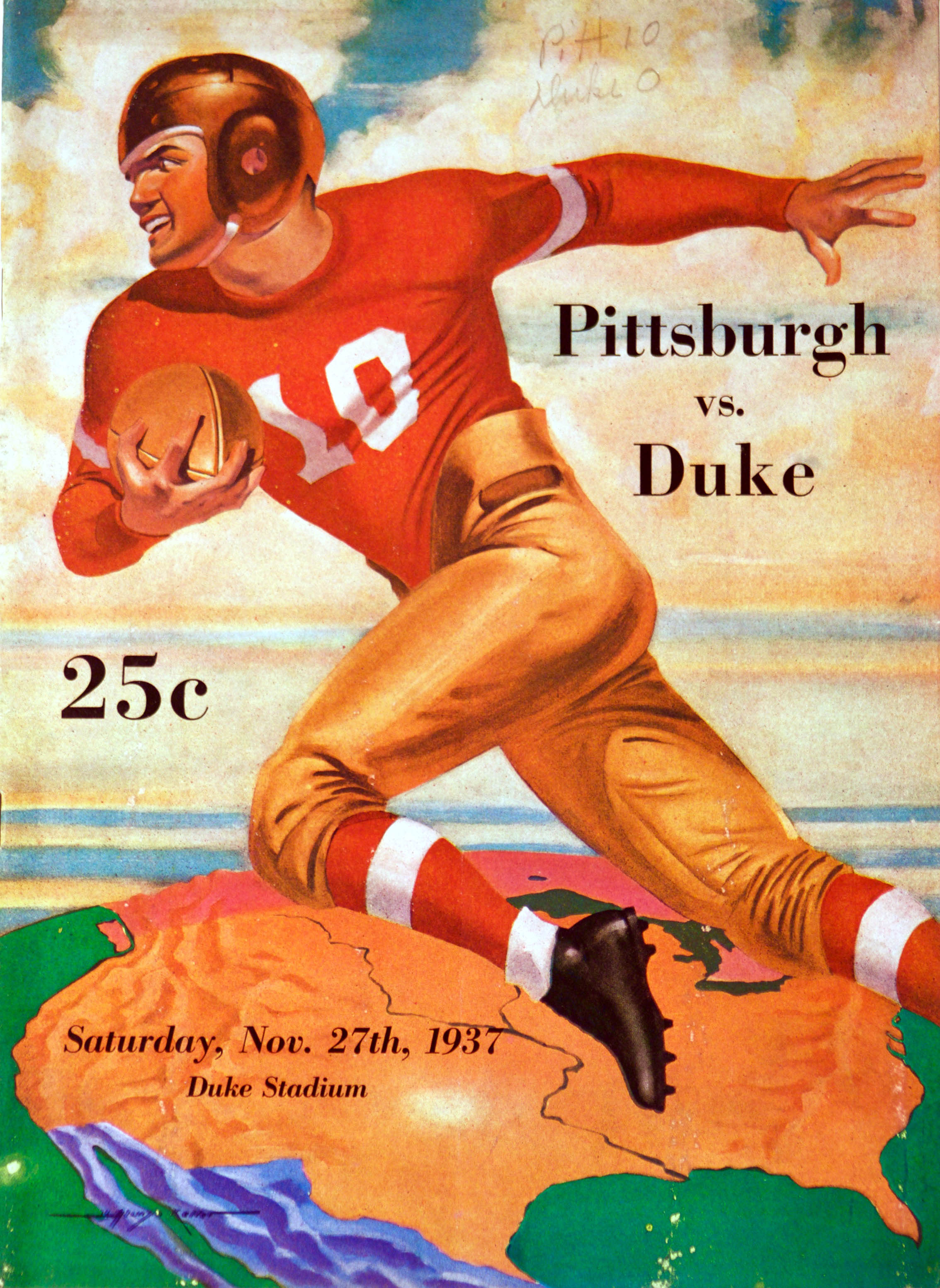
Program for November 27 game versus Duke

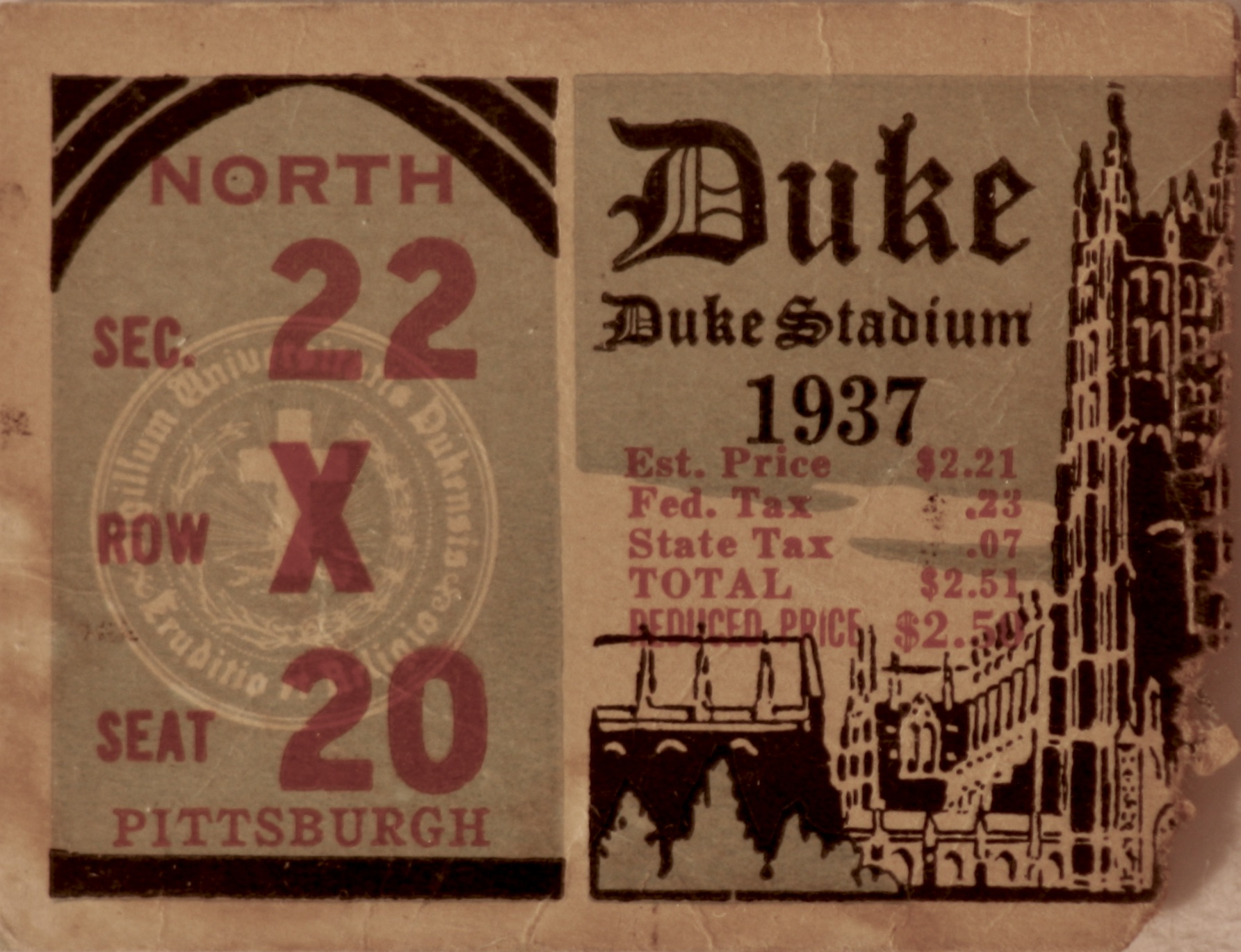
Ticket stub for November 27 game versus Duke

On November 27, the Panthers finished their season against the Duke Blue Devils in Durham, North Carolina. Sutherland's Panthers first traveled below the Mason-Dixon line in 1929 to help dedicate Duke Stadium. At that time, the Blue Devils were coached by James Dehart, who was Pitt's first 4-letterman. The Panthers won the game handily 52–7, and Duke finished their season with a 4–6 record. The following season Dehart led them to a 8–1–2 record, but he was replaced by former Alabama coach Wallace Wade for the 1931 season. Wade led Alabama to 3 National Championships and 3 Rose Bowl invitations, winning 2 and tying 1, during his 8-year tenure. In his first 6 years at Duke, his Devils captured the Southern Conference crown three times. The 1937 team was 7–1–1 with a scoreless tie against Tennessee and 14–6 loss to North Carolina the only missteps on its record. The Devils were led at quarterback by All-American candidate Elmore Hackney.

On Thanksgiving the Panthers' 35-member traveling squad boarded the train at 1 PM. At 9 PM they had a 2-hour layover in Washington D. C., and on Friday morning at 8:30 AM they arrived in Chapel Hill, NC. Sutherland held a practice at Duke Stadium in the afternoon. The Pittsburgh Post-Gazette reported: "Sutherland has his boys well prepared for the encounter and the Panthers will be ready both physically and mentally for one of the best games of the day Saturday."

Jess Carver of the Sun-Telegraph wrote: "Pitt's Golden Panthers of the gridiron wrote a very acceptable final chapter to their 1937 football story here today by whipping a rugged band of Duke University Blue Devils, 10 to 0... " Late in the first quarter, Pitt fullback Frank Patrick punted to Duke quarterback Elmore Hackney. He fumbled the wet ball and Pitt end Frank Souchak recovered on the Duke 20-yard line. The Panther offense only gained 5 yards on 3 plays, but on fourth down Souchak booted a 23-yard field goal to give the Panthers an early lead. Sutherland sent in the second string for the second quarter. On an exchange of punts, Pitt's Bill Stapulis punted to Hackney who fumbled for a second time. Panther Edward Spotovich recovered on the Duke 14-yard line. On first down Dick Cassiano went through left tackle for the touchdown. Souchak added the point after and Pitt led 10 to 0. The Duke offense penetrated to the Pitt 12-yard line late in the half, but lost the ball on a fumble. In the second half the Duke offense advanced to the Pitt 25-yard line, but lost the ball on an interception by Pitt guard Steve Petro. The remainder of the game was a punting duel for field position.

The Pitt starting lineup for the game against Duke was Bill Daddio (left end), Tony Matisi (left tackle), Albin Lezouski (left guard), Don Hensley (center), Steve Petro (right guard), Ted Schmidt (right tackle), Frank Souchak (right end), John Michelosen (quarterback), Marshall Goldberg (left halfback), Harold Stebbins (right halfback) and Frank Patrick (fullback). Substitutes appearing in the game for Pitt were Fabian Hoffman, Paul Shaw, Edward Spotovich, Ralph Hafer, George Delich, Elmer Merkovsky, Walter Raskowski, Dante Dalle Tezze, Henfy Adams, John Chickerneo, John Urban, Dick Cassiano and Bill Stapulis.

Scoring summary

| Quarter | Time | Drive | | | Team | Scoring information | Score | |
| Quarter | Time | Plays | Yards | TOP | Team | Scoring information | Pittsburgh | Duke |
|---|---|---|---|---|---|---|---|---|
| 1 | | 4 | 5 | | Pittsburgh | 23-yard field goal by Frank Souchak | 3 | 0 |
| 2 | | 1 | 14 | | Pittsburgh | Dick Cassiano 14-yard touchdown run, Frank Souchak kick good | 10 | 0 |
| "TOP" = time of possession. For other American football terms, see Glossary of American football. | | | | | | | 10 | 0 |

== Individual scoring summary ==
1937 Pittsburgh Panthers scoring summary
| Player | Touchdowns | Extra points | Field goals | Safety | Points |
|---|---|---|---|---|---|
| Frank Patrick | 8 | 1 | 0 | 0 | 49 |
| Richard Cassiano | 7 | 0 | 0 | 0 | 42 |
| Marshall Goldberg | 6 | 0 | 0 | 0 | 36 |
| Harold Stebbins | 3 | 0 | 0 | 0 | 18 |
| Frank Souchak | 0 | 10 | 2 | 0 | 16 |
| William Stapulis | 2 | 0 | 0 | 0 | 12 |
| John Urban | 1 | 0 | 0 | 0 | 6 |
| John Dickinson | 1 | 0 | 0 | 0 | 6 |
| Edward Spotovich | 1 | 0 | 0 | 0 | 6 |
| Elmer Mercovsky | 0 | 5 | 0 | 0 | 5 |
| William Daddio | 0 | 4 | 0 | 0 | 4 |
| William Farkas | 0 | 1 | 0 | 0 | 1 |
| Team | 0 | 0 | 0 | 1 | 2 |
| Totals | 29 | 21 | 2 | 1 | 203 |

== Postseason ==
The Pitt Panthers were voted National Champions by the following selectors: Associated Press, Billingsley, Boand, Dickinson, Football Research, Houlgate, Liktenhous, National Championship Foundation, Poling, Sagarin, Sagarin (ELO-Chess) and Williamson. The Cal Bears were voted National Champions by Dunkel and Helms.

On November 29, Pitt varsity right end, Frank Souchak, received the Most Valuable Football Player in the City trophy from the Curbstone Coaches Association at their annual banquet in the Hotel Keystone.

On November 30, Pitt was awarded the August V. Lambert Memorial Trophy, emblematic of the eastern gridiron championship, for the second season in a row. At the Varsity Letterman's Dinner on December 13, Victor A. Lambert, the donor, presented the trophy to the University. The Panthers also received the Chamber of Commerce Cup, presented by William S. Haddock, and the City of Pittsburgh award, presented by Mayor Cornelius D. Scully.

In late November, Percy St. Clair Browne, custodian of athletic equipment at Pitt for the previous 12 years, resigned and moved to Boston to live with his son.

Marshall Goldberg came in third place in the Heisman Trophy voting with 211 votes. Clint Frank of Yale won with 524 votes and Byron "Whizzer" White placed second with 264 votes.

Unlike the previous year, the Pitt Panthers were the favored opponent to be invited to the Rose Bowl by numerous sports writers on the west coast. In a poll conducted by the Pittsburgh Post-Gazette - George T. Davis of the Los Angeles Herald Express, Royal Brougham of the Seattle Post Intelligencer, Jack James of the Los Angeles Examiner, L. G. Gregory of the Portland Oregonian, Art Rosenbaum of the San Francisco Chronicle and Ned Cronin of the Los Angeles Evening News all agreed that Pitt was the best choice. The Pitt football team felt otherwise. Athletic Director James Hagan stated "We had invitations from the Sugar Bowl and the Cotton Bowl which we wanted to place before the boys, so we tossed in the Rose Bowl for consideration too." The players voted no to any Bowl participation in a closed door, player-only meeting arranged by Hagan and business manager John Weber. The Panther squad was still festering hard feelings about the way they were treated on the previous Bowl trip, and rumors swirled about their demands made for spending money, vacation time and taking the entire squad on the trip not being addressed. The team was also disturbed that Coach Sutherland had not been informed of the meeting. Havey Boyle of the Post-Gazette wrote that John Weber was not pleased that Don Harrison had to resign earlier in the year and his snub of not telling the coach was a form of payback. Coach Sutherland was his gracious self: "I did not know that the meeting to vote on post-season bids was being held yesterday. However, I believe that the decision should be left entirely up to the players, themselves. I have not talked to any of the boys about the matter at all." Thus, Pitt gained the distinction of being the first team to turn down the Rose Bowl.

Quarterback John Michelosen and end Frank Souchak accepted invitations to play for the East squad in the annual East-West Shrine Game on New Year's Day in San Francisco.

== All-Americans ==
- **Marshall Goldberg** (halfback) – First team Newspaper Enterprise Association; First team United Press International; First team International News Service First team Associated Press First team Walter Camp Football Foundation First team Collier's; First team North American Alliance; First team Fox Movietone News; First team All-American Board; First team Hearst Papers; Paramount News; Collyer's Eye; First team Larry Kelly; Second team New York Sun.
- **Tony Matisi** (tackle) – First team Associated Press First team Walter Camp Football Foundation; First team New York World-Telegram; First team North American Newspaper Alliance; First team Fox Movietone news; First team All-American Board; First team Paramount News; First team Collyer's Eye; First team Larry Kelly; Second team New York Sun; Second team Newspaper Enterprise Association; Second team United Press International; Second team International News Service; Honorable mention Collier's and Hearst Papers.
- Frank Souchak (end) – First team New York World-Telegram; First team New York Sun; Second team Larry Kelly; Second team United Press International; Second team Newspaper Enterprise Association; Second team International News Service; Honorable mention - Hearst Papers, Associated Press, North American Newspaper Alliance, Collier's and All-American Board.
- Albin Lezouski (guard) – Second team Associated Press; Second team Larry Kelly; Honorable mention - Newspaper Enterprise Association, United Press and North American Newspaper Alliance.
- Harold Stebbins (halfback) - Second team Larry Kelly; Honorable mention - United Press, Associated Press and All-America Board.
- William Daddio (end) – Third team United Press International; Honorable mention – Associated Press and All-America Board.
- Frank Patrick (fullback) - Honorable mention - All-America Board, North American Newspaper Alliance, Newspaper Enterprise Association, Associated press and United Press.
- John Michelosen (quarterback) - Honorable mention – Associated Press and All-America Board.
- Don Hensley (center) - Honorable mention - Newspaper Enterprise Association and United Press.
- Dick Cassiano (halfback) - Honorable mention – Associated Press.

*Bold - Consensus All-American

== Team players drafted into the NFL ==
The following players were selected in the 1938 NFL draft.

| Player | Position | Round | Pick | NFL club |
|---|---|---|---|---|
| Frank Patrick | Back | 3 | 20 | Chicago Cardinals |
| Tony Matisi | Tackle | 4 | 29 | Pittsburgh Pirates |
| Frank Souchak | End | 6 | 48 | New York Giants |
| John Michelosen | Back | 12 | 102 | Philadelphia Eagles |
