= John Wallace =

John Wallace may refer to:

== Law and government ==
- John Wallace (Australian politician) (1828–1901), Australian politician
- John Wallace (Canadian politician) (1812–1896), New Brunswick farmer and member of the Canadian House of Commons
- John Wallace (English politician) (1840–1910), British Member of Parliament for Limehouse, 1892–1895
- John Wallace (Florida politician) (1842–1908), Florida Republican politician
- John Wallace (New Zealand judge) (1934–2012), chairman of the Royal Commission on the Electoral System, 1986
- John Wallace (Scottish politician) (1868–1949), Member of Parliament for Dumfermline Burghs
- John Alexander Wallace (1881–1961), Canadian politician
- John Clifford Wallace (born 1928), United States federal judge
- John D. Wallace (born 1949), Canadian politician who served as a Senator for New Brunswick
- John E. Wallace Jr. (born 1942), former New Jersey Supreme Court justice
- John M. Wallace (soldier) (1820–1866), county judge and Indiana military officer during the American Civil War
- John William Wallace (1815–1884), American lawyer
- John Winfield Wallace (1818–1889), US congressman from Pennsylvania
- John M. Wallace (1893–1989), American banker, philanthropist, and politician in Utah

== Sports ==
- John Wallace (American football coach), college football coach, head football coach at Rutgers University (1924–1926)
- John Wallace (American football end) (1904–1981), American football player
- John Wallace (basketball) (born 1974), American basketball player
- John Wallace (cricketer) (1924–2008), South African-born first-class cricketer, who played for Rhodesia
- John Wallace (footballer) (born 1959), Australian footballer for Melbourne
- John Wallace (rower) (born 1962), Canadian rower
- John Wallace (sailor) (1903–1990), American sailor

== Arts ==
- John Wallace (musician) (fl. 1971–present), American bassist and singer
- John Wallace, member of the bands Heavyshift and The Stargazers
- John Bruce Wallace (born 1950), American musician and artist
- John Graham Wallace (born 1966), English author of children's books
- John Wallace (woodcarver), Haida people master carver
- John Wallace (trumpeter) (1949–2026), Scottish musician and arts educator

== Other ==
- John Wallace (bishop) (1654–1733), Scottish Roman Catholic prelate
- John Wallace (murderer) (1896–1950), Georgia landowner and crime lord whose murder of a sharecropper is documented in Murder in Coweta County
- John Findley Wallace (1852–1921), American engineer best known as the Chief Engineer of the Panama Canal between 1904 and 1906
- John Higgins Wallace Jr. (1906–1989), American chemist
- John L. Wallace (born 1956), Canadian medical scientist
- John M. Wallace Jr, American sociologist
- John Michael Wallace (born 1940), American atmospheric scientist
- John-Paul Wallace (born 1976), English chess player
- John Alexander Wallace (British Army officer) (1775–1857)
- John Craig Wallace (1928–2020), Northern Irish horticulturalist and writer

== See also ==
- Jackie Wallace (born 1951), American football player
- Jack Wallace (disambiguation)
- Jonathan Wallace (born 1986), basketball player
- Jonathan H. Wallace (1824–1892), U.S. representative from Ohio
- John Wallis (disambiguation)
- John Wallace Scott (1832–1903), Medal of Honor recipient during the American Civil War
- Wallace (surname)
