= Jack Wallace =

Jack Wallace may refer to:

- Jack Wallace (American football) (1925–1995), American football player and coach
- Jack Wallace (rugby union), English rugby union player
- Jack Wallace (catcher) (1890–1960), Major League Baseball catcher
- Jack Wallace (Negro leagues), American baseball player
- Jack Wallace (actor) (1933–2020), American actor known for his work in theater and film
- Jack Wallace (sailor), British Olympic sailor
- Jack Wallace (sledge hockey) (born 1998), American sledge hockey player

== See also ==
- John Wallace (disambiguation)
