= 1924 Columbia Lions football team =

American college football season

1924 Columbia Lions football
- Conference: Independent
- Record: 5–3–1
- Head coach: Percy Haughton (2nd season; first 5 games); Paul Withington (1st season; final 4 games)
- Captain: Walter Koppisch
- Home stadium: Baker Field, Polo Grounds

1924 Eastern college football independents records
	Conf.			Overall
Team	W	L	T	W		L		T
No. 9 Dartmouth		–		7	–	0	–	1
No. 3 Yale		–		6	–	0	–	2
No. 8 Penn		–		9	–	1	–	1
Rutgers		–		7	–	1	–	1
Bucknell		–		8	–	2	–	0
Lafayette		–		7	–	2	–	0
Washington & Jefferson		–		7	–	2	–	0
Holy Cross		–		7	–	1	–	1
Army		–		5	–	1	–	2
Syracuse		–		8	–	2	–	1
Fordham		–		6	–	2	–	0
Lehigh		–		4	–	1	–	3
Boston College		–		6	–	3	–	0
Penn State		–		6	–	3	–	1
Princeton		–		4	–	2	–	1
Springfield		–		4	–	2	–	1
Columbia		–		5	–	3	–	1
Pittsburgh		–		5	–	3	–	1
NYU		–		4	–	3	–	1
CCNY		–		4	–	3	–	0
Brown		–		5	–	4	–	0
Carnegie Tech		–		5	–	4	–	0
Colgate		–		5	–	4	–	0
Cornell		–		4	–	4	–	0
Harvard		–		4	–	4	–	0
Tufts		–		3	–	4	–	2
Franklin & Marshall		–		3	–	5	–	1
Villanova		–		2	–	5	–	1
Drexel		–		2	–	7	–	0
Vermont		–		2	–	7	–	0
Temple		–		1	–	4	–	0
Boston University		–		1	–	5	–	0
Buffalo		–		1	–	7	–	0
Rankings from Dickinson System

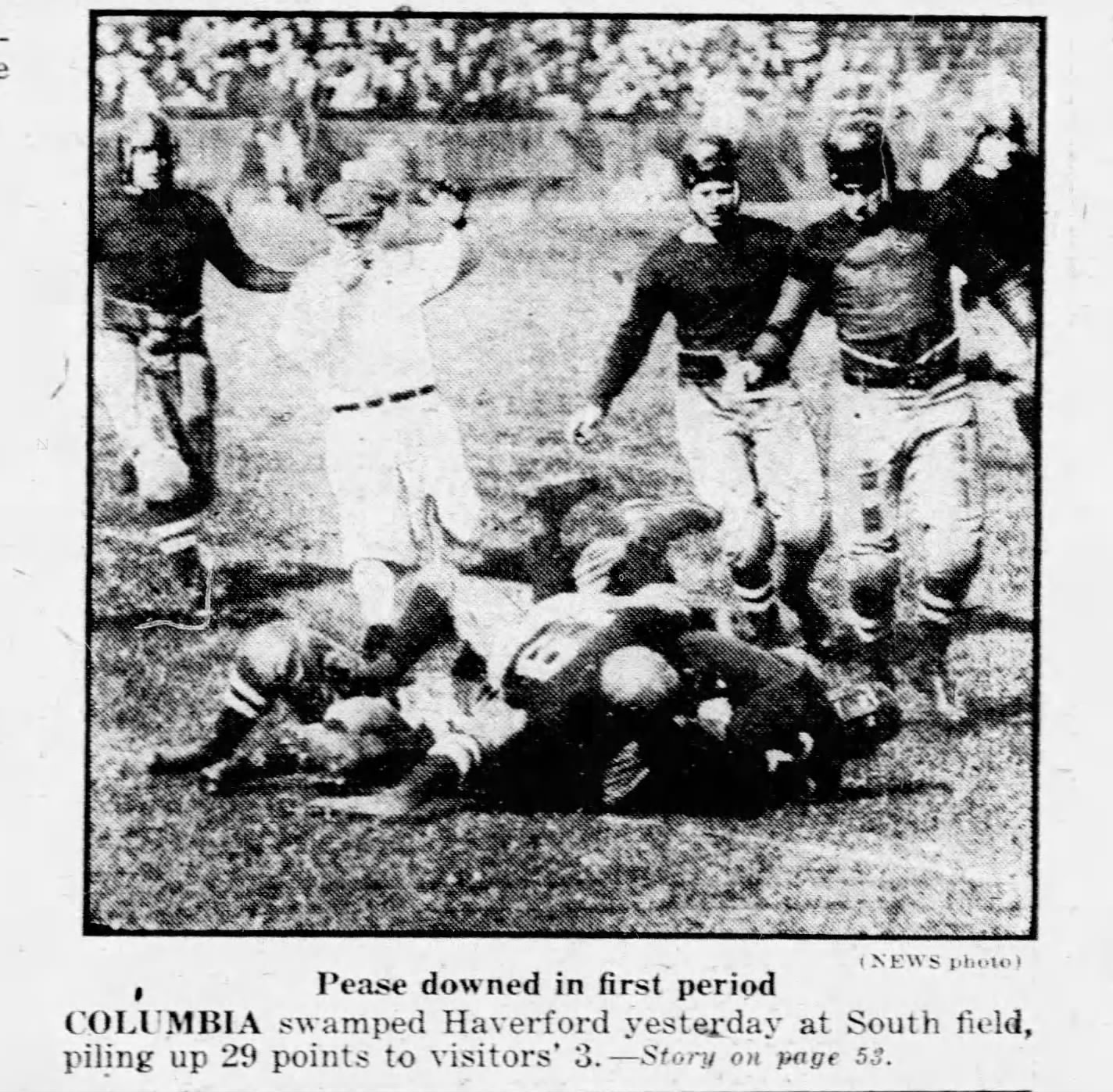
Headline “Columbia swamps Haverford,” (Sept 27, 1924)

The 1924 Columbia Lions football team was an American football team that represented Columbia University as an independent during the 1924 college football season. Under coaches Percy Haughton and Paul Withington, the team compiled a 5–3–1 record and outscored opponents 210 to 53. The team played home games at Baker Field and the Polo Grounds in Upper Manhattan.

== Schedule ==
Date	Opponent	Site	Result	Attendance	Source
September 27	Haverford	Baker Field; New York, NY	W 29–3		
October 4	St. Lawrence	Baker Field; New York, NY	W 52–0		
October 11	Wesleyan	Baker Field; New York, NY	W 35–0		
October 18	at Penn	Franklin Field; Philadelphia, PA	L 7–10	45,000	
October 25	Williams	Baker Field; New York, NY	W 27–3		
November 1	at Cornell	Schoellkopf Field; Ithaca, NY (rivalry)	L 0–14		
November 8	NYU	Baker Field; New York, NY	W 40–0		
November 15	at Army	Michie Stadium; West Point, NY	T 14–14		
November 27	Syracuse	Polo Grounds; New York, NY	L 6–9	45,000	
