= 1924 Springfield Red and White football team =

American college football season

1924 Springfield Red and White football
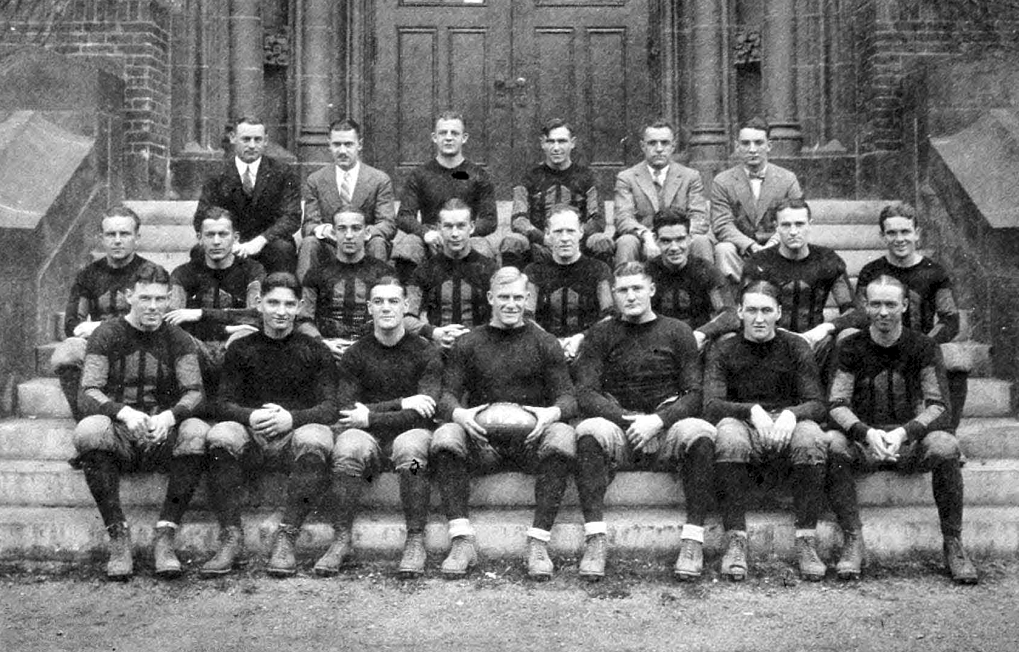
- Conference: Independent
- Record: 4–2–1
- Head coach: John L. Rothacher (1st season)
- Captain: John B. Stoeber
- Home stadium: Pratt Field

1924 Eastern college football independents records
	Conf.			Overall
Team	W	L	T	W		L		T
No. 9 Dartmouth		–		7	–	0	–	1
No. 3 Yale		–		6	–	0	–	2
No. 8 Penn		–		9	–	1	–	1
Rutgers		–		7	–	1	–	1
Bucknell		–		8	–	2	–	0
Lafayette		–		7	–	2	–	0
Washington & Jefferson		–		7	–	2	–	0
Holy Cross		–		7	–	1	–	1
Army		–		5	–	1	–	2
Syracuse		–		8	–	2	–	1
Fordham		–		6	–	2	–	0
Lehigh		–		4	–	1	–	3
Boston College		–		6	–	3	–	0
Penn State		–		6	–	3	–	1
Princeton		–		4	–	2	–	1
Springfield		–		4	–	2	–	1
Columbia		–		5	–	3	–	1
Pittsburgh		–		5	–	3	–	1
NYU		–		4	–	3	–	1
CCNY		–		4	–	3	–	0
Brown		–		5	–	4	–	0
Carnegie Tech		–		5	–	4	–	0
Colgate		–		5	–	4	–	0
Cornell		–		4	–	4	–	0
Harvard		–		4	–	4	–	0
Tufts		–		3	–	4	–	2
Franklin & Marshall		–		3	–	5	–	1
Villanova		–		2	–	5	–	1
Drexel		–		2	–	7	–	0
Vermont		–		2	–	7	–	0
Temple		–		1	–	4	–	0
Boston University		–		1	–	5	–	0
Buffalo		–		1	–	7	–	0
Rankings from Dickinson System

The 1924 Springfield Red and White football team was an American football team that represented Springfield College as an independent during the 1924 college football season. Led by first-year head coach John L. Rothacher, Springfield compiled a record of 4–2–1. John B. Stoeber the team's captain. Springfield played home games at Pratt Field in Springfield, Massachusetts.

== Schedule ==
Date	Opponent	Site	Result	Attendance	Source
September 27	New London Submarine Base	Pratt Field; Springfield, MA	W 6–0		
October 4	at RPI	Troy, NY	L 6–9		
October 11	St. John's	Pratt Field; Springfield, MA	W 2–0		
October 18	at Vermont	Centennial Field; Burlington, VT	W 7–0		
November 1	Connecticut	Pratt Field; Springfield, MA	T 0–0	4,000	
November 8	Providence College	Pratt Field; Springfield, MA	W 21–0		
November 15	at Colgate	Whitnall Field; Hamilton, NY	L 0–33		
