= 1924 Brown Bears football team =

American college football season

1924 Brown Bears football
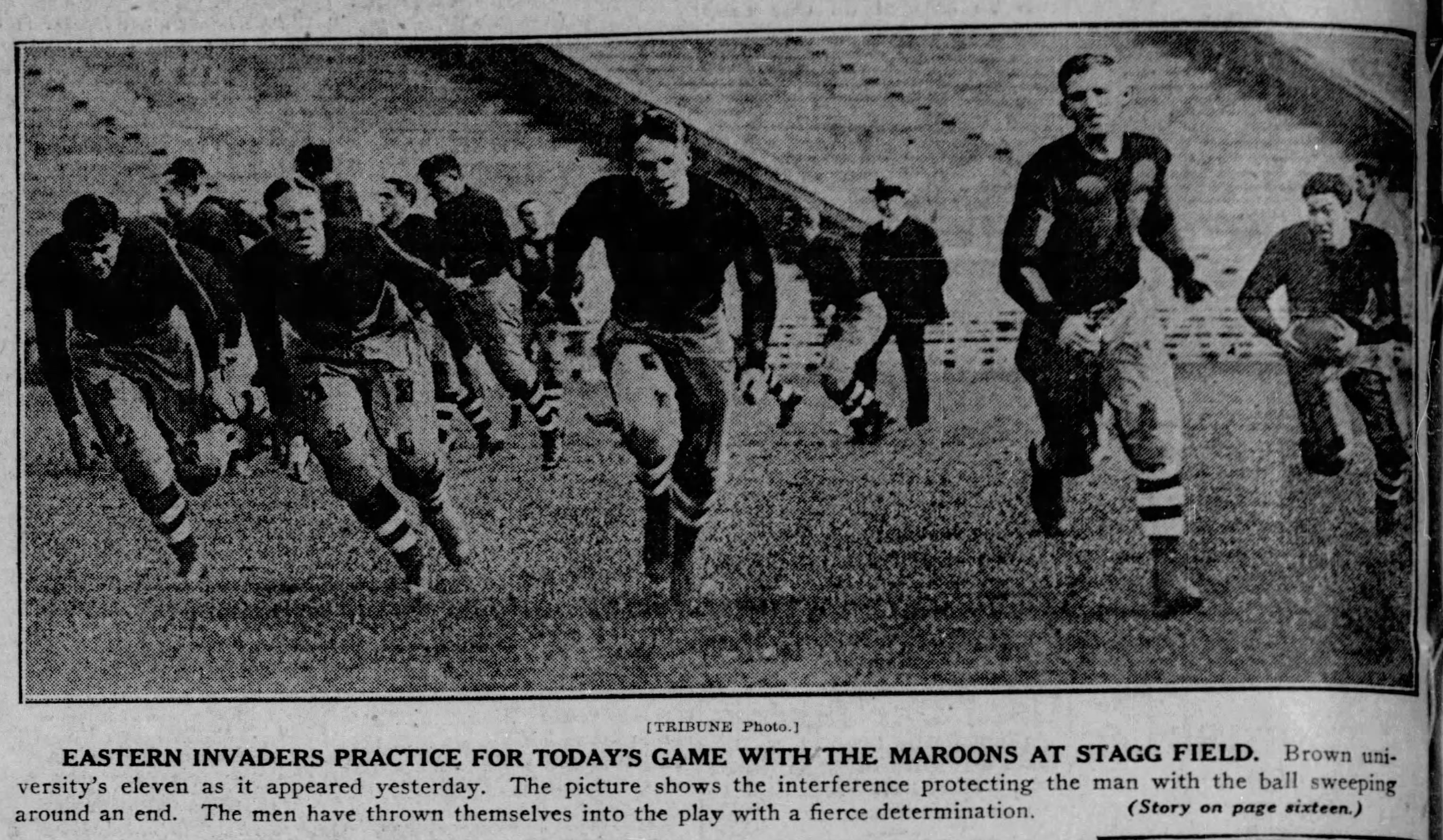
- Conference: Independent
- Record: 5–4
- Head coach: Edward N. Robinson (23rd season)
- Captain: J. H. Sheldon
- Home stadium: Andrews Field

1924 Eastern college football independents records
	Conf.			Overall
Team	W	L	T	W		L		T
No. 9 Dartmouth		–		7	–	0	–	1
No. 3 Yale		–		6	–	0	–	2
No. 8 Penn		–		9	–	1	–	1
Rutgers		–		7	–	1	–	1
Bucknell		–		8	–	2	–	0
Lafayette		–		7	–	2	–	0
Washington & Jefferson		–		7	–	2	–	0
Holy Cross		–		7	–	1	–	1
Army		–		5	–	1	–	2
Syracuse		–		8	–	2	–	1
Fordham		–		6	–	2	–	0
Lehigh		–		4	–	1	–	3
Boston College		–		6	–	3	–	0
Penn State		–		6	–	3	–	1
Princeton		–		4	–	2	–	1
Springfield		–		4	–	2	–	1
Columbia		–		5	–	3	–	1
Pittsburgh		–		5	–	3	–	1
NYU		–		4	–	3	–	1
CCNY		–		4	–	3	–	0
Brown		–		5	–	4	–	0
Carnegie Tech		–		5	–	4	–	0
Colgate		–		5	–	4	–	0
Cornell		–		4	–	4	–	0
Harvard		–		4	–	4	–	0
Tufts		–		3	–	4	–	2
Franklin & Marshall		–		3	–	5	–	1
Villanova		–		2	–	5	–	1
Drexel		–		2	–	7	–	0
Vermont		–		2	–	7	–	0
Temple		–		1	–	4	–	0
Boston University		–		1	–	5	–	0
Buffalo		–		1	–	7	–	0
Rankings from Dickinson System

The 1924 Brown Bears football team represented Brown University during the 1924 college football season. Led by 23rd-year head coach Edward N. Robinson, the Bears compiled a record of 5–4.

== Schedule ==
Date	Time	Opponent	Site	Result	Attendance	Source
October 4		Colby	Andrews Field; Providence, RI	W 45–0		
October 11		at Chicago	Stagg Field; Chicago, IL	L 7–19	26,000	
October 18		Boston University	Andrews Field; Providence, RI	W 35–0		
October 25	2:30 p.m.	at Yale	Yale Bowl; New Haven, CT	L 3–13	45,000	
November 1		at Dartmouth	Memorial Field; Hanover, NH	L 3–10		
November 8		Haskell	Andrews Field; Providence, RI	L 13–17		
November 15	2:00 p.m.	at Harvard	Harvard Stadium; Boston, MA	W 7–0		
November 22		New Hampshire	Andrews Field; Providence, RI	W 21–0		
November 27		Colgate	Andrews Field; Providence, RI	W 20–6		
All times are in Eastern time
