= 1924 Carnegie Tech Tartans football team =

American college football season

1924 Carnegie Tech Tartans football
- Conference: Independent
- Record: 5–4
- Head coach: Walter Steffen (10th season)
- Home stadium: Tech Field

1924 Eastern college football independents records
| | Conf. | | | Overall |
| Team | W | L | T | W | | L | | T |
|---|---|---|---|---|---|---|---|---|
| No. 9 Dartmouth | | – | | 7 | – | 0 | – | 1 |
| No. 3 Yale | | – | | 6 | – | 0 | – | 2 |
| No. 8 Penn | | – | | 9 | – | 1 | – | 1 |
| Rutgers | | – | | 7 | – | 1 | – | 1 |
| Bucknell | | – | | 8 | – | 2 | – | 0 |
| Lafayette | | – | | 7 | – | 2 | – | 0 |
| Washington & Jefferson | | – | | 7 | – | 2 | – | 0 |
| Holy Cross | | – | | 7 | – | 1 | – | 1 |
| Army | | – | | 5 | – | 1 | – | 2 |
| Syracuse | | – | | 8 | – | 2 | – | 1 |
| Fordham | | – | | 6 | – | 2 | – | 0 |
| Lehigh | | – | | 4 | – | 1 | – | 3 |
| Boston College | | – | | 6 | – | 3 | – | 0 |
| Penn State | | – | | 6 | – | 3 | – | 1 |
| Princeton | | – | | 4 | – | 2 | – | 1 |
| Springfield | | – | | 4 | – | 2 | – | 1 |
| Columbia | | – | | 5 | – | 3 | – | 1 |
| Pittsburgh | | – | | 5 | – | 3 | – | 1 |
| NYU | | – | | 4 | – | 3 | – | 1 |
| CCNY | | – | | 4 | – | 3 | – | 0 |
| Brown | | – | | 5 | – | 4 | – | 0 |
| Carnegie Tech | | – | | 5 | – | 4 | – | 0 |
| Colgate | | – | | 5 | – | 4 | – | 0 |
| Cornell | | – | | 4 | – | 4 | – | 0 |
| Harvard | | – | | 4 | – | 4 | – | 0 |
| Tufts | | – | | 3 | – | 4 | – | 2 |
| Franklin & Marshall | | – | | 3 | – | 5 | – | 1 |
| Villanova | | – | | 2 | – | 5 | – | 1 |
| Drexel | | – | | 2 | – | 7 | – | 0 |
| Vermont | | – | | 2 | – | 7 | – | 0 |
| Temple | | – | | 1 | – | 4 | – | 0 |
| Boston University | | – | | 1 | – | 5 | – | 0 |
| Buffalo | | – | | 1 | – | 7 | – | 0 |
Rankings from Dickinson System

The 1924 Carnegie Tech Tartans football team was an American football team that represented the Carnegie Institute of Technology (now known as Carnegie Mellon University) during the 1924 college football season. Led by tenth-year head coach Walter Steffen, Carnegie Tech compiled a record of 5–4.

== Schedule ==
| Date | Time | Opponent | Site | Result | Attendance | Source |
|---|---|---|---|---|---|---|
| September 27 | | Dayton | Pittsburgh, PA | W 14–3 | | |
| October 4 | | at Thiel | Greenville, PA | W 22–0 | | |
| October 11 | | Toledo | Pittsburgh, PA | W 54–0 | | |
| October 18 | | Washington & Jefferson | Pittsburgh, PA | L 0–10 | | |
| October 25 | | Pittsburgh | Forbes Field; Pittsburgh, PA | W 6–0 | 25,000 | |
| November 1 | | Western Maryland | Pittsburgh, PA | W 27–0 | | |
| November 8 | | at Penn State | New Beaver Field; State College, PA | L 7–22 | 7,000 | |
| November 22 | 2:30 p.m. | Quantico Marines | Forbes Field; Pittsburgh, PA | L 0–3 | | |
| November 29 | | Notre Dame | Pittsburgh, PA | L 19–40 | 30,000 | |
