= 1924 Temple Owls football team =

American college football season

1924 Temple Owls football
- Conference: Independent
- Record: 1–4
- Head coach: Albert Barron (1st season)
- Captain: Theodore Doering

1924 Eastern college football independents records
	Conf.			Overall
Team	W	L	T	W		L		T
No. 9 Dartmouth		–		7	–	0	–	1
No. 3 Yale		–		6	–	0	–	2
No. 8 Penn		–		9	–	1	–	1
Rutgers		–		7	–	1	–	1
Bucknell		–		8	–	2	–	0
Lafayette		–		7	–	2	–	0
Washington & Jefferson		–		7	–	2	–	0
Holy Cross		–		7	–	1	–	1
Army		–		5	–	1	–	2
Syracuse		–		8	–	2	–	1
Fordham		–		6	–	2	–	0
Lehigh		–		4	–	1	–	3
Boston College		–		6	–	3	–	0
Penn State		–		6	–	3	–	1
Princeton		–		4	–	2	–	1
Springfield		–		4	–	2	–	1
Columbia		–		5	–	3	–	1
Pittsburgh		–		5	–	3	–	1
NYU		–		4	–	3	–	1
CCNY		–		4	–	3	–	0
Brown		–		5	–	4	–	0
Carnegie Tech		–		5	–	4	–	0
Colgate		–		5	–	4	–	0
Cornell		–		4	–	4	–	0
Harvard		–		4	–	4	–	0
Tufts		–		3	–	4	–	2
Franklin & Marshall		–		3	–	5	–	1
Villanova		–		2	–	5	–	1
Drexel		–		2	–	7	–	0
Vermont		–		2	–	7	–	0
Temple		–		1	–	4	–	0
Boston University		–		1	–	5	–	0
Buffalo		–		1	–	7	–	0
Rankings from Dickinson System

The 1924 Temple Owls football team was an American football team that represented Temple University as an independent during the 1924 college football season. In its first and only season under head coach Albert Barron, the team compiled a 1–4 record.

== Schedule ==
Date	Opponent	Site	Result	Attendance	Source
October 4	at East Stroudsburg		L 6–40		
October 18	at St. Thomas (PA)		L 0–19		
November 1	at Wyoming Seminary		L 0–34		
November 8	at West Chester State Normal		L 3–13		
November 22	Drexel	Philadelphia, PA	W 6–0		
