= 1924 Fordham Maroon football team =

American college football season

1924 Fordham Maroon football
- Conference: Independent
- Record: 6–2
- Head coach: Frank Gargan (5th season)
- Captain: Raymond Snead
- Home stadium: Fordham Field

1924 Eastern college football independents records
	Conf.			Overall
Team	W	L	T	W		L		T
No. 9 Dartmouth		–		7	–	0	–	1
No. 3 Yale		–		6	–	0	–	2
No. 8 Penn		–		9	–	1	–	1
Rutgers		–		7	–	1	–	1
Bucknell		–		8	–	2	–	0
Lafayette		–		7	–	2	–	0
Washington & Jefferson		–		7	–	2	–	0
Holy Cross		–		7	–	1	–	1
Army		–		5	–	1	–	2
Syracuse		–		8	–	2	–	1
Fordham		–		6	–	2	–	0
Lehigh		–		4	–	1	–	3
Boston College		–		6	–	3	–	0
Penn State		–		6	–	3	–	1
Princeton		–		4	–	2	–	1
Springfield		–		4	–	2	–	1
Columbia		–		5	–	3	–	1
Pittsburgh		–		5	–	3	–	1
NYU		–		4	–	3	–	1
CCNY		–		4	–	3	–	0
Brown		–		5	–	4	–	0
Carnegie Tech		–		5	–	4	–	0
Colgate		–		5	–	4	–	0
Cornell		–		4	–	4	–	0
Harvard		–		4	–	4	–	0
Tufts		–		3	–	4	–	2
Franklin & Marshall		–		3	–	5	–	1
Villanova		–		2	–	5	–	1
Drexel		–		2	–	7	–	0
Vermont		–		2	–	7	–	0
Temple		–		1	–	4	–	0
Boston University		–		1	–	5	–	0
Buffalo		–		1	–	7	–	0
Rankings from Dickinson System

The 1924 Fordham Maroon football team was an American football team that represented Fordham University as an independent during the 1924 college football season. In its fifth season under coach Frank Gargan, Fordham compiled a 6–2 record and outscored opponents by a total of 148 to 53. Fordham's media guide claims an additional three victories for a 9–2 record, but no contemporaneous record has been found of those games.

== Schedule ==
Date	Time	Opponent	Site	Result	Attendance	Source
September 27		7th Regiment	Fordham Field; Bronx, NY	W 21–0		
October 4		Manhattan College	Fordham Field; Bronx, NY	W 34–6		
October 13	2:30 p.m.	at Boston College	Braves Field; Chestnut Hill, MA	L 0–28	20,000	
October 18		St. Stephen's	Fordham Field; Bronx, NY	W 26–0		
October 25		at Holy Cross	Fitton Field; Worcester, MA	L 0–13		
November 1		vs. NYU	Yankee Stadium; Bronx, NY	W 27–0	11,000	
November 15		at CCNY	Lewisohn Stadium; New York, NY	W 31–0		
November 22		Catholic University		Cancelled-rain		
November 29		Georgetown	Polo Grounds; New York, NY	W 9–6		
