= 1924 NYU Violets football team =

American college football season

1924 NYU Violets football
- Conference: Independent
- Record: 3–3–1
- Head coach: Tom Thorp (3rd season)
- Home stadium: Ohio Field

1924 Eastern college football independents records
	Conf.			Overall
Team	W	L	T	W		L		T
No. 9 Dartmouth		–		7	–	0	–	1
No. 3 Yale		–		6	–	0	–	2
No. 8 Penn		–		9	–	1	–	1
Rutgers		–		7	–	1	–	1
Bucknell		–		8	–	2	–	0
Lafayette		–		7	–	2	–	0
Washington & Jefferson		–		7	–	2	–	0
Holy Cross		–		7	–	1	–	1
Army		–		5	–	1	–	2
Syracuse		–		8	–	2	–	1
Fordham		–		6	–	2	–	0
Lehigh		–		4	–	1	–	3
Boston College		–		6	–	3	–	0
Penn State		–		6	–	3	–	1
Princeton		–		4	–	2	–	1
Springfield		–		4	–	2	–	1
Columbia		–		5	–	3	–	1
Pittsburgh		–		5	–	3	–	1
NYU		–		4	–	3	–	1
CCNY		–		4	–	3	–	0
Brown		–		5	–	4	–	0
Carnegie Tech		–		5	–	4	–	0
Colgate		–		5	–	4	–	0
Cornell		–		4	–	4	–	0
Harvard		–		4	–	4	–	0
Tufts		–		3	–	4	–	2
Franklin & Marshall		–		3	–	5	–	1
Villanova		–		2	–	5	–	1
Drexel		–		2	–	7	–	0
Vermont		–		2	–	7	–	0
Temple		–		1	–	4	–	0
Boston University		–		1	–	5	–	0
Buffalo		–		1	–	7	–	0
Rankings from Dickinson System

The 1924 NYU Violets football team was an American football team that represented New York University as an independent during the 1924 college football season. In their third year under head coach Tom Thorp, the team compiled a 3–3–1 record.

== Schedule ==
Date	Opponent	Site	Result	Attendance	Source
October 4	St. Stephen's College	Ohio Field; Bronx, NY	W 19–0		
October 11	Union (NY)	Ohio Field; Bronx, NY	T 6–6		
October 18	CCNY	Ohio Field; Bronx, NY	W 7–0	10,000	
October 25	Trinity (CT)	Ohio Field; Bronx, NY	W 12–0		
November 1	vs. Fordham	Yankee Stadium; Bronx, NY	L 0–27	11,000	
November 8	at Columbia	Baker Field; New York, NY	L 0–40		
November 15	Rutgers	Ohio Field; Bronx, NY	L 3–41		
