= 1924 Rutgers Queensmen football team =

American college football season

1924 Rutgers Queensmen football
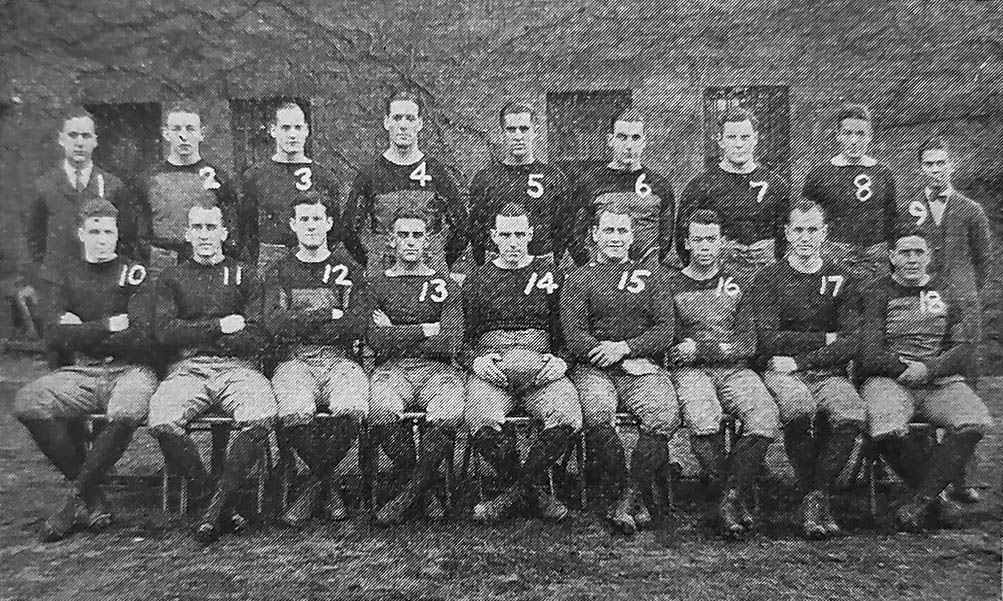
- Conference: Independent
- Record: 7–1–1
- Head coach: John Wallace (1st season)
- Captain: E. Gaynor Brennan
- Home stadium: Neilson Field

1924 Eastern college football independents records
	Conf.			Overall
Team	W	L	T	W		L		T
No. 9 Dartmouth		–		7	–	0	–	1
No. 3 Yale		–		6	–	0	–	2
No. 8 Penn		–		9	–	1	–	1
Rutgers		–		7	–	1	–	1
Bucknell		–		8	–	2	–	0
Lafayette		–		7	–	2	–	0
Washington & Jefferson		–		7	–	2	–	0
Holy Cross		–		7	–	1	–	1
Army		–		5	–	1	–	2
Syracuse		–		8	–	2	–	1
Fordham		–		6	–	2	–	0
Lehigh		–		4	–	1	–	3
Boston College		–		6	–	3	–	0
Penn State		–		6	–	3	–	1
Princeton		–		4	–	2	–	1
Springfield		–		4	–	2	–	1
Columbia		–		5	–	3	–	1
Pittsburgh		–		5	–	3	–	1
NYU		–		4	–	3	–	1
CCNY		–		4	–	3	–	0
Brown		–		5	–	4	–	0
Carnegie Tech		–		5	–	4	–	0
Colgate		–		5	–	4	–	0
Cornell		–		4	–	4	–	0
Harvard		–		4	–	4	–	0
Tufts		–		3	–	4	–	2
Franklin & Marshall		–		3	–	5	–	1
Villanova		–		2	–	5	–	1
Drexel		–		2	–	7	–	0
Vermont		–		2	–	7	–	0
Temple		–		1	–	4	–	0
Boston University		–		1	–	5	–	0
Buffalo		–		1	–	7	–	0
Rankings from Dickinson System

The 1924 Rutgers Queensmen football team represented Rutgers University as an independent during the 1924 college football season. In their first season under head coach John Wallace, the Queensmen compiled a 7–1–1 record and outscored their opponents, 249 to 98. The team was undefeated through eight games but lost, 12–7, to Bucknell] in the final game of the season.

== Schedule ==
Date	Opponent	Site	Result	Source
September 27	Villanova	Neilson Field; New Brunswick, NJ	W 14–0	
October 4	Lebanon Valley	Neilson Field; New Brunswick, NJ	W 56–0	
October 11	St. Bonaventure	Neilson Field; New Brunswick, NJ	W 36–7	
October 18	at Cornell	Schoellkopf Field; Ithaca, NY	W 10–0	
October 25	at Lehigh	Taylor Stadium; Bethlehem, PA	T 13–13	
November 1	Franklin & Marshall	Neilson Field; New Brunswick, NJ	W 30–6	
November 8	vs. Lafayette	Palmer Stadium; Princeton, NJ	W 43–7	
November 15	at NYU	Ohio Field; Bronx, NY	W 41–3	
November 22	Bucknell	Neilson Field; New Brunswick, NJ	L 7–12	
