= 1924 Cornell Big Red football team =

American college football season

1924 Cornell Big Red football
- Conference: Independent
- Record: 4–4
- Head coach: Gil Dobie (5th season)
- Offensive scheme: Single-wing
- Base defense: 6–3–2
- Captain: Frank Henderson
- Home stadium: Schoellkopf Field

1924 Eastern college football independents records
	Conf.			Overall
Team	W	L	T	W		L		T
No. 9 Dartmouth		–		7	–	0	–	1
No. 3 Yale		–		6	–	0	–	2
No. 8 Penn		–		9	–	1	–	1
Rutgers		–		7	–	1	–	1
Bucknell		–		8	–	2	–	0
Lafayette		–		7	–	2	–	0
Washington & Jefferson		–		7	–	2	–	0
Holy Cross		–		7	–	1	–	1
Army		–		5	–	1	–	2
Syracuse		–		8	–	2	–	1
Fordham		–		6	–	2	–	0
Lehigh		–		4	–	1	–	3
Boston College		–		6	–	3	–	0
Penn State		–		6	–	3	–	1
Princeton		–		4	–	2	–	1
Springfield		–		4	–	2	–	1
Columbia		–		5	–	3	–	1
Pittsburgh		–		5	–	3	–	1
NYU		–		4	–	3	–	1
CCNY		–		4	–	3	–	0
Brown		–		5	–	4	–	0
Carnegie Tech		–		5	–	4	–	0
Colgate		–		5	–	4	–	0
Cornell		–		4	–	4	–	0
Harvard		–		4	–	4	–	0
Tufts		–		3	–	4	–	2
Franklin & Marshall		–		3	–	5	–	1
Villanova		–		2	–	5	–	1
Drexel		–		2	–	7	–	0
Vermont		–		2	–	7	–	0
Temple		–		1	–	4	–	0
Boston University		–		1	–	5	–	0
Buffalo		–		1	–	7	–	0
Rankings from Dickinson System

The 1924 Cornell Big Red football team was an American football team that represented Cornell University during the 1924 college football season. In their fifth season under head coach Gil Dobie, the Big Red compiled a 4–4 record and outscored all opponents by a combined total of 209 to 71.

== Schedule ==
Date	Opponent	Site	Result	Source
September 27	St. Bonaventure	Schoellkopf Field; Ithaca, NY	W 56–0	
October 4	Niagara	Schoellkopf Field; Ithaca, NY	W 27–0	
October 11	Williams	Schoellkopf Field; Ithaca, NY	L 7–14	
October 18	Rutgers	Schoellkopf Field; Ithaca, NY	L 0–10	
November 1	Columbia	Schoellkopf Field; Ithaca, NY (rivalry)	W 14–0	
November 8	Susquehanna	Schoellkopf Field; Ithaca, NY	W 91–0	
November 15	vs. Dartmouth	Polo Grounds; New York, NY (rivalry)	L 14–27	
November 27	at Penn	Franklin Field; Philadelphia, PA (rivalry)	L 0–20	
