= 1924 Dartmouth Indians football team =

American college football season

1924 Dartmouth Indians football
- Conference: Independent
- Record: 7–0–1
- Head coach: Jesse Hawley (2nd season)
- Captain: Henry Bjorkman
- Home stadium: Memorial Field

1924 Eastern college football independents records
	Conf.			Overall
Team	W	L	T	W		L		T
No. 9 Dartmouth		–		7	–	0	–	1
No. 3 Yale		–		6	–	0	–	2
No. 8 Penn		–		9	–	1	–	1
Rutgers		–		7	–	1	–	1
Bucknell		–		8	–	2	–	0
Lafayette		–		7	–	2	–	0
Washington & Jefferson		–		7	–	2	–	0
Holy Cross		–		7	–	1	–	1
Army		–		5	–	1	–	2
Syracuse		–		8	–	2	–	1
Fordham		–		6	–	2	–	0
Lehigh		–		4	–	1	–	3
Boston College		–		6	–	3	–	0
Penn State		–		6	–	3	–	1
Princeton		–		4	–	2	–	1
Springfield		–		4	–	2	–	1
Columbia		–		5	–	3	–	1
Pittsburgh		–		5	–	3	–	1
NYU		–		4	–	3	–	1
CCNY		–		4	–	3	–	0
Brown		–		5	–	4	–	0
Carnegie Tech		–		5	–	4	–	0
Colgate		–		5	–	4	–	0
Cornell		–		4	–	4	–	0
Harvard		–		4	–	4	–	0
Tufts		–		3	–	4	–	2
Franklin & Marshall		–		3	–	5	–	1
Villanova		–		2	–	5	–	1
Drexel		–		2	–	7	–	0
Vermont		–		2	–	7	–	0
Temple		–		1	–	4	–	0
Boston University		–		1	–	5	–	0
Buffalo		–		1	–	7	–	0
Rankings from Dickinson System

The 1924 Dartmouth Indians football team was an American football team that represented Dartmouth College as an independent during the 1924 college football season. In their second season under head coach Jesse Hawley, the Indians compiled a 7–0–1 record, shut out five of eight opponents, and outscored opponents by a total of 225 to 31.

Dartmouth's 1924 season was part of a 22-game unbeaten streak that began in November 1923 and continued until October 1926.

Henry Bjorkman was the team captain. Andy Oberlander was the team's leading scorer with 60 points scored on 10 touchdowns. R. B. Hall added 42 points on 7 touchdowns.

== Schedule ==
Date	Opponent	Site	Result	Attendance	Source
September 27	Norwich	Memorial Field; Hanover, NH	W 40–0		
October 4	McGill	Memorial Field; Hanover, NH	W 52–0		
October 11	Vermont	Memorial Field; Hanover, NH	W 38–0		
October 18	at Yale	Yale Bowl; New Haven, CT	T 14–14	42,000	
October 25	at Harvard	Harvard Stadium; Boston, MA	W 6–0	51,000	
November 1	Brown	Memorial Field; Hanover, NH	W 10–3		
November 8	Boston University	Memorial Field; Hanover, NH	W 38–0		
November 15	vs. Cornell	Polo Grounds; New York, NY	W 27–14		
