= 1924 Penn State Nittany Lions football team =

American college football season

1924 Penn State Nittany Lions football
- Conference: Independent
- Record: 6–3–1
- Head coach: Hugo Bezdek (7th season)
- Captain: Bas Gray
- Home stadium: New Beaver Field

1924 Eastern college football independents records
| | Conf. | | | Overall |
| Team | W | L | T | W | | L | | T |
|---|---|---|---|---|---|---|---|---|
| No. 9 Dartmouth | | – | | 7 | – | 0 | – | 1 |
| No. 3 Yale | | – | | 6 | – | 0 | – | 2 |
| No. 8 Penn | | – | | 9 | – | 1 | – | 1 |
| Rutgers | | – | | 7 | – | 1 | – | 1 |
| Bucknell | | – | | 8 | – | 2 | – | 0 |
| Lafayette | | – | | 7 | – | 2 | – | 0 |
| Washington & Jefferson | | – | | 7 | – | 2 | – | 0 |
| Holy Cross | | – | | 7 | – | 1 | – | 1 |
| Army | | – | | 5 | – | 1 | – | 2 |
| Syracuse | | – | | 8 | – | 2 | – | 1 |
| Fordham | | – | | 6 | – | 2 | – | 0 |
| Lehigh | | – | | 4 | – | 1 | – | 3 |
| Boston College | | – | | 6 | – | 3 | – | 0 |
| Penn State | | – | | 6 | – | 3 | – | 1 |
| Princeton | | – | | 4 | – | 2 | – | 1 |
| Springfield | | – | | 4 | – | 2 | – | 1 |
| Columbia | | – | | 5 | – | 3 | – | 1 |
| Pittsburgh | | – | | 5 | – | 3 | – | 1 |
| NYU | | – | | 4 | – | 3 | – | 1 |
| CCNY | | – | | 4 | – | 3 | – | 0 |
| Brown | | – | | 5 | – | 4 | – | 0 |
| Carnegie Tech | | – | | 5 | – | 4 | – | 0 |
| Colgate | | – | | 5 | – | 4 | – | 0 |
| Cornell | | – | | 4 | – | 4 | – | 0 |
| Harvard | | – | | 4 | – | 4 | – | 0 |
| Tufts | | – | | 3 | – | 4 | – | 2 |
| Franklin & Marshall | | – | | 3 | – | 5 | – | 1 |
| Villanova | | – | | 2 | – | 5 | – | 1 |
| Drexel | | – | | 2 | – | 7 | – | 0 |
| Vermont | | – | | 2 | – | 7 | – | 0 |
| Temple | | – | | 1 | – | 4 | – | 0 |
| Boston University | | – | | 1 | – | 5 | – | 0 |
| Buffalo | | – | | 1 | – | 7 | – | 0 |
Rankings from Dickinson System

The 1924 Penn State Nittany Lions football team represented the Pennsylvania State College as an independent during the 1924 college football season. The team was coached by Hugo Bezdek and played its home games in New Beaver Field in State College, Pennsylvania.

== Schedule ==
| Date | Opponent | Site | Result | Attendance | Source |
|---|---|---|---|---|---|
| September 27 | Lebanon Valley | New Beaver Field; State College, PA | W 47–3 | 3,500 | |
| October 4 | NC State | New Beaver Field; State College, PA | W 51–6 | 3,500 | |
| October 11 | Gettysburg | New Beaver Field; State College, PA | W 26–0 | 6,000 | |
| October 18 | at Georgia Tech | Grant Field; Atlanta, GA | L 13–15 | 22,000 | |
| October 25 | Syracuse^{†} | New Beaver Field; State College, PA (rivalry) | L 6–10 | | |
| November 1 | at Navy | Thompson Stadium; Annapolis, MD | W 6–0 | | |
| November 8 | Carnegie Tech | New Beaver Field; State College, PA | W 22–7 | 7,000 | |
| November 15 | at Penn | Franklin Field; Philadelphia, PA | T 0–0 | 52,000 | |
| November 22 | Marietta | New Beaver Field; State College, PA | W 28–0 | 3,500 | |
| November 27 | at Pittsburgh | Forbes Field; Pittsburgh, PA (rivalry) | L 3–24 | 33,000 | |
^{†}Homecoming
