= 1924 Colgate football team =

American college football season

1924 Colgate football
- Conference: Independent
- Record: 5–4
- Head coach: Dick Harlow (3rd season)
- Captain: Saville Crowther
- Home stadium: Whitnall Field

1924 Eastern college football independents records
	Conf.			Overall
Team	W	L	T	W		L		T
No. 9 Dartmouth		–		7	–	0	–	1
No. 3 Yale		–		6	–	0	–	2
No. 8 Penn		–		9	–	1	–	1
Rutgers		–		7	–	1	–	1
Bucknell		–		8	–	2	–	0
Lafayette		–		7	–	2	–	0
Washington & Jefferson		–		7	–	2	–	0
Holy Cross		–		7	–	1	–	1
Army		–		5	–	1	–	2
Syracuse		–		8	–	2	–	1
Fordham		–		6	–	2	–	0
Lehigh		–		4	–	1	–	3
Boston College		–		6	–	3	–	0
Penn State		–		6	–	3	–	1
Princeton		–		4	–	2	–	1
Springfield		–		4	–	2	–	1
Columbia		–		5	–	3	–	1
Pittsburgh		–		5	–	3	–	1
NYU		–		4	–	3	–	1
CCNY		–		4	–	3	–	0
Brown		–		5	–	4	–	0
Carnegie Tech		–		5	–	4	–	0
Colgate		–		5	–	4	–	0
Cornell		–		4	–	4	–	0
Harvard		–		4	–	4	–	0
Tufts		–		3	–	4	–	2
Franklin & Marshall		–		3	–	5	–	1
Villanova		–		2	–	5	–	1
Drexel		–		2	–	7	–	0
Vermont		–		2	–	7	–	0
Temple		–		1	–	4	–	0
Boston University		–		1	–	5	–	0
Buffalo		–		1	–	7	–	0
Rankings from Dickinson System

The 1924 Colgate football team was an American football team that represented Colgate University as an independent during the 1924 college football season. In its third season under head coach Dick Harlow, the team compiled a 5–4 record and outscored opponents by a total of 218 to 94. Saville Crowther was the team captain. The team played its home games on Whitnall Field in Hamilton, New York.

== Schedule ==
Date	Opponent	Site	Result	Attendance	Source
October 4	Alfred	Whitnall Field; Hamilton, NY	W 35–0		
October 11	Clarkson	Whitnall Field; Hamilton, NY	W 41–0		
October 18	at Nebraska	Memorial Stadium; Lincoln, NE	L 7–33		
October 25	Hobart	Whitnall Field; Hamilton, NY	W 49–0		
November 1	Providence College	Whitnall Field; Hamilton, NY	W 42–0		
November 8	at West Virginia	Mountaineer Field; Morgantown, WV	L 2–34		
November 15	Springfield	Whitnall Field; Hamilton, NY	W 33–0		
November 22	at Syracuse	Archbold Stadium; Syracuse, NY (rivalry)	L 3–7	30,000	
November 27	at Brown	Andrews Field; Providence, RI	L 6–20		
