= John L. Rothacher =

American football player and coach (1886–1962)

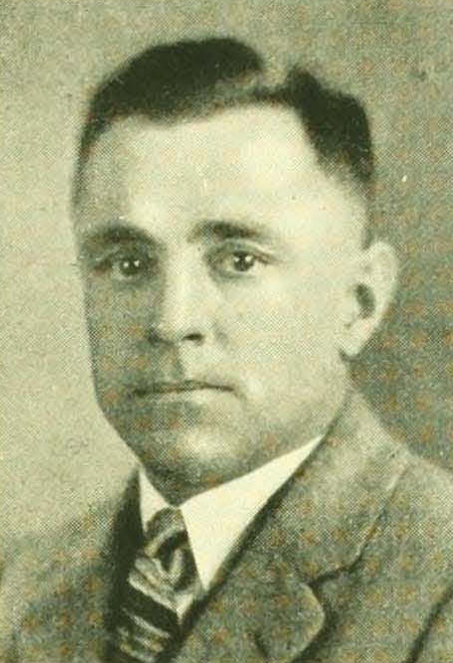
- Rothacher pictured in The Massasoit 1925, Springfield College yearbook

Biographical details
- Born: November 1, 1886; Alton, Illinois, U.S.
- Died: August 27, 1962 (aged 75); Alton, Illinois, U.S.

Playing career
- 1911–1913: Springfield
- Position: Guard

Coaching career (HC unless noted)
- 1924–1936: Springfield

Administrative career (AD unless noted)
- 1924–1937: Springfield

Head coaching record
- Overall: 66–29–12

John Louis Rothacher (November 1, 1886 – August 26, 1962) was an American college football player and coach. He served as the head football coach at Springfield College in Springfield, Massachusetts from 1924 to 1936, compiling a record of 66–29–12. Rothacher played football at Springfield from 1911 to 1913 as a guard before graduating in 1914.

Rothacher died on August 26, 1962, in Alton, Illinois.

== Head coaching record ==
Year	Team	Overall	Conference	Standing	Bowl/playoffs
Springfield Red and White / Gymnasts (Independent) (1924–1936)
1924	Springfield	4–2–1			
1925	Springfield	6–1–1			
1926	Springfield	6–2			
1927	Springfield	7–0–2			
1928	Springfield	5–4			
1929	Springfield	5–2–2			
1930	Springfield	8–1			
1931	Springfield	5–2			
1932	Springfield	5–2–1			
1933	Springfield	3–4–1			
1934	Springfield	2–3–3			
1935	Springfield	6–3			
1936	Springfield	4–3–1			
Springfield:		66–29–12			
Total:		66–29–12			
