= 1924 Boston University Terriers football team =

American college football season

1924 Boston University Terriers football
- Conference: Independent
- Record: 1–5
- Head coach: Charles Whelan (4th season)

1924 Eastern college football independents records
	Conf.			Overall
Team	W	L	T	W		L		T
No. 9 Dartmouth		–		7	–	0	–	1
No. 3 Yale		–		6	–	0	–	2
No. 8 Penn		–		9	–	1	–	1
Rutgers		–		7	–	1	–	1
Bucknell		–		8	–	2	–	0
Lafayette		–		7	–	2	–	0
Washington & Jefferson		–		7	–	2	–	0
Holy Cross		–		7	–	1	–	1
Army		–		5	–	1	–	2
Syracuse		–		8	–	2	–	1
Fordham		–		6	–	2	–	0
Lehigh		–		4	–	1	–	3
Boston College		–		6	–	3	–	0
Penn State		–		6	–	3	–	1
Princeton		–		4	–	2	–	1
Springfield		–		4	–	2	–	1
Columbia		–		5	–	3	–	1
Pittsburgh		–		5	–	3	–	1
NYU		–		4	–	3	–	1
CCNY		–		4	–	3	–	0
Brown		–		5	–	4	–	0
Carnegie Tech		–		5	–	4	–	0
Colgate		–		5	–	4	–	0
Cornell		–		4	–	4	–	0
Harvard		–		4	–	4	–	0
Tufts		–		3	–	4	–	2
Franklin & Marshall		–		3	–	5	–	1
Villanova		–		2	–	5	–	1
Drexel		–		2	–	7	–	0
Vermont		–		2	–	7	–	0
Temple		–		1	–	4	–	0
Boston University		–		1	–	5	–	0
Buffalo		–		1	–	7	–	0
Rankings from Dickinson System

The 1924 Boston University Terriers football team was an American football team that represented Boston University as an independent during the 1924 college football season. In its fourth season under head coach Charles Whelan, the team compiled a 1–5 record, was shut out in four of six games, and was outscored by a total of 122 to 13.

== Schedule ==
Date	Opponent	Site	Result	Attendance	Source
October 4	at Maine	Alumni Field; Orono, ME	W 6–0		
October 11	at Holy Cross	Fitton Field; Worcester, MA	L 7–16	6,000	
October 18	at Brown	Andrews Field; Providence, RI	L 0–35		
October 25	at Army	Michie Stadium; West Point, NY	L 0–20		
November 1	at Harvard	Harvard Stadium; Boston, MA	L 0–13		
November 8	at Dartmouth	Memorial Field; Hanover, NH	L 0–38		
