= 1924 Army Cadets football team =

American college football season

1924 Army Cadets football
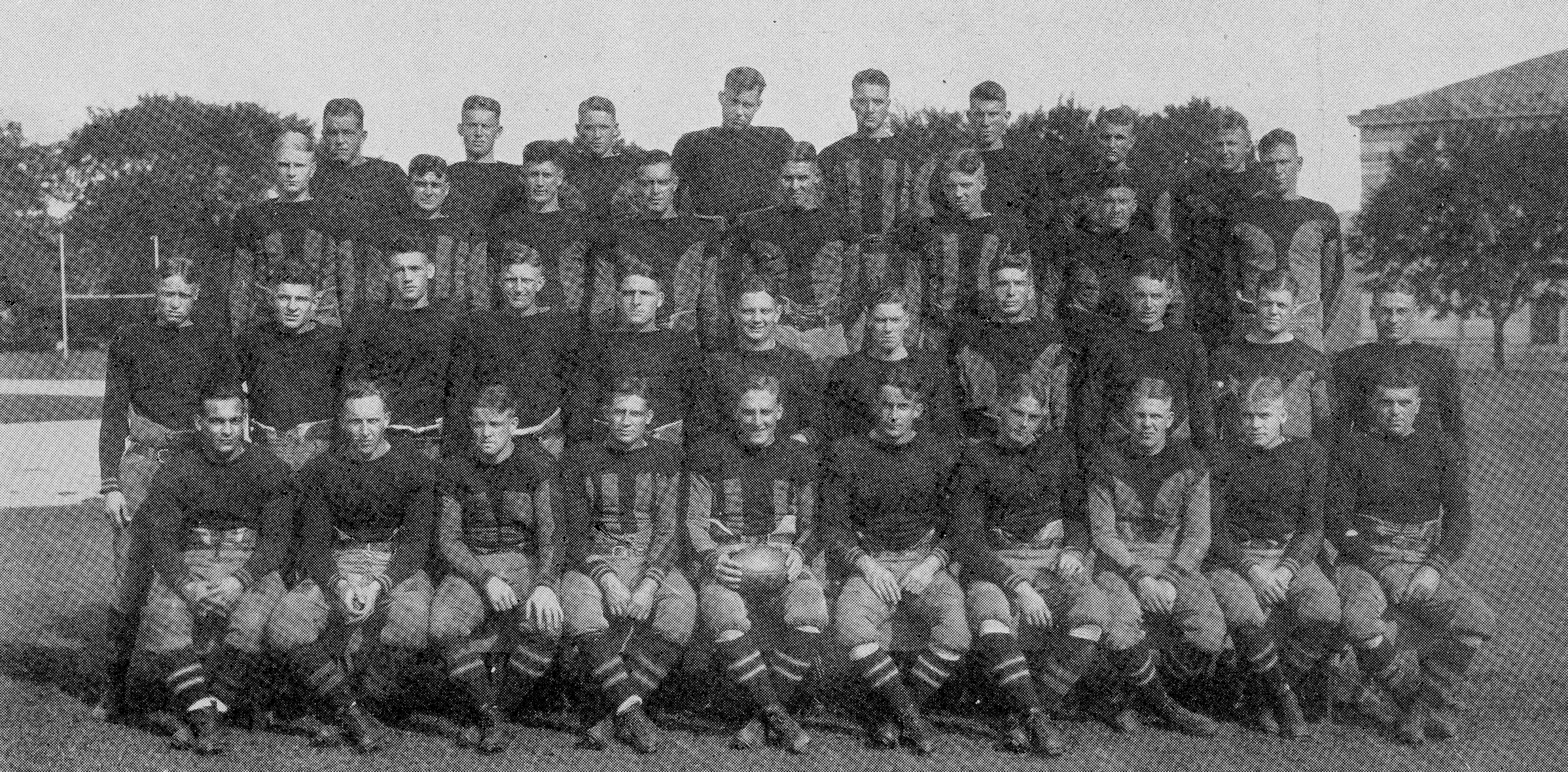
- Conference: Independent
- Record: 5–1–2
- Head coach: John McEwan (2nd season)
- Captain: Edgar Garbisch
- Home stadium: Michie Stadium

Uniform
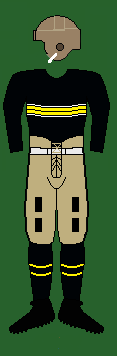

1924 Eastern college football independents records
	Conf.			Overall
Team	W	L	T	W		L		T
No. 9 Dartmouth		–		7	–	0	–	1
No. 3 Yale		–		6	–	0	–	2
No. 8 Penn		–		9	–	1	–	1
Rutgers		–		7	–	1	–	1
Bucknell		–		8	–	2	–	0
Lafayette		–		7	–	2	–	0
Washington & Jefferson		–		7	–	2	–	0
Holy Cross		–		7	–	1	–	1
Army		–		5	–	1	–	2
Syracuse		–		8	–	2	–	1
Fordham		–		6	–	2	–	0
Lehigh		–		4	–	1	–	3
Boston College		–		6	–	3	–	0
Penn State		–		6	–	3	–	1
Princeton		–		4	–	2	–	1
Springfield		–		4	–	2	–	1
Columbia		–		5	–	3	–	1
Pittsburgh		–		5	–	3	–	1
NYU		–		4	–	3	–	1
CCNY		–		4	–	3	–	0
Brown		–		5	–	4	–	0
Carnegie Tech		–		5	–	4	–	0
Colgate		–		5	–	4	–	0
Cornell		–		4	–	4	–	0
Harvard		–		4	–	4	–	0
Tufts		–		3	–	4	–	2
Franklin & Marshall		–		3	–	5	–	1
Villanova		–		2	–	5	–	1
Drexel		–		2	–	7	–	0
Vermont		–		2	–	7	–	0
Temple		–		1	–	4	–	0
Boston University		–		1	–	5	–	0
Buffalo		–		1	–	7	–	0
Rankings from Dickinson System

The 1924 Army Cadets football team represented the United States Military Academy as an independent during the 1924 college football season. In their second season under head coach John McEwan, the Cadets compiled a 5–1–2 record, shut out four of their eight opponents, and outscored all opponents by a combined total of 111 to 41. In the annual Army–Navy Game, the Cadets defeated the Midshipmen 12–0; the team's only loss came to undefeated national champion Notre Dame, by a 13 to 7 score.

Five Army players were recognized on the All-America team. Center Edgar Garbisch was selected as a first-team player by Walter Camp, Football World magazine, and All-Sports Magazine. Garbisch was later inducted into the College Football Hall of Fame. Guard August Farwick received first-team honors from the All-America Board, the Newspaper Enterprise Association, Billy Evans, and Walter Eckersall. End Frank Frazer was selected as a third-team player by Walter Camp. Harry Ellinger received third-team honors from Davis J. Walsh. Halfback Harry Wilson was selected as a third-team player by All-Sports Magazine.

== Schedule ==
Date	Opponent	Site	Result	Attendance	Source
October 4	Saint Louis	Michie Stadium; West Point, NY	W 17–0		
October 11	Detroit	Michie Stadium; West Point, NY	W 20–0		
October 18	vs. Notre Dame	Polo Grounds; New York, NY (rivalry)	L 7–13	50,000	
October 25	Boston University	Michie Stadium; West Point, NY	W 20–0		
November 1	at Yale	Yale Bowl; New Haven, CT	T 7–7	80,000	
November 8	Florida	Michie Stadium; West Point, NY	W 14–7		
November 15	Columbia	Michie Stadium; West Point, NY	T 14–14		
November 29	vs. Navy	Municipal Stadium; Baltimore, MD (Army–Navy Game)	W 12–0		

== Players ==
- Henry Baxter
- Charles F. Born
- Brennan
- Samuel Brentnall
- Buell
- Maurice F. Daly
- Harry Ellinger
- August W. Farwick
- Frank G. Fraser
- Edgar Garbisch
- Joseph H. Gilbreth
- William N. Gillmore
- Welborn Griffith
- Louis A. Hammack
- Hammer
- Orville Hewitt
- Edwin L. Johnson
- Minnehan
- LaVerne G. Saunders
- Frederick F. Scheiffler
- Schmidt
- Sievers
- Simonton
- Taylor
- Thomas J. H. Trapnell
- Henry R. Westphalinger
- Harry Wilson (College Football Hall of Fame)
- William H. Wood
- Prentice Yeomans
