= 1924 Villanova Wildcats football team =

American college football season

1924 Villanova Wildcats football
- Conference: Independent
- Record: 2–5–1
- Head coach: Dutch Sommer (3rd season)
- Captain: John Savers

1924 Eastern college football independents records
| | Conf. | | | Overall |
| Team | W | L | T | W | | L | | T |
|---|---|---|---|---|---|---|---|---|
| No. 9 Dartmouth | | – | | 7 | – | 0 | – | 1 |
| No. 3 Yale | | – | | 6 | – | 0 | – | 2 |
| No. 8 Penn | | – | | 9 | – | 1 | – | 1 |
| Rutgers | | – | | 7 | – | 1 | – | 1 |
| Bucknell | | – | | 8 | – | 2 | – | 0 |
| Lafayette | | – | | 7 | – | 2 | – | 0 |
| Washington & Jefferson | | – | | 7 | – | 2 | – | 0 |
| Holy Cross | | – | | 7 | – | 1 | – | 1 |
| Army | | – | | 5 | – | 1 | – | 2 |
| Syracuse | | – | | 8 | – | 2 | – | 1 |
| Fordham | | – | | 6 | – | 2 | – | 0 |
| Lehigh | | – | | 4 | – | 1 | – | 3 |
| Boston College | | – | | 6 | – | 3 | – | 0 |
| Penn State | | – | | 6 | – | 3 | – | 1 |
| Princeton | | – | | 4 | – | 2 | – | 1 |
| Springfield | | – | | 4 | – | 2 | – | 1 |
| Columbia | | – | | 5 | – | 3 | – | 1 |
| Pittsburgh | | – | | 5 | – | 3 | – | 1 |
| NYU | | – | | 4 | – | 3 | – | 1 |
| CCNY | | – | | 4 | – | 3 | – | 0 |
| Brown | | – | | 5 | – | 4 | – | 0 |
| Carnegie Tech | | – | | 5 | – | 4 | – | 0 |
| Colgate | | – | | 5 | – | 4 | – | 0 |
| Cornell | | – | | 4 | – | 4 | – | 0 |
| Harvard | | – | | 4 | – | 4 | – | 0 |
| Tufts | | – | | 3 | – | 4 | – | 2 |
| Franklin & Marshall | | – | | 3 | – | 5 | – | 1 |
| Villanova | | – | | 2 | – | 5 | – | 1 |
| Drexel | | – | | 2 | – | 7 | – | 0 |
| Vermont | | – | | 2 | – | 7 | – | 0 |
| Temple | | – | | 1 | – | 4 | – | 0 |
| Boston University | | – | | 1 | – | 5 | – | 0 |
| Buffalo | | – | | 1 | – | 7 | – | 0 |
Rankings from Dickinson System

The 1924 Villanova Wildcats football team represented the Villanova University during the 1924 college football season. The Wildcats team captain was John Savers.

== Schedule ==
| Date | Opponent | Site | Result |
|---|---|---|---|
| September 27 | at Rutgers | Neilson Field; New Brunswick, NJ | L 0–14 |
| October 4 | at Dickinson | Carlisle, PA | L 0–14 |
| October 11 | Lebanon Valley | Villanova, PA | T 7–7 |
| October 18 | Delaware | Villanova, PA (rivalry) | W 17–3 |
| October 25 | at St. John's | New York, NY | L 0–13 |
| November 4 | at Saint Joseph's | Philadelphia, PA | W 39–3 |
| November 15 | at Lehigh | Taylor Stadium; Bethlehem, PA | L 7–14 |
| November 27 | at Muhlenberg | Allentown, PA | L 0–41 |
