= 1924 CCNY Lavender football team =

American college football season

1924 CCNY Lavender football
- Conference: Independent
- Record: 4–3
- Head coach: Harold J. Parker (1st season)
- Home stadium: Lewisohn Stadium

1924 Eastern college football independents records
	Conf.			Overall
Team	W	L	T	W		L		T
No. 9 Dartmouth		–		7	–	0	–	1
No. 3 Yale		–		6	–	0	–	2
No. 8 Penn		–		9	–	1	–	1
Rutgers		–		7	–	1	–	1
Bucknell		–		8	–	2	–	0
Lafayette		–		7	–	2	–	0
Washington & Jefferson		–		7	–	2	–	0
Holy Cross		–		7	–	1	–	1
Army		–		5	–	1	–	2
Syracuse		–		8	–	2	–	1
Fordham		–		6	–	2	–	0
Lehigh		–		4	–	1	–	3
Boston College		–		6	–	3	–	0
Penn State		–		6	–	3	–	1
Princeton		–		4	–	2	–	1
Springfield		–		4	–	2	–	1
Columbia		–		5	–	3	–	1
Pittsburgh		–		5	–	3	–	1
NYU		–		4	–	3	–	1
CCNY		–		4	–	3	–	0
Brown		–		5	–	4	–	0
Carnegie Tech		–		5	–	4	–	0
Colgate		–		5	–	4	–	0
Cornell		–		4	–	4	–	0
Harvard		–		4	–	4	–	0
Tufts		–		3	–	4	–	2
Franklin & Marshall		–		3	–	5	–	1
Villanova		–		2	–	5	–	1
Drexel		–		2	–	7	–	0
Vermont		–		2	–	7	–	0
Temple		–		1	–	4	–	0
Boston University		–		1	–	5	–	0
Buffalo		–		1	–	7	–	0
Rankings from Dickinson System

The 1924 CCNY Lavender football team was an American football team that represented the City College of New York (CCNY) as an independent during the 1924 college football season. In their first season under Harold J. Parker, the Lavender team compiled a 4–3 record.

== Schedule ==
Date	Opponent	Site	Result	Source
October 4	at Stevens	Castle Point; Hoboken, NJ	W 15–0	
October 11	St. Stephen's	Lewisohn Stadium; New York, NY	W 26–7	
October 18	at NYU	Ohio Field; Bronx, NY	L 0–7	
October 25	Rhode Island State	Lewisohn Stadium; New York, NY	W 13–0	
November 1	at Hamilton	Clinton, NY	L 0–33	
November 8	Ursinus	Lewisohn Stadium; New York, NY	W 19–6	
November 15	Fordham	Lewisohn Stadium; New York, NY	L 0–31	
