= 1924 Bucknell Bison football team =

American college football season

1924 Bucknell Bison football
- Conference: Independent
- Record: 8–2
- Head coach: Charley Moran (1st season)
- Home stadium: Bucknell Memorial Stadium

1924 Eastern college football independents records
	Conf.			Overall
Team	W	L	T	W		L		T
No. 9 Dartmouth		–		7	–	0	–	1
No. 3 Yale		–		6	–	0	–	2
No. 8 Penn		–		9	–	1	–	1
Rutgers		–		7	–	1	–	1
Bucknell		–		8	–	2	–	0
Lafayette		–		7	–	2	–	0
Washington & Jefferson		–		7	–	2	–	0
Holy Cross		–		7	–	1	–	1
Army		–		5	–	1	–	2
Syracuse		–		8	–	2	–	1
Fordham		–		6	–	2	–	0
Lehigh		–		4	–	1	–	3
Boston College		–		6	–	3	–	0
Penn State		–		6	–	3	–	1
Princeton		–		4	–	2	–	1
Springfield		–		4	–	2	–	1
Columbia		–		5	–	3	–	1
Pittsburgh		–		5	–	3	–	1
NYU		–		4	–	3	–	1
CCNY		–		4	–	3	–	0
Brown		–		5	–	4	–	0
Carnegie Tech		–		5	–	4	–	0
Colgate		–		5	–	4	–	0
Cornell		–		4	–	4	–	0
Harvard		–		4	–	4	–	0
Tufts		–		3	–	4	–	2
Franklin & Marshall		–		3	–	5	–	1
Villanova		–		2	–	5	–	1
Drexel		–		2	–	7	–	0
Vermont		–		2	–	7	–	0
Temple		–		1	–	4	–	0
Boston University		–		1	–	5	–	0
Buffalo		–		1	–	7	–	0
Rankings from Dickinson System

The 1924 Bucknell Bison football team was an American football team that represented Bucknell University as an independent during the 1924 college football season. In its first season under head coach Charley Moran, the team compiled an 8–2 record.

The team played its home games at the newly-constructed Bucknell Memorial Stadium in Lewisburg, Pennsylvania.

== Schedule ==
Date	Opponent	Site	Result	Attendance	Source
September 27	Western Maryland	Bucknell Memorial Stadium; Lewisburg, PA	W 6–0		
October 4	Gallaudet	Bucknell Memorial Stadium; Lewisburg, PA	W 39–6		
October 11	Muhlenberg	Bucknell Memorial Stadium; Lewisburg, PA	W 33–0		
October 18	Lafayette^{†}	Bucknell Memorial Stadium; Lewisburg, PA	L 3–21		
October 25	at Georgetown	Griffith Stadium; Washington, DC	W 14–6		
November 1	Third Army Corps	Bucknell Memorial Stadium; Lewisburg, PA	W 26–7		
November 8	vs. Gettysburg	Altoona, PA	W 22–6	10,000	
November 15	at Navy	Farragut Field; Annapolis, MD	W 6–0		
November 22	vs. Rutgers	Franklin Field; Philadelphia, PA	W 12–7		
November 27	Dickinson	Bucknell Memorial Stadium; Lewisburg, PA	L 7–11		
^{†}Homecoming
