= George Sanford (American football) =

American football player and coach (1870–1938)

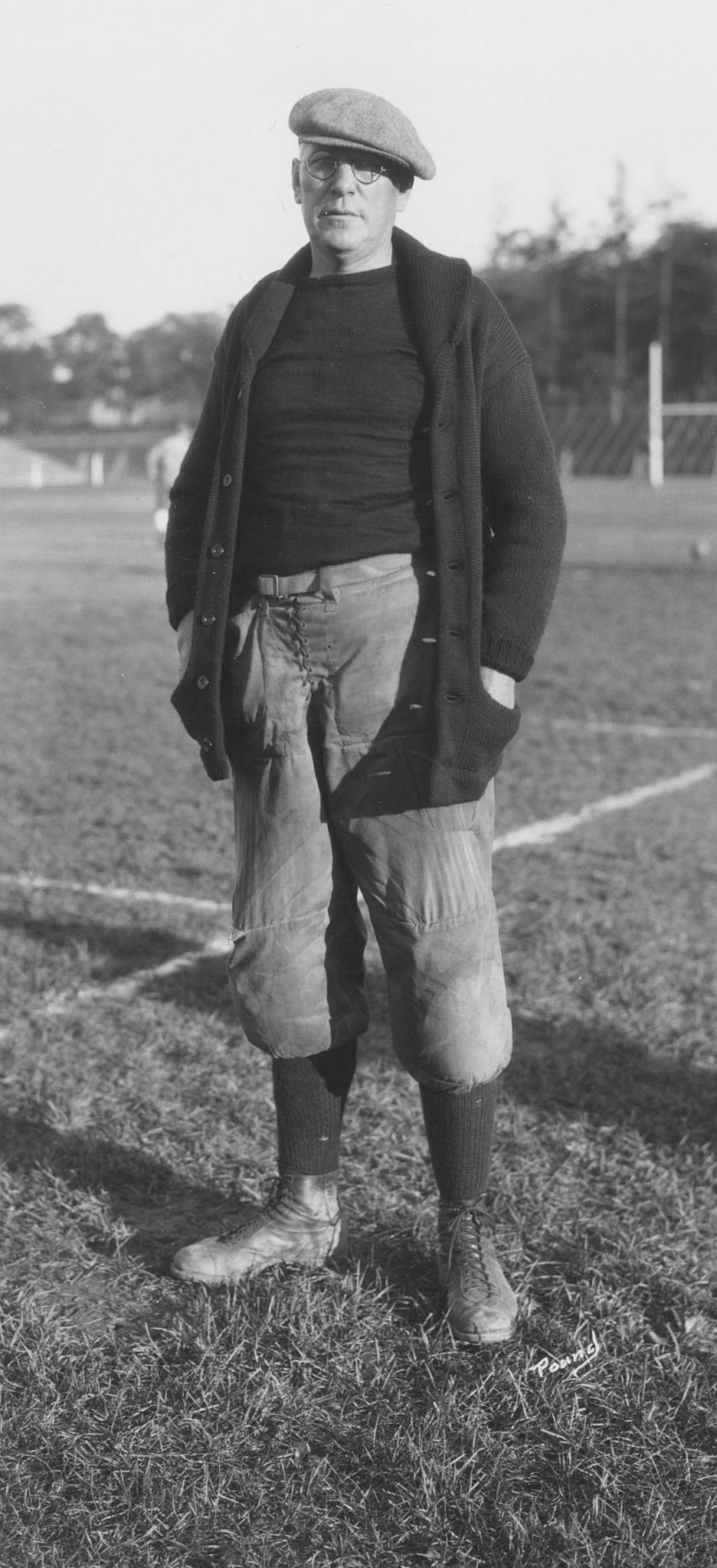
- Sanford in 1913

Biographical details
- Born: June 4, 1870; Ashland, New York, U.S.
- Died: May 23, 1938 (aged 67); New York, New York, U.S.

Playing career
- 1891–1895: Yale
- Position: Center

Coaching career (HC unless noted)
- 1896: Cornell
- 1897–1898: Yale (assistant)
- 1899–1901: Columbia
- 1903: Yale (assistant)
- 1904: Virginia
- 1905: Yale (assistant)
- 1910–1912: Yale (assistant)
- 1913–1923: Rutgers

Head coaching record
- Overall: 84–46–6
- College Football Hall of Fame; Inducted in 1971 (profile)

George Foster "Sandy" Sanford (June 4, 1870 – May 23, 1938) was an American college football player and coach. He served as the head coach at Cornell University (1896), Columbia University (1899–1901), the University of Virginia (1904), and Rutgers University (1913–1923), compiling a career coaching record of 89–49–7. Sanford was inducted into the College Football Hall of Fame as a coach in 1971.

== Playing career ==
Sanford started at center on the 1891 Yale Bulldogs football team and left guard on the 1892 team, but missed the final three games of the latter season due to a broken ankle. He graduated from Sheffield Scientific School in 1893, but was allowed to stay on the football team due to a rule change that allowed graduate students (Sanford was attending Yale Law School) to play college football. Sanford was also a member of the Yale track team and in 1894 competed in the Yale-Oxford games in England and the Amateur Athletic Union Outdoor Track and Field Championships at Travers Island, New York. He was declared ineligible for the 1895 football season finale against Princeton because he did not register as a student before that year's deadline. He graduated from Yale Law School in 1896, but passed on a legal career to go into coaching.

== Coaching ==
Sanford began his coaching career at in 1896 at Cornell. He assisted Yale during the 1897 and 1888 seasons. In 1899, he became the first paid coach at Columbia University, receiving $5,000 a year. He was let go in 1902 in favor of Bill Morley. He spent that year out of football, instead working in the locomotive business in Chicago. He helped coach Yale during the final three weeks of the 1903 season. In 1904, he was the head coach at the University of Virginia. In 1905, 1910, 1911, and 1912, he assisted at Yale when it did not interfere with his business commitments.

From 1913 to 1923, Sanford was the head coach at Rutgers University. His 1915 scored more points than any other eastern college football team. Sanford's players at Rutgers included Paul Robeson and Homer Hazel. After his retirement from coaching, Sanford remained involved with the football program as an advisor to his successor, John Wallace. Throughout his time at Rutgers, Sanford did not collect a salary and worked full time as an insurance broker in New York City.

== Later life ==
After retiring from coaching, Sanford was president of the insurance brokerage firm of Smyth, Sanford & Gerard, Inc. in Manhattan, New York City. He died of a heart attack on May 23, 1938, at the age of 67 at Presbyterian Hospital in Manhattan. He was survived by his wife and two children. His son, Foster Sanford Jr., was a member of the University of Pennsylvania baseball, football, and track teams and was a member of the University's board of trustees from 1958 to 1968.

== Head coaching record ==
| Year | Team | Overall | Conference | Standing | Bowl/playoffs |
|---|---|---|---|---|---|
Cornell Big Red (Independent) (1896)
| 1896 | Cornell | 5–3–1 | | | |
| Cornell: | | 5–3–1 | | | |
Columbia Blue and White (Independent) (1899–1901)
| 1899 | Columbia | 8–3 | | | |
| 1900 | Columbia | 6–3–1 | | | |
| 1901 | Columbia | 8–5 | | | |
| Columbia: | | 22–11–1 | | | |
Virginia Orange and Blue (Independent) (1904)
| 1904 | Virginia | 6–3 | | | |
| Virginia: | | 6–3 | | | |
Rutgers Queensmen (Independent) (1904)
| 1913 | Rutgers | 6–3 | | | |
| 1914 | Rutgers | 5–3–1 | | | |
| 1915 | Rutgers | 7–1 | | | |
| 1916 | Rutgers | 3–2–2 | | | |
| 1917 | Rutgers | 7–1–1 | | | |
| 1918 | Rutgers | 5–2 | | | |
| 1919 | Rutgers | 5–3 | | | |
| 1920 | Rutgers | 2–7 | | | |
| 1921 | Rutgers | 4–5 | | | |
| 1922 | Rutgers | 5–4 | | | |
| 1923 | Rutgers | 7–1–1 | | | |
| Rutgers: | | 56–32–5 | | | |
| Total: | | 89–49–7 | | | |
