= 1924 Syracuse Orangemen football team =

American college football season

1924 Syracuse Orangemen football
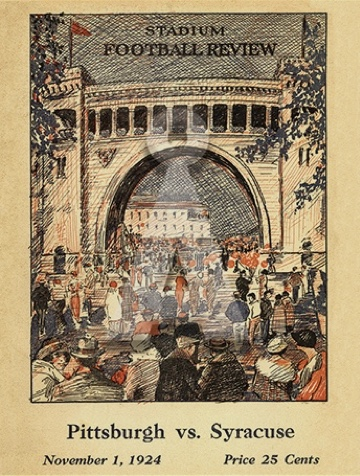
- 1924 organised Syracuse University Football Program VS Pittsburgh, Published by Syracuse University
- Conference: Independent
- Record: 8–2–1
- Head coach: Chick Meehan (5th season)
- Captain: Roy Simmons Sr.
- Home stadium: Archbold Stadium

1924 Eastern college football independents records
	Conf.			Overall
Team	W	L	T	W		L		T
No. 9 Dartmouth		–		7	–	0	–	1
No. 3 Yale		–		6	–	0	–	2
No. 8 Penn		–		9	–	1	–	1
Rutgers		–		7	–	1	–	1
Bucknell		–		8	–	2	–	0
Lafayette		–		7	–	2	–	0
Washington & Jefferson		–		7	–	2	–	0
Holy Cross		–		7	–	1	–	1
Army		–		5	–	1	–	2
Syracuse		–		8	–	2	–	1
Fordham		–		6	–	2	–	0
Lehigh		–		4	–	1	–	3
Boston College		–		6	–	3	–	0
Penn State		–		6	–	3	–	1
Princeton		–		4	–	2	–	1
Springfield		–		4	–	2	–	1
Columbia		–		5	–	3	–	1
Pittsburgh		–		5	–	3	–	1
NYU		–		4	–	3	–	1
CCNY		–		4	–	3	–	0
Brown		–		5	–	4	–	0
Carnegie Tech		–		5	–	4	–	0
Colgate		–		5	–	4	–	0
Cornell		–		4	–	4	–	0
Harvard		–		4	–	4	–	0
Tufts		–		3	–	4	–	2
Franklin & Marshall		–		3	–	5	–	1
Villanova		–		2	–	5	–	1
Drexel		–		2	–	7	–	0
Vermont		–		2	–	7	–	0
Temple		–		1	–	4	–	0
Boston University		–		1	–	5	–	0
Buffalo		–		1	–	7	–	0
Rankings from Dickinson System

The 1924 Syracuse Orangemen football team represented Syracuse University as an independent during the 1924 NCAA football season. The head coach was Chick Meehan, coaching his fifth season with the Orangemen. The team played their home games at Archbold Stadium in Syracuse, New York.

== Schedule ==
Date	Opponent	Site	Result	Attendance	Source
September 27	Hobart	Archbold Stadium; Syracuse, NY	W 35–0	8,500	
October 4	Mercer	Archbold Stadium; Syracuse, NY	W 26–0	10,000	
October 11	at William & Mary	Archbold Stadium; Syracuse, NY	W 24–7	12,000	
October 18	Boston College	Archbold Stadium; Syracuse, NY	W 10–0	20,000	
October 25	at Penn State	New Beaver Field; State College, PA (rivalry)	W 10–6		
November 1	Pittsburgh	Archbold Stadium; Syracuse, NY (rivalry)	T 7–7	20,000	
November 8	West Virginia Wesleyan	Archbold Stadium; Syracuse, NY	L 3–7		
November 15	Niagara	Archbold Stadium; Syracuse, NY	W 23–6	8,000	
November 22	Colgate	Archbold Stadium; Syracuse, NY (rivalry)	W 7–3	30,000	
November 27	at Columbia	Polo Grounds; Manhattan, NY	W 9–6	45,000	
December 6	at USC	Los Angeles Memorial Coliseum; Los Angeles, CA	L 0–16	49,000	
