= 1924 Buffalo Bisons football team =

American college football season

1924 Buffalo Bisons football
- Conference: Independent
- Record: 1–7
- Head coach: Russ Carrick (1st season)
- Home stadium: Rotary Field

1924 Eastern college football independents records
	Conf.			Overall
Team	W	L	T	W		L		T
No. 9 Dartmouth		–		7	–	0	–	1
No. 3 Yale		–		6	–	0	–	2
No. 8 Penn		–		9	–	1	–	1
Rutgers		–		7	–	1	–	1
Bucknell		–		8	–	2	–	0
Lafayette		–		7	–	2	–	0
Washington & Jefferson		–		7	–	2	–	0
Holy Cross		–		7	–	1	–	1
Army		–		5	–	1	–	2
Syracuse		–		8	–	2	–	1
Fordham		–		6	–	2	–	0
Lehigh		–		4	–	1	–	3
Boston College		–		6	–	3	–	0
Penn State		–		6	–	3	–	1
Princeton		–		4	–	2	–	1
Springfield		–		4	–	2	–	1
Columbia		–		5	–	3	–	1
Pittsburgh		–		5	–	3	–	1
NYU		–		4	–	3	–	1
CCNY		–		4	–	3	–	0
Brown		–		5	–	4	–	0
Carnegie Tech		–		5	–	4	–	0
Colgate		–		5	–	4	–	0
Cornell		–		4	–	4	–	0
Harvard		–		4	–	4	–	0
Tufts		–		3	–	4	–	2
Franklin & Marshall		–		3	–	5	–	1
Villanova		–		2	–	5	–	1
Drexel		–		2	–	7	–	0
Vermont		–		2	–	7	–	0
Temple		–		1	–	4	–	0
Boston University		–		1	–	5	–	0
Buffalo		–		1	–	7	–	0
Rankings from Dickinson System

The 1924 Buffalo Bisons football team represented the University of Buffalo as an independent during the 1924 college football season. Led by Russ Carrick in his first season as head coach, the team compiled a record of 1–7.

== Schedule ==
Date	Opponent	Site	Result	Source
October 4	Westminster (PA)	Rotary Field; Buffalo, NY	L 7–16	
October 11	Alfred	Rotary Field; Buffalo, NY	L 0–9	
October 18	St. Lawrence	Rotary Field; Buffalo, NY	W 7–0	
October 25	at Davis & Elkins	Elkins, WV	L 0–48	
November 1	Clarkson	Rotary Field; Buffalo, NY	L 0–26	
November 8	at Rochester	Rochester, NY	L 7–21	
November 15	Hobart	Rotary Field; Buffalo, NY	L 6–13	
November 22	George Washington	Rotary Field; Buffalo, NY	L 0–6	
