= 1924 Harvard Crimson football team =

American college football season

1924 Harvard Crimson football
- Conference: Independent
- Record: 4–4
- Head coach: Bob Fisher (6th season)
- Captain: Malcolm W. Greenough
- Home stadium: Harvard Stadium

1924 Eastern college football independents records
	Conf.			Overall
Team	W	L	T	W		L		T
No. 9 Dartmouth		–		7	–	0	–	1
No. 3 Yale		–		6	–	0	–	2
No. 8 Penn		–		9	–	1	–	1
Rutgers		–		7	–	1	–	1
Bucknell		–		8	–	2	–	0
Lafayette		–		7	–	2	–	0
Washington & Jefferson		–		7	–	2	–	0
Holy Cross		–		7	–	1	–	1
Army		–		5	–	1	–	2
Syracuse		–		8	–	2	–	1
Fordham		–		6	–	2	–	0
Lehigh		–		4	–	1	–	3
Boston College		–		6	–	3	–	0
Penn State		–		6	–	3	–	1
Princeton		–		4	–	2	–	1
Springfield		–		4	–	2	–	1
Columbia		–		5	–	3	–	1
Pittsburgh		–		5	–	3	–	1
NYU		–		4	–	3	–	1
CCNY		–		4	–	3	–	0
Brown		–		5	–	4	–	0
Carnegie Tech		–		5	–	4	–	0
Colgate		–		5	–	4	–	0
Cornell		–		4	–	4	–	0
Harvard		–		4	–	4	–	0
Tufts		–		3	–	4	–	2
Franklin & Marshall		–		3	–	5	–	1
Villanova		–		2	–	5	–	1
Drexel		–		2	–	7	–	0
Vermont		–		2	–	7	–	0
Temple		–		1	–	4	–	0
Boston University		–		1	–	5	–	0
Buffalo		–		1	–	7	–	0
Rankings from Dickinson System

The 1924 Harvard Crimson football team represented Harvard University in the 1924 college football season. In its sixth season under head coach Bob Fisher, Harvard compiled a 4–4 record and outscored opponents by a total of 78 to 61. Malcolm W. Greenough was the team captain. The team played its home games at Harvard Stadium in Boston.

== Schedule ==
Date	Time	Opponent	Site	Result	Attendance	Source
October 4		Virginia	Harvard Stadium; Boston, MA	W 14–0		
October 11		Middlebury	Harvard Stadium; Boston, MA	W 16–6		
October 18		Holy Cross	Harvard Stadium; Boston, MA	W 12–6		
October 25		Dartmouth	Harvard Stadium; Boston, MA (rivalry)	L 0–6	51,000	
November 1		Boston University	Harvard Stadium; Boston, MA	W 13–0		
November 8		Princeton	Harvard Stadium; Boston, MA (rivalry)	L 0–34		
November 15	2:00 p.m.	Brown	Harvard Stadium; Boston, MA	L 0–7		
November 22		at Yale	Yale Bowl; New Haven, CT (rivalry)	L 6–19		
All times are in Eastern time
