= 1924 Yale Bulldogs football team =

American college football season

1924 Yale Bulldogs football
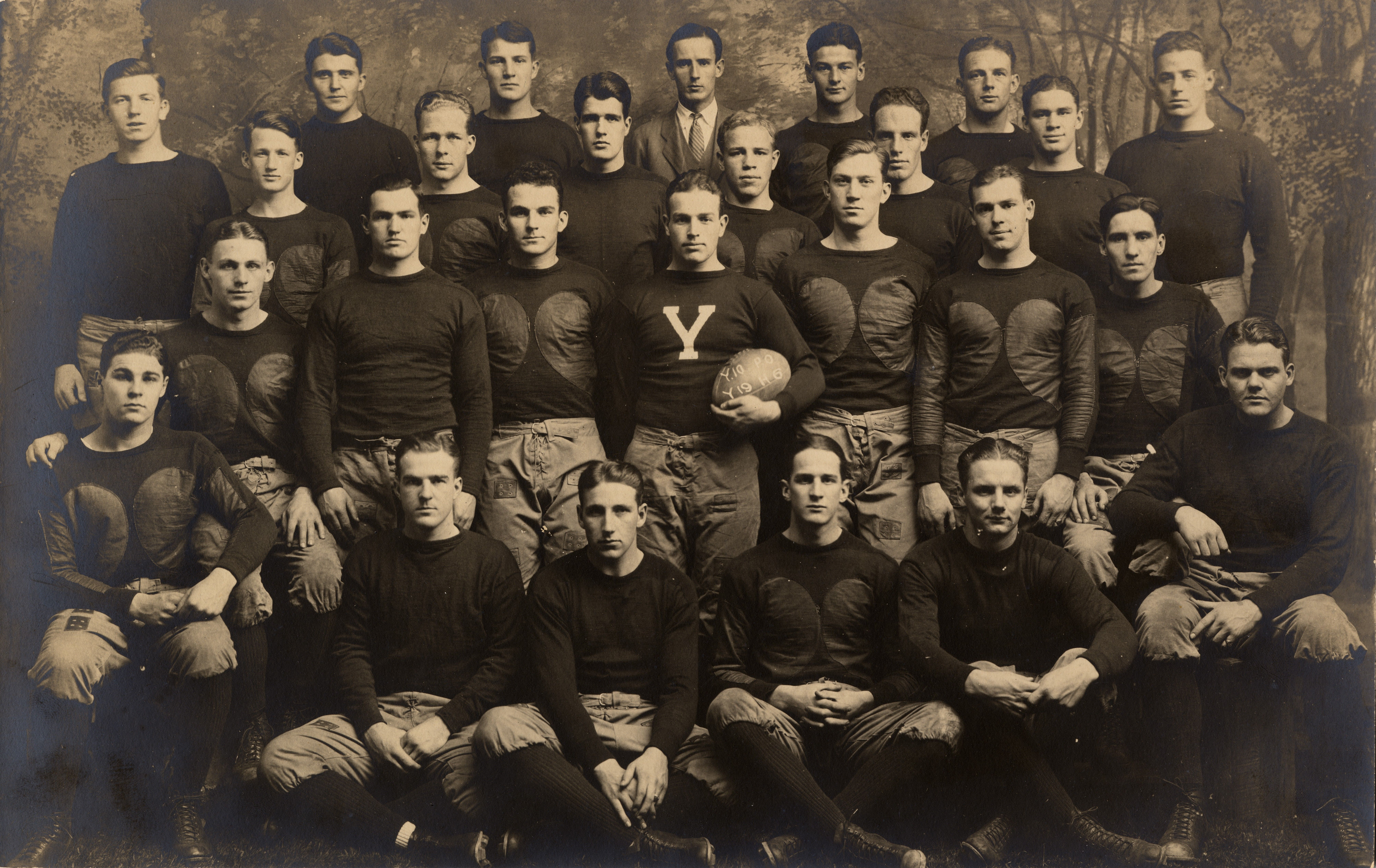
- Conference: Independent
- Record: 6–0–2
- Head coach: Tad Jones (7th season)
- Offensive scheme: Single-wing
- Captain: Winslow Lovejoy
- Home stadium: Yale Bowl

1924 Eastern college football independents records
| | Conf. | | | Overall |
| Team | W | L | T | W | | L | | T |
|---|---|---|---|---|---|---|---|---|
| No. 9 Dartmouth | | – | | 7 | – | 0 | – | 1 |
| No. 3 Yale | | – | | 6 | – | 0 | – | 2 |
| No. 8 Penn | | – | | 9 | – | 1 | – | 1 |
| Rutgers | | – | | 7 | – | 1 | – | 1 |
| Bucknell | | – | | 8 | – | 2 | – | 0 |
| Lafayette | | – | | 7 | – | 2 | – | 0 |
| Washington & Jefferson | | – | | 7 | – | 2 | – | 0 |
| Holy Cross | | – | | 7 | – | 1 | – | 1 |
| Army | | – | | 5 | – | 1 | – | 2 |
| Syracuse | | – | | 8 | – | 2 | – | 1 |
| Fordham | | – | | 6 | – | 2 | – | 0 |
| Lehigh | | – | | 4 | – | 1 | – | 3 |
| Boston College | | – | | 6 | – | 3 | – | 0 |
| Penn State | | – | | 6 | – | 3 | – | 1 |
| Princeton | | – | | 4 | – | 2 | – | 1 |
| Springfield | | – | | 4 | – | 2 | – | 1 |
| Columbia | | – | | 5 | – | 3 | – | 1 |
| Pittsburgh | | – | | 5 | – | 3 | – | 1 |
| NYU | | – | | 4 | – | 3 | – | 1 |
| CCNY | | – | | 4 | – | 3 | – | 0 |
| Brown | | – | | 5 | – | 4 | – | 0 |
| Carnegie Tech | | – | | 5 | – | 4 | – | 0 |
| Colgate | | – | | 5 | – | 4 | – | 0 |
| Cornell | | – | | 4 | – | 4 | – | 0 |
| Harvard | | – | | 4 | – | 4 | – | 0 |
| Tufts | | – | | 3 | – | 4 | – | 2 |
| Franklin & Marshall | | – | | 3 | – | 5 | – | 1 |
| Villanova | | – | | 2 | – | 5 | – | 1 |
| Drexel | | – | | 2 | – | 7 | – | 0 |
| Vermont | | – | | 2 | – | 7 | – | 0 |
| Temple | | – | | 1 | – | 4 | – | 0 |
| Boston University | | – | | 1 | – | 5 | – | 0 |
| Buffalo | | – | | 1 | – | 7 | – | 0 |
Rankings from Dickinson System

The 1924 Yale Bulldogs football team represented Yale University in the 1924 college football season. The Bulldogs opened the season with victories over North Carolina and Georgia and concluded the season with victories over rivals Princeton and Harvard. The team finished with an undefeated 6–0–2 record under seventh-year head coach Tad Jones. The two ties were against Dartmouth and Army.

Yale end Richard Luman was named a consensus selection for the 1924 College Football All-America Team, having been so honored by the All-America Board and the International News Service. Other Yale players receiving first-team All-American honors in 1924 were center Winslow Lovejoy (All-America Board, Football World, All-Sports Magazine, and Norman E. Brown), halfback Ducky Pond (Newspaper Editors Association and Billy Evans), and tackle Johnny Joss (Lawrence Perry).

== Schedule ==
| Date | Time | Opponent | Site | Result | Attendance | Source |
|---|---|---|---|---|---|---|
| October 4 | | North Carolina | Yale Bowl; New Haven, CT | W 27–0 | 25,000 | |
| October 11 | | Georgia | Yale Bowl; New Haven, CT | W 7–6 | | |
| October 18 | | Dartmouth | Yale Bowl; New Haven, CT | T 14–14 | 42,000 | |
| October 25 | 2:00 p.m. | Brown | Yale Bowl; New Haven, CT | W 13–3 | 45,000 | |
| November 1 | | Army | Yale Bowl; New Haven, CT | T 7–7 | 80,000 | |
| November 8 | | Maryland | Yale Bowl; New Haven, CT | W 47–0 | 18,000 | |
| November 15 | | at Princeton | Palmer Stadium; Princeton, NJ (rivalry) | W 10–0 | | |
| November 22 | | Harvard | Yale Bowl; New Haven, CT (rivalry) | W 19–6 | | |
All times are in Eastern time
