= John Wallis (disambiguation) =

John Wallis (1616–1703) was an English mathematician.

John Wallis may also refer to:

- John Wallis (antiquary) (1714–1793), English cleric and county historian
- John Wallis (Canadian politician) (fl. 1815–1872), Canadian politician
- John Wallis (Arabic scholar) (c. 1674–1738), Laudian Professor of Arabic at the University of Oxford
- John Wallis (publisher) (died 1818), publisher of board games
- John Wallis (MP for King's Lynn) (c. 1567–1633), English merchant and politician
- John Braithwaite Wallis (1877–1961), Canadian entomologist
- J. E. P. Wallis (1861–1946), Anglo-Indian judge

== See also ==
- Jon Wallis (born 1986), English footballer
- John Wallace (disambiguation)
- John Wallis Titt (1841–1910), mechanical engineer and builder of a particular design of large wind engine
