= 1924 Princeton Tigers football team =

American college football season

1924 Princeton Tigers football
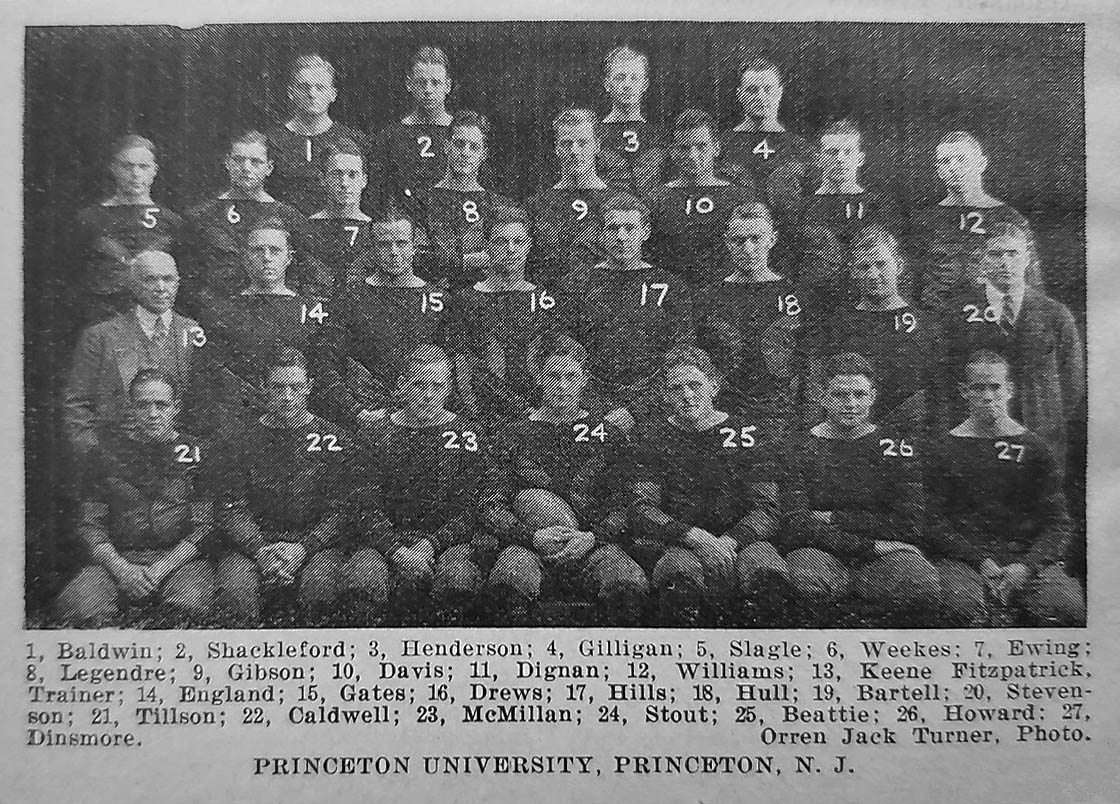
- Conference: Independent
- Record: 4–2–1
- Head coach: Bill Roper (11th season)
- Captain: Ed Stout
- Home stadium: Palmer Stadium

1924 Eastern college football independents records
	Conf.			Overall
Team	W	L	T	W		L		T
No. 9 Dartmouth		–		7	–	0	–	1
No. 3 Yale		–		6	–	0	–	2
No. 8 Penn		–		9	–	1	–	1
Rutgers		–		7	–	1	–	1
Bucknell		–		8	–	2	–	0
Lafayette		–		7	–	2	–	0
Washington & Jefferson		–		7	–	2	–	0
Holy Cross		–		7	–	1	–	1
Army		–		5	–	1	–	2
Syracuse		–		8	–	2	–	1
Fordham		–		6	–	2	–	0
Lehigh		–		4	–	1	–	3
Boston College		–		6	–	3	–	0
Penn State		–		6	–	3	–	1
Princeton		–		4	–	2	–	1
Springfield		–		4	–	2	–	1
Columbia		–		5	–	3	–	1
Pittsburgh		–		5	–	3	–	1
NYU		–		4	–	3	–	1
CCNY		–		4	–	3	–	0
Brown		–		5	–	4	–	0
Carnegie Tech		–		5	–	4	–	0
Colgate		–		5	–	4	–	0
Cornell		–		4	–	4	–	0
Harvard		–		4	–	4	–	0
Tufts		–		3	–	4	–	2
Franklin & Marshall		–		3	–	5	–	1
Villanova		–		2	–	5	–	1
Drexel		–		2	–	7	–	0
Vermont		–		2	–	7	–	0
Temple		–		1	–	4	–	0
Boston University		–		1	–	5	–	0
Buffalo		–		1	–	7	–	0
Rankings from Dickinson System

The 1924 Princeton Tigers football team represented Princeton University in the 1924 college football season. Playing six of its seven games at home, the team finished with a 4–2–1 record under 11th-year head coach Bill Roper. No Princeton players were consensus honorees on the 1924 College Football All-America Team, but two players received first-team honors from at least one selector. They are: end Edmond Stout (Football World and All-Sports Magazine magazines), and tackle Bob Beattie (NEA, Billy Evans and Walter Eckersall),

== Schedule ==
Date	Opponent	Site	Result	Attendance	Source
October 4	Amherst	Palmer Stadium; Princeton, NJ	W 40–6		
October 11	Lehigh	Palmer Stadium; Princeton, NJ	T 0–0		
October 18	Navy	Palmer Stadium; Princeton, NJ	W 17–14		
October 25	Notre Dame	Palmer Stadium; Princeton, NJ	L 0–12	40,000	
November 1	Swarthmore	Palmer Stadium; Princeton, NJ	W 21–6		
November 8	at Harvard	Harvard Stadium; Boston, MA (rivalry)	W 34–0		
November 15	Yale	Palmer Stadium; Princeton, NJ (rivalry)	L 0–10		
