= Charles Whelan =

American football player and coach

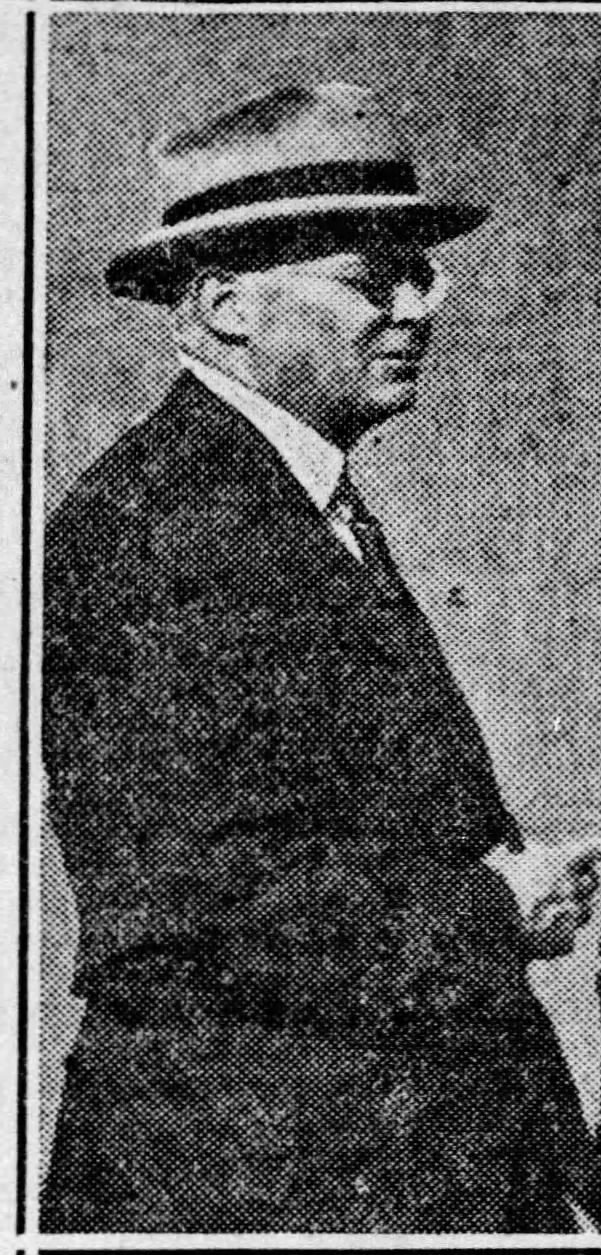
- Whelan in 1925

Biographical details
- Born: April 3, 1877; Weymouth, Massachusetts, U.S.
- Died: May 29, 1945 (aged 68); Cohasset, Massachusetts, U.S.
- Education: Dartmouth College; Tufts School of Medicine

Playing career
- 1899–1900: Dartmouth
- Position: Fullback

Coaching career (HC unless noted)
- 1903–1907: Tufts
- 1910: Dartmouth (assistant)
- 1912–1917: Tufts
- 1919: Tufts
- 1921–1925: Boston University

Head coaching record
- Overall: 54–68–7

Charles "Doc" Whelan (April 3, 1877 – May 29, 1945) was an American football player and coach and physician. He served as the head football coach at Tufts College—now Tufts University—for three stints (1903–1907, 1912–1917, and 1919) and at Boston University from 1921 to 1925, compiling a career college football record of 54–68–7. Whelan also coached track at Harvard University. He died after a brief illness in 1945.

== Early life ==
Whelan was born on April 3, 1877, in Weymouth, Massachusetts. He graduated from Weymouth High School in 1896 and entered Dartmouth College that fall. He left after one year to work in Boston, but returned a year later and graduated in 1901. While at Dartmouth, Whelan played fullback on the school's football team and specialized in the broad jump and the shotput on the track team.

== Coaching career ==
Whelan worked his way through the Tufts School of Medicine by serving as coach of the school's football team and as the athletic director at the Volkmann School. After graduating, Whelan left athletics to work as a physician, but returned to football in 1910 as an assistant coach at Dartmouth. He returned to Tufts in 1912 and remained with the school until 1920 when he became supervisor of the Harvard Crimson track team and a professor of hygiene at Harvard College (he missed the 1918 season due to military service). His tenure at Harvard was short-lived as he submitted his resignation less than three months after taking the job to return to medicine. His final coaching position was at Boston University, where he served as head football coach from 1921 to 1925.

== Medical career ==
Whelan was a pioneer in radiology. He was the chief radiologist at Quincy City Hospital and was the head of the x-ray at the New York Port of Embarkation Hospital during World War I. He was also a consultant at Carney Hospital and the New England Hospital for Women and Children.

== Head coaching record ==
Year	Team	Overall	Conference	Standing	Bowl/playoffs
Tufts Jumbos (Independent) (1903–1907)
1903	Tufts	5–8			
1904	Tufts	2–9–1			
1905	Tufts	5–3			
1906	Tufts	6–2			
1907	Tufts	3–4–1			
Tufts Jumbos (Independent) (1912–1917)
1912	Tufts	5–4			
1913	Tufts	7–1			
1914	Tufts	5–3			
1915	Tufts	5–1–2			
1916	Tufts	5–3			
1917	Tufts	3–3			
Tufts Jumbos (Independent) (1919)
1919	Tufts	2–5			
Tufts:		43–46–4			
Boston University Terriers (Independent) (1921–1925)
1921	Boston University	6–2			
1922	Boston University	2–4–3			
1923	Boston University	1–6			
1924	Boston University	1–5			
1925	Boston University	1–5			
Boston University:		11–22–3			
Total:		54–68–7			
