= 1924 Penn Quakers football team =

American college football season

1924 Penn Quakers football

National champion (Davis)
- Conference: Independent
- Record: 9–1–1
- Head coach: Lou Young (2nd season)
- Captain: Rea McGraw
- Home stadium: Franklin Field

1924 Eastern college football independents records
	Conf.			Overall
Team	W	L	T	W		L		T
No. 9 Dartmouth		–		7	–	0	–	1
No. 3 Yale		–		6	–	0	–	2
No. 8 Penn		–		9	–	1	–	1
Rutgers		–		7	–	1	–	1
Bucknell		–		8	–	2	–	0
Lafayette		–		7	–	2	–	0
Washington & Jefferson		–		7	–	2	–	0
Holy Cross		–		7	–	1	–	1
Army		–		5	–	1	–	2
Syracuse		–		8	–	2	–	1
Fordham		–		6	–	2	–	0
Lehigh		–		4	–	1	–	3
Boston College		–		6	–	3	–	0
Penn State		–		6	–	3	–	1
Princeton		–		4	–	2	–	1
Springfield		–		4	–	2	–	1
Columbia		–		5	–	3	–	1
Pittsburgh		–		5	–	3	–	1
NYU		–		4	–	3	–	1
CCNY		–		4	–	3	–	0
Brown		–		5	–	4	–	0
Carnegie Tech		–		5	–	4	–	0
Colgate		–		5	–	4	–	0
Cornell		–		4	–	4	–	0
Harvard		–		4	–	4	–	0
Tufts		–		3	–	4	–	2
Franklin & Marshall		–		3	–	5	–	1
Villanova		–		2	–	5	–	1
Drexel		–		2	–	7	–	0
Vermont		–		2	–	7	–	0
Temple		–		1	–	4	–	0
Boston University		–		1	–	5	–	0
Buffalo		–		1	–	7	–	0
Rankings from Dickinson System

The 1924 Penn Quakers football team represented the University of Pennsylvania in the 1924 college football season. Playing its entire regular season schedule at home, the team finished with a 9–1–1 record and was retroactively named as the 1924 national champion by Parke H. Davis. They outscored their opponents 203 to 31.

== Schedule ==
Date	Opponent	Site	Result	Attendance	Source
September 27	Ursinus	Franklin Field; Philadelphia, PA	W 34–0	32,000	
October 1	Drexel	Franklin Field; Philadelphia, PA	W 52–0	10,000	
October 4	Franklin & Marshall	Franklin Field; Philadelphia, PA	W 26–0	40,000	
October 11	Swarthmore	Franklin Field; Philadelphia, PA	W 25–7	40,000	
October 18	Columbia	Franklin Field; Philadelphia, PA	W 10–7	45,000	
October 25	Virginia	Franklin Field; Philadelphia, PA	W 27–0	30,000	
November 1	Lafayette	Franklin Field; Philadelphia, PA	W 6–3	54,000	
November 8	Georgetown	Franklin Field; Philadelphia, PA	W 3–0	34,000	
November 15	Penn State	Franklin Field; Philadelphia, PA	T 0–0	52,000	
November 27	Cornell	Franklin Field; Philadelphia, PA (rivalry)	W 20–0	56,000	
January 1, 1925	at California	California Memorial Stadium; Berkeley, CA	L 0–14	60,000	

== Roster ==
- Bennett, E
- Butler, G
- Coleman, G
- Clark Craig, E
- Dewhirst, T
- Douglas, HB
- Fairchild, E
- Fields, QB
- Flues, HB
- Hayes, E
- Kauffman, G
- Al Kreuz, FB
- Laird, QB
- Leth, HB
- Marous, T
- Ed McGinley, T
- Rea McGraw, HB
- Nicholas, FB
- Alton Papworth, G
- Robinson, C
- Scheerer, G
- Singer, E
- Sorenson, HB
- Snyder, C
- George Thayer, T
- Thomas, QB
- Joseph Putnam Willson, T
