= 1924 Boston College Eagles football team =

American college football season

1924 Boston College Eagles football
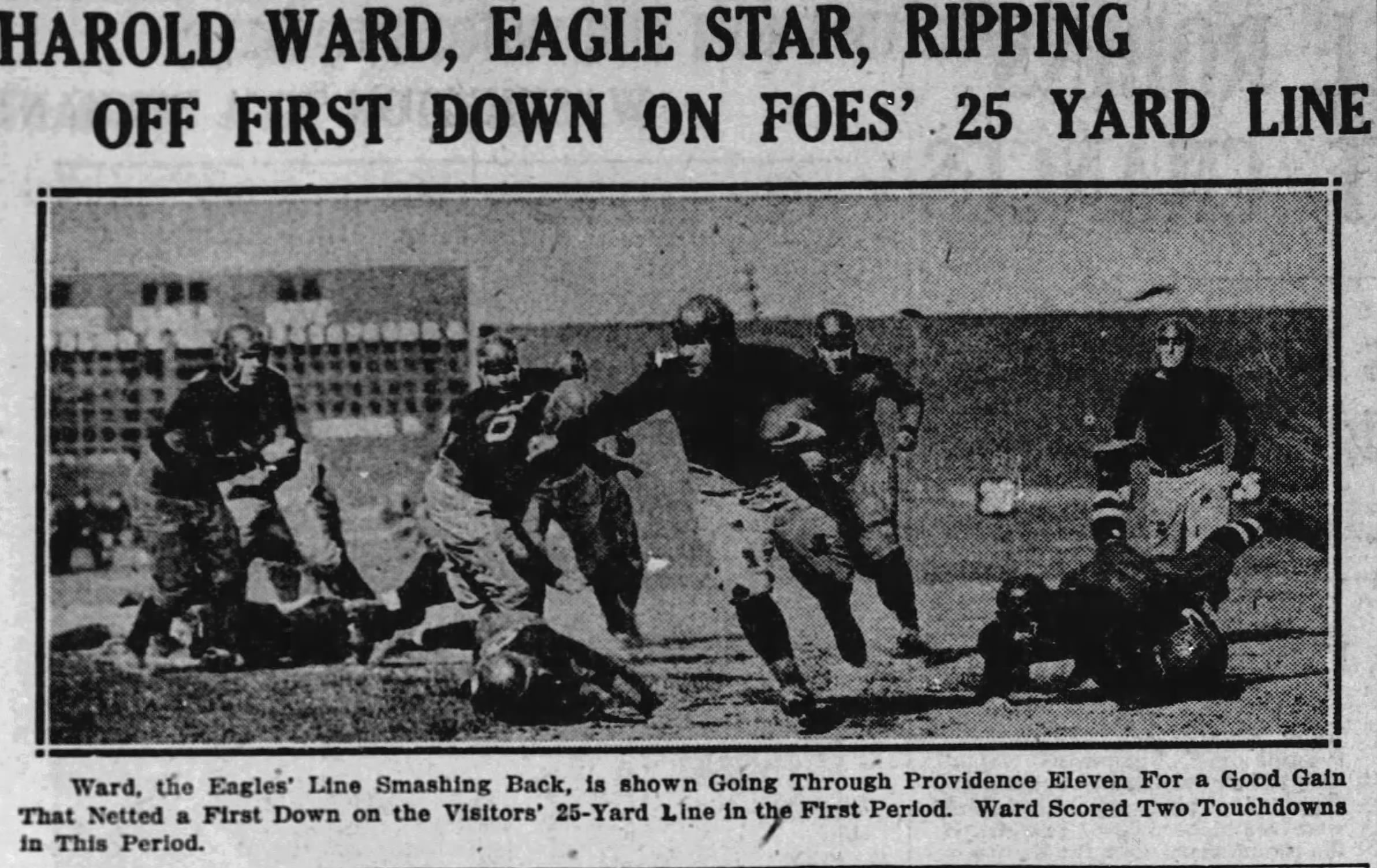
- Photograph from the September 27, 1924 football game between Boston College and Providence College
- Conference: Independent
- Record: 6–3
- Head coach: Frank Cavanaugh (6th season)
- Captain: Joe Kozlowsky
- Home stadium: Braves Field

1924 Eastern college football independents records
	Conf.			Overall
Team	W	L	T	W		L		T
No. 9 Dartmouth		–		7	–	0	–	1
No. 3 Yale		–		6	–	0	–	2
No. 8 Penn		–		9	–	1	–	1
Rutgers		–		7	–	1	–	1
Bucknell		–		8	–	2	–	0
Lafayette		–		7	–	2	–	0
Washington & Jefferson		–		7	–	2	–	0
Holy Cross		–		7	–	1	–	1
Army		–		5	–	1	–	2
Syracuse		–		8	–	2	–	1
Fordham		–		6	–	2	–	0
Lehigh		–		4	–	1	–	3
Boston College		–		6	–	3	–	0
Penn State		–		6	–	3	–	1
Princeton		–		4	–	2	–	1
Springfield		–		4	–	2	–	1
Columbia		–		5	–	3	–	1
Pittsburgh		–		5	–	3	–	1
NYU		–		4	–	3	–	1
CCNY		–		4	–	3	–	0
Brown		–		5	–	4	–	0
Carnegie Tech		–		5	–	4	–	0
Colgate		–		5	–	4	–	0
Cornell		–		4	–	4	–	0
Harvard		–		4	–	4	–	0
Tufts		–		3	–	4	–	2
Franklin & Marshall		–		3	–	5	–	1
Villanova		–		2	–	5	–	1
Drexel		–		2	–	7	–	0
Vermont		–		2	–	7	–	0
Temple		–		1	–	4	–	0
Boston University		–		1	–	5	–	0
Buffalo		–		1	–	7	–	0
Rankings from Dickinson System

The 1924 Boston College Eagles football team represented Boston College an independent during the 1924 college football season. Led sixth-year head coach Frank Cavanaugh, Boston College compiled a record of 6–3.

== Schedule ==
Date	Time	Opponent	Site	Result	Attendance	Source
September 27	2:30 p.m.	Providence College	Braves Field; Boston, MA	W 47–0	9,000	
October 13	2:30 p.m.	Fordham	Braves Field; Boston, MA	W 28–0	20,000	
October 18		at Syracuse	Archbold Stadium; Syracuse, NY	L 0–10	20,000	
October 25		Allegheny	Braves Field; Boston, MA	W 13–0	8,500	
November 1	2:00 p.m.	Haskell	Braves Field; Boston, MA	W 34–7	30,000	
November 8		Marquette	Braves Field; Boston, MA	W 34–7	14,000	
November 15	2:00 p.m.	Centenary	Braves Field; Boston, MA	L 9–10	12,000	
November 22	2:00 p.m.	Vermont	Braves Field; Boston, MA	W 33–7		
November 29	2:00 p.m.	Holy Cross	Braves Field; Boston, MA (rivalry)	L 0–33	45,000	
All times are in Eastern time
