= 1924 Washington & Jefferson Presidents football team =

American college football season

1924 Washington & Jefferson Presidents football
- Conference: Independent
- Record: 7–2
- Head coach: David C. Morrow (7th season)
- Captain: Herb Kopf

1924 Eastern college football independents records
	Conf.			Overall
Team	W	L	T	W		L		T
No. 9 Dartmouth		–		7	–	0	–	1
No. 3 Yale		–		6	–	0	–	2
No. 8 Penn		–		9	–	1	–	1
Rutgers		–		7	–	1	–	1
Bucknell		–		8	–	2	–	0
Lafayette		–		7	–	2	–	0
Washington & Jefferson		–		7	–	2	–	0
Holy Cross		–		7	–	1	–	1
Army		–		5	–	1	–	2
Syracuse		–		8	–	2	–	1
Fordham		–		6	–	2	–	0
Lehigh		–		4	–	1	–	3
Boston College		–		6	–	3	–	0
Penn State		–		6	–	3	–	1
Princeton		–		4	–	2	–	1
Springfield		–		4	–	2	–	1
Columbia		–		5	–	3	–	1
Pittsburgh		–		5	–	3	–	1
NYU		–		4	–	3	–	1
CCNY		–		4	–	3	–	0
Brown		–		5	–	4	–	0
Carnegie Tech		–		5	–	4	–	0
Colgate		–		5	–	4	–	0
Cornell		–		4	–	4	–	0
Harvard		–		4	–	4	–	0
Tufts		–		3	–	4	–	2
Franklin & Marshall		–		3	–	5	–	1
Villanova		–		2	–	5	–	1
Drexel		–		2	–	7	–	0
Vermont		–		2	–	7	–	0
Temple		–		1	–	4	–	0
Boston University		–		1	–	5	–	0
Buffalo		–		1	–	7	–	0
Rankings from Dickinson System

The 1924 Washington & Jefferson Presidents football team was an American football team that represented Washington & Jefferson College as an independent during the 1924 college football season. The team compiled a 7–2 record. David C. Morrow was the head coach.

== Schedule ==
Date	Opponent	Site	Result	Attendance	Source
September 27	Geneva	Washington, PA	W 19–6		
October 4	Bethany (WV)	Washington, PA	W 19–13		
October 11	Grove City	Washington, PA	W 25–0		
October 18	at Carnegie Tech	Pittsburgh, PA	W 10–0		
October 25	vs. Lafayette	Yankee Stadium; Bronx, NY	L 6–20		
November 1	at Detroit	University of Detroit Stadium; Detroit, MI	W 18–6		
November 8	Waynesburg	Washington, PA	W 27–0		
November 15	at Pittsburgh	Forbes Field; Pittsburgh, PA	W 10–0	35,000	
November 27	at West Virginia	Mountaineer Field; Morgantown, WV	L 7–40		
