= 1924 Lafayette Leopards football team =

American football club

1924 Lafayette Leopards football
- Conference: Independent
- Record: 7–2
- Head coach: Herb McCracken (1st season)
- Captain: Charlie Berry
- Home stadium: March Field

1924 Eastern college football independents records
	Conf.			Overall
Team	W	L	T	W		L		T
No. 9 Dartmouth		–		7	–	0	–	1
No. 3 Yale		–		6	–	0	–	2
No. 8 Penn		–		9	–	1	–	1
Rutgers		–		7	–	1	–	1
Bucknell		–		8	–	2	–	0
Lafayette		–		7	–	2	–	0
Washington & Jefferson		–		7	–	2	–	0
Holy Cross		–		7	–	1	–	1
Army		–		5	–	1	–	2
Syracuse		–		8	–	2	–	1
Fordham		–		6	–	2	–	0
Lehigh		–		4	–	1	–	3
Boston College		–		6	–	3	–	0
Penn State		–		6	–	3	–	1
Princeton		–		4	–	2	–	1
Springfield		–		4	–	2	–	1
Columbia		–		5	–	3	–	1
Pittsburgh		–		5	–	3	–	1
NYU		–		4	–	3	–	1
CCNY		–		4	–	3	–	0
Brown		–		5	–	4	–	0
Carnegie Tech		–		5	–	4	–	0
Colgate		–		5	–	4	–	0
Cornell		–		4	–	4	–	0
Harvard		–		4	–	4	–	0
Tufts		–		3	–	4	–	2
Franklin & Marshall		–		3	–	5	–	1
Villanova		–		2	–	5	–	1
Drexel		–		2	–	7	–	0
Vermont		–		2	–	7	–	0
Temple		–		1	–	4	–	0
Boston University		–		1	–	5	–	0
Buffalo		–		1	–	7	–	0
Rankings from Dickinson System

The 1924 Lafayette Leopards football team was an American football team that represented Lafayette College as an independent during the 1924 college football season. In its first season under head coach Herb McCracken, the team compiled a 7–2 record. Charlie Berry was the team captain. The team played its home games at March Field in Easton, Pennsylvania.

== Schedule ==
Date	Opponent	Site	Result	Attendance	Source
September 27	Muhlenberg	March Field; Easton, PA	W 13–0		
October 4	at Pittsburgh	Forbes Field; Pittsburgh, PA	W 10–0	15,000	
October 11	Hobart	March Field; Easton, PA	W 30–0		
October 18	at Bucknell	Bucknell Memorial Stadium; Lewisburg, PA	W 21–3		
October 25	vs. Washington & Jefferson	Yankee Stadium; Bronx, NY	W 20–6		
November 1	at Penn	Franklin Field; Philadelphia, PA	L 3–6	54,000	
November 8	vs. Rutgers	Palmer Stadium; Princeton, NJ	L 7–43		
November 15	Alfred	March Field; Easton, PA	W 47–0		
November 22	Lehigh	March Field; Easton, PA (rivalry)	W 7–0		
