= Unchain Your Mind =

Unchain your Mind

Studio album by Heavyshift
- Released: 1995
- Recorded: 1994–1995
- Genre: Acid jazz, experimental, cinematic
- Label: Discovery, Wea

Unchain Your Mind is the first studio album by the Acid Jazz band Heavyshift. Released in 1995, it went on the Billboard Jazz chart at number two and was named Jazz FM's Album of the Year.

It featured the single '90 Degrees in the Shade', which although heavily influenced by the electronic sounds of the 1990s, was a representation of the band's future 'acid swing' direction. All the tracks on the album are instrumentals, with perhaps the exception of 'Obey the Rules of the Night' which featured a sampled vocal chorus and bridge.

== Track listing ==
1. Blue Mambo - 4:34
2. Ship to Paradise - 4:49
3. Unchain your Mind - 5:23
4. From Childbirth to Bingo - 5:32
5. Hawaii Five O Theme - 4:15
6. Bigfoot - 5:14
7. Bukowski and Christ - 4:17
8. 90 Degrees in the Shade - 5:14
9. Obey the Rules of the Night - 4:14
10. Oscar Bravo - 5:55
