= 1924 Lehigh Brown and White football team =

American college football season

1924 Lehigh Brown and White football
- Conference: Independent
- Record: 4–1–3
- Head coach: James A. Baldwin (3rd season)
- Home stadium: Taylor Stadium

1924 Eastern college football independents records
	Conf.			Overall
Team	W	L	T	W		L		T
No. 9 Dartmouth		–		7	–	0	–	1
No. 3 Yale		–		6	–	0	–	2
No. 8 Penn		–		9	–	1	–	1
Rutgers		–		7	–	1	–	1
Bucknell		–		8	–	2	–	0
Lafayette		–		7	–	2	–	0
Washington & Jefferson		–		7	–	2	–	0
Holy Cross		–		7	–	1	–	1
Army		–		5	–	1	–	2
Syracuse		–		8	–	2	–	1
Fordham		–		6	–	2	–	0
Lehigh		–		4	–	1	–	3
Boston College		–		6	–	3	–	0
Penn State		–		6	–	3	–	1
Princeton		–		4	–	2	–	1
Springfield		–		4	–	2	–	1
Columbia		–		5	–	3	–	1
Pittsburgh		–		5	–	3	–	1
NYU		–		4	–	3	–	1
CCNY		–		4	–	3	–	0
Brown		–		5	–	4	–	0
Carnegie Tech		–		5	–	4	–	0
Colgate		–		5	–	4	–	0
Cornell		–		4	–	4	–	0
Harvard		–		4	–	4	–	0
Tufts		–		3	–	4	–	2
Franklin & Marshall		–		3	–	5	–	1
Villanova		–		2	–	5	–	1
Drexel		–		2	–	7	–	0
Vermont		–		2	–	7	–	0
Temple		–		1	–	4	–	0
Boston University		–		1	–	5	–	0
Buffalo		–		1	–	7	–	0
Rankings from Dickinson System

The 1924 Lehigh Brown and White football team was an American football team that represented Lehigh University as an independent during the 1924 college football season. In its third and final season under head coach James A. Baldwin, the team compiled a 4–1–3 record and outscored opponents by a total of 62 to 36. Lehigh played home games at Taylor Stadium in Bethlehem, Pennsylvania.

== Schedule ==
Date	Opponent	Site	Result
October 4	Gettysburg	Taylor Stadium; Bethlehem, PA	W 12–0
October 11	at Princeton	Palmer Stadium; Princeton, NJ	T 0–0
October 18	Dickinson	Taylor Stadium; Bethlehem, PA	W 15–6
October 25	Rutgers	Taylor Stadium; Bethlehem, PA	T 13–13
November 1	Muhlenberg	Taylor Stadium; Bethlehem, PA	W 5–0
November 8	at Holy Cross	Fitton Field; Worcester, MA	T 3–3
November 15	Villanova	Tayor Stadium; Bethlehem, PA	W 14–7
November 22	at Lafayette	March Field; Easton, PA (rivalry)	L 0–7
