= 1924 Vermont Green and Gold football team =

American college football season

1924 Vermont Green and Gold football
- Conference: Independent
- Record: 2–7
- Head coach: Tom Keady (4th season)
- Home stadium: Centennial Field

1924 Eastern college football independents records
	Conf.			Overall
Team	W	L	T	W		L		T
No. 9 Dartmouth		–		7	–	0	–	1
No. 3 Yale		–		6	–	0	–	2
No. 8 Penn		–		9	–	1	–	1
Rutgers		–		7	–	1	–	1
Bucknell		–		8	–	2	–	0
Lafayette		–		7	–	2	–	0
Washington & Jefferson		–		7	–	2	–	0
Holy Cross		–		7	–	1	–	1
Army		–		5	–	1	–	2
Syracuse		–		8	–	2	–	1
Fordham		–		6	–	2	–	0
Lehigh		–		4	–	1	–	3
Boston College		–		6	–	3	–	0
Penn State		–		6	–	3	–	1
Princeton		–		4	–	2	–	1
Springfield		–		4	–	2	–	1
Columbia		–		5	–	3	–	1
Pittsburgh		–		5	–	3	–	1
NYU		–		4	–	3	–	1
CCNY		–		4	–	3	–	0
Brown		–		5	–	4	–	0
Carnegie Tech		–		5	–	4	–	0
Colgate		–		5	–	4	–	0
Cornell		–		4	–	4	–	0
Harvard		–		4	–	4	–	0
Tufts		–		3	–	4	–	2
Franklin & Marshall		–		3	–	5	–	1
Villanova		–		2	–	5	–	1
Drexel		–		2	–	7	–	0
Vermont		–		2	–	7	–	0
Temple		–		1	–	4	–	0
Boston University		–		1	–	5	–	0
Buffalo		–		1	–	7	–	0
Rankings from Dickinson System

The 1924 Vermont Green and Gold football team was an American football team that represented the University of Vermont as an independent during the 1924 college football season. In their fourth year under head coach Tom Keady, the team compiled a 2–7 record.

== Schedule ==
Date	Opponent	Site	Result	Source
October 4	Providence College	Centennial Field; Burlington, VT	W 13–3	
October 11	at Dartmouth	Memorial Field; Hanover, NH	L 0–38	
October 18	Springfield	Centennial Field; Burlington, VT	L 0–7	
October 25	at Middlebury	Porter Field; Middlebury, VT	L 0–15	
November 1	Holy Cross	Centennial Field; Burlington, VT	L 0–27	
November 8	at Navy	Thompson Stadium; Annapolis, MD	L 0–53	
November 15	Norwich	Centennial Field; Burlington, VT	W 14–0	
November 22	at Boston College	Braves Field; Boston, MA	L 7–33	
November 27	at Marquette	Marquette Stadium; Milwaukee, WI	L 7–61	
