= 1924 Holy Cross football team =

American college football season

1924 Holy Cross football
- Conference: Independent
- Record: 7–1–1
- Head coach: Cleo A. O'Donnell (6th season)
- Home stadium: Fitton Field

1924 Eastern college football independents records
	Conf.			Overall
Team	W	L	T	W		L		T
No. 9 Dartmouth		–		7	–	0	–	1
No. 3 Yale		–		6	–	0	–	2
No. 8 Penn		–		9	–	1	–	1
Rutgers		–		7	–	1	–	1
Bucknell		–		8	–	2	–	0
Lafayette		–		7	–	2	–	0
Washington & Jefferson		–		7	–	2	–	0
Holy Cross		–		7	–	1	–	1
Army		–		5	–	1	–	2
Syracuse		–		8	–	2	–	1
Fordham		–		6	–	2	–	0
Lehigh		–		4	–	1	–	3
Boston College		–		6	–	3	–	0
Penn State		–		6	–	3	–	1
Princeton		–		4	–	2	–	1
Springfield		–		4	–	2	–	1
Columbia		–		5	–	3	–	1
Pittsburgh		–		5	–	3	–	1
NYU		–		4	–	3	–	1
CCNY		–		4	–	3	–	0
Brown		–		5	–	4	–	0
Carnegie Tech		–		5	–	4	–	0
Colgate		–		5	–	4	–	0
Cornell		–		4	–	4	–	0
Harvard		–		4	–	4	–	0
Tufts		–		3	–	4	–	2
Franklin & Marshall		–		3	–	5	–	1
Villanova		–		2	–	5	–	1
Drexel		–		2	–	7	–	0
Vermont		–		2	–	7	–	0
Temple		–		1	–	4	–	0
Boston University		–		1	–	5	–	0
Buffalo		–		1	–	7	–	0
Rankings from Dickinson System

The 1924 Holy Cross football team was an American football team that represented the College of the Holy Cross as an independent during the 1924 college football season. In its sixth season under head coach Cleo A. O'Donnell, the team compiled a 7–1–1 record. The team played its home games at Fitton Field in Worcester, Massachusetts.

== Schedule ==
Date	Opponent	Site	Result	Attendance	Source
September 27	Catholic University	Fitton Field; Worcester, MA	W 13–7		
October 4	St. John's	Fitton Field; Worcester, MA	W 28–0		
October 11	Boston University	Fitton Field; Worcester, MA	W 16–7	6,000	
October 18	at Harvard	Harvard Stadium; Boston, MA	L 6–12		
October 25	Fordham	Fitton Field; Worcester, MA	W 13–0		
November 1	at Vermont	Centennial Field; Burlington, VT	W 27–0		
November 8	Lehigh	Fitton Field; Worcester, MA	T 3–3		
November 22	Canisius	Fitton Field; Worcester, MA	W 53–7		
November 29	at Boston College	Braves Field; Boston, MA	W 33–0		
