= 1924 Drexel Dragons football team =

Football team representing Drexel University

1924 Drexel Dragons football
- Conference: Independent
- Record: 2–7
- Head coach: Harry J. O'Brien (3rd season)
- Captain: Mackin

1924 Eastern college football independents records
	Conf.			Overall
Team	W	L	T	W		L		T
No. 9 Dartmouth		–		7	–	0	–	1
No. 3 Yale		–		6	–	0	–	2
No. 8 Penn		–		9	–	1	–	1
Rutgers		–		7	–	1	–	1
Bucknell		–		8	–	2	–	0
Lafayette		–		7	–	2	–	0
Washington & Jefferson		–		7	–	2	–	0
Holy Cross		–		7	–	1	–	1
Army		–		5	–	1	–	2
Syracuse		–		8	–	2	–	1
Fordham		–		6	–	2	–	0
Lehigh		–		4	–	1	–	3
Boston College		–		6	–	3	–	0
Penn State		–		6	–	3	–	1
Princeton		–		4	–	2	–	1
Springfield		–		4	–	2	–	1
Columbia		–		5	–	3	–	1
Pittsburgh		–		5	–	3	–	1
NYU		–		4	–	3	–	1
CCNY		–		4	–	3	–	0
Brown		–		5	–	4	–	0
Carnegie Tech		–		5	–	4	–	0
Colgate		–		5	–	4	–	0
Cornell		–		4	–	4	–	0
Harvard		–		4	–	4	–	0
Tufts		–		3	–	4	–	2
Franklin & Marshall		–		3	–	5	–	1
Villanova		–		2	–	5	–	1
Drexel		–		2	–	7	–	0
Vermont		–		2	–	7	–	0
Temple		–		1	–	4	–	0
Boston University		–		1	–	5	–	0
Buffalo		–		1	–	7	–	0
Rankings from Dickinson System

The 1924 Drexel Dragons football team represented Drexel Institute—now known as Drexel University—in the 1924 college football season. Led by Harry J. O'Brien in his third season as head coach, the team compiled a record of 2–7.

== Schedule ==
Date	Time	Opponent	Site	Result	Attendance	Source
October 1		at Penn	Franklin Field; Philadelphia, PA	L 0–52	10,000	
October 4		Ursinus	Philadelphia, PA	L 0–6		
October 11	2:30 pm	Saint Joseph's	Strawbridge & Clothier Field; Philadelphia, PA	L 0–13		
October 18		George Washington	Philadelphia, PA	L 0–13		
October 25	2:30 pm	at Gallaudet	Washington, DC	L 0–39		
November 1		Schuykill	Philadelphia, PA	W 16–0		
November 8		Loyola (MD)	Philadelphia, PA	W 13–6		
November 15		at Johns Hopkins	Baltimore, MD	L 0–18		
November 22		at Temple	Philadelphia, PA	L 0–6		
All times are in Eastern time

== Roster ==
1924 Drexel Dragons football team roster
Players
Coaches
Offense

Pos.	#	Name	Class
TE		Dill
OT		Mackin (C)
G		Snyder
C		Platt
G		MacQuarrie
OT		Pilkouski
TE		Powers
		Sukin
		Maher
		Ziegler
		Kapuchi
		Clark
		Hagens
		Wolfe
		Foley
		Sherlock
		Hartman
		White
		Zeigler
		Hill
		Regal
		O'Neil
		Gowan
		DeBorie
		Drum
		Murphy
		Schwartz
		Forbes
		Griffith

Defense

Pos.	#	Name	Class

Special teams

Pos.	#	Name	Class

Head coach

- Harry J. O'Brien (Swarthmore)

Coordinators/assistant coaches

Legend

- (C) Team captain
- (S) Suspended
- (I) Ineligible
- Injured
- Redshirt

Roster
Last update: February 12, 2018
