= John Wallace (footballer) =

Australian rules footballer

Personal information
- Full name: John Wallace
- Born: 1 September 1959 (age 67)
- Original team: Thornton
- Height: 188 cm (6 ft 2 in)
- Weight: 85 kg (187 lb)

Playing career^{1}
Years	Club	Games (Goals)
1979	Melbourne	2 (0)
- ^{1} Playing statistics correct to the end of 1979.

John Wallace (born 1 September 1959) is a former Australian rules footballer who played with Melbourne in the Victorian Football League (VFL).
