= Jack Wallace (second baseman) =

American baseball player

- Second baseman
- Batted: Right Threw: Right

Negro league baseball debut
- 1926, for the Bacharach Giants

Last appearance
- 1931, for the Cleveland Cubs

Teams
- Bacharach Giants (1926); Cleveland Cubs (1931)

McKinley "Jack" Wallace was an American Negro league second baseman between 1926 and 1931.

Wallace played for the Bacharach Giants in 1926, posting a .229 batting average in 17 recorded games. He also played briefly for the Cleveland Cubs in 1931.
