= John Wallace (American football coach) =

American football player and coach

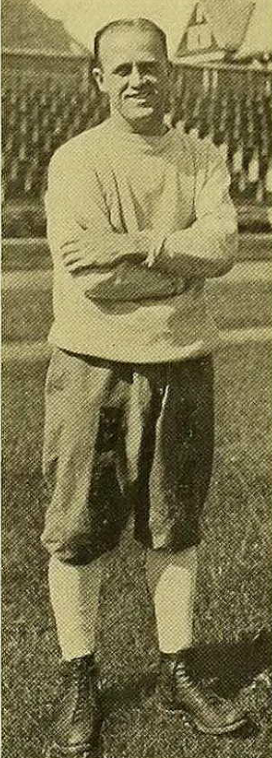
- Wallace from The 1928 Scarlet Letter

Playing career
- 1916: Rutgers
- Position: Quarterback

Coaching career (HC unless noted)
- 1919–1922: Rutherford HS (NJ)
- 1923: Rutgers (assistant)
- 1924–1926: Rutgers

Head coaching record
- Overall: 12–14–1 (college)

John H. Wallace was an American football coach. He served as the head coach at Rutgers University from 1924 to 1926.

Wallace was one of the most highly regarded high school quarterbacks in New Jersey in 1915, an All-State player at Rutherford (New Jersey) High School, where he led the team to a co-state championship his senior year.

He enrolled at Rutgers and played quarterback his freshman year. Among his teammates was singer and civil rights activist Paul Robeson.

The next year, following the US entry into World War I, Wallace enlisted in the naval reserves and was in officer training school when the war ended.

In 1919, Wallace returned to Rutherford High School to coach its football team. During his four-year tenure, the team was undefeated, compiling a 37-0-1 record and winning four Northern New Jersey League titles and two state championships — despite having a student body of approximately 125.

His accomplishments were recognized beyond the Northern New Jersey region and attracted the notice of Rutgers University. Its head coach, the venerable George Sanford, hired Wallace as an assistant in 1923. Sanford retired after that season, and Wallace was named the team’s head coach at 27 years old.

The 1920s were a golden age in college football, before the development of the pro game. Rutgers at that time was a respected regional program that competed against several top national teams. For example, In 1926, during Wallace’s tenure, Rutgers played NYU before 20,000 spectators at Yankee Stadium.

In Wallace’s first season, the team went 7–1–1. It was considered one of the top teams in the East that year, described by contemporaries as the greatest squad in Rutgers football history. Rutgers crushed nationally-ranked Lafayette and beat highly-regarded Cornell. At season’s end, Wallace and the team were feted by a bonfire celebration. After expressing uncertainty about whether he wanted to return, Wallace was offered and signed a three-year extension.

Over the next two years, however, the team's fortunes sagged.

In 1925, the team had lost eight graduating seniors, including a once-in-a-generation star, 29-year old All-American fullback Homer Hazel. Weeks before the opening game, Wallace was stricken with appendicitis and remained “unable to don a suit” for the rest of the schedule.

The results were as glum as the prior year’s were glorious. Rutgers was shut out in six of its nine games, was victorious in just two and was outscored by a total of 146-38.

In 1926, George Sanford was brought back as an assistant coach, although it was presumed that he co-ran the team with Wallace. Rutgers only marginally improved, posting a 3-6 record and was outscored 133-55.

In February, 1927, a special committee of the Rutgers University Athletic Board, consisting of Board members, faculty, alums and former football players, recommended that Wallace be replaced. He was subsequently dismissed. His overall record was 12–14–1 in three seasons

Wallace’s critics felt that in 1924 he had inherited what was still Coach Sanford’s team and had benefited from the exploits of fullback Hazel, who had also helped coach that year. The disappointments of the following two seasons, so this reasoning went, revealed Wallace’s true coaching limitations.

The decision surprised students and many alums. Wallace too was surprised — and angered. Immediately after his dismissal, he announced that he had retained a former Bergen County prosecutor to demand fulfillment of the three-year contract.

“I’ve never had a decent break at Rutgers,” Wallace said. “I had a green team last year, and this year would have been my first opportunity to show what I could do. I deserve a chance and am determined to have it.”

Such a direct and public challenge to an institution’s reputation and authority was unusual in the sports world of the day, and it is likely that the dispute was settled behind closed doors.

Wallace never returned to coaching, except for a brief stint as head coach, in 1941, of the New York Yankees football team that played in the short-lived American Association, a rival league to the NFL.

A passionate golfer, Wallace served as president in 1958 and 1959 of the Metropolitan Golf Association, one of the premier organizations supporting amateur golf in the United States.

In 1934, he unsuccessfully sought the Democratic nomination to the New Jersey General Assembly.

== Head coaching record ==
=== College ===
Year	Team	Overall	Conference	Standing	Bowl/playoffs
Rutgers Queensmen (Independent) (1924–1926)
1924	Rutgers	7–1–1			
1925	Rutgers	2–7			
1926	Rutgers	3–6			
Rutgers:		12–14–1			
Total:		12–14–1			
