= Heavyshift =

Heavyshift (sometimes Heavy Shift) is a British acid jazz trio composed of William South (piano) and John Wallace (saxophone), who first met and started gigging together around 1994. They have so far released four albums (The Cocktail Years not officially representing Heavy Shift but rather Wallace/South). Their debut album, Unchain Your Mind, featured the hit single "90 Degrees in the Shade" and went to the Top Five on the new adult contemporary charts and Billboard jazz charts being named "Album of the Year" by Jazz FM.

== Discography ==
- Unchain Your Mind (1995)
- The Last Picture Show (1996)
- The Cocktail Years (Wallace & South)
- The Conversation (2004 - US)
- Say Hello to Teddy (2003)
- "Hampster on the Wheel" (2009)
