= 1924 Pittsburgh Panthers football team =

American college football season

1924 Pittsburgh Panthers football
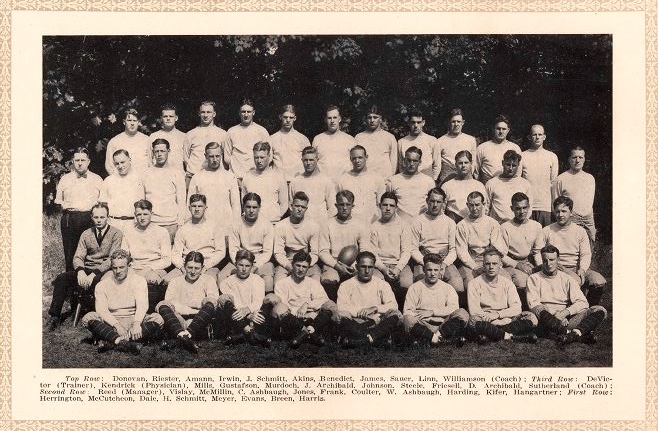
- Conference: Independent
- Record: 5–3–1
- Head coach: Jock Sutherland (1st season)
- Offensive scheme: Single-wing
- Captain: Noble Lee Frank
- Home stadium: Forbes Field

1924 Eastern college football independents records
	Conf.			Overall
Team	W	L	T	W		L		T
No. 9 Dartmouth		–		7	–	0	–	1
No. 3 Yale		–		6	–	0	–	2
No. 8 Penn		–		9	–	1	–	1
Rutgers		–		7	–	1	–	1
Bucknell		–		8	–	2	–	0
Lafayette		–		7	–	2	–	0
Washington & Jefferson		–		7	–	2	–	0
Holy Cross		–		7	–	1	–	1
Army		–		5	–	1	–	2
Syracuse		–		8	–	2	–	1
Fordham		–		6	–	2	–	0
Lehigh		–		4	–	1	–	3
Boston College		–		6	–	3	–	0
Penn State		–		6	–	3	–	1
Princeton		–		4	–	2	–	1
Springfield		–		4	–	2	–	1
Columbia		–		5	–	3	–	1
Pittsburgh		–		5	–	3	–	1
NYU		–		4	–	3	–	1
CCNY		–		4	–	3	–	0
Brown		–		5	–	4	–	0
Carnegie Tech		–		5	–	4	–	0
Colgate		–		5	–	4	–	0
Cornell		–		4	–	4	–	0
Harvard		–		4	–	4	–	0
Tufts		–		3	–	4	–	2
Franklin & Marshall		–		3	–	5	–	1
Villanova		–		2	–	5	–	1
Drexel		–		2	–	7	–	0
Vermont		–		2	–	7	–	0
Temple		–		1	–	4	–	0
Boston University		–		1	–	5	–	0
Buffalo		–		1	–	7	–	0
Rankings from Dickinson System

The 1924 Pittsburgh Panthers football team was an American football team that represented the University of Pittsburgh as an independent during the 1924 college football season. In their 20th season, and first under head coach Jock Sutherland, the team compiled a 5–3–1 record and outscored opponents by a total of 98–43. The team played its home games at Forbes Field in Pittsburgh.

== Schedule ==
Date	Opponent	Site	Result	Attendance	Source
September 27	at Grove City	Robert E. Thorn Field; Grove City, PA	W 14–0		
October 4	Lafayette	Forbes Field; Pittsburgh, PA	L 0–10	15,000	
October 11	West Virginia	Forbes Field; Pittsburgh, PA (rivalry)	W 14–7	25,000	
October 18	at Johns Hopkins	Baltimore, MD	W 26–0	10,000	
October 25	Carnegie Tech	Forbes Field; Pittsburgh, PA	L 0–6	25,000	
November 1	at Syracuse	Archbold Stadium; Syracuse, NY	T 7–7	20,000	
November 8	Geneva	Forbes Field; Pittsburgh, PA	W 13–0	4,000	
November 15	Washington & Jefferson	Forbes Field; Pittsburgh, PA	L 0–10	35,000	
November 27	Penn State	Forbes Field; Pittsburgh, PA (rivalry)	W 24–3	33,000	

== Preseason ==
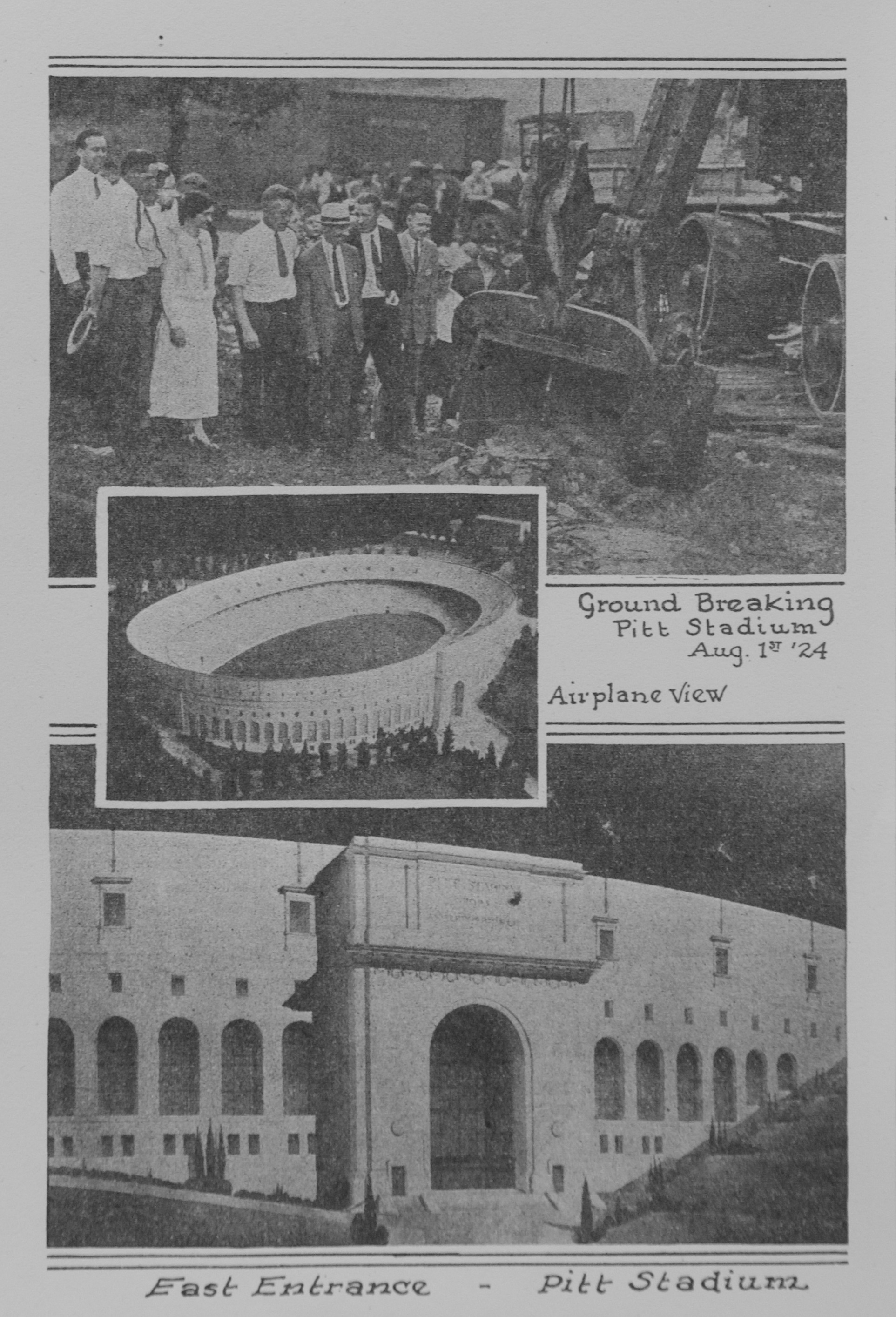
Future Pitt Stadium

At the close of the 1923 season the University of Pittsburgh bid farewell to Glenn S. Warner, who was now head coach of Leland Stanford University, and welcomed John Bain Sutherland, who had been the Lafayette head coach, to lead the football program. "It is very difficult for a new coach to replace a legend." But "Jock" with his 33-8-2 record for five years work at Lafayette as incentive came home to Pittsburgh to take on the challenge. His first order of business was hiring Guy Williamson, former Pitt quarterback and recent head football coach of Grove City College, as his assistant. Alex Stevenson and Floyd Rose both remained on the staff.

Graduate Manager Karl E. Davis set up another competitive schedule. TheUniversity of Pennsylvania coaches demanded an easier schedule, so they dropped Pitt from their schedule. The Panthers instead played Johns Hopkins University at Baltimore Stadium and Geneva replaced Bucknell. The rest of the schedule mimicked the 1923 slate. Penn was back on the schedule for the 1925 season.

Coach Sutherland implemented a spring practice session to become acquainted with the returning members of the squad. The new coach had work to do as only five starters from the 1923 Penn State game lineup were eligible for the 1924 season. (Chase, Johnson, Wissinger, Gwosden and Gustafson) After four weeks of strenuous drill, Coach Sutherland stated that he was highly pleased with the condition of the many candidates. "Not only the system of Sutherland has been learned, but general conditioning of the men, new signals, and general instructions have been practiced. The three teams which practiced on the field during this time learned new plays which will be utilized next fall. The players have also had considerable practice in handling the oval, punting and passing."

Approximately one year after the initial request, the University and city officials agreed to the conditions of street vacating and construction for the new 70,000 seat stadium. Excavation began August 4, 1924 and the hope was to play the 1925 season in the new structure. W. S. Hindman, class of 1898, was the designing engineer in charge of construction. The stadium facilities were also to be utilized by the baseball, track and basketball teams. "A special basketball pavilion with a seating capacity of 5,000 will be made under the stadium at the right of the main entrance."

Sutherland's first Camp Hamilton preseason practice ran from September 3 to the September 20 with more than 40 aspirants vying for positions on the squad. Coach Sutherland, assisted by Guy Williamson and Floyd Rose, had about three weeks to prepare the lads for their first game at Grove City on September 27. On the eve of the end of camp, Harry Camins of The Gazette Times reported: "Coach Sutherland professes to be entirely satisfied with the results attained during the stay here. He says there remains much to be done, but that the results thus far have been all that could be expected of a team which has to be largely rebuilt."

== Coaching staff ==
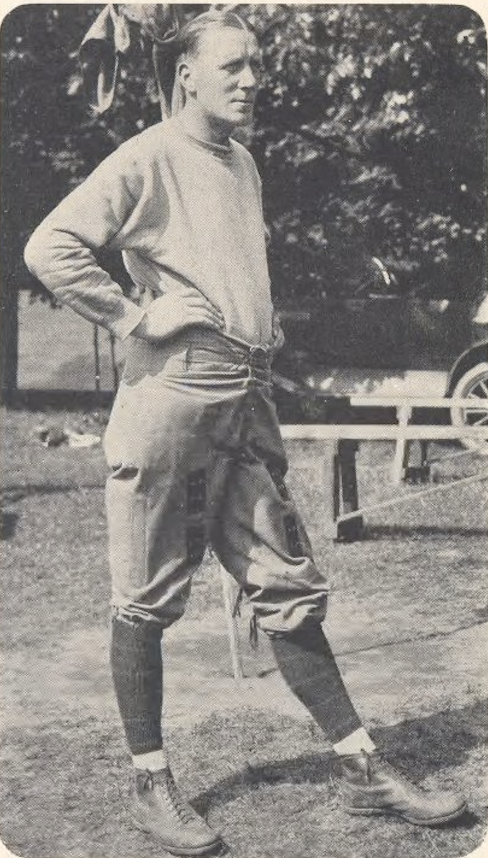
Coach "Jock" Sutherland

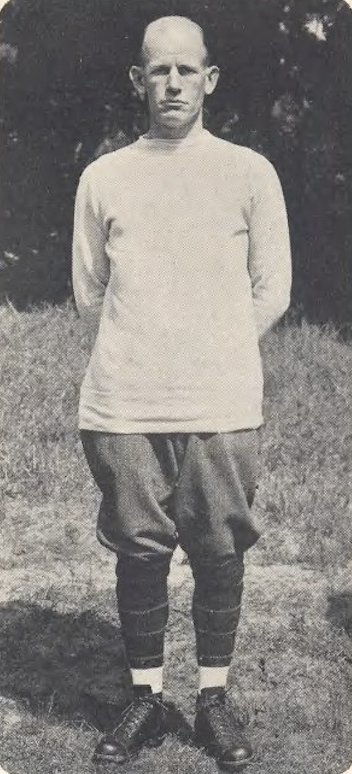
Coach Williamson

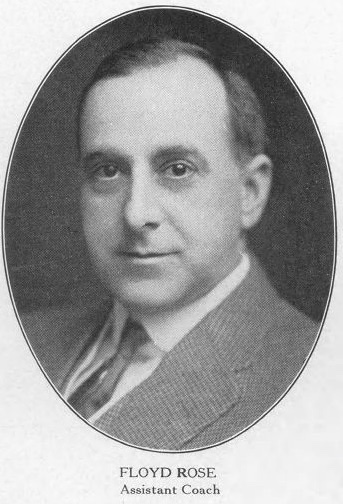
Floyd Rose

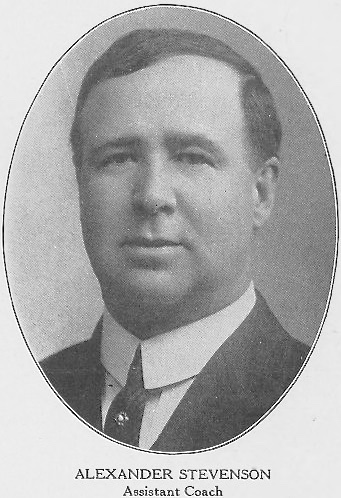
Alexander Stevenson

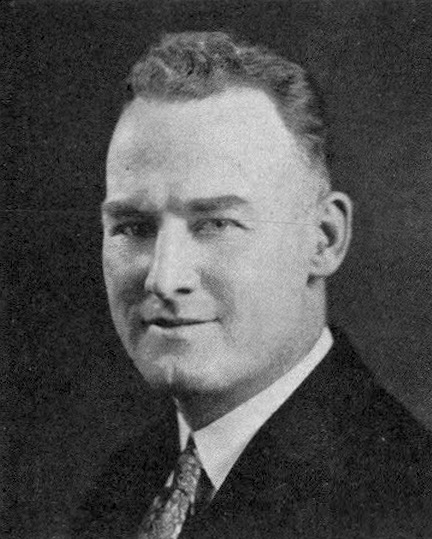
H. Clifford Carlson

1924 Pittsburgh Panthers football staff
Coaching staff: John B. "Jock" Sutherland – Head coach; Guy "Chalky" Williamson – Assistant coach; Floyd Rose – Assistant coach; Alexander Stevenson – Assistant coach; H. Clifford Carlson - freshman coach	Support staff: Harry Reed– student football manager; Ollie DeVictor – team trainer; Karl E. Davis – graduate manager of athletics; George I. Carson – assistant graduate manager

== Roster ==
1924 Pittsburgh Panthers football roster
Player	Position	Games	Height	Weight	Age	Class	Prep School
Noble L. Frank*	captain/tackle	8	6' 1"	181	23	1925	Harrisburg Central H. S.
Harold Akins*	tackle	7	5' 11"	187	23	1925	Bellefonte Academy
Alfred Amann*	quarterback	4	5' 9"	171	21	1927	Bellefonte Academy
David Archibald	end	0	6'	192	21	1927	Westinghouse H. S.
J. A. Archibald	guard	1	6' 1"	165	21	1927	Bellefonte Academy
Clarence Ashbaugh	center	0	5' 10"	166	21	1927	Washington H. S.
William Ashbaugh*	quarterback	9	5' 10"	179	23	1925	Bellefonte Academy
Frank J. Benedict	center	4	6'	175	19	1926	Midland H. S.
James N. Breen	center	0	5' 10"	155	21	1925	New Brighton H. S.
Jesse J. Brown*	halfback	7	5' 11"	175	21	1926	Nichols Prep (Buffalo, NY)
Ralph Chase*	tackle	8	6' 4"	199	21	1926	Wyoming Seminary
Wallace Coulter	fullback	0	5' 11"	170	20	1927	Crafton H. S.
Roland Dale	quarterback	0	5' 10"	156	22	1926	Westinghouse H. S.
F. C. Donovan	guard	0	5' 10"	183	19	1926	St. Francis Prep
John W. Evans	quarterback	3	5' 8"	154	23	1925	Duquesne H. S.
Charles Freisell	guard	0	5' 11"	184	20	1926	Aspinwall H. S.
Andrew C. Gustafson*	fullback	8	6'	191	21	1926	West Aurora H. S. (Aurora, IL)
Milo Gwosden*	end	9	5' 11"	175	23	1926	Indiana Normal
Ulhardt Hangartner*	guard	8	5' 11"	195	22	1925	Schenley H. S.
John J. Harding*	halfback	8	5' 9"	155	22	1926	Wyoming Seminary
Oliver Harris*	halfback	7	5' 11"	166	21	1927	New Brighton H. S.
Lee Herrington	halfback	0	5' 8"	152	20	1927	Uniontown H. S.
J. A. Hodges	halfback	0	5' 11"	165	23	1925	Central H. S. (Cleveland, OH)
Robert Irwin*	halfback	5	5' 11"	159	22	1926	Bellefonte H. S.
Clyde Jack	end	1	5' 10"	171	22	1927	The Kiski School
William James	halfback	0	5' 11"	150	22	1926	Schenley H. S.
Marsh Johnson*	fullback	9	6' 2"	181	22	1925	Bellefonte Academy
Ben Jones	quarterback	0	5' 10"	163	20	1926	Schenley H. S.
John J. Kifer*	end	8	5' 11"	163	21	1926	Norwin H. S.
Howard Linn*	guard	6	5' 11"	214	21	1927	Bellefonte Academy
Carl McCutcheon*	halfback	4	5' 9"	151	22	1926	East Liverpool H. S.
Blair V. McMillin*	end	5	5' 11"	167	18	1927	Wilkinsburg H. S.
Michael Meyer	end	1	5' 7"	160	23	1926	Union H. S. (Knoxville, TN)
James Mills	fullback	0	6' 2"	157	20	1927	California H. S.
Thomas Murdoch*	guard	7	6'	181	23	1925	Schenley H. S.
Herman Riester	guard	1	5' 11"	189	18	1927	Westinghouse H. S.
Carl Sauer*	end	9	5' 11"	170	22	1925	West Central H. S. (Cleveland, OH)
Joseph Schmitt*	halfback	5	5' 11''	154	21	1927	The Kiski School
Henry Schmitt	halfback	1	5' 7"	131	22	1927	Donora H. S.
John B. Shumaker	tackle	0	5' 11"	175	20	1926	Rochester H. S.
Floyd Snyder	quarterback	3	5' 8"	175	21	1927	Wilkinsburg H. S.
Wendell Steele*	guard	8	6' 2"	184	21	1926	South Hills H. S.
Alex Vislay	end	0	5' 11"	151	22	1927	Indiana Normal
Theodore Wilson	end	0	5'11"	170	20	1927	Wilkinsburg H. S.
Zoner A. Wissinger*	tackle	8	6'	195	21	1926	Greenville H. S.
Harry M. Reed*	manager					1925	New Brighton H. S.
* Letterman

== Game summaries ==
=== At Grove City ===
Week 1: Pitt at Grove City

Team	1	2	3	4	Total
• Pitt	7	7	0	0	14
Grove City	0	0	0	0	0

- Date: September 27, 1924
- Location: Robert E. Thorn Field
  Grove City, PA
- Game start: 3:30 p.m.
- Referee: Ed Thorpe (De LaSalle)

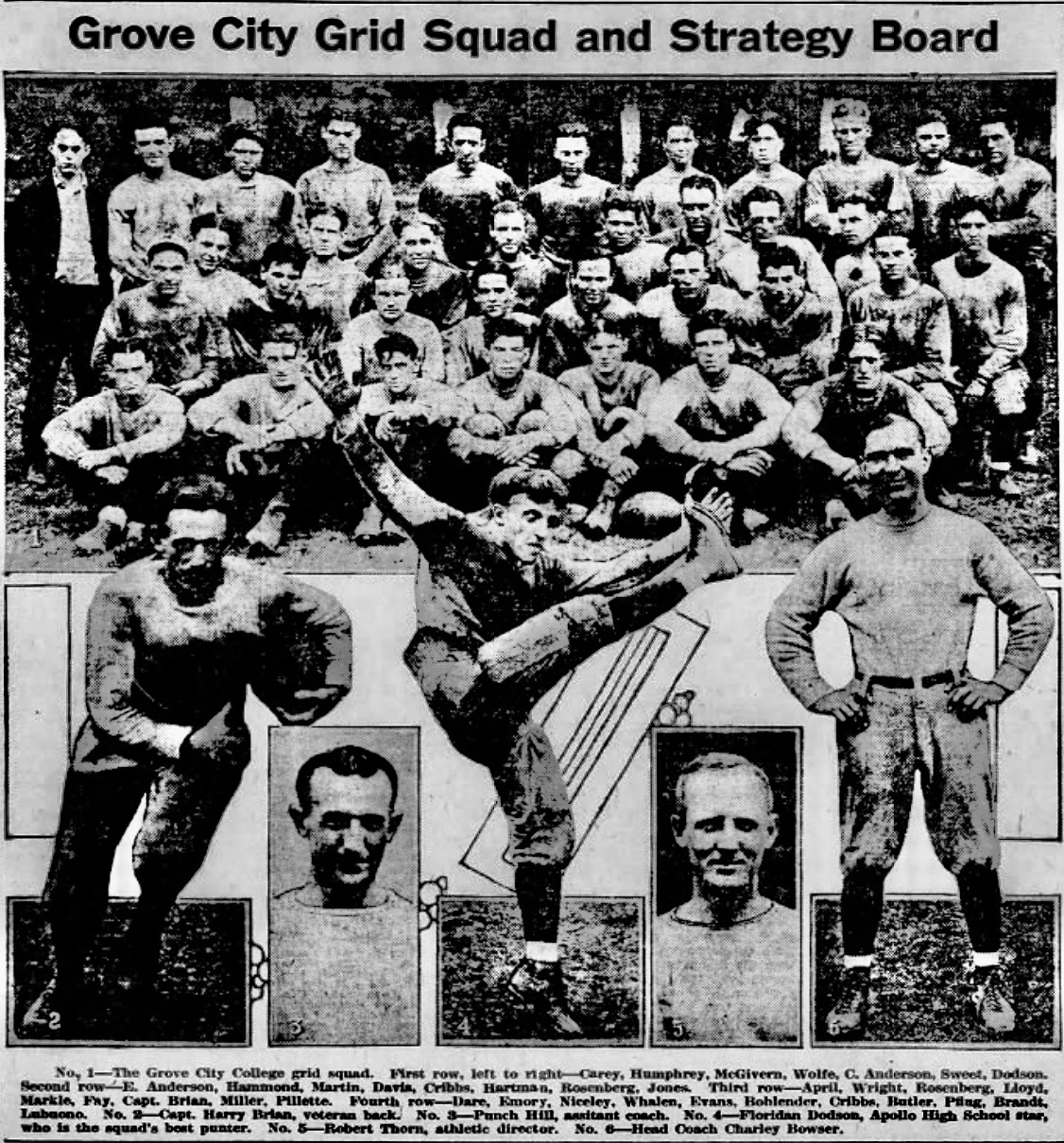
1924 Grove City Team

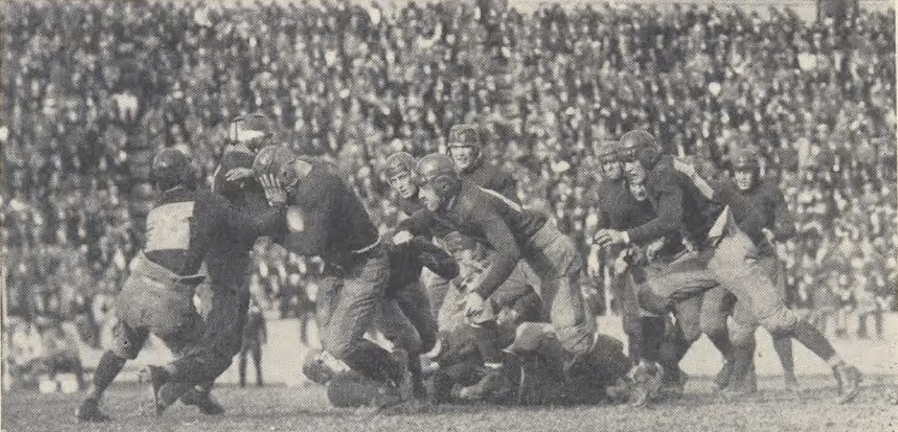
In the trenches

The Panthers opened the 1924 season on the road against the Grove City Crimson coached by former Pitt star Charley Bowser. Bowser was elevated to head coach when former head man Guy Williamson retired. (Subsequently, Coach Sutherland convinced Williamson to join the Pitt staff) Grove City won the first two games played against Pitt, in 1896 and 1898, but weren't able to beat the Panthers in the next seven meetings. "The whole district is wrought up over the contest, and a record-breaking crowd of fans is anticipated. The Grovers are in good shape. The team is just as heavy as Pitt, and probably further advanced in development. Indications point to a stubborn battle all the way with nothing to indicate a lopsided score."

On Friday afternoon, the Panthers traveling squad boarded the train for the ride to Grove City, which included a dinner stop at the Nixon Hotel in Butler. "Coach Jock Sutherland has decided to take 30 members of his squad on the trip, and all the boys are "r'arin'"to go." The Pitt fans are anxious to see how the lineup with six new men "will act in a tight place."

Max E. Hannum of The Pittsburgh Press reported: "The new Pitt football machine, under the direction of its first alumni coach, Dr. John Bain Sutherland, got off to a good start here this afternoon, defeating the Grove City collegians, coached by Charley Bowser, another former Panther, by a score of 14 to 0."

Pitt scored in the first period on a 56-yard run by John Harding. "The little halfback careened through the middle of the line. His way was well paved down the field by Mad Marsh Johnson, who cut down two would-be tacklers who were striving manfully to force Jack to the sideline. Milo Gwosden converted the try-for-point into an 'ace' with a placement kick." Pitt led 7–0. Late in the same period Pitt gained possession at midfield and advanced the ball to the 2-yard line as time expired. On the second play after switching ends of the field, Andy Gustafson bulled into the end zone for the last touchdown of the day. Gwosden again made the point after and Pitt was ahead 14–0. A few minutes later Gwosden missed an 18-yard field goal. Harding also muffed one late in the fourth quarter. Grove City never threatened Pitt's goal, but they missed two field goal attempts.

The Panthers earned 13 first downs to the Grovers 6, but the telling statistic was Grove City only completing 4 passes out of 23 attempts. "Sloppy handling of the ball by receivers and throwers disgusted the fans, while Captain Harry Brian, halfback, failed at tossing and then muffed three successive passes which would have meant heavy gains."

Grove City finished the season with a 3-5-1 record in Coach Bowser's first year.

The Pitt lineup for the game against Grove City was Blair McMillin (left end), Zoner Wissinger (left tackle), Ulhardt Hangartner (left guard), Marsh Johnson (center), Noble Frank (right guard), Thomas Murdoch (right tackle), Milo Gwosden (right end), Alfred Amann (quarterback), John Harding (left halfback), Jesse Brown (right halfback) and Andy Gustafson (fullback). Substitutes appearing in the game for Pitt were Howard Linn, Ralph Chase, William Ashbaugh, John Kifer, Robert Irwin, Harold Akins and Carl Sauer. The game was played in 15-minute quarters.

=== Lafayette ===
Week 2: Lafayette at Pitt

Team	1	2	3	4	Total
• Lafayette	0	3	0	7	10
Pitt	0	0	0	0	0

- Date: October 4, 1924
- Location: Forbes Field
  Pittsburgh, PA
- Game start: 3:00 p.m.
- Game attendance: 15,000
- Referee: Al Sharpe (Yale)

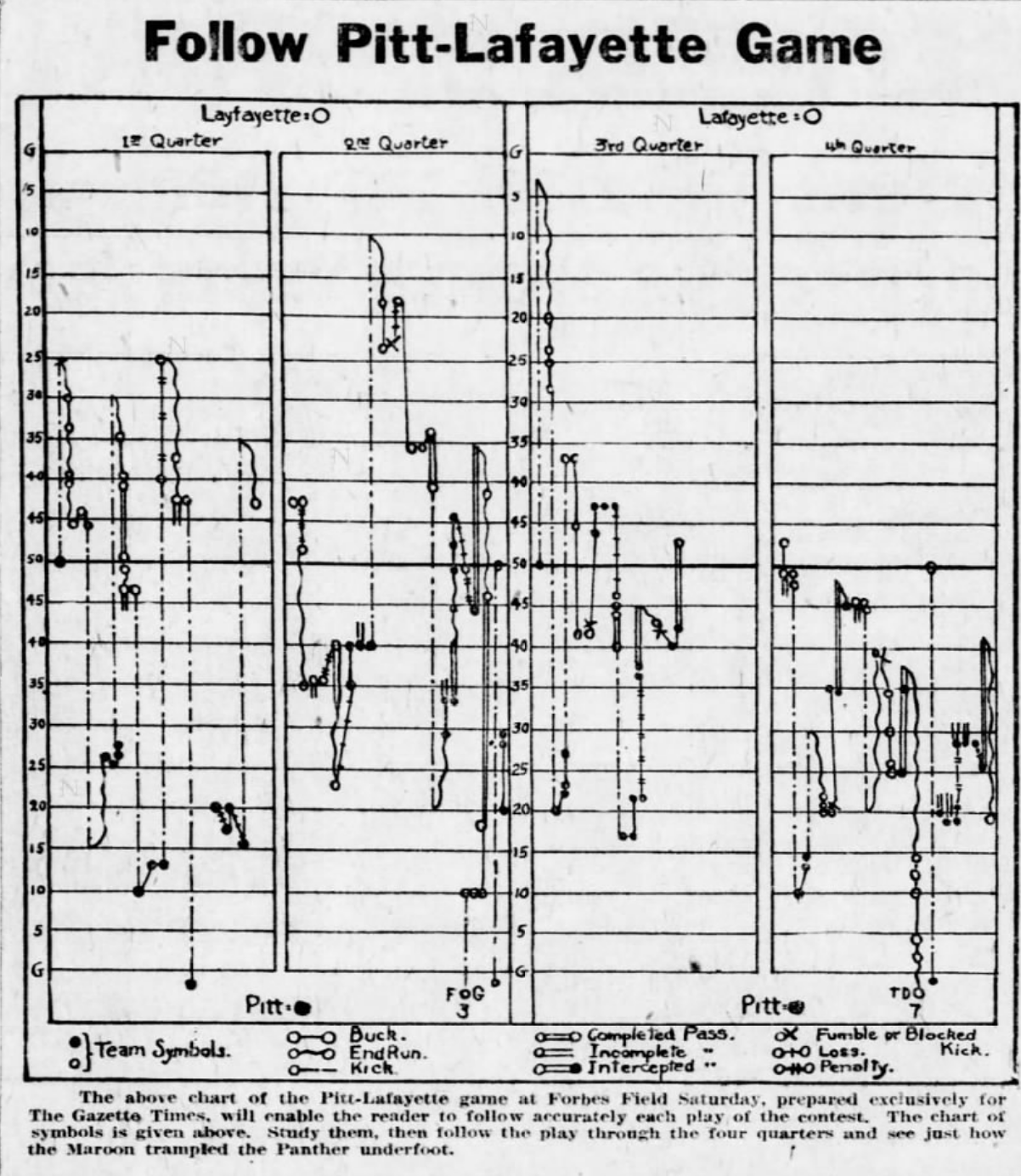
Play - By - Play Chart

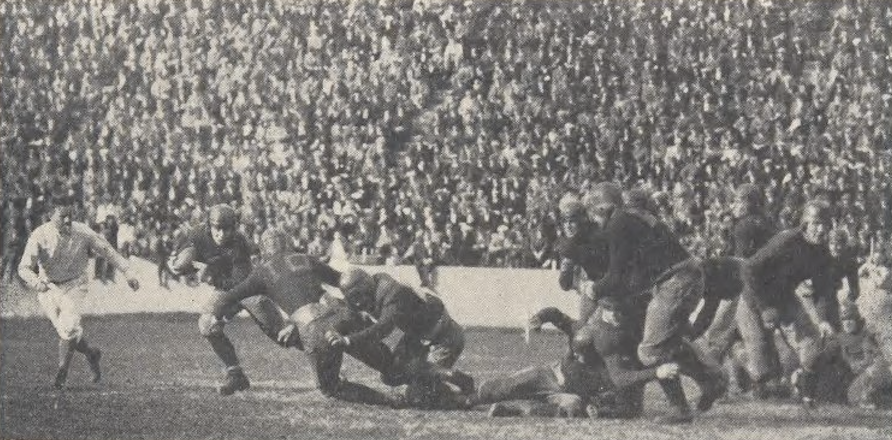
Around the end

The home opener for the third year in a row was against intrastate rival Lafayette. Coach Sutherland's previous charges were now coached by former Pitt running back Herb McCracken. The Leopards with nine returning starters in the lineup beat Muhlenberg in their opening game. Lafayette's line was anchored by All-America end Charlie Berry. "The entire 1923 backfield is back at Easton, including the famous Chicknoski, whom Jock Sutherland ranks as one of the best halfbacks he ever saw....Lafayette will present at Forbes Field a team which will have the advantage over Pitt in the matter of experience."

"The Pitt mentor fears Lafayette. Coach Sutherland realizes that if his pupils are not up to snuff (they) will find themselves on the short end. The Panther punch is still missing." A few Pitt players nursing minor injuries should all be fit to play on Saturday.

Max E. Hannum of The Pittsburgh Press reported: "Herb McCracken returned to Forbes Field in a new role yesterday. He chaperoned a well-drilled and powerful Lafayette football team, and humbled his Blue and Gold alma mater by the score of 10 to 0, while thousands of gridiron-hungry Pittsburghers looked on."

After a scoreless first period, Lafayette advanced the ball to the Pitt 10-yard line minutes before halftime and the Pitt defense stiffened. "Berry fell back to the 24-yard line for an attempted drop kick. It was good, sailing squarely between the uprights." Lafayette led 3-0 at the intermission.

The third quarter was scoreless but in the mid-fourth period Lafayette halfback Kirkleski intercepted Jesse Brown's pass on his 45-yard line and was finally brought down on the Pitt 14-yard line. Six plays later, "the Pitt line was massed for a smash at center but the Lafayette field general crossed them up and pulled a reverse that sent Kirkleski across the goal line in the corner of the field. Berry kicked the try for point from placement." Lafayette won the game 10–0. They finished the season with a 7-2 record.

The Pitt lineup for the game against Lafayette was Blair McMillin (left end), Zoner Wissinger (left tackle), Wendell Steele (left guard), Marsh Johnson (center), Ulhardt Hangartner (right guard), Thomas Murdoch (right tackle), Milo Gwosden (right end), William Ashbaugh (quarterback), John Harding (left halfback), Jesse Brown (right halfback) and Andy Gustafson (fullback). Substitutes appearing in the game for Pitt were John Kifer, Ralph Chase, Alfred Amann, Carl Sauer, Robert Irwin, Noble Frank, Howard Linn, Oliver Harris, Frank Benedict and Harold Akins. The game was played in 15-minute quarters.

=== West Virginia ===
Week 3: West Virginia at Pitt

Team	1	2	3	4	Total
West Virginia	0	0	0	7	7
• Pitt	0	0	7	7	14

- Date: October 11, 1924
- Location: Forbes Field
  Pittsburgh, PA
- Game start: 3:00 p.m.
- Game attendance: 25,000
- Referee: W. G. Crowell (Swarthmore)

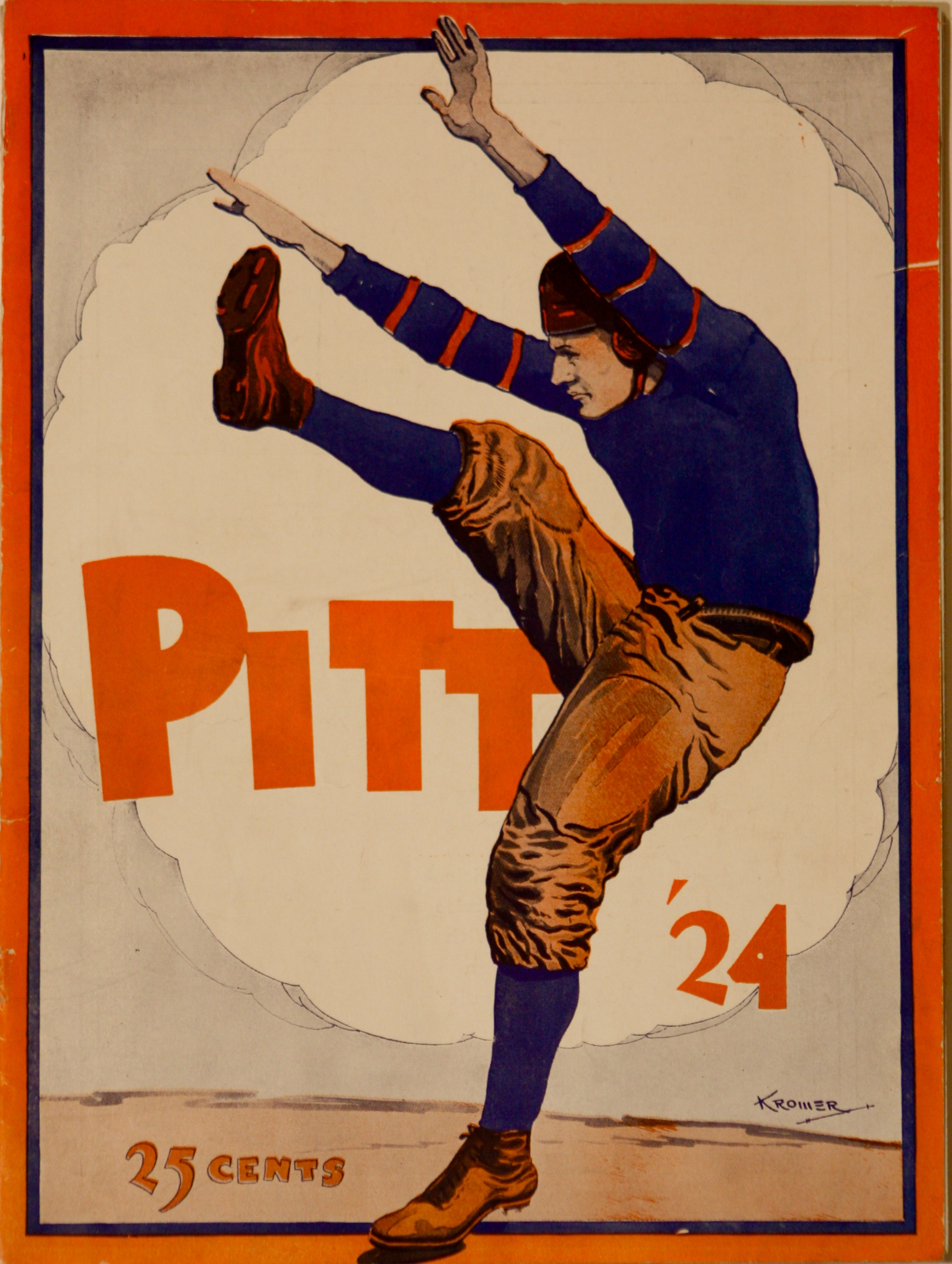
Game Day Program

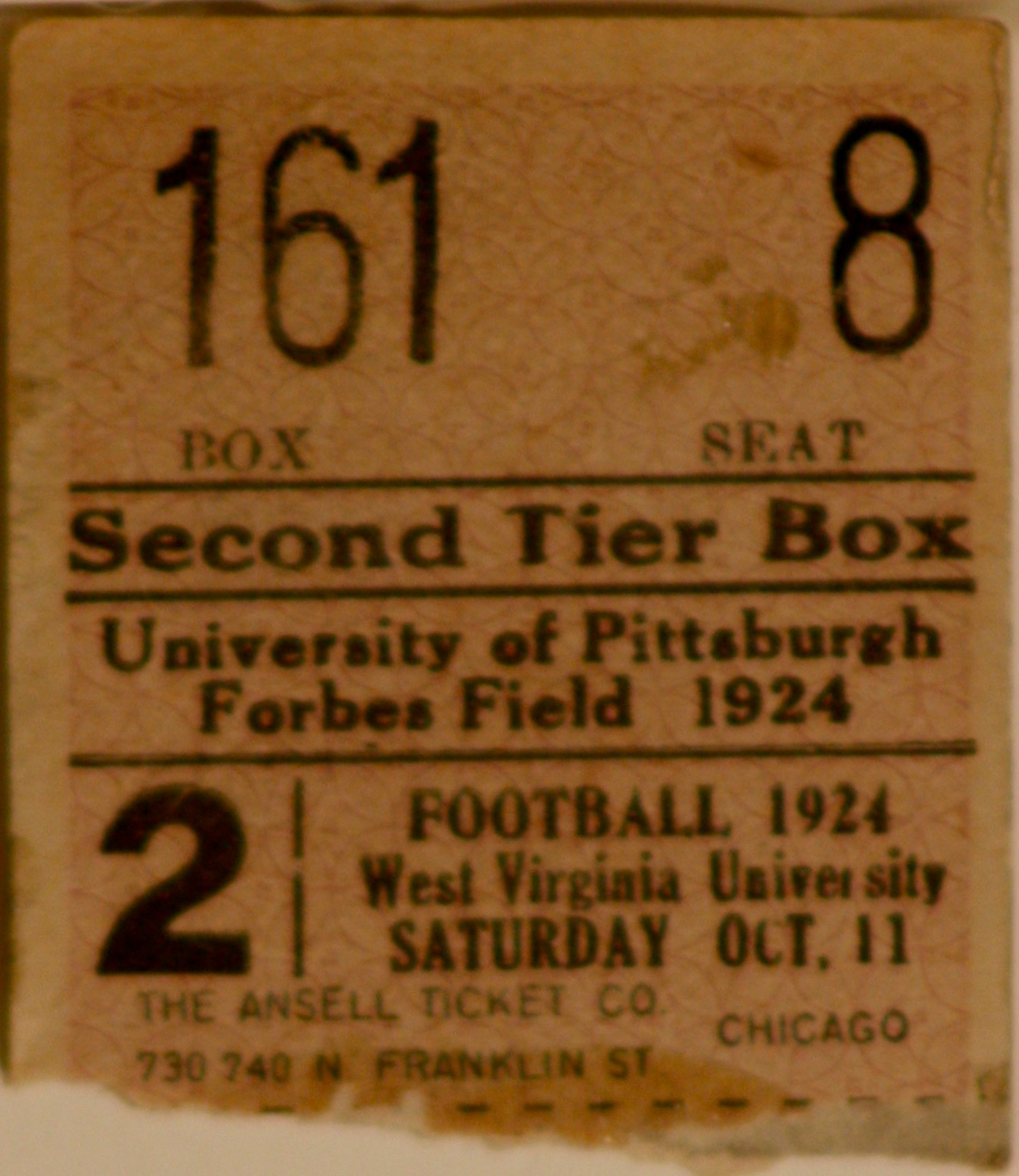
Ticket stub

Clarence Spears brought his West Virginia Mountaineers to Forbes Field for the third game of the season. The Mountaineers were looking to extend their two game winning streak over the Panthers. The Mountaineers were 2-0 on the season with victories over West Virginia Wesleyan and Allegheny. The Mountaineers lineup was missing some of the key players from the 1923 season but their line was anchored by two All-Americans – Walter Camp's third team guard, Walter Mahan and Tom Thorp's first team end, Fred Graham. Nick Nardacci, their flashy halfback, who was supposed to be sick and unable to play, was back at his position. "Last year he practically defeated the Gold and Blue single- handedly."

On Friday, Graduate Manager Karl E. Davis told The Pittsburgh Press: "Our team is in poor shape, and we will not be able to present our full strength against the Mountaineers tomorrow. This is not spoken in an attempt to alibi for whatever may happen, but merely to let the public know what Coach Sutherland is up against at present. We will have no alibis if we are beaten. We do not believe in them." Pitt starting halfback and punter, Jesse Brown, has a left shoulder injury and will not play. "Andy Gustafson, the husky fullback, is also in poor shape."

According to Regis M. Welsh of The Pittsburgh Sunday Post: "No team has ever beaten Pitt three successive times. And that still stands. For yesterday, by a transformation as though the product of magic, the Panther, humbled last week by Lafayette, regarded as in for a long season, came back, twice flung back the long, lean Mountaineers after they had reached the Pitt one-yard line and then, by a brilliant offensive which smacked of old days, scored two touchdowns and triumphed when few had expected them. 14-7."

The first period was a scoreless punting duel. Early in the second quarter Pitt defensive back John Harding was guilty of pass interference in the end zone and the Mountaineers had the ball on the Pitt 3-yard line. West Virginia fullback "Eckberg was given the ball and plunged over the line, but as he fell sprawling, the ball loosed from his arms and Joe Schmitt fell on the ball. Pitt ball on the 20-yard line." The Pitt offense advanced the ball to the West Virginia 6-yard line but lost the ball on downs. Fumbles and interceptions stymied both offenses the rest of the scoreless first half.

After intermission, Mountaineer punter, Oliker, punted out of bounds on the West Virginia 27-yard line. "On the next play the Panther forwards tore a wide hole at right guard and (Oliver) Harris crawled through and raced for a touchdown. The stands went wild." Milo Gwosden added the extra point and Pitt led 7 to 0. The Panthers missed a 20-yard field goal on their next possession. The last quarter began with West Virginia stopping the Panther offense on fourth down on the Panther 39-yard line. The Mountaineers advanced the ball by forward passes to the 7-yard line. Eckberg gained two yards on first down. On second down Nardacci plunged to the two and fumbled. Pitt back John Harding fell on the ball on the one-yard line. "Nardacci's old weakness of fumbling within the scoring zone cost the Mountaineers a touchdown." Pitt punted and West Virginia regained possession on the Pitt 25-yard line. On third down Ulard Hangartner intercepted a Nardacci pass and rambled to the West Virginia 13-yard line. "He should have crossed the line but Nardacci stopped him in spite of a four-man interference. Schmitt negotiated the rest of the distance on a wide sweep around West Virginia's right end." Gwosden converted the placement and Pitt led 14 to 0. Pitt center, Marsh Johnson, and Mountaineer end, Graham, were banished from the game for fighting. On West Virginia's next possession their offense advanced the ball to the Pitt 10-yard line. On first down "Nardacci went off left tackle, reversed his field and scored a touchdown." He added the extra point and the final score read 14 to 7 in favor of Pitt. West Virginia finished the season with an 8-1 record.

The Pitt lineup for the game against West Virginia was Blair McMillin (left end), Zoner Wissinger (left tackle), Ulhardt Hangartner (left guard), Marsh Johnson (center), Noble Frank (right guard), Thomas Murdoch (right tackle), John Kifer (right end), William Ashbaugh (quarterback), John Harding (left halfback), Joeseph Schmitt (right halfback) and Oliver Harris (fullback). Substitutes appearing in the game for Pitt were Ralph Chase, Alfred Amann, J. W. Evans, Milo Gwosden, Carl Sauer, Frank Benedict, Andy Gustafson, Wendell Steele, Harold Akins and Robert Irwin. The game was played in 15-minute quarters.

=== At Johns Hopkins ===
Week 4: Pitt at Johns Hopkins

Team	1	2	3	4	Total
• Pitt	0	6	7	13	26
Johns Hopkins	0	0	0	0	0

- Date: October 18, 1924
- Location: Municipal Stadium
  Baltimore, MD
- Game start: 3:00 p.m.
- Game attendance: 10,000
- Referee: Cosgrove (Cornell)

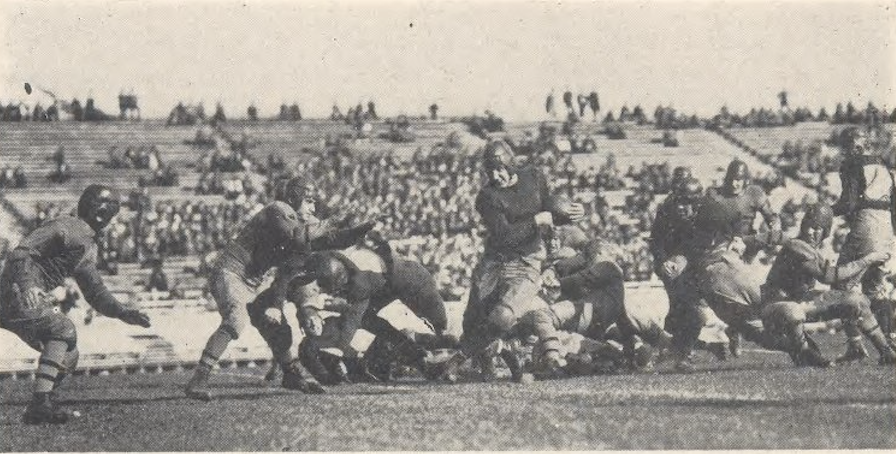
Game Day Action

The Pitt Panthers next traveled to Baltimore, MD to take on the Johns Hopkins Blue Jays for the first ever meeting between the schools. The Blue Jays were led by fifth-year coach Ray Van Orman, who played for Glenn Warner at Cornell from 1904 to 1906. Johns Hopkins was 2-0 on the season, having beaten Randolph-Macon and Mt. St. Mary's without giving up a point. The Blue Jays offense centers on Doug Turnbull, right halfback, "who is an artful runner, a kicker of more than average skill and an excellent passer."

"The style of play of the Smoky City invaders will be representative of the Sutherland-Warner-Pittsburgh era, while Hopkins' methods will stand for the Van Orman-Warner-Cornell age. Each, of course, will be a variation of the gridiron philosophy of the 'Old Master,' colored and reconstructed in spots to conform to the individual likes and dislikes of the pupils."

Coach Sutherland hoped to start the same lineup that appeared in the West Virginia game but Carl Sauer replaced an injured Blair McMillan at end and Ralph Chase was inserted into Thomas Murdoch's tackle slot.

W. Wilson Wingate of The Baltimore Sun reported: "Lost in the maze of seats at Baltimore's big horseshoe, a little crowd of some 8,000-10,000 persons-mostly silent and unassertive-saw Johns Hopkins go down to defeat before the Pittsburgh Panthers yesterday afternoon at the stadium. The score was 26 to 0."

The first quarter was scoreless. In the second period Pitt advanced the ball to the Hopkins 4-yard line. "(Joseph) Schmitt tore through right guard for the touchdown." Milo Gwosden's extra point attempt hit the cross-bar and Pitt led 6 to 0 at halftime. In the third quarter "Schmitt slipped around left end on a double pass from (Andy) Gustafson and raced 18 yards for the second touchdown." Bill Ashbaugh converted the extra point. Score: Pitt 13, Hopkins 0. The Panthers scored twice in the fourth quarter. Pitt advanced the ball to the Blue Jays 8-yard line. Gustafson carried the ball three straight downs and scored from three yards out. Gwosden blew the extra point. Pitt led 19 to 0. Late in the quarter, Carl McCutcheon went over from the five and Gwosden converted the point after. Final tally: Pitt 26, Hopkins 0.

Johns Hopkins finished the season with a 5-1-2 record.

The Pitt lineup for the game against Johns Hopkins was Carl Sauer (left end), Zoner Wissinger (left tackle), Noble Frank (left guard), Marsh Johnson (center), Ulhardt Hangartner (right guard), Ralph Chase (right tackle), John Kifer (right end), William Ashbaugh (quarterback), Joseph Schmitt (left halfback), John Harding (right halfback) and Oliver Harris (fullback). Substitutes appearing in the game for Pitt were Milo Gwosden, Harold Akins, Wendell Steele, Frank Benedict, Howard Linn, Thomas Murdoch, Alfred Amann, Robert Irwin, Carl McCutcheon, Andy Gustafson and Floyd Snyder. The game was played in 15-minute quarters.

=== Carnegie Tech ===
Week 5: Carnegie Tech at Pitt

Team	1	2	3	4	Total
• Carnegie Tech	6	0	0	0	6
Pitt	0	0	0	0	0

- Date: October 25, 1924
- Location: Forbes Field
  Pittsburgh, PA
- Game start: 3:00 p.m.
- Game attendance: 25,000
- Referee: Edward Thorp (De LaSalle)

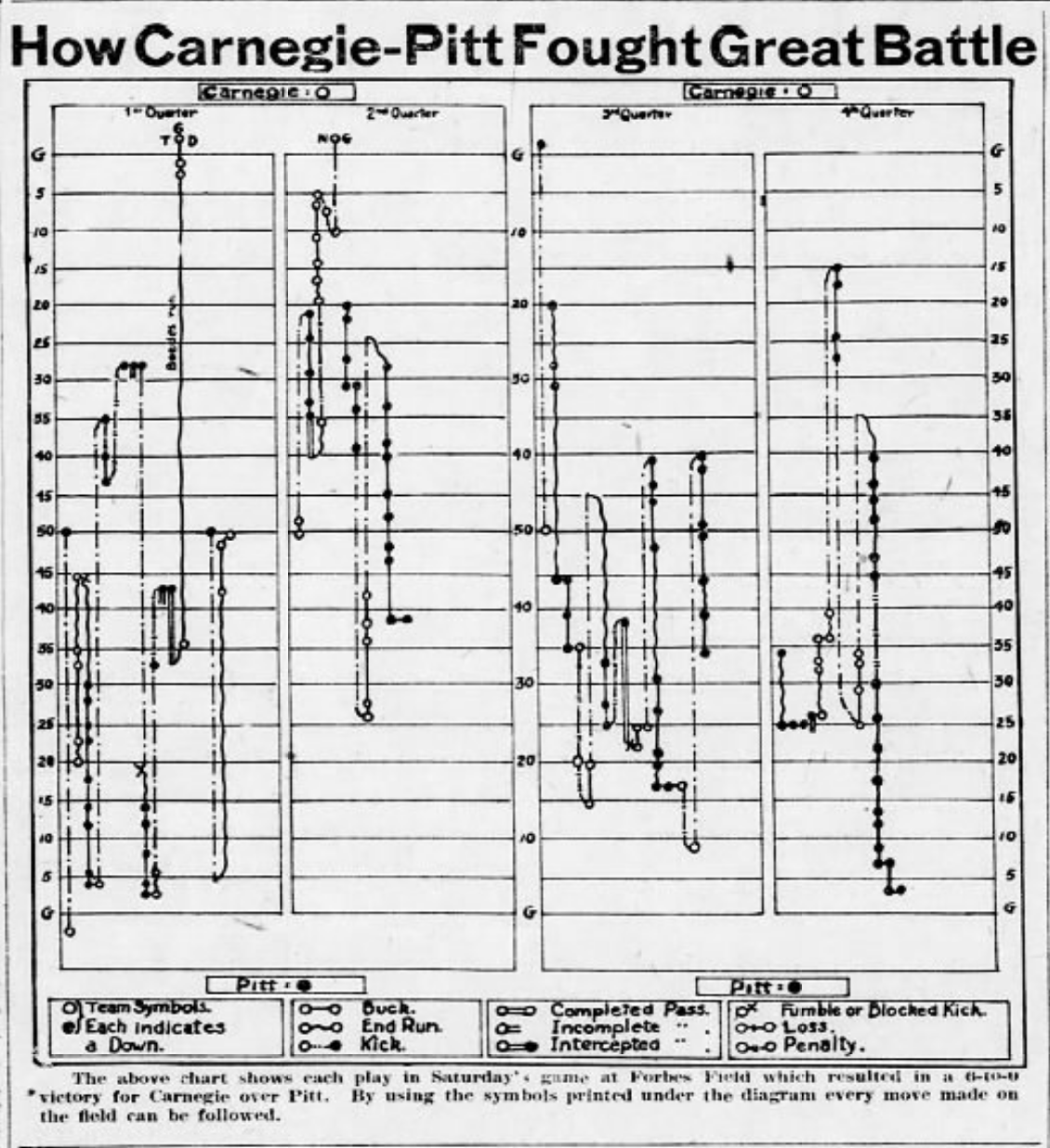
Play-By-Play Chart

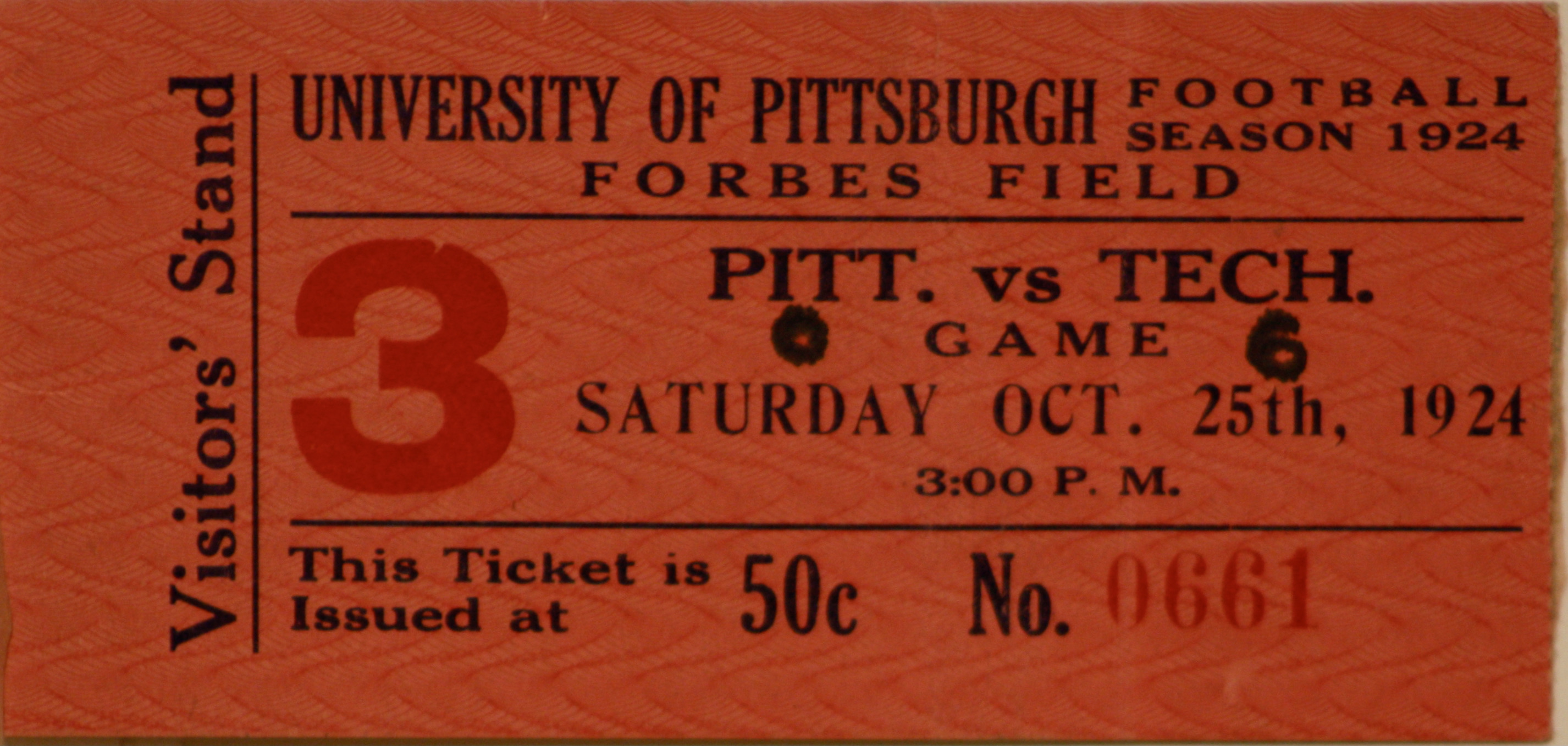
Ticket Stub

The "City Game" against Carnegie Tech generated plenty of interest after Tech earned its first win in the series last fall. The Tartans led by third-year coach Walter Steffen were 3-1 on the season, having just lost to Washington & Jefferson 10 to 0. "Coach Wally Steffen declared: 'I feel the same way about the Pitt game as I did last Saturday when we tackled Wash.- Jeff. We are up against overwhelming odds and must have a lot of luck to win'." The Tech coaches decided the team should spend Thursday and Friday in the mountains, away from the distractions of the city, for their final preparations. "The Skibos feel they can take the scalp of the Panthers again, despite the fact of the heavy odds."

Coach Sutherland was leery: "You can say it for me that I fear Carnegie. To my mind they are every bit as strong as last year, and though they do not have Jimmy Robertson, I do not propose to take them lightly...Bastian is a threat all the time and one who will have to be guarded closely...Newman is a punter of no mean ability.." No one was badly bruised in the Johns Hopkins game so Sutherland was able use the same starting lineup against the Tartans.

Harry Camins of The Gazette Times noted: "The student bands of the two well-known local institutions will be on hand to supply the music..They will certainly make a pleasing picture; Carnegie's band attired in their kilts, Pitt's in their natty gold and blue regalia...The antics of the cheerleaders are not likely to go unnoticed."

The Gazette Times reported: "As the glorious, golden October sun was making its disappearance over the western portals of the city, Carnegie Tech stood over the prostrate form of the Pitt Panther, who fell exhausted within two yards of knotting the count and possibly emerging victorious by a one-point margin, on the battle-torn gridiron at Forbes Field yesterday afternoon. The score was 6 to 0 in the Tartan's favor enabling them to retain the laurels won for the first time in history just about a 12-month ago, emblematic of their football supremacy within the confines of Pittsburgh."

In the first 10 minutes of action Pitt had the ball inside the Tech 5-yard line twice and came up empty. Later in the period Tech center Manby intercepted William Ashbaugh's forward pass on the Tech 35-yard line. "On a fake double pass (Tech fullback) Beede got loose at right tackle and ran 62 yards to the Pitt two-yard line." On second down halfback "Newman took a double pass and went over at left tackle." The extra point was unsuccessful. Tech led 6 to 0. On Tech's next possession they advanced the ball to the Pitt 5-yard line but the Panther defense stiffened and forced a field goal attempt that came up short. Halftime score: Tech 6 - Pitt 0. After intermission Pitt gained 13 first downs to Tech's one but were unable to score. Their last drive penetrated the Tech 5-yard line for a fourth time. On fourth down, "up bobbed Manby, down went (Jesse) Brown and with him Pitt's fourth, best and last chance to at least tie the score." Carnegie Tech had a 2-game win streak over the Panthers.

Carnegie Tech finished the season with a 5-4 record.

The Pitt lineup for the game against Carnegie Tech was Carl Sauer (left end), Zoner Wissiner (left tackle), Ulhardt Hangartner (left guard), Marsh Johnson (center), Noble Frank (right guard), Ralph Chase (right tackle), John Kifer (right end), William Ashbaugh (quarterback), John Harding (left halfback), Joseph Schmitt (right halfback) and Oliver Harris (fullback). Substitutes appearing in the game for Pitt were Andy Gustafson, Robert Irwin, J. W. Evans, Jesse Brown, Wendell Steele, Milo Gwosden and Floyd Snyder. The game was played in 15-minute quarters.

=== At Syracuse ===
Week 6: Pitt at Syracuse

Team	1	2	3	4	Total
Pitt	0	0	0	7	7
Syracuse	7	0	0	0	7

- Date: November 1, 1924
- Location: Archbold Stadium
  Syracuse, NY
- Game start: 2:30 p.m.
- Game attendance: 22,000
- Referee: E. J. O'Brien (Tufts)

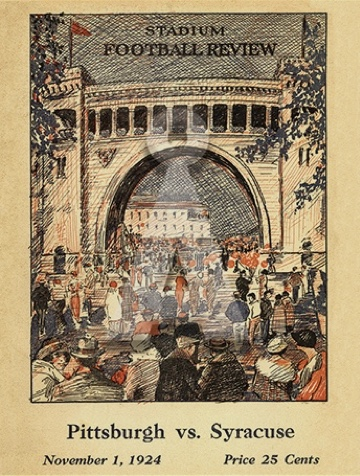
Game Day Program

The last road trip for the 1924 season was to Syracuse, NY to take on the Orange eleven at Archbold Stadium. Fifth year coach Chick Meehan's 1924 squad was undefeated at 5-0 and had only given up 13 points. The lineup was highlighted by three All-America recipients; tackles Mordecai Starobin and Pappy Waldorf, and fullback Jack McBride. The Pittsburgh Sunday Post reported: "This year Syracuse has one of the greatest teams in her history, and is considered one of the outstanding elevens in the East."

The Pitt Weekly was upbeat: "As to coach Sutherland's boys, they have recovered from the Carnegie fracas, have buried all distracting thoughts about it until next year, and are determined to give all they have to secure a victory over the Orange." Coach Sutherland will start the same eleven that faced Carnegie except for Andy Gustafson replacing Oliver Harris at fullback.

A special trainload of students, fans and the Pitt band visited Niagara Falls early Friday and then attended Halloween festivities in the evening in Buffalo. "Just before leaving Niagara, the Pitt 60-piece band gave an impromptu concert at the railroad station. It attracted most of the town and seriously hampered traffic."

Syracuse and Pittsburgh were tied at 7-7 at the Archbold Stadium. Syracuse led with a 7-0 score at the start of the fourth quarter, but the Panthers took advantage of a fumble committed by Chester Bowman. Andy Gustafson of the Pittsburgh team scored a touchdown, while Milo Gwosden was successful with his extra-point attempt.

Early in the first period Syracuse advanced the ball to the Pitt 29-yard line after a Gustafson fumble. The Pitt defense stiffened and on fourth down Jack McBride missed a 38-yard field goal. Later Pitt gained possession on their 20-yard line. On second and nine, Joe Schmitt fumbled and Syracuse guard Gus Rugg scooped up the pigskin and with plenty of interference raced into the end zone for the first touchdown. Jack McBride kicked the point after and the Orange led 7-0. At the end of the period Syracuse had the ball on the Pitt 20-yard line and McBride attempted a 30-yard field goal that hit the cross bar and fell harmlessly to the turf. A punting duel ensued for the second quarter until late, when Syracuse gained possession on the Pitt 25-yard line and McBride attempted 30-yard field goal that went wide. Halftime score: Syracuse 7, Pitt 0.

The third quarter was a defensive duel with fumbles, interceptions and punts keeping both teams out of scoring position. In the final period Joe Schmitt recovered Bowman's fumble on the Pitt 35-yard line and rambled to the Syracuse 35-yard line before he was brought down. On second down Jesse Brown raced 30-yards to the 4-yard line. Gustafson scored and Gwosden followed with the tying extra point. The Panthers earned a hard fought tie and the game ended 7 to 7. Syracuse finished the season with an 8-2-1 record.

The Pitt Weekly summed up the 1924 Panthers: "A victory coming at this time paints the Sutherlanders as an outfit that can't win a game unless it has been defeated in the one before and can't lose unless it has won the previous one."

The Pitt lineup for the game against Syracuse was Carl Sauer (left end), Zoner Wissinger (left tackle), Noble Frank (left guard), Marsh Johnson (center), Ulhardt Hangartner (right guard), Ralph Chase (right tackle), John Kifer (right end), William Ashbaugh (quarterback), John Harding (left halfback), Joseph Schmitt (right halfback) and Andy Gustafson (fullback). Substitutes appearing in the game for Pitt were Wendell Steele, Jesse Brown, Thomas Murdoch, Milo Gwosden and Howard Linn. The game was played in 15-minute quarters.

=== Geneva ===
Week 7: Geneva at Pitt

Team	1	2	3	4	Total
Geneva	0	0	0	0	0
• Pitt	0	13	0	0	13

- Date: November 8, 1922
- Location: Forbes Field
  Pittsburgh, PA
- Game start: 2:30 p.m.
- Referee: Henry J. Blum (Iron City College)

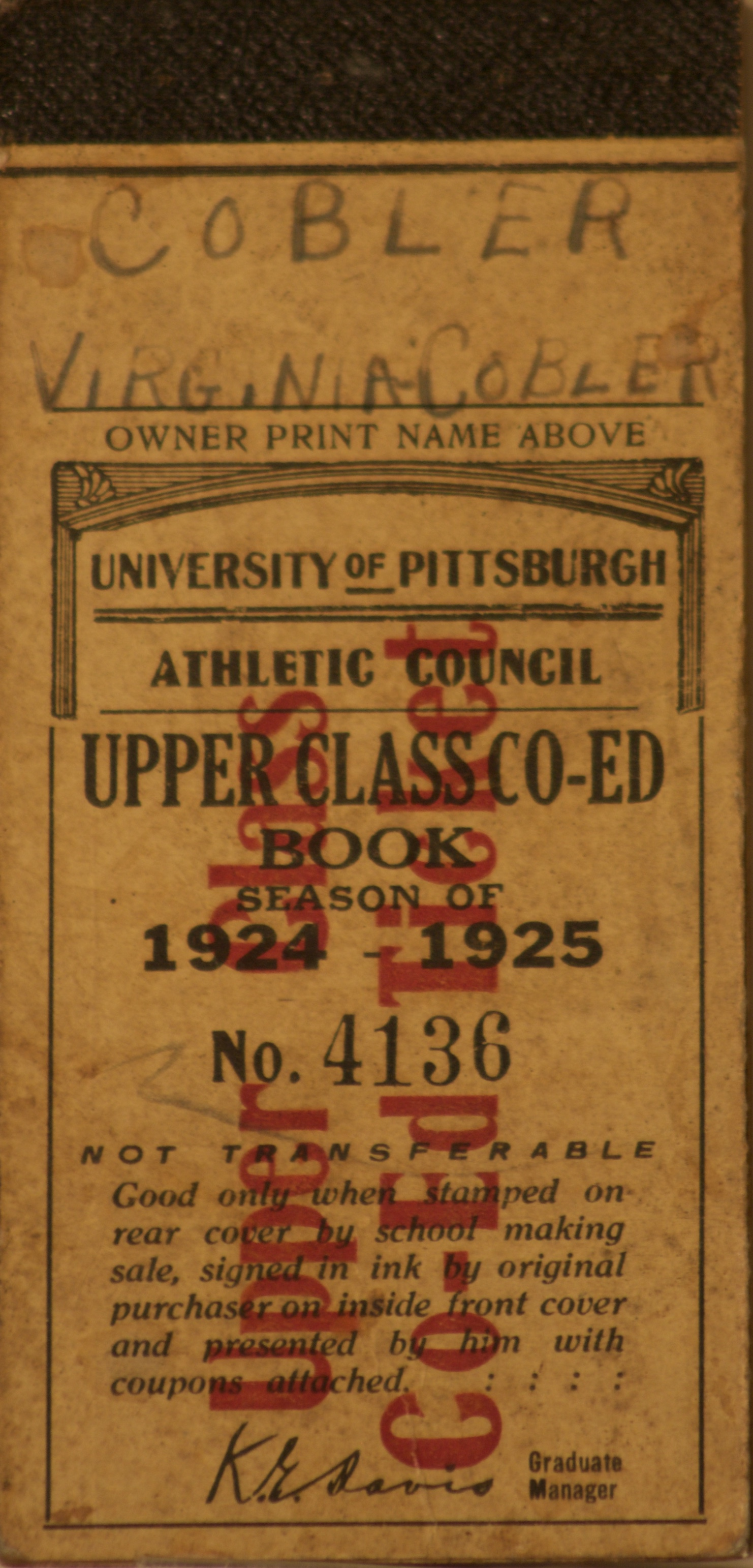
Ticket Book

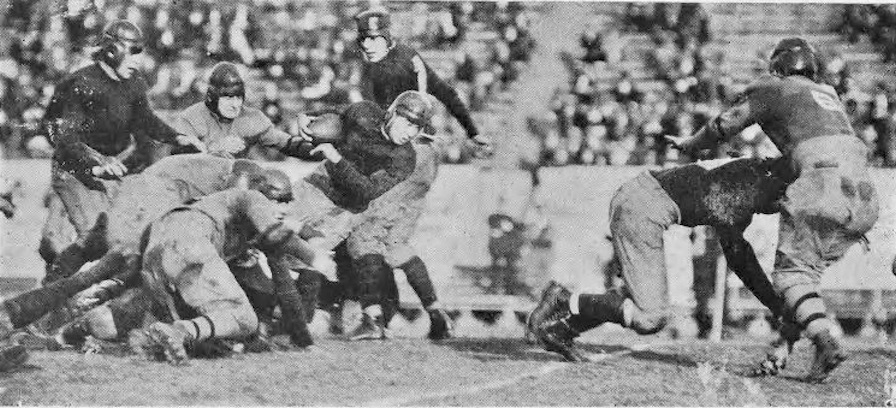
Game day action

For the third time this season coach Jock Sutherland and his Panthers will battle a team led by a former Pitt Panther and "Pop" Warner protege. The Geneva Covenanters are led by former Pitt lineman Jack Sack. The Genevans are 2-3 on the season, having beaten St. Bonaventure 14-0 the previous weekend. According to The Pittsburgh Press: "Coach Jack Sack has been working overtime with his charges, and has them in fine fettle physically and has keyed them up to a real fighting pitch. They have been given some special plays for use today, and are prepared to play their heads off to win."

The Pitt Athletic Department sent invitations to all area high school coaches to bring their teams to the game and also extended invitations to the Home for Crippled Children and Boys' Clubs in the Pittsburgh area. "There will be a lot of youthful enthusiasts on hand many of them possibly seeing their first college game."

On Saturday morning Coach Sutherland mentioned to The Pittsburgh Press that he would start his first team, but at game time he had a change of strategy. Marsh Johnson at center and Carl Sauer at left end were the only first teamers on the field for the kick-off.

The Philadelphia Inquirer headline summed up the game: "Pitt's Scrubs Outplay Geneva and Win, 13-0." Ollie Harris scored both touchdowns in the second quarter. Milo Gwosden was good on the second extra point to account for the 13 points. Pitt had a scoring opportunity in the first period after a sustained drive from midfield but halfback J. W. Evans fumbled into the end zone. Coach Sutherland substituted freely and experimented with various lineups. Geneva finished the season with a 3-4-2 record.

Ralph S. Davis of The Pittsburgh Press was not happy with the Panther coaching staff:

"After the Pitt management had announced in advance of last Saturday's game that the entire first team would be started against Geneva, Sauer and Johnson were the only men who might be regarded as regulars who were in the lineup. The reason assigned for such a lineup as Pitt presented probably is that the regulars were being saved for W. & J. This explanation is hardly satisfying to those who paid their money to see the Panthers in action. Moreover, the policy of a coach in keeping his men out of one game to prepare them for another to follow admits of question as to its sanity. The best way to condition a football team is to keep it working. Certainly it cannot be said that the Pitt team has nothing to learn. And it would have been no harder on the regulars to have them play against Geneva than it will be to have them scrimmage against other members of the Pitt squad this week."

The Pitt lineup for the game against Geneva was Carl Sauer (left end), Harold Akins (left tackle), Howard Linn (left guard), Marsh Johnson (center), Wendell Steele (right guard), Thomas Murdoch (right tackle), Milo Gwosden (right end), Jesse Brown (quarterback), J. W. Evans (left halfback), Carl McCutcheon (right halfback) and Oliver Harris (fullback). Substitutes appearing in the game for Pitt were Floyd Snyder, William Ashbaugh, Clyde Jack, Henry Schmitt, Frank Benedict, Herman Riester, Joseph Archibald and Michael Meyer. The game was played in 15-minute quarters.

=== Washington & Jefferson ===
Week 8: Washington & Jefferson at Pitt

Team	1	2	3	4	Total
• W. & J.	0	0	3	7	10
Pitt	0	0	0	0	0

- Date: November 15, 1924
- Location: Forbes Field
  Pittsburgh, PA
- Game start: 2:30 p.m.
- Game attendance: 35,000
- Referee: E. J. O'Brien (Tufts)

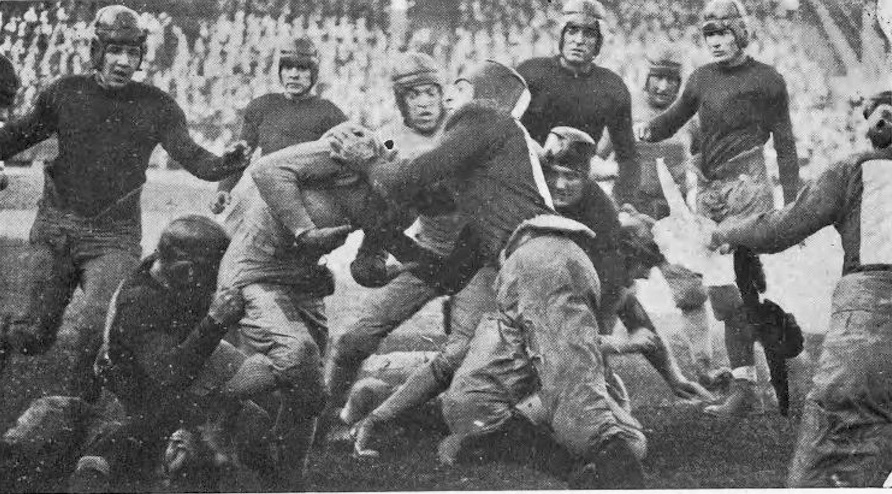
Dee-Fense!!!

The next contest on the schedule was against the W. & J. Presidents. This was the twenty-fifth meeting and the series was tied at 12-12. "Pitt may have its Lafayette games, its Penn games, its West Virginia and Carnegie games – and they are all important and interesting – but for sheer, unalloyed enthusiasm, the annual Pitt W. & J. tangles takes the cake and the cream coating." Coach David C. Morrow has his team at 6-1 on the season with their only loss to Pitt nemesis Lafayette. There is no evidence of overconfidence as they try to put a stop to Pitt's two game win streak in the series, as coach Morrow stressed: "I have never seen a Pitt team that was weak when we encountered it." The Presidents will be without "Francis Niehaus, the hardest-hitting back in either stable, and Cad Reese, the Red and Black's most skillful field director."

Coach Sutherland replaced William Ashbaugh at quarterback with Jesse Brown in the starting lineup. He made no predictions on the outcome but felt his team would play their best and not fail him.

"Washington & Jefferson College did what was expected and defeated the University of Pittsburgh 10 to 0, at Forbes Field this afternoon." A 25-yard field goal by the Presidents' end "Tus" Edwards late in the third period broke the scoreless tie. On their next possession, the Presidents again moved into scoring territory and Edwards attempted another 25-yard field goal. The kick was low and Pitt gained possession on their 20-yard line. On first down John Harding fumbled on a double pass and Ray Ride, substitute W. & J. lineman, scooped up the pigskin on the ten yard line and lumbered into the end zone unmolested. Edwards converted the point after and the Washington & Jefferson fans celebrated.

Pitt's statistics show they came to play as they earned 13 first downs to the Presidents 8. The Panthers completed 11 of 23 passes for 125 yards and gained 138 yards by rushing. Their Achillies heal was fumbles and penalties at inopportune times during the game. Ralph Davis of The Pittsburgh Press pondered: "It is extremely hard to understand why Pitt fumbles so much. She has been guilty of it all season, and certainly the coaches should take extreme measures to overcome the tendency. W. & J. deserved to win, because she proved herself to be a team of opportunists. Pitt deserved to lose, because she provided the opportunities of which the Red and Black took advantage."

The Pitt lineup for the game against Washington and Jefferson was Blair McMillin (left end), Zoner Wissinger (left tackle), Ulhardt Hangartner (left guard), Marsh Johnson (center), Noble Frank (right guard), Ralph Chase (right tackle), John Kifer (right end), Jesse Brown (quarterback), Joseph Schmitt (left halfback), John Harding (right halfback) and Andy Gustafson (fullback). Substitutes appearing in the game for Pitt were Carl Sauer, Harold Akins, Wendell Steele, Milo Gwosden, William Ashbaugh, Carl McCutcheon and Oliver Harris.

=== Penn State ===
Week 9: Penn State at Pitt

Team	1	2	3	4	Total
Penn State	3	0	0	0	3
• Pitt	0	6	12	6	24

- Date: November 27, 1924
- Location: Forbes Field
  Pittsburgh, PA
- Game start: 2:00 p.m.
- Game attendance: 33,000
- Referee: W. G. Crowell (Swarthmore)

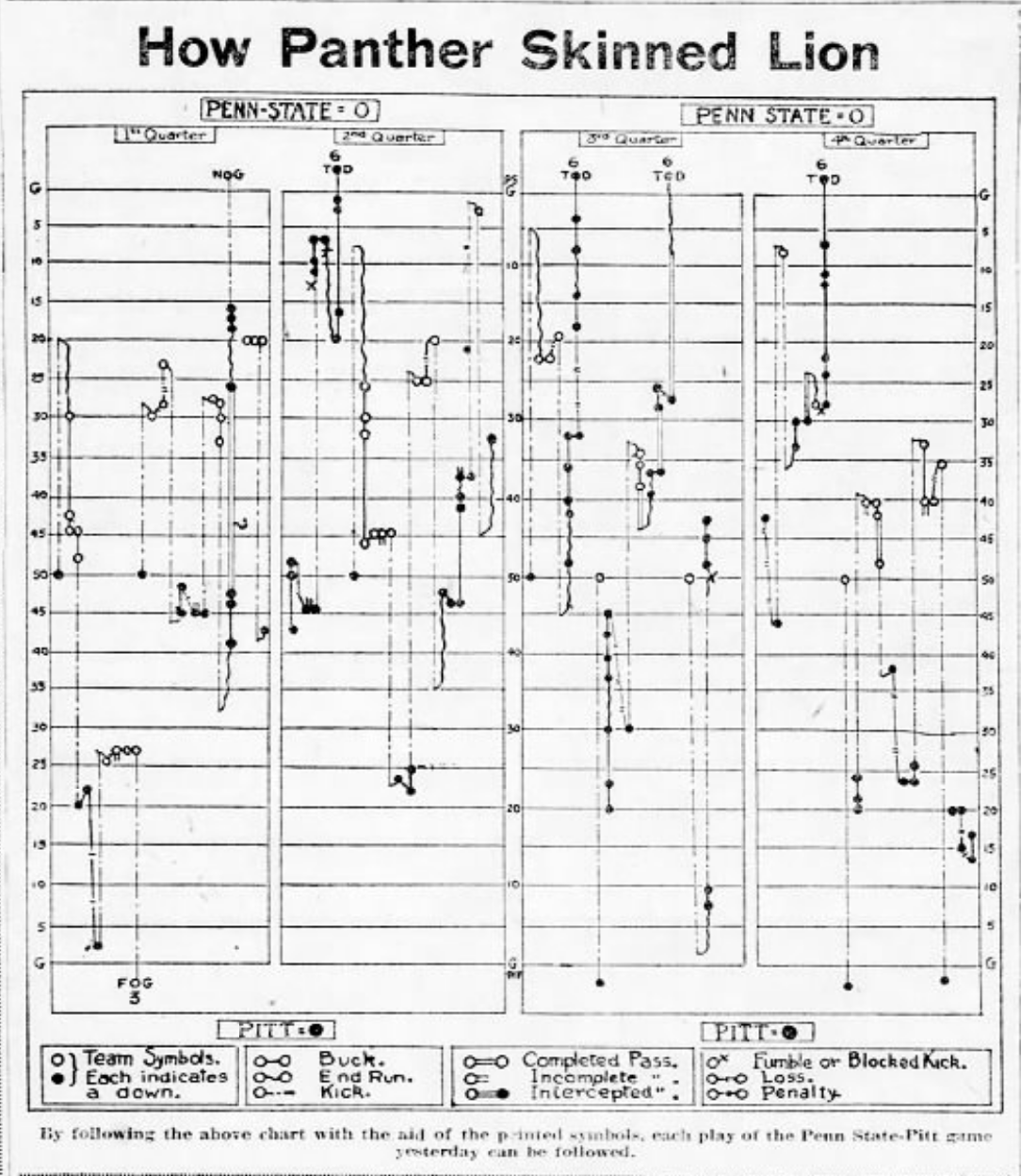
Play-By-Play Chart

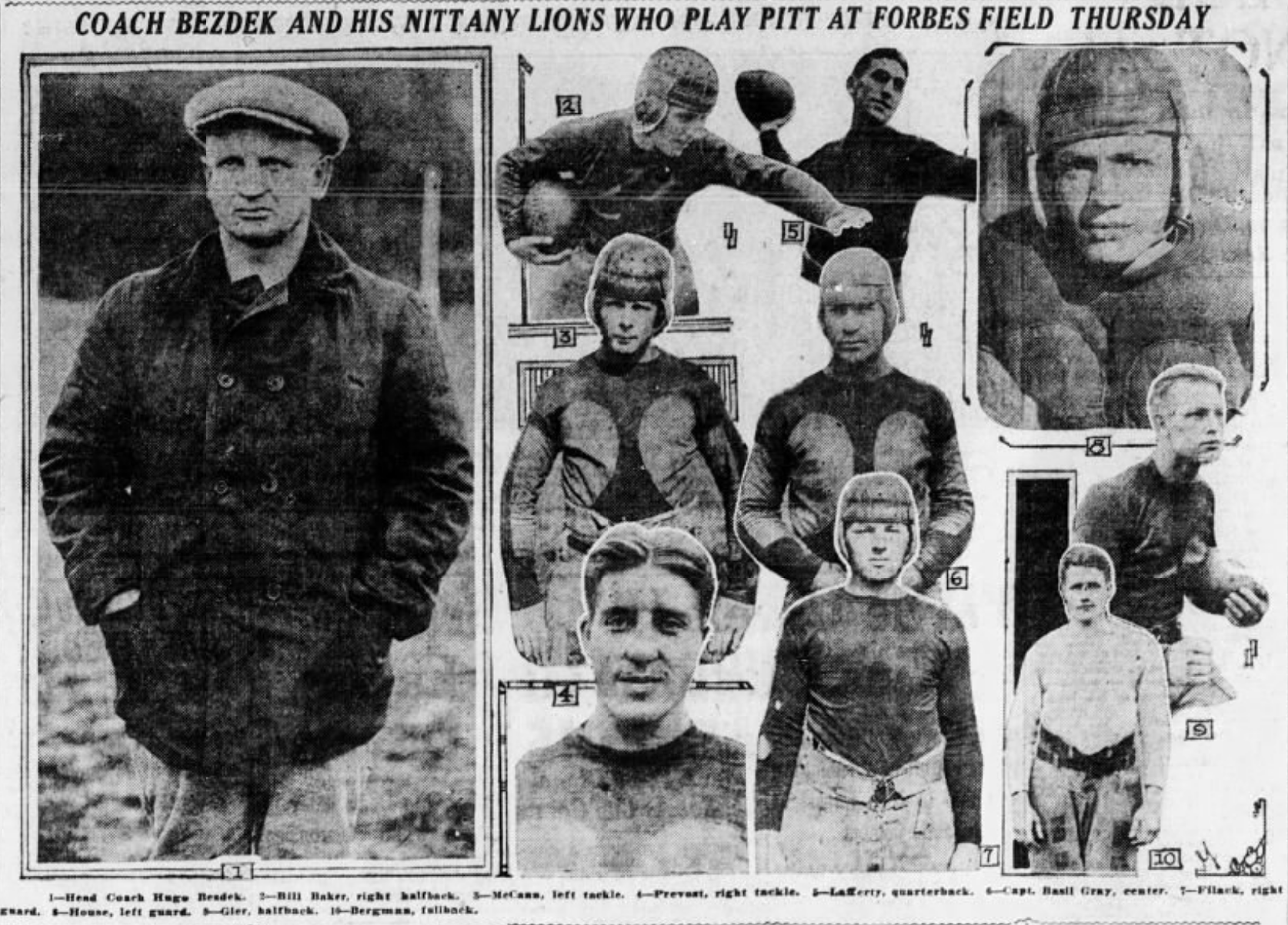
Penn State coach and players

The Pitt Weekly noted: "Pitt will bring down the curtain on the 1924 football season tomorrow, our friendly rivals from Penn State being the attraction...Statistics show that Pitt and State have both won 12 games and have tied two of the 26 contests....The big feature of tomorrow's contest is that it is the last to be played at Forbes Field." "It is a real relief to the athletic authorities to bid farewell to Forbes Field, especially in view of the fact that the football ticket situation there has become intolerable...With the stadium available in 1925, and almost every seat in it affording a good view of the game, the ticket problems will be solved for some years to come."

Hugo Bezdek has the State eleven at 6-2-1 on the season. His team's strength is the line led by two All-Americans - tackle Jules Prevost and guard William House. It has been 5 years since Penn State beat Pitt. Chester Smith of The Gazette Times wrote: "State's opportunity this fall is golden." "On the dope, the Lions should win by a narrow margin. They appear to be steadier than the Panthers with a trifle better offense."

"As for coach Sutherland's charges, they have lost no time since the W. & J. game, and for over a week have been practicing with one thought uppermost in their minds – 'Beat Penn State.' Spirited away at the end of last week to the quiet of Mountain View Hotel near Ligonier, the entire squad has been polished and primed by 'Jock' for the supreme test. The Panthers know they face the stiffest foe of the entire season, and have their backs to the wall, prepared to fight to the last." Ralph Davis of The Pittsburgh Press reiterated his concern about the Pitt miscues: "If he (Coach Sutherland) has insisted on his men doing no foul holding in the line; if he has improved their tackling and if he has taught them to hold a football without fumbling, then the Panthers have a good chance to upset the dope...A team which is not up on fundamentals can hardly expect to triumph against an outfit of Penn State's caliber."

"Pittsburgh today treated 33,000 football fans to the surprise of their lives by giving Penn State one of the worst lickings in the history of the contests between the two institutions. The score was 24 to 3, and many who saw the complete rout of Hugo Bezdek's charges agree that the score hardly tells the story of how completely outclassed the Centre countians were."

Penn State scored early in the first period as All-American tackle Jules Prevost booted a 36-yard field goal. State would not come close to scoring again. Milo Gwosden missed a field goal in the first period. Early in the second quarter he had his second attempt blocked by State guard Michalske, but Gwosden recovered it and Pitt kept possession on the State 20-yard line. Four plays later, Andy Gustafson plunged into the end zone for the go-ahead score. Gwosden flubbed the extra point. Halftime score: Pitt 6, State 3. "Quarterback Jesse Brown gave Pitt a 12–3 lead in the third quarter on a touchdown run, then Gwosden, subbing for end John Kifer, tried to make up for his other miscues with a TD run that made it 18-3. Naturally, Gwosden blew his own extra point. Halfback Carl McCutcheon accounted for Pitt's final score in the last quarter."

Pitt dominated. Pitt earned 11 first downs to State's 3; Pitt completed 5 of 9 passes for 91 yards; State completed 1 of 5 passes; Pitt gained 315 total yards to 119 for State. Ralph S. Davis of The Press praised: "There have been some startling metamorphoses on the gridiron this fall, but none more sensational than that noticeable in the Pitt team yesterday."

The Pitt lineup for the game against Penn State was Blair McMillin (left end), Zoner Wissinger (left tackle), Ulhardt Hangartner (left guard), Marsh Johnson (center), Noble Frank (right guard), Ralph Chase (right tackle), John Kifer (right end), Jesse Brown (quarterback), Carl McCutcheon (left halfback), John Harding (right halfback) and Andy Gustafson (fullback). Substitutes appearing in the game for Pitt were Howard Linn, Milo Gwosden, Carl sauer, Oliver Harris, Thomas Murdoch, Harold Akins, Robert Irwin, Wendell Steele and William Ashbaugh. The game was played in 15-minute quarters.

== Scoring summary ==
1924 Pittsburgh Panthers scoring summary
Player	Touchdowns	Extra points	Field goals	Safety	Points
Andy Gustafson	4	0	0	0	24
Joseph Schmitt	3	0	0	0	18
Oliver Harris	3	0	0	0	18
Milo Gwosden	1	7	0	0	13
Carl McCutcheon	2	0	0	0	12
John Harding	1	0	0	0	6
Jesse Brown	1	0	0	0	6
William Ashbaugh	0	1	0	0	1
Totals	15	8	0	0	98

== Postseason ==
"Now that (the season) is all over, Coach Sutherland deserves something better than honorable mention. He deserves a hearty hand clasp and praise from every loyal son of Pitt. Very few know the handicaps under which this taciturn Scot worked all season. His team was licked by Lafayette, Wash-Jeff and Carnegie Tech, and yet he took his medicine like a man, stuck to his task and worked wonders with a team that had been crushed by Wash-Jeff two weeks ago, brought order out of chaos and placed eleven fighting men on the gridiron for State. The team played real football. Those who predicted that the bottom would drop out of football at Pitt after Pop Warner had left, now have an opportunity to revamp their opinions. Good work, Jock."

The following players received their letters for the 1924 season at the annual football banquet– Captain Noble Lee Frank, Harold Akins, Alfred Amann, William Ashbaugh, Jesse Brown, Ralph Chase, Andy Gustafson, Milo Gwosden, Ulhard Hangartner, John Harding, Oliver Harris, Robert Irwin, Marsh Johnson, John Kifer, Howard Linn, Carl McCutcheon, Blair McMillan, Thomas Murdoch, Carl Sauer, Joseph Schmitt, Wendell Stele, Zoner Wissinger and Manager Harry Reed. The lettermen elected tackle Ralph Chase as Captain for the 1925 season.

Seven lettermen have their last game for Pitt and were scheduled to graduate in June. They were Akins, Ashbaugh, Frank, Gwosden, Johnson, Sauer and Murdoch.

Axel J. Anderson was selected as football student manager for the 1925 season by Karl E. Davis and the Athletic Council. Axel, who is from Jamestown, NY and prepped at Bellefonte Academy, is a junior in the School of Business Administration.

Floyd Rose, Col. '96, longtime assistant coach and member of all the Athletic Committees associated with Pitt athletics announced his resignation effective January 1, 1925. "Floyd was a fellow who was available and who could be depended upon 12 months a year and 25 hours a day." He resigned from the Pitt Football Committee, the Stadium Committee, the Alumni Council, the Athletic Council and his position as assistant varsity coach. Thanks to him the stadium became a reality.

Graduating center, Marsh Johnson, was hired as assistant coach to replace Floyd Rose on Coach Sutherland's staff.

=== All-American selections ===
Zoner "Zeke" Wissinger – halfback (third team Walter Camp)
