= Jesse Brown (American football) =

American football player (1903–1983)

No. 10
- Positions: Halfback, fullback

Personal information
- Born: November 3, 1902; Bangor, Iowa
- Died: March 16, 1983 (aged 80); Honesdale, Pennsylvania
- Listed height: 5 ft 10 in (1.78 m)
- Listed weight: 180 lb (82 kg)

Career information
- High school: Nichols (Buffalo, New York)
- College: Pittsburgh

Career history
- Pottsville Maroons (1926)
- Stats at Pro Football Reference

Jesse John Brown (November 3, 1902 – March 16, 1983) was an American football player who played professionally for the Pottsville Maroons of the early National Football League (NFL). After attending and playing for the University of Pittsburgh, he played in 13 games for the Maroons during the 1926 season.

Brown was born in Bangor, Iowa. He died on March 16, 1983, at Ellen Memorial Health Care Center in Honesdale, Pennsylvania.
